= Harry Jürgensen Rundshagen =

Chilean politician

Harry Jürgensen
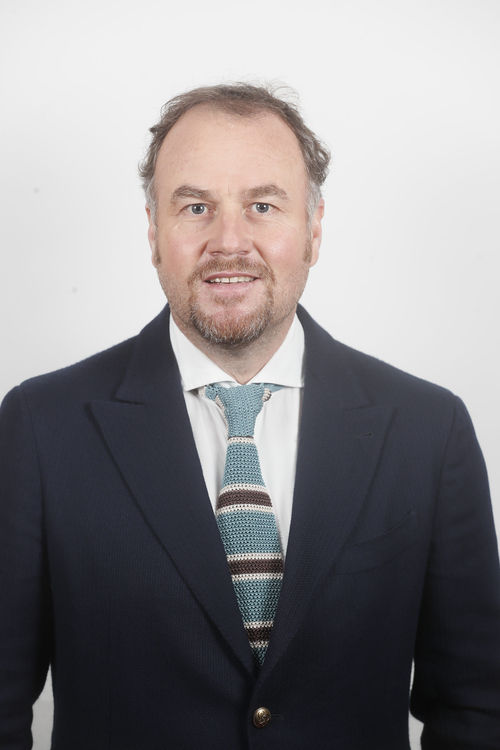
- Official portrait, 2022

Ambassador of Chile to Austria
- Incumbent
- Assumed office 17 June 2026
- President: José Antonio Kast
- Preceded by: Alex Wetzig

Member of the Chamber of Deputies of Chile
- In office 11 March 2018 – 11 March 2026
- Constituency: District 25

Regional Counseller
- In office 11 March 2014 – 18 November 2016
- Constituency: Los Lagos Region

Personal details
- Born: 3 September 1968 (age 58) Santiago, Chile
- Party: Republican (since 2025)
- Other political affiliations: National Renewal (–2020)
- Children: One
- Parent(s): Harry Jürgensen; Wiltrudis Rundshagen
- Education: Austral University of Chile
- Occupation: Politician
- Profession: Veterinary

Harry Kurt Thomas Jürgensen Rundshagen (born 3 September 1968) is a Chilean politician who serves as ambassador of Chile to Austria since June 2026.

Previously, he served as deputy from 2018 to 2026.

== Family and early life ==
He was born in Osorno on 3 September 1968, the son of Harry Jurgensen Caesar, a former National Renewal deputy for the former 56th electoral district of the Los Lagos Region (1994–1998) and former Intendant of the Los Lagos Region during the administration of President Sebastián Piñera, and Wiltrudis Millarey Rundshagen Kruschinski.

He is divorced and the father of one son.

== Professional life ==
He completed his primary and secondary education at the German Institute of Osorno.

Between 1988 and 1992, he studied veterinary medicine at the Austral University of Chile.

In his professional career, he has worked as an agro-industrial executive. Between 1997 and 2018, he served as general administrator of Agrícola Río Chifín Ltda. in the commune of Río Negro, in the Los Lagos Region.

== Political career ==
He began his political career as a candidate for the Chamber of Deputies of Chile in the 2005 parliamentary elections, representing National Renewal in the former 56th electoral district of the Los Lagos Region. He obtained 11,528 votes, equivalent to 15.75% of the valid votes cast, and was not elected.

In the 2009 parliamentary elections, he again ran for a seat in the Chamber of Deputies, this time in the former 55th electoral district of the Los Lagos Region. He received 15,888 votes, corresponding to 20.48% of the valid votes cast, and was again unsuccessful.

In November 2013, he was elected regional councillor for Osorno Province, representing National Renewal. He obtained 11,530 votes, equivalent to 12.69% of the valid votes cast.

On 14 November 2016, he resigned from his position as regional councillor in order to run for the Chamber of Deputies.

In the 2017 parliamentary elections, he was elected to the Chamber of Deputies on the Chile Vamos list, representing National Renewal in the 25th electoral district of the Los Lagos Region, comprising the communes of Fresia, Frutillar, Llanquihue, Los Muermos, Osorno, Puerto Octay, Puerto Varas, Puyehue, Purranque, Río Negro, San Juan de la Costa and San Pablo. He obtained 20,531 votes, corresponding to 15.79% of the valid votes cast.

On 20 November 2020, he resigned from National Renewal.

In August 2021, he ran for re-election in the same district. In the parliamentary elections held in November, he was elected as an independent candidate affiliated with the Republican Party of Chile within the Frente Social Cristiano coalition, obtaining 22,618 votes, equivalent to 16.42% of the valid votes cast. This was the highest vote share for his political sector in the Los Lagos Region.

On 11 June 2025, he formally joined the Republican Party of Chile. On 17 June 2026, President José Antonio Kast appointed Becker as ambassador of Chile to Austria.
