= District 25 (Chamber of Deputies of Chile) =

Electoral district of the Chamber of Deputies of Chile

- Distrito 25
- Electoral District for the Chamber of Deputies
- Location of District 25 within Chile
- Commune: List: Fresia; Frutillar; Llanquihue; Los Muermos; Osorno; Puerto Octay; Puerto Varas; Purranque; Puyehue; Río Negro; San Juan de la Costa; San Pablo
- Region: Los Lagos
- Population: 344,048 (2017)
- Electorate: 321,533 (2021)
- Area: 17,048 km^{2} (2020)

Current Electoral District
- Created: 2017
- Seats: 4 (2017–present)
- Deputies: List: Héctor Barría (PDC); Harry Jürgensen (Ind); Daniel Lilayu (UDI); Emilia Nuyado (PS)

District 25 (Spanish: Distrito 25) is one of the 28 multi-member electoral districts of the Chamber of Deputies, the lower house of the National Congress, the national legislature of Chile. The district was created by the 2015 electoral reform and came into being at the following general election in 2017. It consists of the communes of Fresia, Frutillar, Llanquihue, Los Muermos, Osorno, Puerto Octay, Puerto Varas, Purranque, Puyehue, Río Negro, San Juan de la Costa and San Pablo in the region of Los Lagos. The district currently elects four of the 155 members of the Chamber of Deputies using the open party-list proportional representation electoral system. At the 2021 general election the district had 321,533 registered electors.

== Electoral system ==
District 25 currently elects four of the 155 members of the Chamber of Deputies using the open party-list proportional representation electoral system. Parties may form electoral pacts with each other to pool their votes and increase their chances of winning seats. However, the number of candidates nominated by an electoral pact may not exceed the maximum number of candidates that a single party may nominate. Seats are allocated using the D'Hondt method.

== Election results ==
=== Summary ===
| Election | Apruebo Dignidad AD / FA | | | Green Ecologists PEV | | | New Social Pact NPS / NM | | | Democratic Convergence CD | | | Chile Vamos Podemos / Vamos | | | Party of the People PDG | | | Christian Social Front FSC | | |
| Election | Votes | % | Seats | Votes | % | Seats | Votes | % | Seats | Votes | % | Seats | Votes | % | Seats | Votes | % | Seats | Votes | % | Seats |
|---|---|---|---|---|---|---|---|---|---|---|---|---|---|---|---|---|---|---|---|---|---|
| 2021 | 15,769 | 11.45% | 0 | 6,270 | 4.55% | 0 | 44,630 | 32.41% | 2 | | | | 29,429 | 21.37% | 1 | 10,444 | 7.58% | 0 | 28,572 | 20.75% | 1 |
| 2017 | 6,145 | 4.72% | 0 | | | | 44,586 | 34.28% | 2 | 19,700 | 15.15% | 0 | 46,270 | 35.57% | 2 | | | | | | |

=== Detailed ===
==== 2021 ====
Results of the 2021 general election held on 21 November 2021:

| Party | | Pact | Party | | | | | | | | | | | | | | | Pact | | |
| Party | | Pact | Votes per commune | | | | | | | | | | | | Total votes | % | Seats | Votes | % | Seats |
| Party | | Pact | Fresia | Fru- tillar | Llan- quihue | Los Muer- mos | Osorno | Puerto Octay | Puerto Varas | Purran- que | Puye- hue | Río Negro | San Juan de la Costa | San Pablo | Total votes | % | Seats | Votes | % | Seats |
|---|---|---|---|---|---|---|---|---|---|---|---|---|---|---|---|---|---|---|---|---|
| Socialist Party of Chile | PS | New Social Pact | 764 | 886 | 511 | 500 | 11,246 | 502 | 1,342 | 612 | 814 | 1,646 | 1,904 | 1,752 | 22,479 | 16.32% | 1 | 44,630 | 32.41% | 2 |
| Christian Democratic Party | PDC | New Social Pact | 535 | 1,037 | 821 | 309 | 9,708 | 855 | 1,122 | 3,818 | 524 | 1,352 | 358 | 442 | 20,881 | 15.16% | 1 | 44,630 | 32.41% | 2 |
| Radical Party of Chile | PR | New Social Pact | 33 | 70 | 58 | 88 | 521 | 55 | 253 | 64 | 38 | 31 | 22 | 37 | 1,270 | 0.92% | 0 | 44,630 | 32.41% | 2 |
| Independent Democratic Union | UDI | Chile Podemos + | 228 | 636 | 312 | 812 | 8,944 | 466 | 2,843 | 804 | 634 | 572 | 303 | 455 | 17,009 | 12.35% | 1 | 29,429 | 21.37% | 1 |
| National Renewal | RN | Chile Podemos + | 655 | 807 | 2,443 | 706 | 2,876 | 160 | 3,465 | 271 | 278 | 343 | 141 | 275 | 12,420 | 9.02% | 0 | 29,429 | 21.37% | 1 |
| Republican Party | REP | Christian Social Front | 1,091 | 1,994 | 1,121 | 1,466 | 11,905 | 663 | 5,672 | 1,561 | 1,023 | 1,005 | 354 | 717 | 28,572 | 20.75% | 1 | 28,572 | 20.75% | 1 |
| Democratic Revolution | RD | Apruebo Dignidad | 631 | 499 | 639 | 302 | 4,162 | 201 | 2,286 | 302 | 183 | 160 | 142 | 146 | 9,653 | 7.01% | 0 | 15,769 | 11.45% | 0 |
| Communist Party of Chile | PC | Apruebo Dignidad | 77 | 265 | 184 | 120 | 1,879 | 173 | 620 | 94 | 109 | 64 | 51 | 48 | 3,684 | 2.68% | 0 | 15,769 | 11.45% | 0 |
| Social Convergence | CS | Apruebo Dignidad | 24 | 106 | 84 | 58 | 1,403 | 28 | 418 | 48 | 159 | 48 | 30 | 26 | 2,432 | 1.77% | 0 | 15,769 | 11.45% | 0 |
| Party of the People | PDG | | 242 | 570 | 524 | 449 | 5,360 | 320 | 1,468 | 391 | 313 | 328 | 209 | 270 | 10,444 | 7.58% | 0 | 10,444 | 7.58% | 0 |
| Green Ecologist Party | PEV | | 105 | 332 | 262 | 216 | 3,231 | 109 | 1,333 | 158 | 166 | 118 | 110 | 130 | 6,270 | 4.55% | 0 | 6,270 | 4.55% | 0 |
| United Centre | CU | United Independents | 32 | 105 | 72 | 60 | 694 | 36 | 285 | 64 | 49 | 43 | 21 | 50 | 1,511 | 1.10% | 0 | 2,600 | 1.89% | 0 |
| National Citizen Party | PNC | United Independents | 21 | 53 | 34 | 58 | 481 | 29 | 209 | 47 | 48 | 32 | 30 | 47 | 1,089 | 0.79% | 0 | 2,600 | 1.89% | 0 |
| Valid votes | | | 4,438 | 7,360 | 7,065 | 5,144 | 62,410 | 3,597 | 21,316 | 8,234 | 4,338 | 5,742 | 3,675 | 4,395 | 137,714 | 100.00% | 4 | 137,714 | 100.00% | 4 |
| Blank votes | | | 725 | 768 | 579 | 1,297 | 3,005 | 366 | 1,231 | 562 | 559 | 361 | 221 | 311 | 9,985 | 6.50% | | | | |
| Rejected votes – other | | | 228 | 348 | 323 | 403 | 2,671 | 155 | 727 | 330 | 197 | 237 | 143 | 170 | 5,932 | 3.86% | | | | |
| Total polled | | | 5,391 | 8,476 | 7,967 | 6,844 | 68,086 | 4,118 | 23,274 | 9,126 | 5,094 | 6,340 | 4,039 | 4,876 | 153,631 | 47.78% | | | | |
| Registered electors | | | 12,172 | 17,227 | 16,207 | 16,423 | 143,216 | 9,074 | 43,875 | 19,788 | 11,691 | 13,459 | 8,249 | 10,152 | 321,533 | | | | | |
| Turnout | | | 44.29% | 49.20% | 49.16% | 41.67% | 47.54% | 45.38% | 53.05% | 46.12% | 43.57% | 47.11% | 48.96% | 48.03% | 47.78% | | | | | |

The following candidates were elected: Héctor Barría (PDC), 13,021 votes; Harry Jürgensen (REP), 22,618 votes; Daniel Lilayu (UDI), 9,004 votes; and Emilia Nuyado (PS), 15,981 votes.

==== 2017 ====
Results of the 2017 general election held on 19 November 2017:

| Party | | Pact | Party | | | | | | | | | | | | | | | Pact | | |
| Party | | Pact | Votes per commune | | | | | | | | | | | | Total votes | % | Seats | Votes | % | Seats |
| Party | | Pact | Fresia | Fru- tillar | Llan- quihue | Los Muer- mos | Osorno | Puerto Octay | Puerto Varas | Purran- que | Puye- hue | Río Negro | San Juan de la Costa | San Pablo | Total votes | % | Seats | Votes | % | Seats |
|---|---|---|---|---|---|---|---|---|---|---|---|---|---|---|---|---|---|---|---|---|
| National Renewal | RN | Chile Vamos | 1,190 | 1,437 | 1,122 | 1,196 | 9,960 | 511 | 4,848 | 1,810 | 558 | 1,565 | 247 | 390 | 24,834 | 19.09% | 1 | 46,270 | 35.57% | 2 |
| Independent Democratic Union | UDI | Chile Vamos | 436 | 864 | 453 | 902 | 10,523 | 446 | 2,278 | 845 | 844 | 602 | 525 | 897 | 19,615 | 15.08% | 1 | 46,270 | 35.57% | 2 |
| Evópoli | EVO | Chile Vamos | 30 | 68 | 57 | 42 | 668 | 20 | 770 | 64 | 41 | 29 | 12 | 20 | 1,821 | 1.40% | 0 | 46,270 | 35.57% | 2 |
| Socialist Party of Chile | PS | Nueva Mayoría | 2,798 | 3,039 | 3,377 | 2,318 | 7,903 | 1,438 | 4,904 | 2,798 | 1,949 | 2,139 | 1,679 | 1,806 | 36,148 | 27.79% | 2 | 44,586 | 34.28% | 2 |
| Party for Democracy | PPD | Nueva Mayoría | 20 | 37 | 134 | 49 | 4,297 | 180 | 122 | 108 | 112 | 116 | 99 | 153 | 5,427 | 4.17% | 0 | 44,586 | 34.28% | 2 |
| Communist Party of Chile | PC | Nueva Mayoría | 77 | 126 | 155 | 144 | 1,577 | 85 | 306 | 175 | 112 | 137 | 48 | 69 | 3,011 | 2.32% | 0 | 44,586 | 34.28% | 2 |
| Christian Democratic Party | PDC | Democratic Convergence | 170 | 278 | 485 | 240 | 13,719 | 437 | 753 | 1,113 | 720 | 563 | 516 | 706 | 19,700 | 15.15% | 0 | 19,700 | 15.15% | 0 |
| Citizen Power | PODER | Broad Front | 113 | 427 | 323 | 271 | 2,867 | 117 | 1,315 | 271 | 132 | 132 | 78 | 99 | 6,145 | 4.72% | 0 | 6,145 | 4.72% | 0 |
| Citizens | CIU | Sumemos | 53 | 51 | 59 | 50 | 3,701 | 41 | 130 | 87 | 60 | 72 | 99 | 65 | 4,468 | 3.44% | 0 | 5,253 | 4.04% | 0 |
| Todos | TODOS | Sumemos | 19 | 35 | 32 | 46 | 396 | 23 | 98 | 45 | 29 | 27 | 13 | 22 | 785 | 0.60% | 0 | 5,253 | 4.04% | 0 |
| Patagonian Regional Democracy | DRP | Green Regionalist Coalition | 92 | 171 | 143 | 151 | 1,233 | 101 | 321 | 201 | 173 | 134 | 69 | 83 | 2,872 | 2.21% | 0 | 2,872 | 2.21% | 0 |
| Progressive Party | PRO | All Over Chile | 95 | 125 | 161 | 194 | 1,060 | 111 | 337 | 227 | 97 | 120 | 71 | 68 | 2,666 | 2.05% | 0 | 2,666 | 2.05% | 0 |
| Luis Abarca Azocar (Independent) | Ind | | 40 | 123 | 157 | 88 | 1,297 | 54 | 351 | 139 | 93 | 75 | 23 | 132 | 2,572 | 1.98% | 0 | 2,572 | 1.98% | 0 |
| Valid votes | | | 5,133 | 6,781 | 6,658 | 5,691 | 59,201 | 3,564 | 16,533 | 7,883 | 4,920 | 5,711 | 3,479 | 4,510 | 130,064 | 100.00% | 4 | 130,064 | 100.00% | 4 |
| Blank votes | | | 550 | 488 | 624 | 1,049 | 2,470 | 305 | 1,034 | 727 | 367 | 395 | 161 | 242 | 8,412 | 5.86% | | | | |
| Rejected votes – other | | | 199 | 237 | 301 | 306 | 2,247 | 98 | 659 | 398 | 176 | 186 | 99 | 143 | 5,049 | 3.52% | | | | |
| Total polled | | | 5,882 | 7,506 | 7,583 | 7,046 | 63,918 | 3,967 | 18,226 | 9,008 | 5,463 | 6,292 | 3,739 | 4,895 | 143,525 | 46.81% | | | | |
| Registered electors | | | 12,019 | 15,232 | 15,642 | 15,801 | 140,080 | 8,772 | 37,759 | 19,632 | 11,114 | 13,154 | 7,699 | 9,721 | 306,625 | | | | | |
| Turnout | | | 48.94% | 49.28% | 48.48% | 44.59% | 45.63% | 45.22% | 48.27% | 45.88% | 49.15% | 47.83% | 48.56% | 50.35% | 46.81% | | | | | |

The following candidates were elected: Fidel Espinoza (PS), 27,999 votes; Javier Hernández (UDI), 16,367 votes; Harry Jürgensen (RN), 20,531 votes; and Emilia Nuyado (PS), 15,981 votes.
