= Emilia Nuyado =

Chilean politician (born 1968)

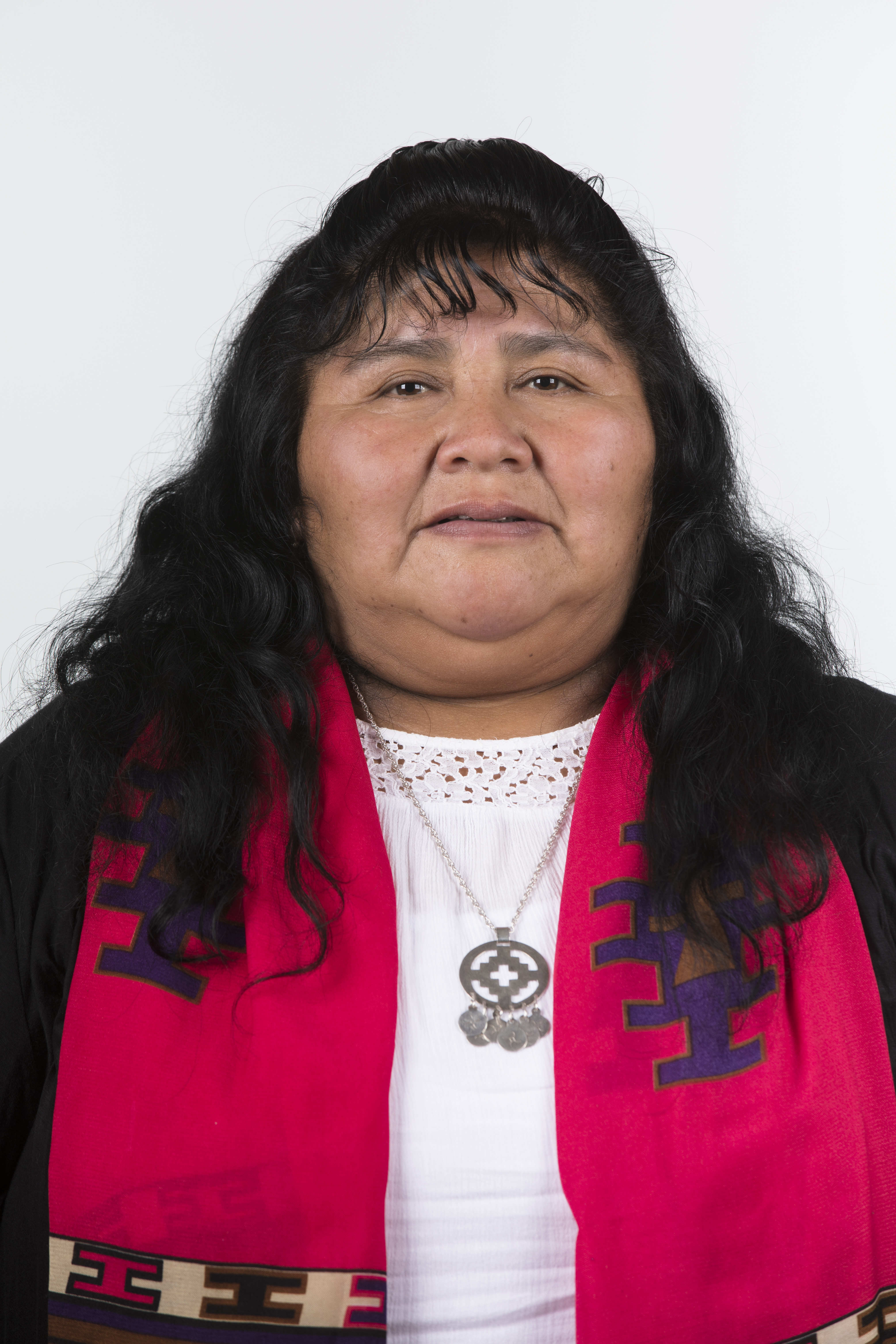
- Official portrait, 2018

Member of the Chamber of Deputies
- Incumbent
- Assumed office 11 March 2018
- Constituency: District 25

Member of the Council of San Pablo
- In office 6 December 2000 – 6 December 2016

Personal details
- Born: Emilia Iris Nuyado Ancapichún; 17 August 1968 (age 58) Río Negro, Chile
- Party: Socialist (2000–present)
- Education: University of Los Lagos
- Occupation: Politician

Emilia Iris Nuyado Ancapichún (San Pablo, August 17, 1968) is a Chilean politician of Mapuche-Huilliche descent.

Since March 11, 2018 she has been a member of the Chamber of Deputies representing District 25 in the Los Lagos Region. She also became one of the first two Mapuche women elected to the Chilean Congress, together with her conservative counterpart Aracely Leuquén.

== Biography ==
She was born in Huancahincul on 17 August 1968, in the commune of San Pablo, Los Lagos Region. She is the daughter of Florindo Nuyado Nuyado and Sabina Ancapichún Ancapichún. She comes from a Mapuche-Huilliche family and has nine siblings.

=== Professional career ===
She completed her primary education at the school of Lololhue in San Pablo and later at the Quilacahuín Mission School in the same commune. She completed her secondary education at the Instituto Comercial de Osorno.

She pursued studies in accounting at the Instituto Profesional de Osorno and later studied Social Planning and Auditing at the University of Los Lagos.

== Political career ==
She has more than 25 years of public experience in indigenous social organizations, particularly in rural women's committees and within the Huacahuincul indigenous community.

She has been a member of the Socialist Party (PS) since 2000.

Between 2000 and 2016, she served as councillor of the commune of San Pablo in the Los Lagos Region for four consecutive terms. She was elected with 467 votes (7.84%) in 2000, 943 votes (16.28%) in 2004, 607 votes (10.30%) in 2008, and 687 votes (12.57%) in 2012.

She served as a representative of the Mapuche-Huilliche people (from Panguipulli to Chiloé) in the National Corporation for Indigenous Development (CONADI), acting as National Councillor for the periods 2004–2008, 2008–2012, and 2016–2020.

In the parliamentary elections held in 2017, she was elected Deputy for the 25th District of the Los Lagos Region—comprising the communes of Fresia, Frutillar, Llanquihue, Los Muermos, Osorno, Puerto Octay, Puerto Varas, Puyehue, Purranque, Río Negro, San Juan de la Costa, and San Pablo—representing the Socialist Party of Chile within the La Fuerza de la Mayoría pact for the 2018–2022 term. She obtained 8,149 votes, equivalent to 6.27% of the valid votes cast.

In August 2021, she ran for re-election in the same district. In the parliamentary elections held in November 2021, she was re-elected representing the Socialist Party of Chile within the New Social Pact list, obtaining 15,981 votes, corresponding to 11.60% of the valid votes cast.
