= Llanquihue =

Llanquihue (Spanish: [ʎaŋˈkiwe; ʝaŋ-; ɟʝaŋ-]) may refer to:

- Lake Llanquihue, the second largest lake in Chile
- Llanquihue Province, a province of Chile located in the southern Los Lagos Region
- Llanquihue, Chile, a Chilean commune and city in Llanquihue Province, Los Lagos Region
- Llanquihue River, a river in the commune of Panguipulli, southern Chile
