= Quilpe Airport =

- IATA: none; ICAO: SCSQ

Summary
- Airport type: Public
- Serves: San Pablo
- Elevation AMSL: 157 ft / 48 m
- Coordinates: 40°20′25″S 73°19′15″W

Map
- Location of Quilpe Airport in Chile

Runways
Direction	Length		Surface
Direction	m	ft	Surface
06/24	652	2,139	Grass
- Sources: Landings.com Google Maps GCM

Quilpe Airport (ICAO: SCSQ) is an airstrip serving San Pablo, a town and commune in the Los Lagos Region of Chile.

The airstrip is 28 kilometres (17 mi) northwest of Osorno, and runs alongside the banks of the Rahue River at its confluence into the Bueno River. There is rising terrain west through north.

== See also ==
- Transport in Chile
- List of airports in Chile
