= Puaucho =

- Interactive map of Puaucho
- Coordinates: 40°36′17″S 73°18′13″W
- Region: Los Lagos
- Province: Osorno
- Municipality: San Juan de la Costa
- Commune: San Juan de la Costa

Government
  - Type: Municipal
  - Alcade: Bernardo Candia Henríquez (DC)
- Elevation: 124 m (407 ft)

Population (2017)
  - Total: 305

Sex
  - Men: 152
  - Women: 153
- Time zone: UTC−04:00 (Chilean Standard)
  - Summer (DST): UTC−03:00 (Chilean Daylight)
- Area code: Country + town = 56 + 64
- Climate: Cfb

Puaucho is a hamlet (Spanish: caserío) located in the West of Osorno Province, southern Chile. Puaucho is the administrative centre of San Juan de la Costa commune. In 2017 Puaucho had a population of 305 inhabitants up from 300 in 2002.
