= Tomás Burgos =

Chilean philanthropist

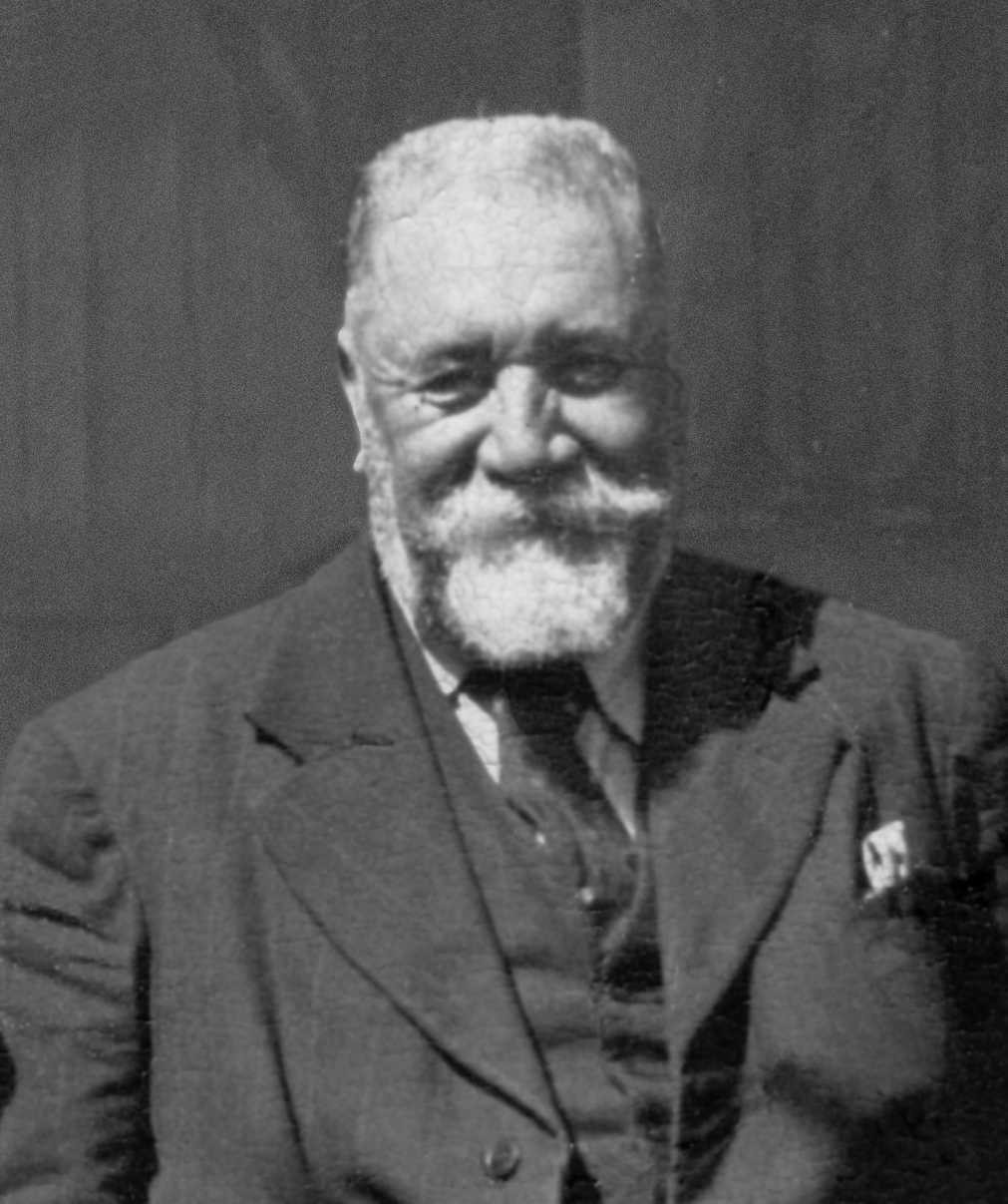
Tomás Burgos

Tomás Burgos Sotomayor (September 18, 1875 in Osorno – August 19, 1945 in Valdivia) was a Chilean philanthropist, one of the strongest supporters of the "mutualist movement" and the founder of "Villa Lo Burgos", the present city of Purranque.

== About ==
Sotomayor was the son of Bartolo Burgos and Vicenta Sotomayor, from the line of old families that repopulated Osorno in the 18th century. He studied in the "Liceo Alemán de Osorno" (German school of Osorno), and started to work very young in a law office. He also participated in social and musical clubs. In 1891 he joined the then fledgling mutualist movement in Chile, and became one of the founders of the "Sociedad Unión de Artesanos de Osorno" (Society of Artisans of Osorno - a union of workers that provided welfare benefits to its members), of which he was president several times.

On April 18, 1911 he founded Villa Lo Burgos de Purranquil, in a plot of land along the railroad line between the cities of Osorno and Puerto Montt. After many problems, he managed to plan and build the city, helped to bring the first settlers, and organized the first institutions. With time this hamlet grew to become the present city of Purranque. He married Sofía Rosas Durán, daughter of Felix Rosas Manrique de Lara, and had four children: Victor, Pedro, Francisco and Pablo. He died in the city of Valdivia, in 1945, at the age of 70.
