= Osorno Province =

Osorno Province Provincia de Osorno
- Province
- Seal

- Location in the Los Lagos Region

- Location in Chile
- Coordinates: 40°35′S 73°10′W
- Country: Chile
- Region: Los Lagos
- Named for: Osorno la Mayor, Spain
- Capital: Osorno
- Communes: List of 7: Osorno; Puerto Octay; Purranque; Puyehue; Río Negro; San Pablo; San Juan de la Costa

Government
  - Type: Provincial
  - Governor: Daniel Lilayu Vivanco (UDI)

Area
  - Total: 9,223.7 km^{2} (3,561.3 sq mi)
  - Rank: 3

Population (2012 census)
  - Total: 221,496
  - Rank: 2
  - Density: 24.014/km^{2} (62.195/sq mi)
  - Urban: 163,808
  - Rural: 57,701

Sex
  - Male: 110,048
  - Female: 111,461
- Time zone: UTC-4 (CLT)
  - Summer (DST): UTC-3 (CLT)
- Area code: 56 + 64
- Website: Government of Osorno

Osorno Province (Spanish: Provincia de Osorno) is one of the four provinces in the southern Chilean region of Los Lagos (X). The province has an area of 9,223.7 km^{2} (3,561 sq mi) and a population of 221,496 distributed across seven communes (Spanish: comunas). The provincial capital is the city of Osorno.

Osorno is a city located in southern Chile a territory of northern Patagonia in the Los Lagos Region. The Chilean Patagonia starts at Latitude 39° South in Valdivia and then it continues through the Chiloe Island and the fiords that continue its course south through the Pacific Ocean and the Cordillera de los Andes until it reaches Latitude 56° South at Cape Horn.The province possesses one of the most frequented mountain passes of Chile, the Cardenal Antonio Samoré Pass which links the province with Villa La Angostura and San Carlos de Bariloche in Argentina.

== Administration ==
As a province, Osorno is a second-level administrative division, governed by a provincial governor who is appointed by the president. The Osorno Province comprises seven communes; each commune is governed by its own municipality, headed by an alcalde:

- Osorno
- Puerto Octay
- Purranque
- Puyehue
- Río Negro
- San Pablo
- San Juan de la Costa

== History ==
The first inhabitants of the area were the indigenous Huilliche people. Osorno also featured largely in German Colonization in Chile, which took place in the 19th century, when the Chilean government brought German settlers to assist in the growth of the region.

== Ethnocultural demography ==
The Osorno province owes its legacy to fairly recent Chilean settlement, when the government subdued the region's indigenous Mapuche peoples in the mid-19th century and opened the land to Chilean and European immigration soon to follow. Large percentage of locals in Osorno are descendants of Spanish (the livestock grazing industry owes its foundation to the Basques) and other European immigrants.

In Osorno, there are historic ties and bonds with the Dutch, British esp. Scots with some Irish and English, French, Germans including Austrians and Swiss, Italians, Portuguese, ex-Yugoslavians, Greeks and from the Middle East are Arabs and Palestinians. These ethnic groups came in the late 19th century and early 20th century period.

The provincial cultural heritage is shaped by Huilliche, Spanish, and German influences. Around 1850, the government of Chile began inviting German settlers to the colony to promote growth in the region; the settlers found Osorno's climate and geography to be very similar to their own. With their help, Osorno was made the home of the national cattle ranch of Chile, boosting the regional economy significantly. Present-day Osorno has preserved 19th-century architecture and urban layout, represented by six houses which have been designated national monuments.

== Economic activity ==
The main economic activity in the province is livestock, Osorno being one of the most important agricultural centers of Chile, which is identified with the slogan "Land of Milk and Meat of Chile". Another important economic activity is tourism.

Tourist destinations in the province include:

- Lake and mountainous communes of Puerto Octay and Puyehue, where the German migrated influence is evident; mainly in construction and catering. The main tourist attractions in the area are its lakes: Llanquihue, Puyehue and Rupanco with multiple beaches each; Puyehue National Park (tourist centre which has the Hot spring and Baths of Puyehue and Aguas Calientes; and Antillanca ski resort).
- Communes central of Osorno and San Pablo, where Osorno city identifies itself with the slogan "City-Park of Chile". Osorno city is also a tourist centre in the province.
- Coastal communes of Purranque, Rio Negro and San Juan de la Costa, presenting a wide coastal area, rich in natural resources, and ecotourism and ethnotourism. Attractions include the beaches at Pucatrihue and Maicolpue. Also this zone presents wildlife reserves created by the original inhabitants of ethnic Huilliche, such as the Network of Community Parks Mapu Lahual, associated with marine and coastal protected area Lafken Mapu Lahual.
