= Llanquihue Lake =

Lake in Los Lagos Region, Chile

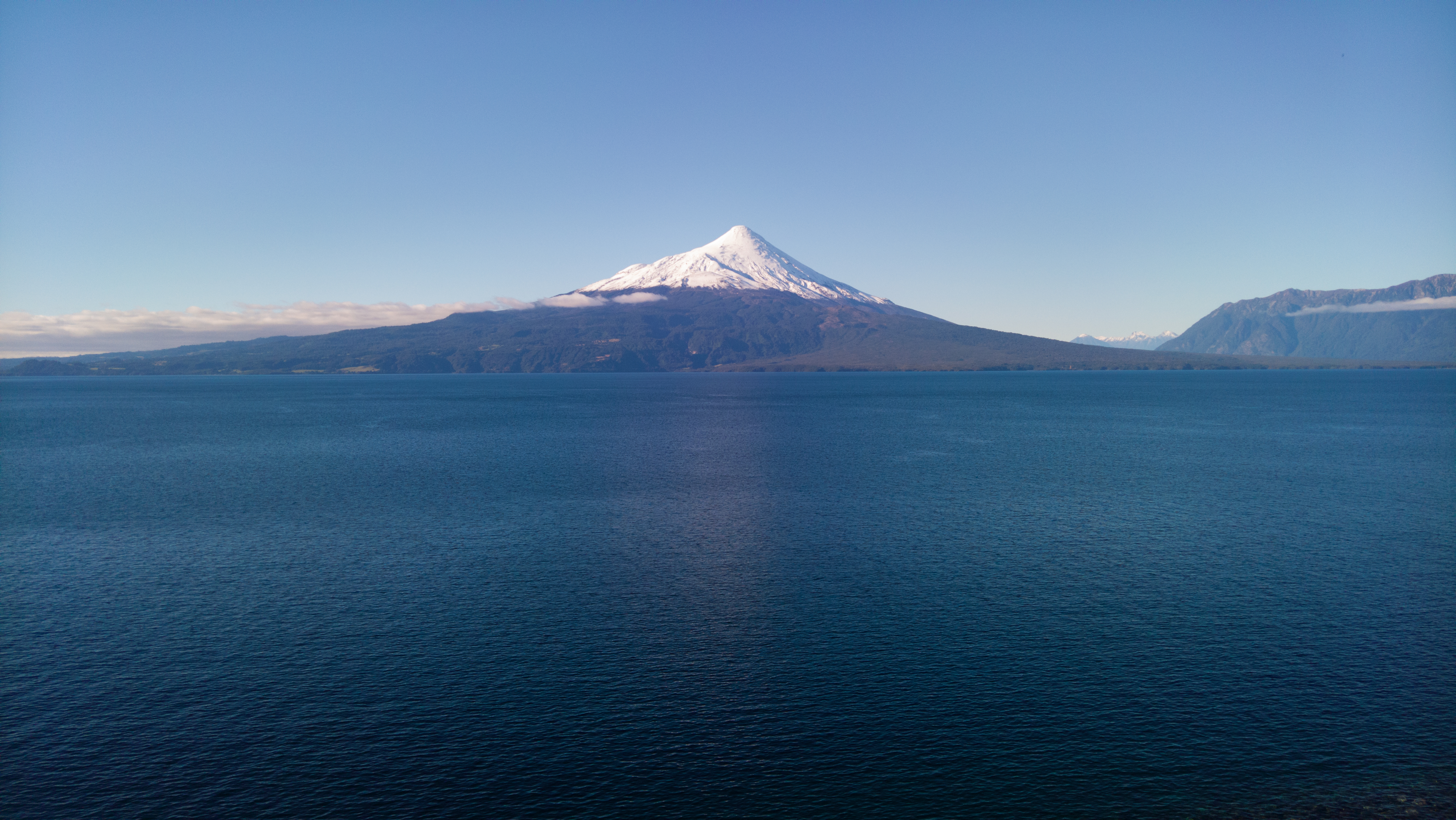
- Osorno Volcano and Llanquihue Lake from Los Riscos area, by the highway that goes from Puerto Varas to Ensenada town.

- Location within Chile
- Location: Llanquihue Province and Osorno Province
- Coordinates: 41°08′S 72°47′W
- Primary outflows: Maullín River
- Catchment area: 4,738 km^{2} (1,829 sq mi)
- Basin countries: Chile
- Max. length: 40 km (25 mi)
- Max. width: 32 km (20 mi)
- Surface area: 871 km^{2} (336 sq mi)
- Average depth: 182 m (597 ft)
- Max. depth: 317 m (1,040 ft)
- Water volume: 158.6 km^{3} (38.1 cu mi)
- Shore length^{1}: 197 km (122 mi)
- Surface elevation: 51 m (167 ft)
- Frozen: never
- Settlements: Puerto Varas, Llanquihue, Frutillar, Puerto Octay, Las Cascadas
- ^{1} Shore length is not a well-defined measure.

Llanquihue Lake is the second-largest lake in Chile with an area of about 871 km^{2} (336 sq mi), after Lake General Carrera which is shared with Argentina. It is situated in the southern Los Lagos Region in the Llanquihue and Osorno provinces. The lake's fan-like form was created by successive piedmont glaciers during the Quaternary glaciations. The last glacial period is called Llanquihue glaciation in Chile after the terminal moraine systems around the lake.

Some historians consider Llanquihue Lake to have been within the range of ancient Chono nomadism.

Llanquihue Lake is located in southern Chile a territory of northern Patagonia in the Los Lagos Region. The lake's views of Volcán Osorno make the surrounding cities such as Puerto Varas tourism hotspots.

== Gallery ==
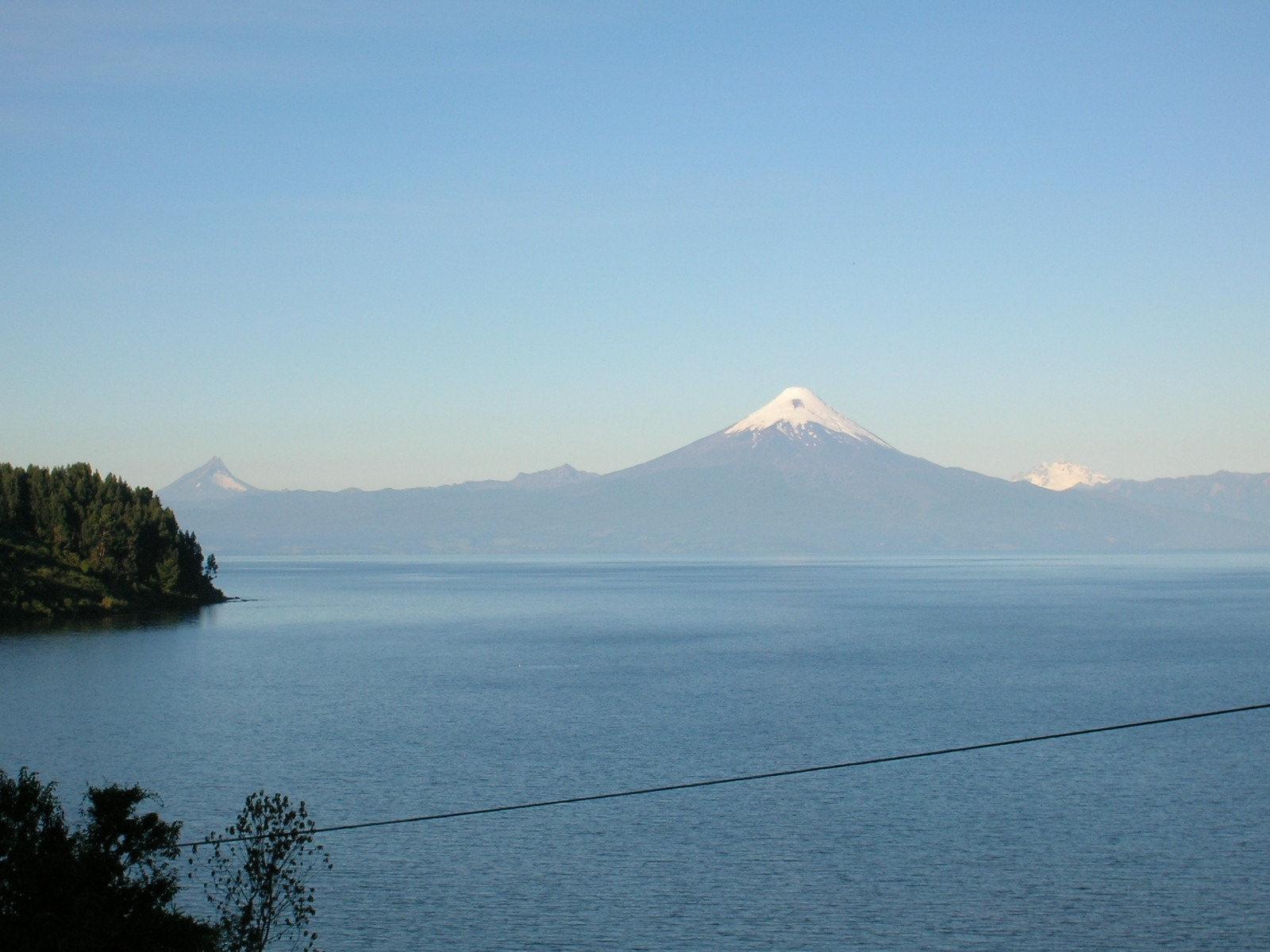
A view of the Osorno volcano from across the lake
