= Llanquihue Province =

Llanquihue Province Provincia de Llanquihue
- Province
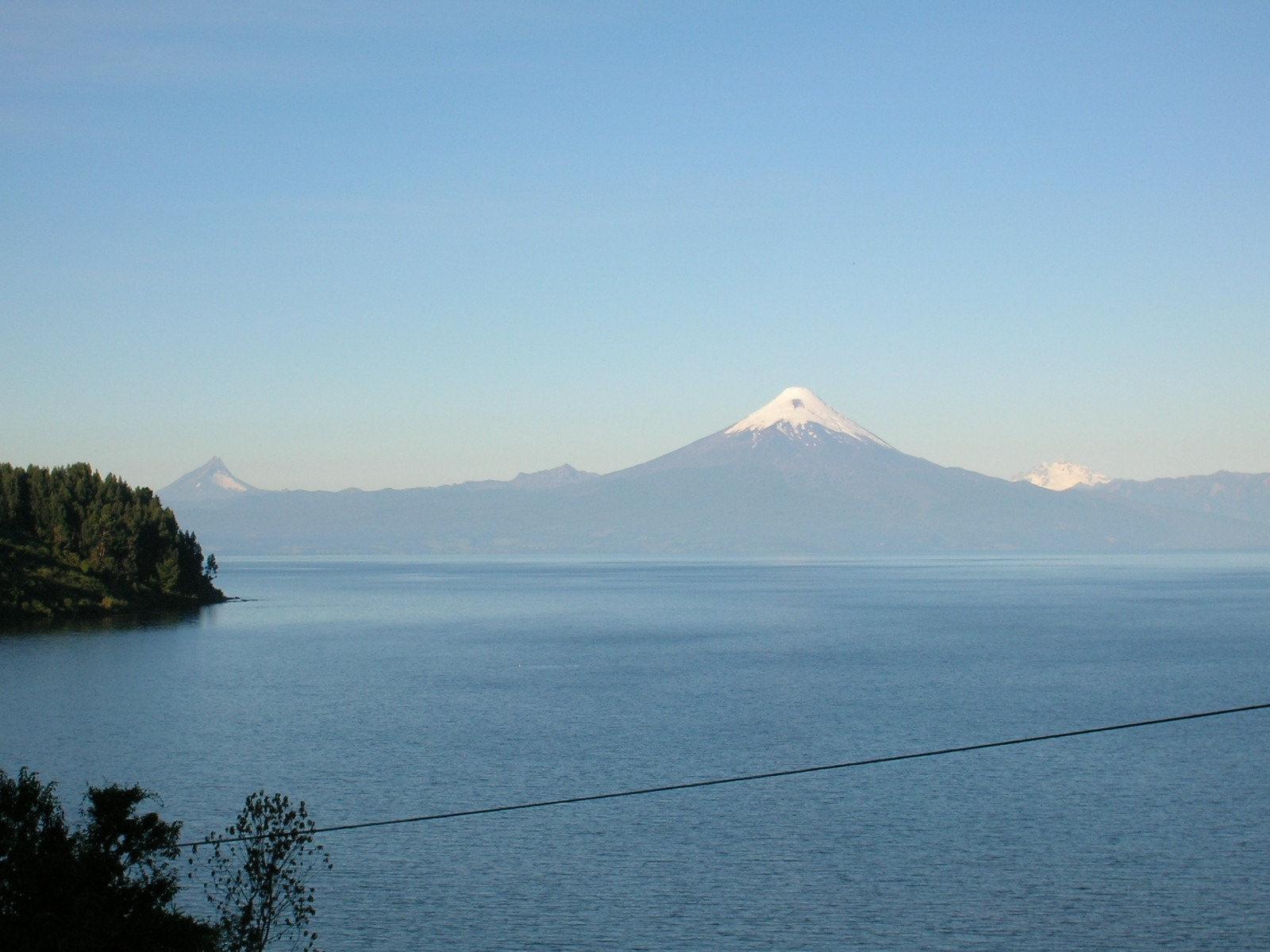
- Llanquihue Lake and the Osorno Volcano

- Seal

- Location in the Los Lagos Region

- Location in Chile
- Coordinates: 41°20′S 72°50′W
- Country: Chile
- Region: Los Lagos
- Capital: Puerto Montt
- Communes: List of 9: Calbuco; Cochamó; Fresia; Frutillar; Llanquihue; Los Muermos; Maullín; Puerto Montt; Puerto Varas

Government
  - Type: Provincial
  - Governor: Leticia Oyarce Kruger (UDI)

Area
  - Total: 14,876.4 km^{2} (5,743.8 sq mi)

Population (2012 Census)
  - Total: 368,127
  - Density: 24.7457/km^{2} (64.0911/sq mi)
  - Urban: 232,962
  - Rural: 88,531

Sex
  - Men: 162,636
  - Women: 158,857
- Time zone: UTC-4 (CLT)
  - Summer (DST): UTC-3 (CLST)
- Area code: 56 + 65
- Website: Government of Llanquihue

Llanquihue Province (Spanish: Provincia de Llanquihue) is one of four provinces of the Chilean region of Los Lagos (X). Its capital is Puerto Montt.

The region is well known for the beauty of its natural environment as well as for the food and seafood from the ports of Puerto Montt and Calbuco.

== Settlement history ==
European settlement of Llanquihue began in 1852 when Germans were encouraged to immigrate to southern Chile and took up wheat farming. A century later, a new wave of Jewish refugees came from Germany in 1945.

== Geography ==
Chile's second largest lake, Lake Llanquihue, is located in the province as well as four volcanoes: Osorno, Calbuco, Puntiagudo and Cerro Tronador.

Llanquihue is a region of forests, rivers and lakes, and the greater part is mountainous. In addition to Lake Llanquihue, there are other large lakes in the eastern part of the province—Puyehue, on the northern frontier, Rupanco, and Todos los Santos. The Calbuco and Osorno volcanoes rise from near its eastern shores, the latter to a height of 7,382 feet (2,250 m).

The outlet of Lake Llanquihue is through Maullín River, the lower course of which is navigable. The other large rivers of the province are the Bueno, which receives the waters of Lakes Puyehue and Rupanco, and the Puelo, which has its rise in a lake of the same name in Argentina. A short tortuous river in this vicinity, called the Petrohué, affords an outlet for the picturesque lake of Todos los Santos, and enters the Reloncaví Sound near the Puelo. The southern coast of the province is indented by a number of inlets and bays affording good fishing.

== Administration ==
As a province, Llanquihue is a second-level administrative division of Chile, governed by a municipality for each constituent commune (Spanish: comuna). Puerto Montt is the provincial capital. The provincial governor is Francisco Le-Bretón as appointed by the President of Chile.

=== Communes ===
- Calbuco
- Cochamó
- Fresia
- Frutillar
- Llanquihue
- Los Muermos
- Maullín
- Puerto Montt
- Puerto Varas

== Geography and demography ==
According to the 2002 census by the National Statistics Institute (INE), the province spans an area of 14,876.4 km^{2} (5,744 sq mi) and had a population of 321,493 inhabitants (162,636 men and 158,857 women), giving it a population density of 21.6/km^{2} (56/sq mi). Of these, 232,962 (72.5%) lived in urban and 88,531 (27.5%) in rural areas. Between the 1992 and 2002 censuses, the population grew by 22.4% (58,931 persons).

=== Cities ===
- Frutillar
- Puerto Montt
- Puerto Varas
- Llanquihue
- Fresia
- Calbuco
