= San Juan de la Costa =

- Commune
- Location of the San Juan de la Costa commune in Los Lagos Region Location in Chile
- Coordinates: 40°31′S 73°24′W
- Country: Chile
- Region: Los Lagos
- Province: Osorno
- Founded: October 26, 1979

Government
  - Type: Municipality
  - Alcalde: Bernardo Candia Henríquez (DC)

Area
  - Total: 1,517 km^{2} (586 sq mi)

Population (2002 Census)
  - Total: 8,831
  - Density: 5.821/km^{2} (15.08/sq mi)
  - Urban: 902
  - Rural: 7,929

Sex
  - Men: 4,814
  - Women: 4,017
- Time zone: UTC-4 (Chile Time (CLT))
  - Summer (DST): UTC-3 (Chile Summer Time (CLST))
- Area code: 56 +
- Website: www.sanjuandelacosta.cl

San Juan de la Costa is a commune of Chile, located in the Osorno Province in the Los Lagos Region. The administration (municipalidad) is located at the hamlet of Puaucho, 34 km west of Osorno. San Juan de la Costa is known for a large proportion of its population being indigenous Huilliches. This commune is characterized by a large coastline suitable for ecotourism, especially balnearios Pucatrihue and Maicolpue, the port of Bahía Mansa, and the ethnic tourism of the Huilliche culture.

== Demographics ==
Historical population
Year	Pop.	±% p.a.
1970	9,522	—
1982	8,449	−0.99%
1992	9,778	+1.47%
2002	8,831	−1.01%
2017	7,512	−1.07%
2024	7,776	+0.49%
Source: "Censo de Población y Vivienda". National Statistics Institute.

According to the 2002 census of the National Statistics Institute, San Juan de la Costa spans an area of 1,517 km^{2} (586 sq mi) and has 8,831 inhabitants (4,814 men and 4,017 women). Of these, 902 (10.2%) lived in urban areas and 7,929 (89.8%) in rural areas. The population fell by 9.7% (947 persons) between the 1992 and 2002 censuses.

== Administration ==
As a commune, San Juan de la Costa is a third-level administrative division of Chile administered by a municipal council, headed by an alcalde who is directly elected every four years. The 2008-2012 alcalde is Javier Oyarzo Ruiz (RN).

Within the electoral divisions of Chile, San Juan de la Costa is represented in the Chamber of Deputies by Javier Hernández (UDI) and Sergio Ojeda (PDC) as part of the 55th electoral district, together with Osorno and San Pablo. The commune is represented in the Senate by Camilo Escalona Medina (PS) and Carlos Kuschel Silva (RN) as part of the 17th senatorial constituency (17).
