= Puerto Octay =

- Town and Commune
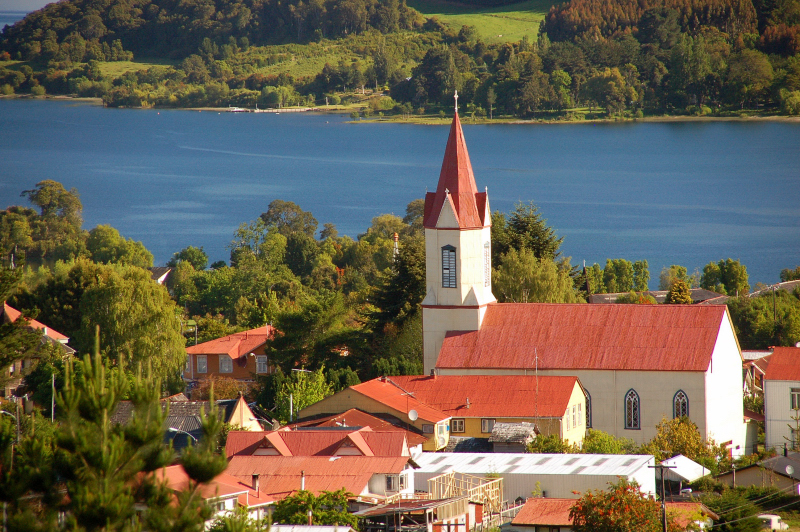
- View of Puerto Octay

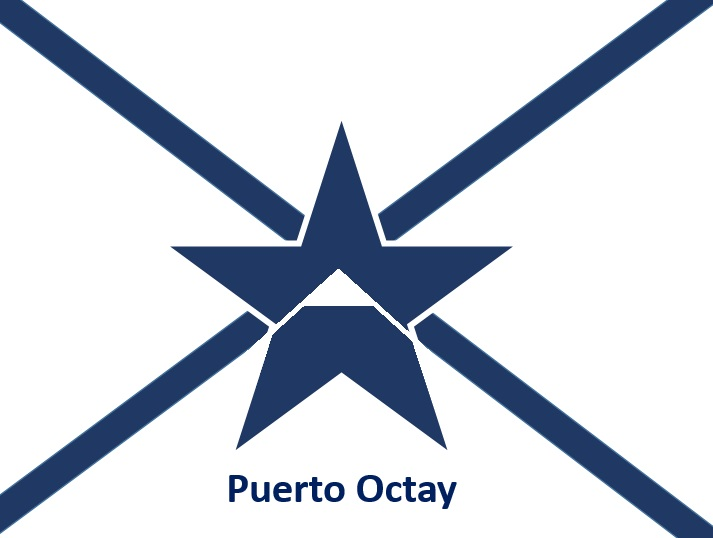
- Flag Coat of arms Location of Puerto Octay commune in Los Lagos Region Location in Chile
- Coordinates (town): 40°58′S 72°54′W
- Country: Chile
- Region: Los Lagos
- Province: Osorno
- Founded: 22 December 1891

Government
  - Type: Municipality
  - Mayor: María Elena Ojeda (Independent)

Area
  - Total: 1,795.7 km^{2} (693.3 sq mi)

Population (2002 Census)
  - Total: 10,236
  - Density: 5.7003/km^{2} (14.764/sq mi)
  - Urban: 3,403
  - Rural: 6,833

Sex
  - Men: 5,391
  - Women: 4,845
- Time zone: UTC-4 (CLT)
  - Summer (DST): UTC-3 (CLST)
- Area code: 56 + 64
- Climate: Cfb
- Website: Municipality of Puerto Octay

Puerto Octay is a town and commune in Osorno Province located on the north shore of Llanquihue Lake in Los Lagos Region in the south of Chile. It was settled by German colonists in 1852. Puerto Octay was an important port with regular traffic to Puerto Varas before the railway opened in 1912.

== Etymology ==
It is said that in 1860, a mill, a distillery and a big store owned by German settler Cristino Ochs were raised in the area. This venue offered all the products demanded by the very few denizens the region of Lake Llanquihue used to have in those days.

Due to the good provision of the store, the slogan of the town was Donde Ochs hay (You can find it at Ochs’, literally Where there is Ochs), which gradually Hispanized into ”Octay”.

== History ==
Its origin dates back to the German colonization in the Southern Chile in 1852 driven by Bernhard Philippi. Years later it became one of the major ports on Lake Llanquihue, joining this city with Puerto Varas, Llanquihue and Frutillar by means of steamships. On 22 December 1891 the municipality was established, under the Presidency of the Republic Jorge Montt.

== German Heritage ==
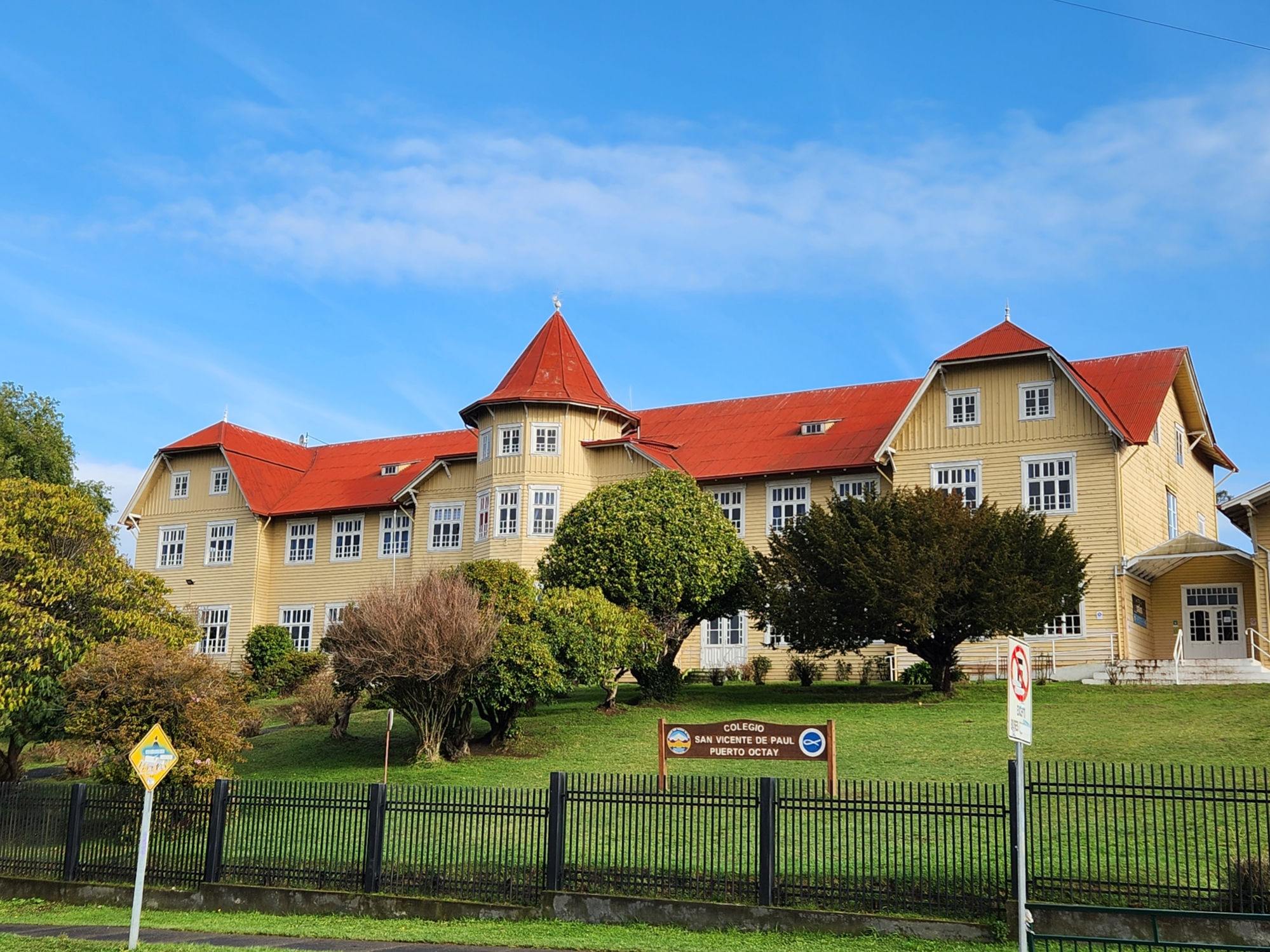
School with typical German architecture in Puerto Octay.

Puerto Octay currently has a rich and varied architecture, mostly built of wood, which is the historical reflection of the colonization process, driven by the State of Chile in the mid-nineteenth century, with families coming from Germany.

Some prominent buildings are the House Niklitschek, Hotel Haase, Wulf House, the current Colegio San Vicente de Paul and Werner House. Despite the lapse of more than 100 years, it is still possible to assess this type of buildings.

In order to preserve this architectural heritage, Puerto Octay is currently in the process of being declared a Typical Zone. This will identify a representative area of identity and history, which will be legally protected by the State of Chile.

== Flora and fauna ==
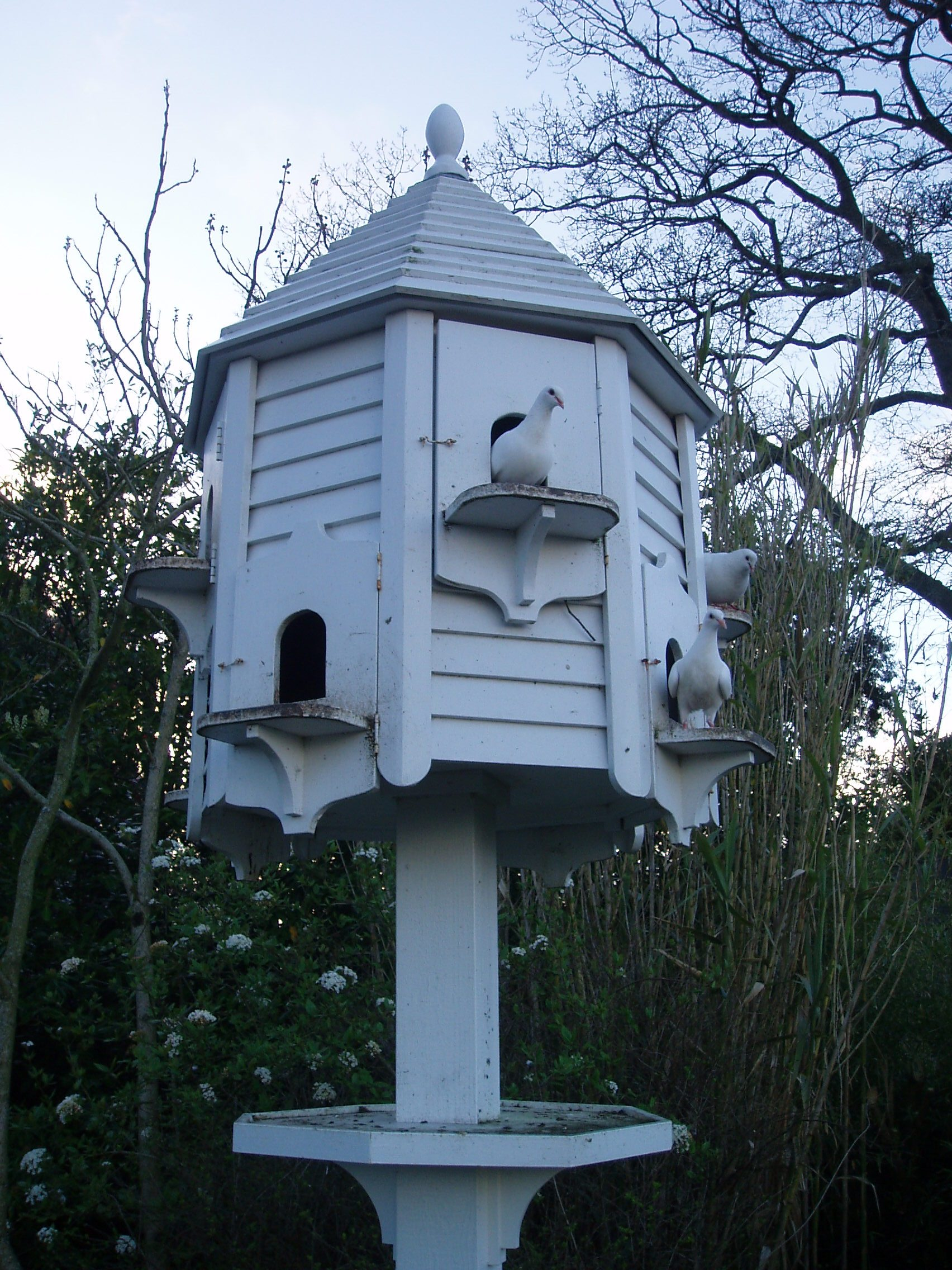
Dove house

Birds: thrush, dove, parrot, rooster from the mountain (extinct), kestrel, heron, sparrows, swallows and buff-necked ibis.

Mammals: cougar, nutria, among others.

Fish: salmon native (locally extinct), mackerel, trout.

== Tourism ==
Puerto Octay on the map

Referring to tourism in the district lake, Lake Llanquihue has beautiful beaches for vacations, fishing and water sports. The most notable include Rupanco Islet, La Baja, Puerto Maitén and Fonck.

== Demographics ==
Historical population
Year	Pop.	±% p.a.
1875	1,721	—
1885	2,303	+2.96%
1895	2,968	+2.57%
1907	3,985	+2.49%
1920	4,725	+1.32%
1930	6,676	+3.52%
1940	8,962	+2.99%
1952	9,961	+0.88%
1970	11,416	+0.76%
1982	10,568	−0.64%
1992	11,051	+0.45%
2002	10,236	−0.76%
2017	8,999	−0.85%
2024	8,865	−0.21%
Source: "Censo de Población y Vivienda". National Statistics Institute.

According to the 2002 census of the National Statistics Institute, Puerto Octay spans an area of 1,795.7 km^{2} (693 sq mi) and has 10,236 inhabitants (5,391 men and 4,845 women). Of these, 3,403 (33.2%) lived in urban areas and 6,833 (66.8%) in rural areas. The population fell by 7.4% (815 persons) between the 1992 and 2002 censuses.

== Administration ==
As a commune, Puerto Octay is a third-level administrative division of Chile administered by a municipal council, headed by an alcalde who is directly elected every four years.

Within the electoral divisions of Chile, Puerto Octay is represented in the Chamber of Deputies by Fidel Espinoza (PS) and Carlos Recondo (UDI) as part of the 56th electoral district, together with Puyehue, Río Negro, Purranque, Fresia, Frutillar, Llanquihue, Puerto Varas and Los Muermos. The commune is represented in the Senate by Camilo Escalona Medina (PS) and Carlos Kuschel Silva (RN) as part of the 17th senatorial constituency (Los Lagos Region).

== Galerie ==
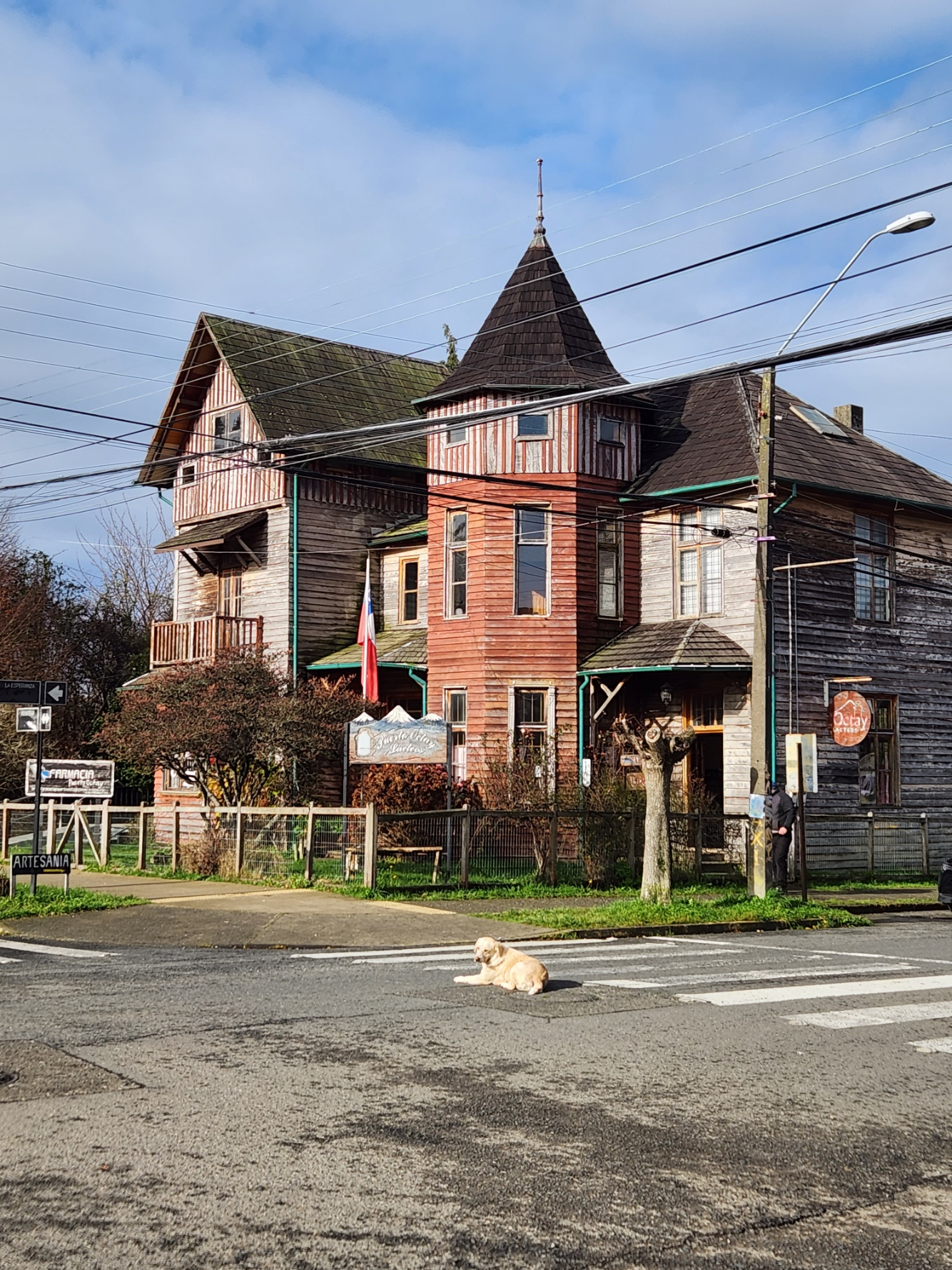
Wulf house

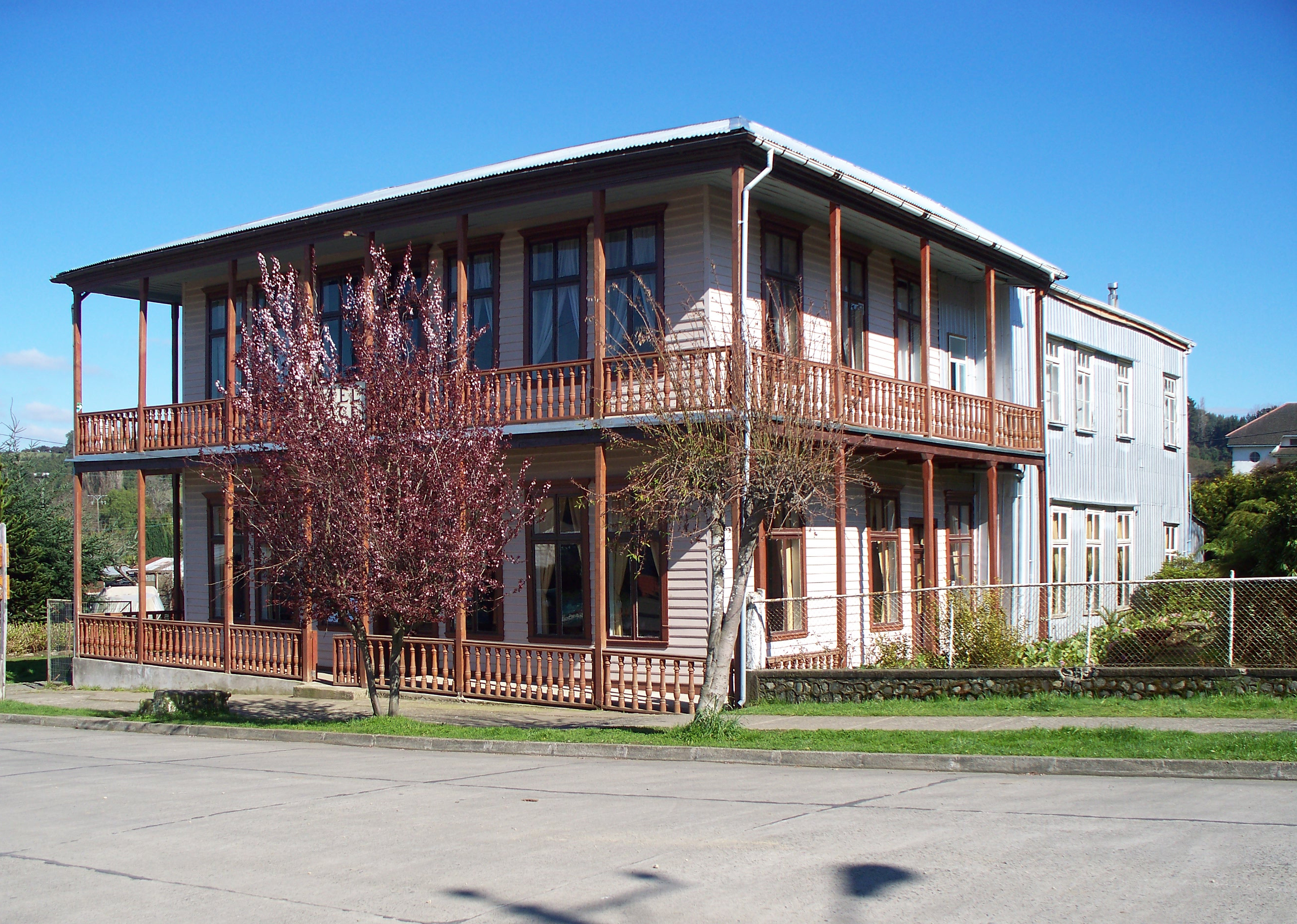
Famous Hasse Hotel, founded in 1894

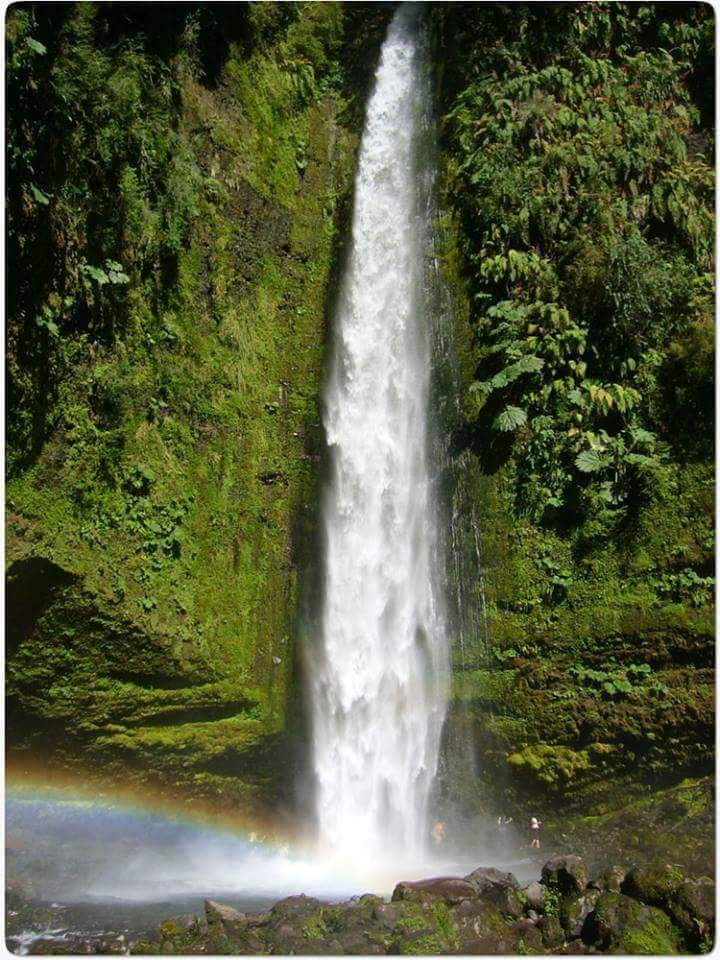
Las Cascadas, 40 km southeast of Puerto Octay

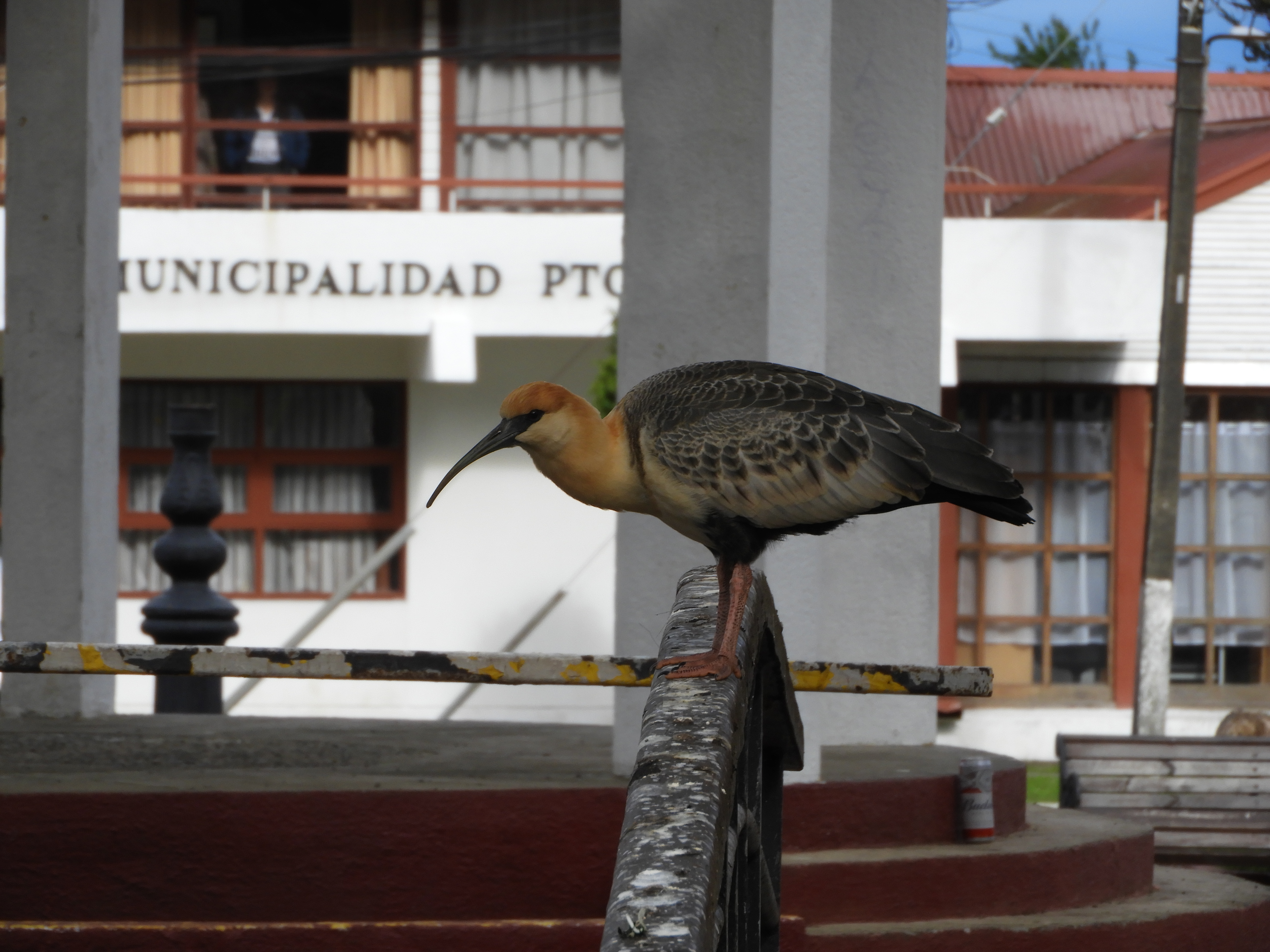
Buff-necked ibis in the city's square

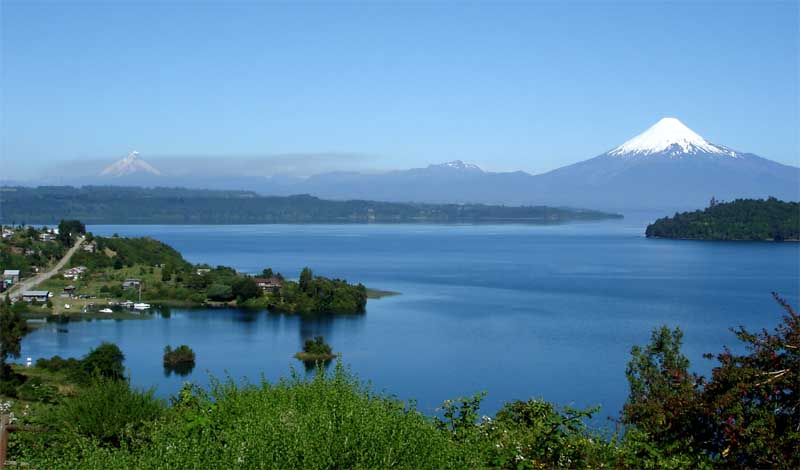
View from Centinela road
