= Puyehue, Chile =

Puyehue
- Commune
- Location of Puyehue communes in Los Lagos Region Location in Chile
- Coordinates: 40°41′S 72°36′W
- Country: Chile
- Region: Los Lagos
- Province: Osorno
- Founded: November 5, 1971

Government
  - Type: Municipality
  - Alcalde: Maria Jimena Núñez Morales (RN)

Area
  - Total: 1,597.9 km^{2} (617.0 sq mi)

Population (2002 Census)
  - Total: 11,368
  - Density: 7.1143/km^{2} (18.426/sq mi)
  - Urban: 3,932
  - Rural: 7,436

Sex
  - Men: 6,008
  - Women: 5,360
- Time zone: UTC-4 (CLT)
  - Summer (DST): UTC-3 (CLST)
- Area code: 56 +
- Website: Municipality of Puyehue

Puyehue (Spanish pronunciation: [puˈʝewe]) is a commune in Chile located in Osorno Province of Los Lagos Region. It is bordered to the south by Rupanco Lake, to the east by the Andes and Argentina, to the north by Puyehue Lake and to the west by Osorno commune. Cardenal Antonio Samoré Pass that links the Los Lagos Region to Argentina lies in the eastern tip of the commune. The comune is administered by Entre Lagos, the main town in Puyehue.

== Demographics ==
Historical population
Year	Pop.	±% p.a.
1970	9,866	—
1982	11,452	+1.25%
1992	11,207	−0.22%
2002	11,368	+0.14%
2017	11,667	+0.17%
2024	11,712	+0.06%
Source: "Censo de Población y Vivienda". National Statistics Institute.

According to the 2002 census of the National Statistics Institute, Puyehue spans an area of 1,597.9 km^{2} (617 sq mi) and has 11,368 inhabitants (6,008 men and 5,360 women). Of these, 3,932 (34.6%) lived in urban areas and 7,436 (65.4%) in rural areas. The population grew by 1.4% (161 persons) between the 1992 and 2002 censuses.

== Administration ==
As a commune, Puyehue is a third-level administrative division of Chile administered by a municipal council, headed by an alcalde who is directly elected every four years.

Within the electoral divisions of Chile, Puyehue is represented in the Chamber of Deputies by Fidel Espinoza (PS) and Carlos Recondo (UDI) as part of the 56th electoral district, together with Río Negro, Purranque, Puerto Octay, Fresia, Frutillar, Llanquihue, Puerto Varas and Los Muermos. The commune is represented in the Senate by Camilo Escalona Medina (PS) and Carlos Kuschel Silva (RN) as part of the 17th senatorial constituency (Los Lagos Region).

Puyehue on the map
