= Frutillar =

- City and Commune
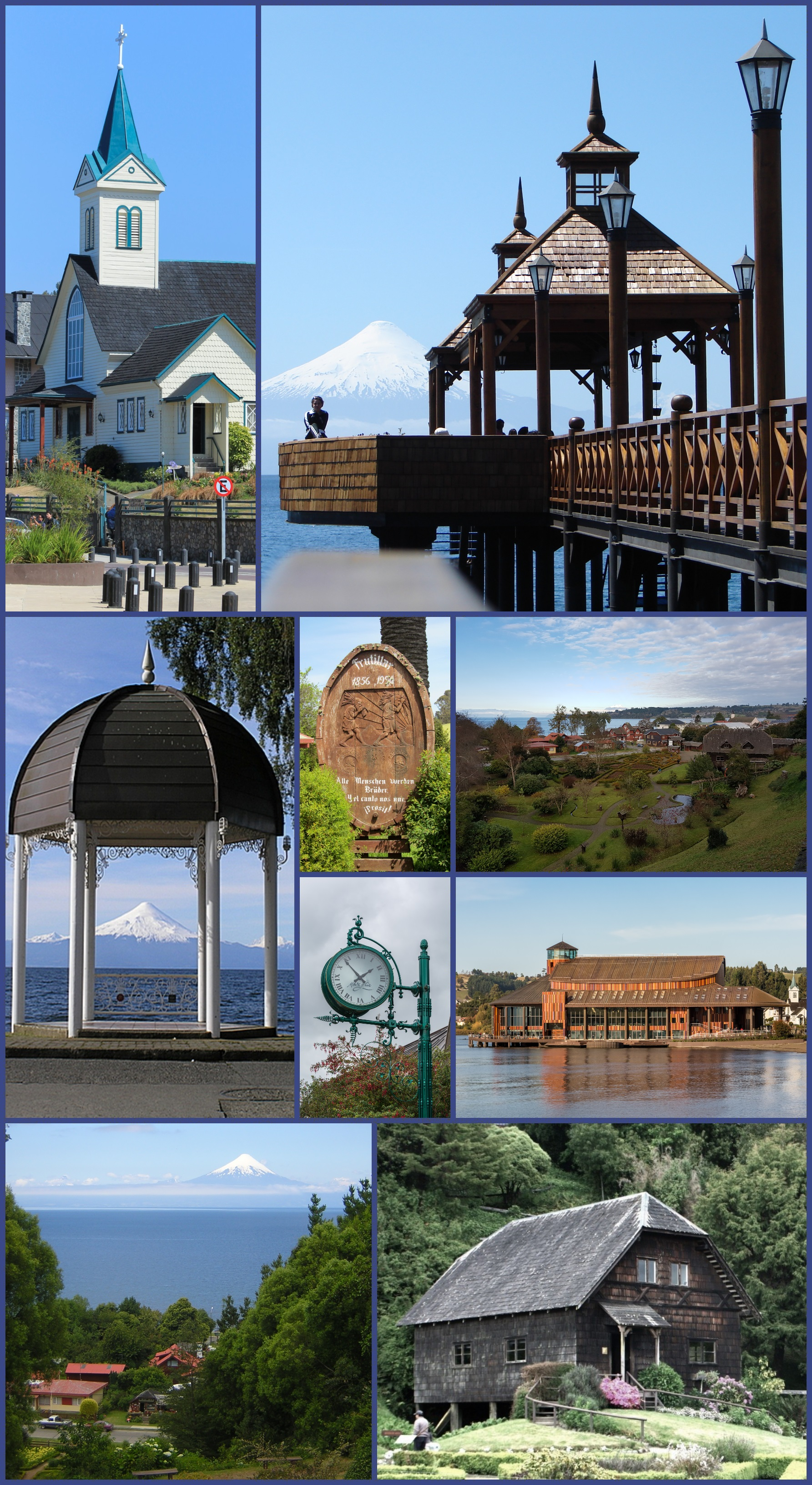
- Top:Frutillar Lutheran Temple, Frutillar Bajo Dock, (left to right) Middle:View of Llanquihue Lake and Osorno Volcano, Francismo Tolo Monument in Bernando Avenue, Frutillar Reloj Monument, Frutillar Baja German Colonial Museum, Frutillar Baja Lke Theater (Teatro del Lago) (left to lower right) Bottom:View of Lake Llanquihue and Osorno Volcano, from Frutillar Bajo, A heritage house in Frutillar German Colonial Museum (left to right)

- Coat of arms Location of Frutillar in Los Lagos Region Location in Chile
- Coordinates (city): 41°07′22″S 73°03′29″W
- Country: Chile
- Region: Los Lagos
- Province: Llanquihue
- Founded as: 23 November 1856
- Founded as: Villa de Frutillar
- Founder: Bernardo Phillipi

Government
  - Type: Municipality
  - Alcalde: Claus Lindemann

Area
  - Total: 831.4 km^{2} (321.0 sq mi)
- Elevation: 62 m (203 ft)

Population (2018 Census)
  - Total: 19,400
  - Density: 23.3/km^{2} (60.4/sq mi)
  - Urban: 9,118
  - Rural: 6,407
- Demonym: Frutillarino

Sex
  - Men: 8,948
  - Women: 8,577
- Time zone: UTC−4 (CLT)
  - Summer (DST): UTC−3 (CLST)
- Area code: 56 + 65
- Website: www.munifrutillar.cl

Frutillar is a city and commune located in southern Chile, Chilean Patagonia, in Llanquihue Province, within the Los Lagos Region, the lake district. The bay of Frutillar is placed on the banks of Lake Llanquihue, the largest lake entirely within Chile. Frutillar is known as the "City of Music", and since 2017 is part of the UNESCO Creative Cities Network (UCCN), becoming the first Chilean city to be nominated, as well as the southernmost Creative City of Music in the world.

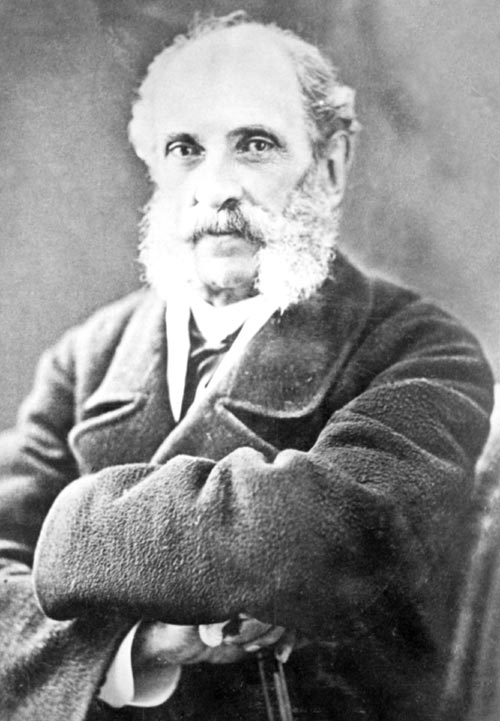
Vicente Pérez Rosales

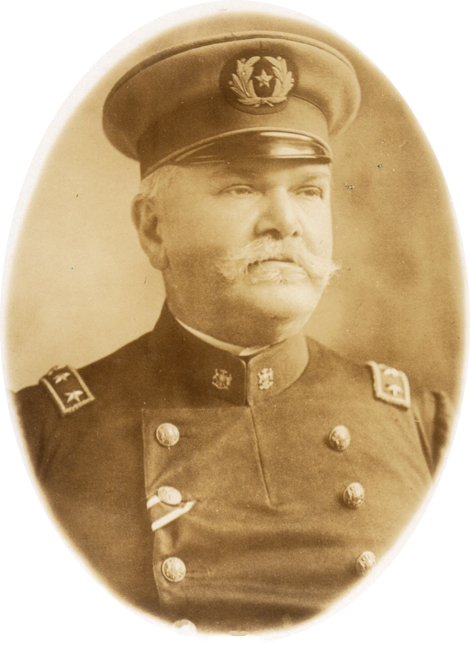
Emil Körner in the uniform of the Army of Chile

== Etymology ==
The name of the city derived from frutilla, the Spanish for "fragaria", precisely from frutilla chilena, the Spanish term for Fragaria chiloensis, also called in Spanish as frutilla blanca, meaning "white fragaria."

== History ==
After a period of clearing up the land, the city of Frutillar was founded by German settlers in 1856, among them Christian Winkler, Wilhelm Kaschel, Heinrich Kuschel, Theodor Niklitschek, Christian Nannig, Christian Scheel and Adams Schmidt.

Vicente Pérez Rosales on a later expedition towards the south of Valdivia changed the course of the incoming colony to Lake Llanquihue. Rosales was searching for more land for the German settlers, south of Valdivia, as many sailing ships were arriving to the port of Valdivia from Germany sent by Bernardo Philippi under the official colonisation program of Southern Chile. This program was granted by President Manuel Bulnes and executed by president of Chile Manuel Montt, officially naming Vicente Perez Rosales the head of the German colonisation of Llanquihue, as a continuation of the initial efforts by Bernard Philippi.

Rosales reached the lake through the dense wild forest and climbed to Osorno Volcano and at the height of 2,000 meters he was able to see the ocean to the south where he saw sailing ships navigating. It was the chilotes from Chiloe that had been sailing in the inner waters of Puerto Montt since 1550 and came mainly from Galicia, Spain, which has very similar climate conditions. He immediately informed this issue to the port of Valdivia and thus, from there on, the settlers started coming in through Puerto Montt and travelled by land to Puerto Varas where other ships would sail the shores of lake Llanquihue to Frutillar and Puerto Octay.

A quote of the time illustrates the discovery of lake Llanquihue during its first sighting by Philippi: "The water of this lake is as clear as that of Geneva in Switzerland, its surface is about seven leagues long and one league wide, so I could not distinguish the opposite bank. On one hand, it has the snowy Alps, the Andes Mountain that rises from its eastern banks of a volcano covered with snow up to half of its height and goes into its waters" (Bernardo Philippi, 1842). This illustrates the period when Philippi discovered Lake Llanquihue and its similarity with Lake Geneva in Switzerland. This information was given to the German settler in order to describe them the beauty of the region. It took over 10 years to be able to bring all the settlers from Germany to Chile and establish the first colonisation program in Lake Llanquihue.

Although Bernhard Eunom Philippi discovered it in 1842, when he was exploring the region with the Chilean army, he brought the idea to the Chilean government that the Southern Region of Chile would be best developed by bringing German settlers that were having a hard time in Germany due to the Industrial Revolution and had plans to migrate to America. This opportunity to attract German families to immigrate to Chile had to be done. The combined effort of Bernhard Eunom Philippi with Vicente Pérez Rosales, made the colonisation a reality and proved to be a success, as the region later was very well developed in agricultural and forestry, with European technology. Also German schools proved to be the best in the Southern region of Chile.

== Local attractions ==
The German Museum, Teatro del Lago, Cofradia Nautica de Frutillar and Patagonia Virgin are today's main attractions in Frutillar.

The German Museum: The museum opens daily and it is located in the centre of the bay of Frutillar, one of the most beautiful touristic villages of Lake Llanquihue. The German Colony that arrived to the city in 1856 built their houses, water mill, warehouse and gardens to live there; the descendants of these settlers decided to leave these buildings for a museum that shows the way they lived. It is composed of a garden, the machine warehouse, the water mill to grind the seeds, and the main house that is located uphill with a great view to the Lake.

Teatro del Lago: Offers concerts all year round and is located in the main coastal road of the bay. The theatre is considered the largest in the country and the best acoustic theatre ever built in South America. Every year the musical festival traditionally conducts a continuous 2 week concert, called Musical Festival or “Semanas Musicales” this takes place at the end of January and the first week of February in the theatre. This cultural activity brings thousand of visitors every year.

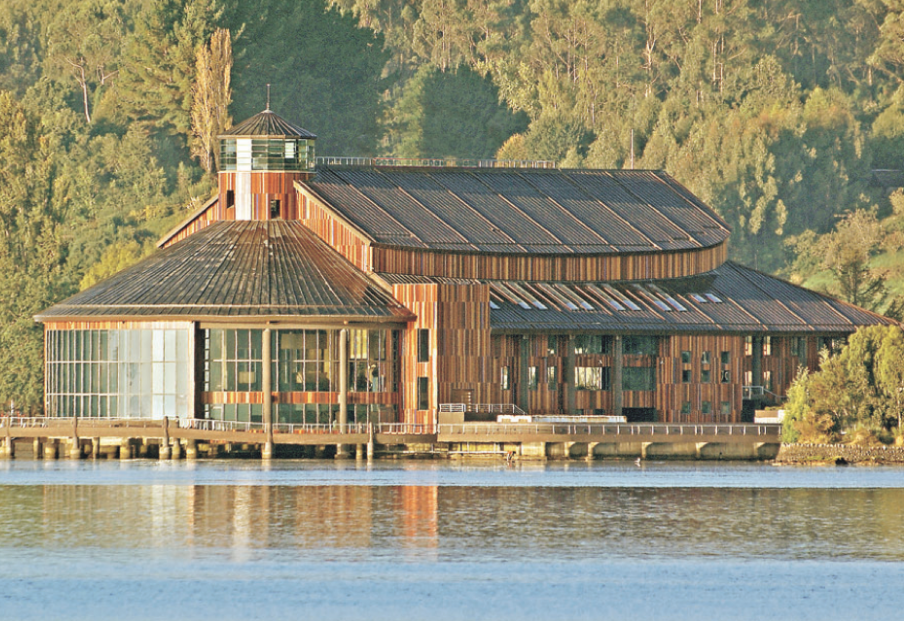
Teatro del lago

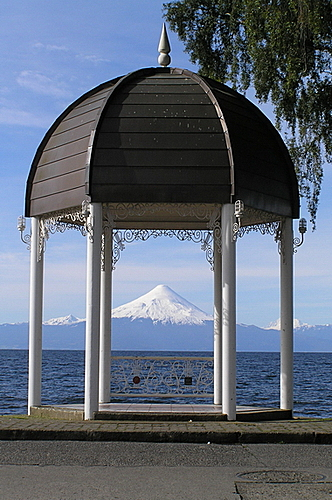

Cofradia Nautica de Frutillar - Yacht Club: Is the lake's largest and best equipped yacht club located in the bay 400 m south of Teatro del Lago, along the coastal road of Frutillar Bay. The club has activity all year; and promotes sailing in all categories. The yacht Club was established in 1986. There are 3 sailing schools in the bay that have been founded and promoted by “Cofradia." Also, during the spring and summer the yacht club makes Regattas on the Bay and around the lake.

Patagonia Virgin: Is a new urban development that will have hotels, commerce, restaurants, golf course Nicklaus, apartments and houses, as well as trekking, polo and tennis. The village, which is at the foot of Patagonia Virgin, will have over 40 stores, shops and restaurants with wild forest and views to all four volcanoes accessing lake Llanquihue through the Frutillar Bay. It is located 200 m south of Cofradia yacht club.

== Demographics ==
Historical population
Year	Pop.	±% p.a.
1875	630	—
1885	1,030	+5.04%
1895	1,489	+3.75%
1907	2,291	+3.66%
1920	4,205	+4.78%
1930	5,779	+3.23%
1940	10,380	+6.03%
1952	11,771	+1.05%
1970	12,326	+0.26%
1982	11,954	−0.26%
1992	13,107	+0.93%
2002	15,525	+1.71%
2017	18,428	+1.15%
2024	22,554	+2.93%
Source: "Censo de Población y Vivienda". National Statistics Institute.

According to the 2002 census of the National Statistics Institute, Frutillar spans an area of 831.4 km^{2} (321 sq mi) and has 15,525 inhabitants (7,948 men and 7,577 women). Of these, 9,118 (58.7%) lived in urban areas and 6,407 (41.3%) in rural areas. The population grew by 18.4% (2,418 persons) between the 1992 and 2002 censuses.

== Administration ==
As a commune, Frutillar is a third-level administrative division of Chile administered by a municipal council, headed by an alcalde (mayor) who is directly elected every four years. The 2016-2020 mayor is Claus Lindemann, independent.

Within the electoral divisions of Chile, Frutillar is represented in the Chamber of Deputies by Fidel Espinoza (PS) and Carlos Recondo (UDI) as part of the 56th electoral district, together with Puyehue, Río Negro, Purranque, Puerto Octay, Fresia, Llanquihue, Puerto Varas and Los Muermos. The commune is represented in the Senate by Camilo Escalona Medina (PS) and Carlos Kuschel Silva (RN) as part of the 17th senatorial constituency (Los Lagos Region).

== Education ==
Previously the area had a German school, the Instituto Alemán Frutillar.

== Surnames ==
Most common surnames and their frequencies in Frutillar as of 2014:

1. Vargas (1:33)
2. González (1:49)
3. Hernández (1:61)
4. Soto (1:63)
5. Mansilla (1:71)
6. Alvarado (1:73)
7. Cárdenas (1:74)
8. Ruiz (1:79)
9. Muñoz (1:87)
10. Díaz (1:89)

== Climate ==
Climate data for Frutillar
Month	Jan	Feb	Mar	Apr	May	Jun	Jul	Aug	Sep	Oct	Nov	Dec	Year
Mean daily maximum °C (°F)	20.0 (68.0)	19.9 (67.8)	17.7 (63.9)	14.8 (58.6)	12.0 (53.6)	10.3 (50.5)	9.8 (49.6)	10.6 (51.1)	12.0 (53.6)	14.4 (57.9)	16.3 (61.3)	18.1 (64.6)	14.7 (58.4)
Daily mean °C (°F)	14.8 (58.6)	14.6 (58.3)	12.8 (55.0)	10.5 (50.9)	8.3 (46.9)	7.1 (44.8)	6.5 (43.7)	6.9 (44.4)	7.7 (45.9)	9.8 (49.6)	11.4 (52.5)	13.2 (55.8)	10.3 (50.5)
Mean daily minimum °C (°F)	9.0 (48.2)	8.9 (48.0)	7.5 (45.5)	6.1 (43.0)	4.6 (40.3)	3.7 (38.7)	3.1 (37.6)	3.1 (37.6)	3.6 (38.5)	5.2 (41.4)	6.2 (43.2)	7.9 (46.2)	5.7 (42.4)
Average precipitation mm (inches)	63.2 (2.49)	65.8 (2.59)	117.6 (4.63)	169.5 (6.67)	217.3 (8.56)	226.2 (8.91)	204.8 (8.06)	175.6 (6.91)	137.7 (5.42)	82.1 (3.23)	92.8 (3.65)	106.5 (4.19)	1,659.1 (65.31)
Average relative humidity (%)	76	78	82	87	87	87	87	85	82	79	78	77	82
Source: Bioclimatografia de Chile
