= Fresia, Chile =

Fresia
- City and Commune
- Map of Fresia commune in Los Lagos Region Location in Chile
- Coordinates (city): 41°09′11″S 73°25′50″W
- Country: Chile
- Region: Los Lagos Region

Government
  - Type: Municipality
  - Alcalde: Rodrigo Guarda Barrientos (Ind)

Area
  - Total: 1,278.1 km^{2} (493.5 sq mi)
- Elevation: 133 m (436 ft)

Population (2012 Census)
  - Total: 11,366
  - Density: 8.8929/km^{2} (23.032/sq mi)
  - Urban: 6,144
  - Rural: 6,660

Sex
  - Men: 6,580
  - Women: 6,224
- Time zone: UTC−4 (CLT)
  - Summer (DST): UTC−3 (CLST)
- Area code: 56 + 65
- Website: Municipality of Fresia

Fresia (Spanish pronunciation: [ˈfɾesja]) is a city and commune in Llanquihue Province, Los Lagos Region, Chile.

== Demographics ==
Historical population
Year	Pop.	±% p.a.
1875	387	—
1885	731	+6.57%
1895	1,088	+4.06%
1907	1,639	+3.47%
1920	3,659	+6.37%
1930	4,612	+2.34%
1940	12,307	+10.31%
1952	15,240	+1.80%
1970	12,546	−1.07%
1982	12,638	+0.06%
1992	13,013	+0.29%
2002	12,804	−0.16%
2017	12,261	−0.29%
2024	12,320	+0.07%
Source: "Censo de Población y Vivienda". National Statistics Institute.

According to the 2002 census of the National Statistics Institute, Fresia spans an area of 1,278.1 km^{2} (493 sq mi) and has 12,804 inhabitants (6,580 men and 6,224 women). Of these, 6,144 (48%) lived in urban areas and 6,660 (52%) in rural areas. The population fell by 1.6% (209 persons) between the 1992 and 2002 censuses.

== Climate ==
According to Köppen climate classification, Fresia have an oceanic climate (Köppen climate classification: Cfb).

== Administration ==
As a commune, Fresia is a third-level administrative division of Chile administered by a municipal council, headed by an alcalde who is directly elected every four years. The 2008-2012 alcalde is Bernardo Espinoza Villalobos (PS).

Within the electoral divisions of Chile, Fresia is represented in the Chamber of Deputies by Fidel Espinoza (PS) and Carlos Recondo (UDI) as part of the 56th electoral district, together with Puyehue, Río Negro, Purranque, Puerto Octay, Frutillar, Llanquihue, Puerto Varas and Los Muermos. The commune is represented in the Senate by Camilo Escalona Medina (PS) and Carlos Kuschel Silva (RN) as part of the 17th senatorial constituency (Los Lagos Region).
