= Los Muermos =

- City and Commune
- Location of Los Muermos commune in Los Lagos Region Location in Chile
- Coordinates (city): 41°24′S 73°29′W
- Country: Chile
- Region: Los Lagos
- Province: Llanquihue

Government
  - Type: Municipality
  - Alcalde: Emilio González Burgos (UDI)

Area
  - Total: 1,245.8 km^{2} (481.0 sq mi)
- Elevation: 149 m (489 ft)

Population (2012 Census)
  - Total: 16,132
  - Density: 12.949/km^{2} (33.538/sq mi)
  - Urban: 5,707
  - Rural: 11,257

Sex
  - Men: 8,939
  - Women: 8,025
- Time zone: UTC−4 (CLT)
  - Summer (DST): UTC−3 (CLST)
- Area code: 56 + 65
- Website: www.muermos.cl/4.1/

Los Muermos is a city and commune in Llanquihue Province, Los Lagos Region in southern Chile.

== Demographics ==
Historical population
Year	Pop.	±% p.a.
1970	14,564	—
1982	16,228	+0.91%
1992	17,054	+0.50%
2002	16,964	−0.05%
2017	17,068	+0.04%
2024	17,162	+0.08%
Source: "Censo de Población y Vivienda". National Statistics Institute.

According to the 2002 census of the National Statistics Institute, Los Muermos spans an area of 1,245.8 km^{2} (481 sq mi) and has 16,964 inhabitants (8,939 men and 8,025 women). Of these, 5,707 (33.6%) lived in urban areas and 11,257 (66.4%) in rural areas. The population fell by 0.5% (90 persons) between the 1992 and 2002 censuses.

== Climate ==
The climate in this area has mild differences between highs and lows, and there is adequate rainfall year-round. According to the Köppen Climate Classification system, Los Muermos has a marine west coast climate, abbreviated "Cfb" on climate maps.

Climate data for Los Muermos
Month	Jan	Feb	Mar	Apr	May	Jun	Jul	Aug	Sep	Oct	Nov	Dec	Year
Mean daily maximum °C (°F)	20 (68)	20 (68)	18 (64)	16 (60)	13 (56)	11 (52)	11 (51)	12 (53)	13 (56)	15 (59)	17 (62)	18 (65)	16 (60)
Mean daily minimum °C (°F)	11 (52)	11 (52)	9 (49)	8 (47)	7 (44)	6 (43)	5 (41)	5 (41)	6 (42)	7 (44)	8 (47)	10 (50)	8 (46)
Average precipitation mm (inches)	120 (4.7)	110 (4.3)	150 (6.1)	190 (7.5)	280 (10.9)	250 (9.8)	270 (10.8)	240 (9.4)	160 (6.3)	140 (5.4)	140 (5.5)	140 (5.5)	2,200 (86)
Source: Weatherbase

== Administration ==
As a commune, Los Muermos is a third-level administrative division of Chile administered by a municipal council, headed by an alcalde who is directly elected every four years. The 2008-2012 alcalde is Emilio González Burgos (UDI).

Within the electoral divisions of Chile, Los Muermos is represented in the Chamber of Deputies by Fidel Espinoza (PS) and Carlos Recondo (UDI) as part of the 56th electoral district, together with Puyehue, Río Negro, Purranque, Puerto Octay, Fresia, Frutillar, Llanquihue and Puerto Varas. The commune is represented in the Senate by Camilo Escalona Medina (PS) and Carlos Kuschel Silva (RN) as part of the 17th senatorial constituency (Los Lagos Region).
