= Purranque =

- City and Commune
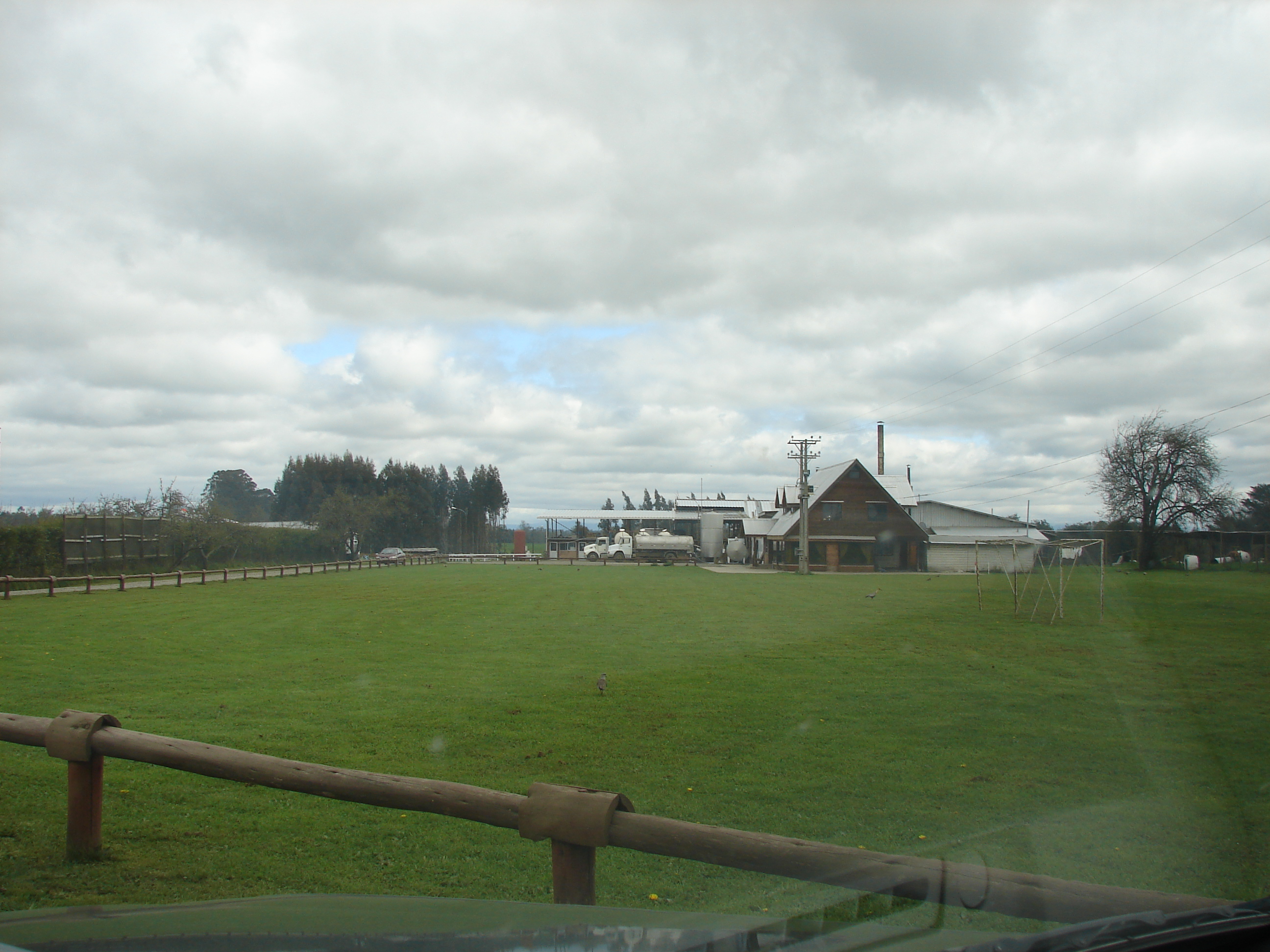

- Map of Purranque commune in Los Lagos Region Location in Chile
- Coordinates (city): 40°55′S 73°10′W
- Country: Chile
- Region: Los Lagos
- Province: Osorno
- Villa Lo Burgos de Purranquil: April 18, 1911
- Founder: Tomás Burgos

Government
  - Type: Municipality
  - Alcalde: Alicia Villar Vargas (PRCH)

Area
  - Total: 1,458.8 km^{2} (563.2 sq mi)

Population (2002 Census)
  - Total: 20,705
  - Density: 14.193/km^{2} (36.760/sq mi)
  - Urban: 13,265
  - Rural: 7,440

Sex
  - Men: 10,354
  - Women: 10,351
- Time zone: UTC−4 (CLT)
  - Summer (DST): UTC−3 (CLST)
- Area code: 56 + 64
- Climate: Cfb

Purranque is a city in the Chilean Los Lagos Region, which lies on the Pan-American Highway about 65 km (40 mi) north of Puerto Montt. It is part of the Osorno Province.

== History ==
The first ethnically identifiable inhabitants of the area were Huilliches, an indigenous people, and the land belonged to Cacique (Chief) Raylef, who was known as "Cacique Don Raylef de Purranquil"; Purranquil meaning in Mapudungun language “bush land”.

The present city was founded on April 18, 1911 as ""Villa Lo Burgos de Purranquil"", by Tomás Burgos, in a plot of land 45 km (28 mi) south of Osorno, along the railroad line between that city and Puerto Montt. On November 24, 1941 the town was elevated to the category of city by law 6402.

== Geography ==
=== Climate ===
It is classified as oceanic climate (Köppen climate classification: Cfb), on summer, the temperature reaches to 23°C, on winter, the temperature reaches to 4°C, frost are common on winter.

== Tourism ==
The city is served by Canal Bajo Carlos Hott Siebert Airport, located near Osorno, and the El Tepual International Airport, located near Puerto Montt. Purranque have the catholic feast of Saint Sebastian, each 20 January.

== Demographics ==
Historical population
Year	Pop.	±% p.a.
1875	1,429	—
1885	1,885	+2.81%
1895	3,357	+5.94%
1907	6,484	+5.64%
1920	11,985	+4.84%
1930	14,969	+2.25%
1940	14,056	−0.63%
1952	15,699	+0.93%
1970	18,735	+0.99%
1982	20,545	+0.77%
1992	20,176	−0.18%
2002	20,705	+0.26%
2017	20,369	−0.11%
2024	19,542	−0.59%
Source: "Censo de Población y Vivienda". National Statistics Institute.

According to the 2002 census of the National Statistics Institute, Purranque spans an area of 1,458.8 km^{2} (563 sq mi) and has 20,705 inhabitants (10,354 men and 10,351 women). Of these, 13,265 (64.1%) lived in urban areas and 7,440 (35.9%) in rural areas. The population grew by 2.6% (529 persons) between the 1992 and 2002 censuses.

== Administration ==
As a commune, Purranque is a third-level administrative division of Chile administered by a municipal council, headed by an alcalde who is directly elected every four years. The 2024-2028 alcalde is Alicia Villar Vargas (PRCH).

Within the electoral divisions of Chile, Purranque is represented in the Chamber of Deputies by Hector Barria Angulo (PDC), Harry Jurgensen (IND), Daniel Lilayu (UDI) and Emilia Nuyado (PS) as part of the 25th electoral district, together with Puyehue, Río Negro, Puerto Octay, Fresia, Frutillar, Llanquihue, Puerto Varas and Los Muermos. The commune is represented in the Senate by Fidel Espinoza Sandoval (PS), Ivan MoreiraB Barros (UDI) (and Carlos Kuschel Silva (RN) as part of the 13th senatorial constituency (Los Lagos Region).

== Education ==
-Liceo Tomás Burgos. (Public). -Escuela Villa Lo Burgos. (Public). -Escuela Crecer. (Public). -Escuela Purranque.(Public). -Dharma College. -Colegio Inglés. -Colegio Génesis. -Colegio Preciosa Sangre (Catholic school). -Instituto Alemán (Deutsche Schule Purranque).

-Rural schools: Escuela La Paz Crucero, Escuela Nueva Israel Hueyusca, Escuela Antonio Fernández Coligual, Escuela Concordia, Escuela San Pedro, Escuela Manquemapu, Escuela Oromo.

== See also ==
- Osorno Volcano
- Osorno Province
- Tomás Burgos
- Héctor Mancilla
