= San Pablo, Chile =

San Pablo
- Town and Commune
- Location of the San Pablo commune in Los Lagos Region Location in Chile
- Coordinates (town): 40°24′S 73°01′W
- Country: Chile
- Region: Los Lagos
- Province: Osorno

Government
  - Type: Municipality
  - Alcalde: Omar Alvarado Agüero (DC)

Area
  - Total: 637.3 km^{2} (246.1 sq mi)

Population (2002 Census)
  - Total: 10,162
  - Density: 15.95/km^{2} (41.30/sq mi)
  - Urban: 3,478
  - Rural: 6,684

Sex
  - Men: 5,210
  - Women: 4,952
- Time zone: UTC-4 (Chile Time (CLT))
  - Summer (DST): UTC-3 (Chile Summer Time (CLST))
- Area code: 56 +
- Climate: Cfb
- Website: www.sanpablo.cl

San Pablo is a Chilean town and commune located in the Osorno Province in the Los Lagos Region. It is located 27 km from the city and provincial capital of Osorno. The commune is mostly rural. Its activity is almost entirely agricultural and ranching. In the commune also performs Agritourism.

== History ==
San Pablo was in the Department of Osorno and administratively dependent of the Municipality of Osorno. On 22 December 1891, the Municipal Building decree establishing the City of San Pablo, based in San Pablo, whose territory corresponded to the subdelegations 8a, 9a, 10a, 11a and 12a of the Department of Osorno. The first mayor of San Pablo was Guillermo Heufemann.

== Demographics ==
Historical population
Year	Pop.	±% p.a.
1875	6,025	—
1885	7,928	+2.78%
1895	9,778	+2.12%
1907	8,736	−0.93%
1920	8,256	−0.43%
1930	8,055	−0.25%
1940	8,550	+0.60%
1952	7,893	−0.66%
1970	11,173	+1.95%
1982	11,308	+0.10%
1992	11,178	−0.12%
2002	10,162	−0.95%
2017	10,030	−0.09%
2024	10,883	+1.17%
Source: "Censo de Población y Vivienda". National Statistics Institute.

According to the 2002 census of the National Statistics Institute, San Pablo spans an area of 637.3 km^{2} (246 sq mi) and has 10,162 inhabitants (5,210 men and 4,952 women). Of these, 3,478 (34.2%) lived in urban areas and 6,684 (65.8%) in rural areas. The population fell by 9.1% (1016 persons) between the 1992 and 2002 censuses.

== Administration ==
As a commune, San Pablo is a third-level administrative division of Chile administered by a municipal council, headed by an alcalde who is directly elected every four years. The 2008-2012 alcalde is Omar Alvarado.

Within the electoral divisions of Chile, San Pablo is represented in the Chamber of Deputies by Javier Hernández (UDI) and Sergio Ojeda (PDC) as part of the 55th electoral district, together with Osorno and San Juan de la Costa. The commune is represented in the Senate by Camilo Escalona Medina (PS) and Carlos Kuschel Silva (RN) as part of the 17th senatorial constituency (Los Lagos Region).
