= Llanquihue, Chile =

Llanquihue
- City and Commune
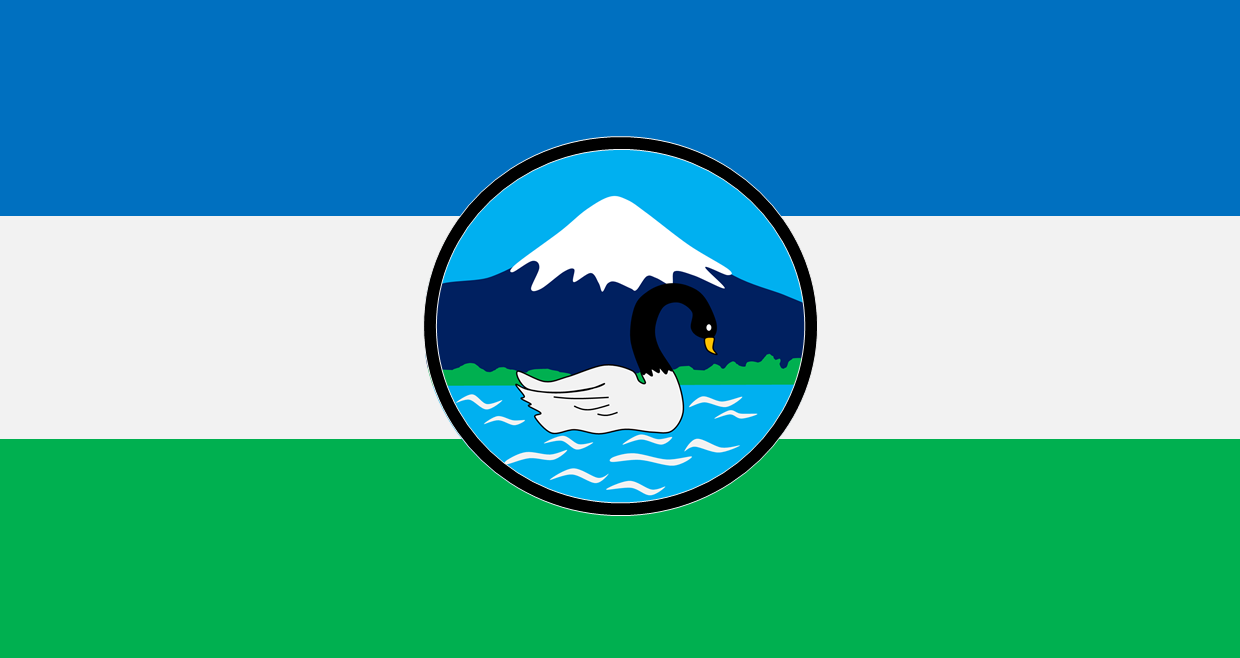
- Flag Commune of Llanquihue in the Los Lagos Region Location in Chile
- Coordinates (city): 41°15′29″S 73°0′31″W
- Country: Chile
- Region: Los Lagos Region
- Province: Llanquihue Province

Government
  - Type: Municipality
  - Alcalde: Victor Angulo Muñoz (Ind.)

Area
  - Total: 420.8 km^{2} (162.5 sq mi)
- Elevation: 55 m (180 ft)

Population (2012 Census)
  - Total: 16,249
  - Density: 38.61/km^{2} (100.0/sq mi)
  - Urban: 12,728
  - Rural: 3,609

Sex
  - Men: 8,141
  - Women: 8,196
- Time zone: UTC−4 (CLT)
  - Summer (DST): UTC−3 (CLST)
- Area code: 56 + 65
- Climate: Cfb
- Website: Municipality of Llanquihue

Llanquihue (Spanish: [ʎaŋˈkiwe]) is a Chilean commune and city in Llanquihue Province, Los Lagos Region. The city lies on the western shore of Lake Llanquihue, where the Maullín River starts. It is located 7 kilometres (4.3 mi) north of Puerto Varas and 19 kilometres (12 mi) south of Frutillar and is connected to both cities by Chile Highway 5.

== History ==
On 19 June 1968, the government promulgated the law creating the Commune of Llanquihue. The National Congress approved the bill, which in its first article states: Commune Llanquihue Puerto Varas, Llanquihue Province, the capital is the town of Llanquihue.

A dialect of German, Lagunen-deutsch is spoken by the people of this commune.

== Demographics ==
Historical population
Year	Pop.	±% p.a.
1970	12,972	—
1982	13,466	+0.31%
1992	14,386	+0.66%
2002	16,337	+1.28%
2017	17,591	+0.49%
2024	18,088	+0.40%
Source: "Censo de Población y Vivienda". National Statistics Institute.

According to the 2002 census of the National Statistics Institute, Llanquihue spans an area of 420.8 km^{2} (162 sq mi) and has 16,337 inhabitants (8,141 men and 8,196 women). Of these, 12,728 (77.9%) lived in urban areas and 3,609 (22.1%) in rural areas. The population grew by 13.6% (1,951 persons) between the 1992 and 2002 censuses.

== Administration ==
As a commune, Llanquihue is a third-level administrative division of Chile administered by a municipal council, headed by an alcalde who is directly elected every four years. The 2021–2024 alcalde is Victor Angulo Muñoz (Ind.).

Within the electoral divisions of Chile, Llanquihue is represented in the Chamber of Deputies by Fidel Espinoza (PS) and Carlos Recondo (UDI) as part of the 56th electoral district, together with Puyehue, Río Negro, Purranque, Puerto Octay, Fresia, Frutillar, Puerto Varas and Los Muermos. The commune is represented in the Senate by Camilo Escalona Medina (PS) and Carlos Kuschel Silva (RN) as part of the 17th senatorial constituency (Los Lagos Region).

== Education ==
Previously the area had a German school, Deutsche Schule Llanquihue.
