= Los Lagos Region =

Region of Chile

Los Lagos Region Región de Los Lagos
- Region of Chile
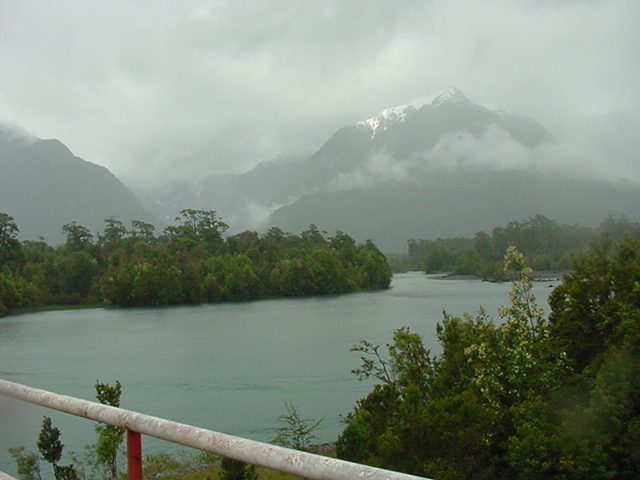
- Corcovado National Park

- Flag Seal Coat of arms

- Map of Los Lagos Region
- Coordinates: 41°28′18″S 72°56′12″W
- Country: Chile
- Capital: Puerto Montt
- Provinces: Osorno, Llanquihue, Chiloé, Palena

Government
  - Governor: Alejandro Santana (RN)
  - Presidential delegate: Cristián Palma (REP)

Area
  - Total: 48,583.6 km^{2} (18,758.2 sq mi)
  - Rank: 5
- Highest elevation: 2,450 m (8,040 ft)
- Lowest elevation: 0 m (0 ft)

Population (2024 census)
  - Total: 890,284
  - Rank: 7
  - Density: 18.3248/km^{2} (47.4610/sq mi)

GDP (PPP)
  - Total: $11.131 billion (2014)
  - Per capita: $12,335 (2014)
- ISO 3166 code: CL-LL
- HDI (2022): 0.803 high
- Website: Official website (in Spanish)

Los Lagos Region (Spanish: Región de Los Lagos pronounced [los ˈlaɣos], lit. 'Region of the Lakes') is one of Chile's 16 regions, which are first order administrative divisions, and comprises four provinces: Chiloé, Llanquihue, Osorno and Palena. The region contains the country's second-largest island, Chiloé, and the second-largest lake, Llanquihue. Its capital is Puerto Montt; other important cities include Osorno, Castro, Ancud, and Puerto Varas. Los Lagos Region is considered part of Patagonia.

Historically, the Huilliche have called this territory between Bueno River and Reloncaví Sound Futahuillimapu, meaning "great land of the south". The region hosts Monte Verde, one of the oldest archaeological sites of the Americas. The largest indigenous group of the region are the Huilliche who lived in the area before the arrival of the Spanish. The Spanish crown settled Chiloé Archipelago in 1567 while the rest of the region begun to be slowly colonized by non-indigenous people only in the late 18th century. In the 1850s, Germans arrived to colonize the shores of Llanquihue Lake under a Chilean state-sponsored program.

Los Lagos Region economy is dominated by the service sector but based in fishing, salmon aquaculture, forestry and cattle farming. Tourism is economically important in The Andes where ski resorts, hot springs and recreational fishing are popular offers.

== History ==
The territory between Valdivia and Puerto Montt was already described in CORFO’s Geografía Económica de Chile (1950) as one of six regions defined according to geographic, demographic, and economic criteria. These regions were used solely for planning purposes and for the organization of ODEPLAN, and were later formalized by Decree No. 1104 of 1969.

The regionalization process promoted by the military dictatorship created the “X Region” in 1974, comprising the former provinces of Valdivia, Osorno, Llanquihue, and Chiloé.

As regionalization was implemented gradually, the administrative regime of the new region only began operating on 1 January 1976, when Air Force Brigadier General Juan Soler Manfredini—until then intendant of the former province of Llanquihue—assumed office as the first regional intendant.

In 1978, it received the official name “X Región de Los Lagos,” and in 1979 the province of Palena was created, made up of Chaitén, Futaleufú, Palena, and the Desertores Islands which until then had belonged to the province of Chiloé, as well as the newly created commune of Hualaihué, whose territory had previously been part of the province of Llanquihue.

The most significant change, however, occurred on 2 October 2007, with the separation of the province of Valdivia, which became the Region of Los Ríos.

In 2018, the numerical designation of the regions was abolished, and since then its official name has been “Región de Los Lagos”.

== Geography ==
The region is bordered on the north by Los Ríos Region, on the south by Aisén Region, on the west by the Pacific Ocean and on the east by Argentina (provinces of Neuquén, Río Negro and Chubut). Wild environments can be seen along the coastal area, such as Caleta Zorra.

=== Demography ===
The region has an area of 48,585 km^{2} (18,759 sq mi) and its population, according to the 2024 INE Census was 890,284, with a population density of 18.32/km².

=== Principal towns ===
No.	Town	Population	Province
1.	Puerto Montt	277,040	Llanquihue
2.	Osorno	166,455	Osorno
3.	Puerto Varas	52,942	Llanquihue
4.	Castro	46,997	Chiloé
5.	Ancud	40,949	Chiloé
6.	Calbuco	36,474	Llanquihue
7.	Quellón	28,460	Chiloé
8.	Frutillar	22,554	Llanquihue
9.	Purranque	19,542	Osorno
10.	Llanquihue	18,088	Llanquihue
11.	Los Muermos	17,162	Llanquihue
12.	Chonchi	16,078	Chiloé
13.	Maullín	15,063	Llanquihue
14.	Dalcahue	14,894	Chiloé
15.	Río Negro	13,874	Osorno
16.	Fresia	12,320	Llanquihue
17.	Puyehue	11,712	Osorno
18.	San Pablo	10,883	Osorno

=== Climate ===
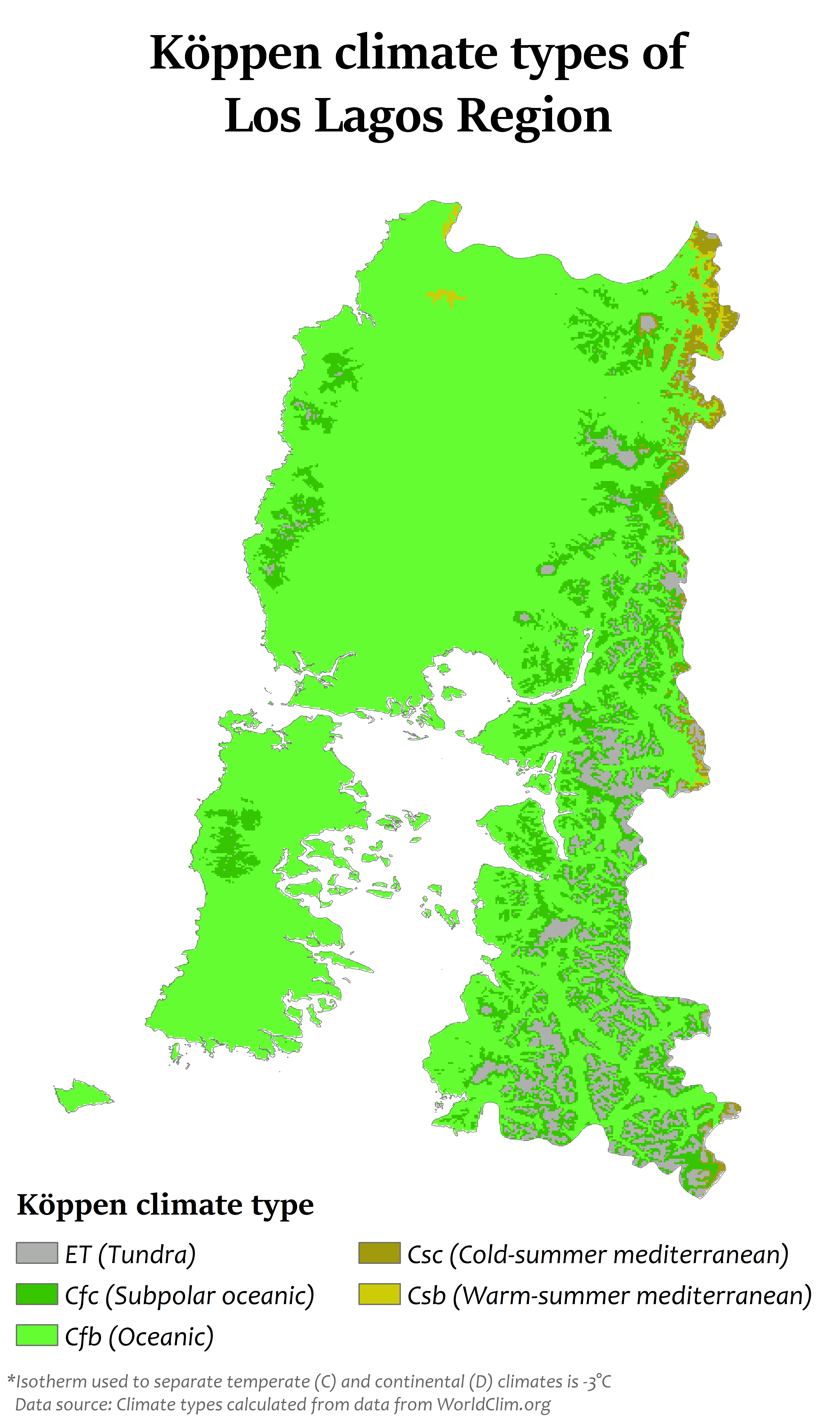
Köppen climate types in Los Lagos Region

The region, in general, has a natural vegetation of Valdivian temperate rain forest. The coastal part, except for the south of the Chiloé Island, has a temperate climate with cold winter rain. To the south, the climate is characterized by constant rain and not having dry seasons.

=== Protected areas ===
Protected areas include 7 national parks, 2 private-owned parks and 2 natural monuments.

National Parks

- Alerce Andino
- Chiloé
- Corcovado
- Hornopirén
- Pumalín
- Puyehue
- Vicente Pérez Rosales

Private parks

- Tantauco Park
- Las Vertientes – Reserva Natural Privada

Natural monuments

- Islotes de Puñihuil
- Lahuen Ñadi

== Economy ==
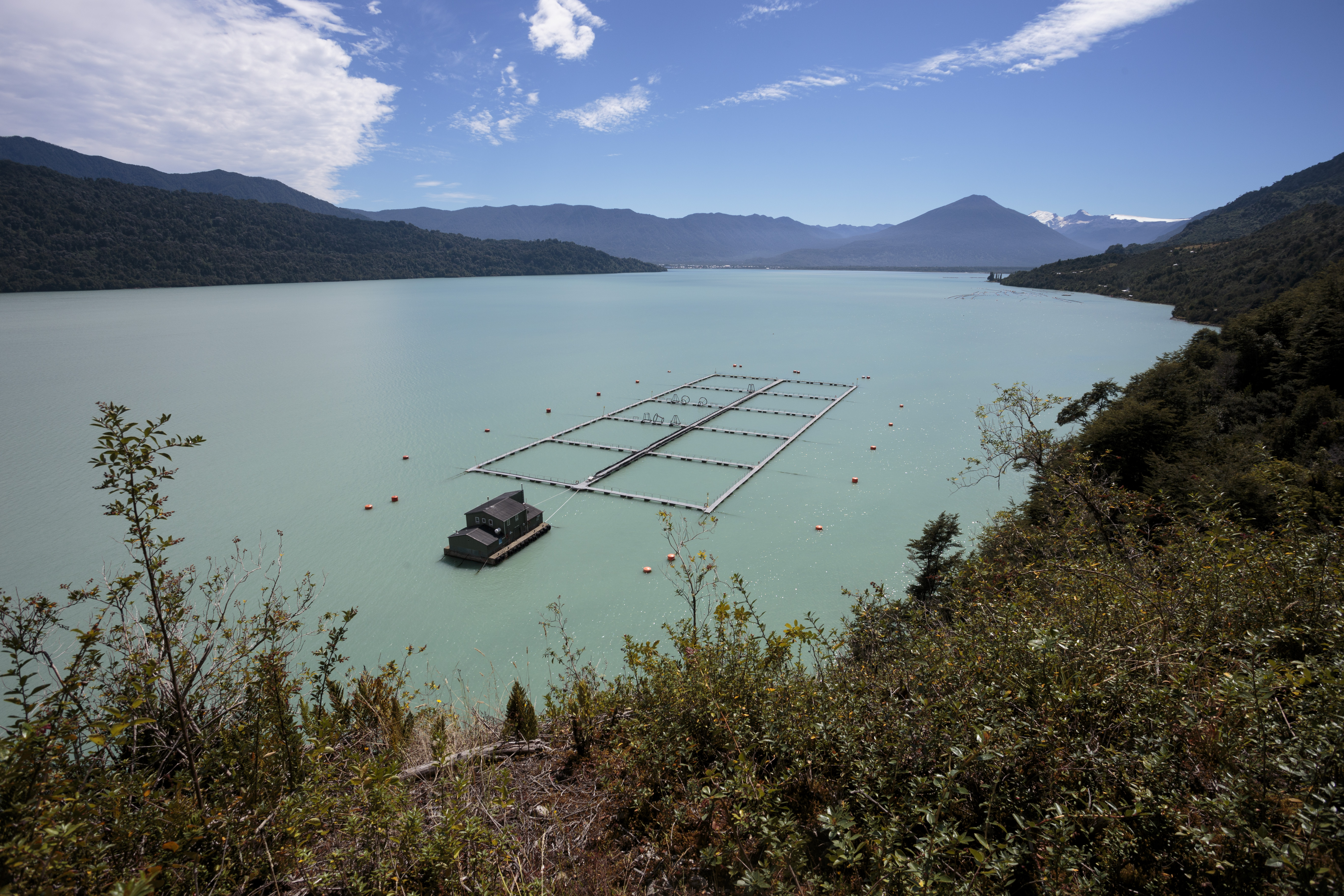
Salmon farming center in the Hornopirén Channel, Hualaihué.

The regional economy is concentrated in agricultural and livestock activities, forestry, aquaculture, and tourism.

=== Aquaculture and fishing ===
The Los Lagos Region is by far Chile’s main aquaculture production area. In 2024, 958,507 tonnes of resources were harvested from aquaculture centers, equivalent to 65.4% of the national total.

Salmon farming is the region’s main aquaculture activity and also its principal economic activity, accounting for 78.1% of the total value of regional exports. It is developed mainly between Puerto Montt and Quellón, but is present in all provinces. The regional capital is the core of the industry, serving as the operational base for the most important producing companies. In 2019, salmon and trout exports reached US$5.135 billion, making them the country’s leading non-mineral export product that year.

Mussel farming is also an important economic activity. Unlike salmon farming which has a strong presence in Aysén and Magallanes, the national mussel-farming industry is developed almost entirely within this region, mainly in Chiloé. Chile is the world’s leading exporter of this product, and in 2023 sales reached US$289.5 million. In 2019, the sector achieved a production of 332,000 tonnes.

Seaweed cultivation is likewise largely concentrated in the region. Pelillo (Gracilaria chilensis) being the main resource with 77.1% (9,744 tonnes) of the national total harvested there in 2024.

The region also has the largest number of artisanal fishers in Chile: 11,104 in 2024, according to fisheries authority figures, representing 18.45% of the national total. Likewise, 40% of Chile’s 467 fishing coves are located in the region, 189 in total, of which 93 are in Chiloé.

In the 2024 annual landings of Chile’s artisanal sector, the region accounted for 9.2% (126,412 tonnes), with pelillo, luga negra (Sarcothalia crispata), and huiro—all seaweeds—being the main locally extracted resources. Other species of importance to Los Lagos fishers include clams, mussels (cholga), loco (Chilean abalone), southern sardine, southern hake, oysters, reineta, and sea urchin.

=== Agriculture and livestock ===
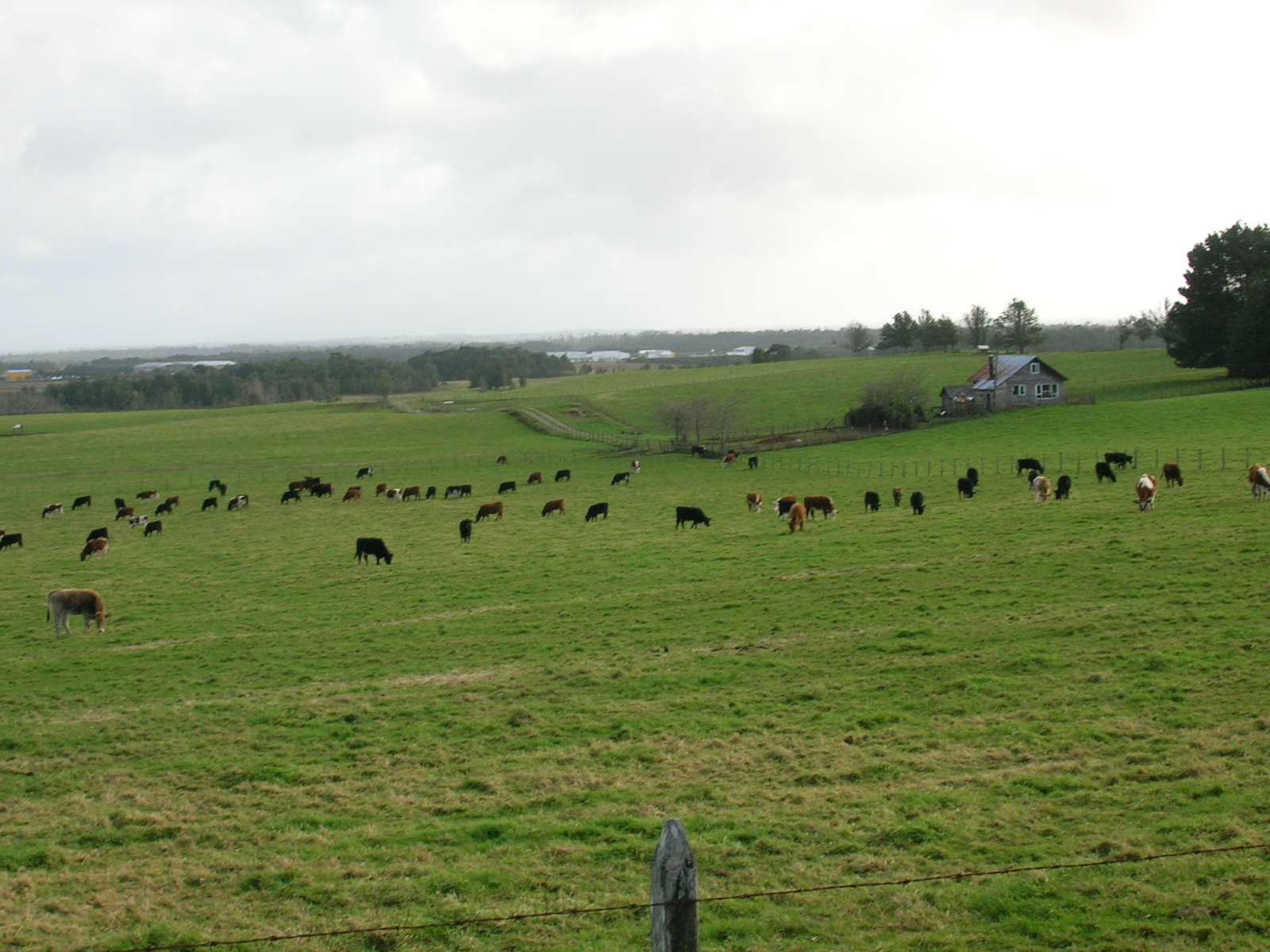
Agricultural and livestock activity in Los Lagos is among the most developed in the country

During the 2022/2023 period, the Los Lagos Region was the country’s leading potato producer, with 264,481 tonnes, representing 31% of national production, followed by La Araucanía with 253,051 tonnes (30%).

Cattle production is also of great importance. In 2019, out of a national total of 3,108,089 head of cattle, 1,215,221 were in the Los Lagos Region, representing 39% of the country’s cattle stock.

In 2017, beef production reached 54,493 tonnes, equivalent to 27.3% of the national total.

Dairy production in the region is highly developed, especially in the province of Osorno. Among the most important processing plants are those of Nestlé (Cancura and Llanquihue), Prolesur (Osorno), and Watt’s (Osorno). In 2020, these four plants accounted for 30.5% of Chile’s total milk reception and production.

=== Tourism ===
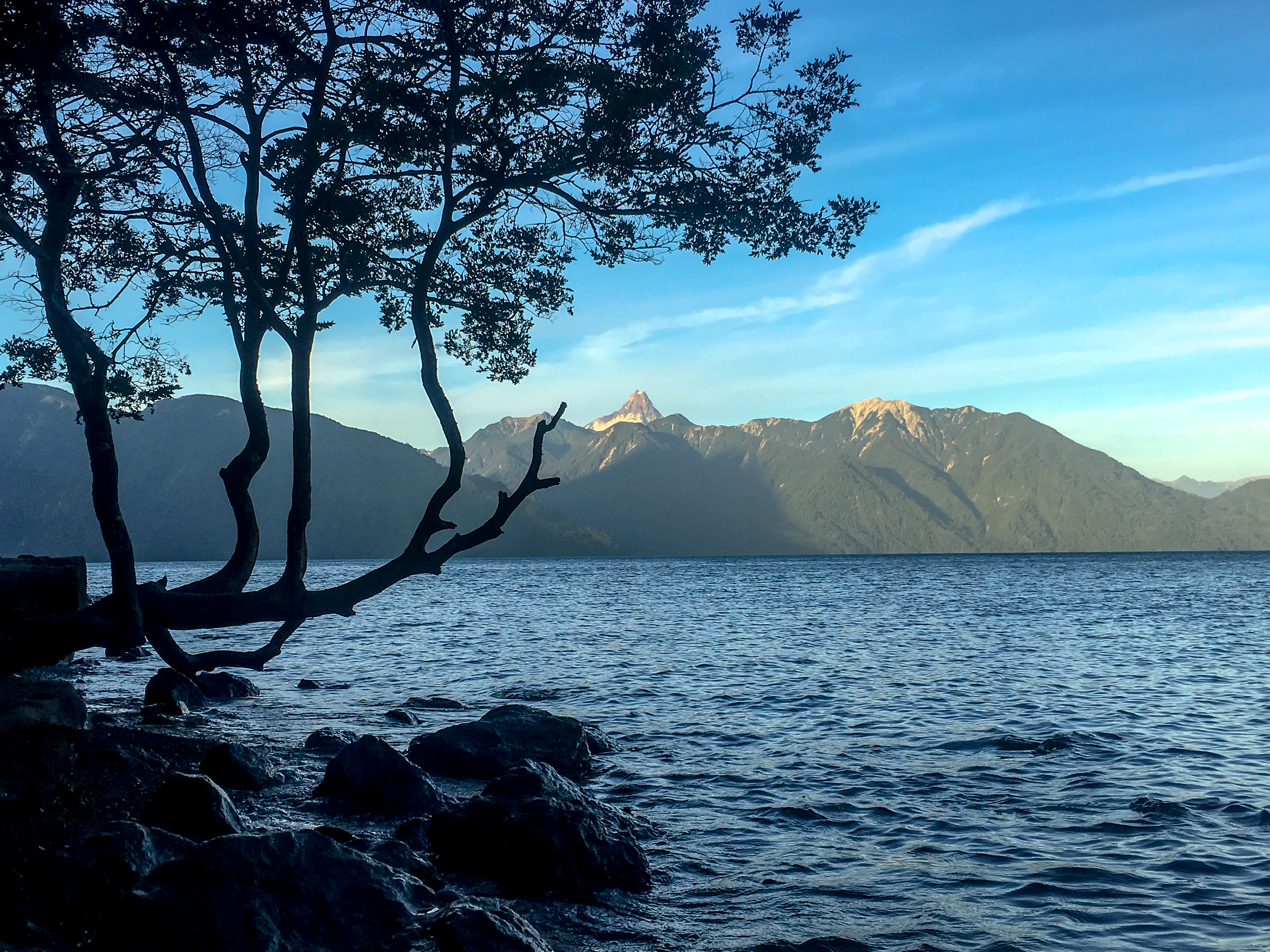
Todos los Santos Lake, Vicente Pérez Rosales National Park

Tourism also plays a major role, as the region is one of the most visited in Chile. In 2022, it ranked eighth nationwide in number of visitors, with 2,415,359 overnight stays (6.3% of the national total). The most popular destinations were the Llanquihue Lake–Todos los Santos Lake area, the Chiloé Archipelago, Costa Patagonia, followed by the Osorno–Puyehue corridor and the Carretera Austral.

Likewise, in 2019, Vicente Pérez Rosales National Park was the most visited protected area in its category, while the Los Lagos Region ranked first nationwide in total visits to protected wilderness areas, followed by Los Flamencos National Reserve in the Antofagasta Region.

The importance of tourism is reflected in the fact that in 2018 there were more than 1,100 tourism establishments in the region, generating over 17,400 jobs in accommodation and food services, equivalent to 4.1% of total regional employment.

=== Other activities ===
Other notable activities include the maritime industry (shipyards and shipping companies) and forestry exploitation.

The region is also home to the Canutillar hydroelectric plant, which uses the waters of Lake Chapo east of Puerto Montt, and the Pilmaiquén plant in the commune of Puyehue.

== Transportation ==
El Tepual Airport lies a few miles west of Puerto Montt and Cañal Bajo Carlos Hott Siebert Airport a few miles east of Osorno. Also east of Osorno, the Cardenal Antonio Samoré Pass is a major mountain pass across the Andes to Argentina via Route 215.

== See also ==
- German colonization of Valdivia, Osorno and Llanquihue
- Antillanca ski resort
- Intermediate Depression
- Patagonia
