= Manuel Fuentes =

Chilean rodeo rider (1940–2025)

Personal information
- Full name: Manuel Antonio Fuentes Alarcón
- Nickname: Farolito
- Born: June 16, 1940 El Manzano, Chile
- Died: June 11, 2025 (aged 84) Pichidegua, Chile

Sport
- Sport: Rodeo

Manuel Antonio Fuentes Alarcón (April 16, 1940 – June 11, 2025) was a Chilean rider in the rodeo, two-time Chilean champion. Accompanied by Ramón Cardemil, he was champion of Chile in the 1973 and 1981 championships. Nicknamed "Farolito", he is considered one of the best riders in the history of Chilean rodeo.

== Biography ==
Fuentes began as an employee of Hugo Cardemil, with whom he raced for many years. He was later loaned to the Santa Elba corral to race with Ramón Cardemil, Hugo's brother.

He raced with his partner Cardemil for eleven years, and also alongside prominent jockeys, retiring from the sport at an advanced age. During his career, he admired Ruperto Valderrama, whom he considered "The Pelé of the croissants." During his life, he received several awards, such as the Sports Career Award presented by the rodeo federation during the 2025 National Rodeo Championship.

After leaving the Santa Elba stud, he went to Talca and rode for the Don Ignacio stud with José Díaz. He then went to Tomás García's Casas de El Milagro and also Alejandro Tornero's El Chubasco.

In August 2021, he was considered a Master Setter of the Huasa Equestrian School, in accordance with the regulations published by the National Sports Federation of Chilean Rodeo.

In 2025, he was awarded the Lifetime Achievement Award. He died on June 11, 2025, just a few days shy of his 85th birthday, and was honored by many Chilean huasos. The religious ceremony took place at the La Torina church in Pichidegua, with Alfredo Moreno Echeverría, president of the Chilean Rodeo Federation, in attendance; and Alberto Cardemil, one of the owners of the Santa Elba Breeding Farm, where Fuentes won both titles alongside Ramón Cardemil. Members of the Cardenal Caro Rodeo Association and the Pichidegua Club, to which he belonged, also attended.

== National championships ==
Year	Team	Horses	Score	Association
1973	Ramón Cardemil	"Tabacón" and "Trampero"	22	Curicó
1981	Ramón Cardemil	"Bellaco" and "Rival"	22	Curicó

=== Second championships ===
- 1980: with Ramón Cardemil, riding "Bellaco" and "Rival" with 21 points.
- 1987: with Patricio Fresno, riding "Tranquilo" and "Campero" with 21 points.

=== Third championships ===
- 1973: with Ramón Cardemil, riding "Burlesca" and "Princesa" with 20 points.
- 1977: with Ramón Cardemil, riding "Bellaco" and "Rival" with 22 points.
- 1980: along with Ramón Cardemil, riding "Mensajero" and "Refuerzo" with 20 points.
