= Campeonato Nacional de Rodeo =

Rodeo competition in Chile

The National Championship of Chilean Rodeo (Campeonato Nacional de Rodeo chileno) is the highest-level rodeo competition in Chile.

- Place: Medialuna de Rancagua
- City: Rancagua
- Riders with more titles: Juan Carlos Loaiza (9 titles), Ramón Cardemil (7 titles), Eduardo Tamayo (7 titles).

== National champions of Chile ==
Year	City	Rider 1	Rider 2	Horse 1	Horse 2	Points	Association
1949	Rancagua	Ernesto Santos	José Gutiérrez	Vanidosa	Bototo	15	Temuco
1950	San Fernando	Roberto Palacios	Jesús Bustamante	Caduca	Satín	16	San Clemente
1951	Rancagua	Manuel Bustamante	Antonio Ríos	Prestigio	Pichanguero	21	Hospital
1952	Chillán	René Urzúa	Francisco Jara	Jovencita	Algún Día	14	Chépica
1953	Curicó	René Urzúa	Pedro Lorca	Secretaria	Picantita	16	Chépica
1954	Los Andes	Alberto Montt	Mario Molina	Perro	Estropajo	21	Rengo
1955	Melipilla	Santiago Urrutia	Atiliano Urrutia	Marmota	Mentita	20	Parral
1956	Chillán	Abelino Mora	Eliseo Calderón	Cervecero	Latosito	18	Temuco
1957	Curicó	René Urzúa	Luis Mayol	Cuspe	Reñoso	15	Chimbarongo
1958	Osorno	Alejandro Hott	Julio Hott	Huilcoco	Felizcote	16	Río Bueno
1959	Melipilla	Eduardo Siebet	Raúl González	Ña Popa	Balita	20	Osorno
1960	Maipú	Rodolfo Bustos	Segudo Zúñiga	Por si Acaso	Broche	13	San Carlos
1961	Maipú	Abelino Mora	Miguel Lamoaliatte	Aceitaíta	Pluma	17	Temuco
1962	Los Ángeles	Ramón Cardemil	Ruperto Valderrama	Manicero	Matucho	19	Curicó
1963	Linares	Ramón Cardemil	Ruperto Valderrama	Envidia	Venganza	18	Curicó
1964	Ovalle	José Manuel Aguirre	Guillermo Aguirre	Ñipán	Reparo	16	Los Ángeles
1965	San Fernando	Ramón Cardemil	Ruperto Valderrama	Manicero	Matucho	22	Curicó
1966	Valdivia	Abelino Mora	Miguel Lamoliatte	Aceitata	Flecha	24	Temuco
1967	Rancagua	Ramón Cardemil	Ruperto Valderrama	Percala	Pelotera	24	Curicó
1968	Rancagua	Ramón Cardemil	Ruperto Valderrama	Manicero	Trampero	29	Curicó
1969	Talca	Santiago Urrutia	Samuel Parot	Barranco	Huachipato	27	Parral
1970	Osorno	Pablo Quera	Raúl Cáceres	Chinganero	Barquillo	25	Curicó
1971	Talca	Carlos Gaedicke	Arno Gaedicke	Manojo	Mala Cara	21	Puerto Octay
1972	Rancagua	Ricardo de la Fuente	Ubaldo García	Risueña	Borrachita	17	Osorno
1973	Rancagua	Ramón Cardemil	Manuel Fuentes	Tabacón	Trampero	22	Curicó
1974	Talca	Sergio Bustamante	Jesús Bustamante	Forastero	Carretera	25	Graneros
1975	Rancagua	Pablo Quera	Raúl Cáceres	Tranquila	Malagueña	20	Curicó
1976	Rancagua	Ramón Gonzalez	Pedro Vergara	Placer	Angamos	26	Rancagua
1977	Rancagua	Samuel Parot	Eduardo Tamayo	Guariqueque	Desiderio	27	Osorno
1978	Rancagua	Luis Domínguez	Alberto Schwalm	Vistazo	Estribillo	25	Osorno
1979	Rancagua	Ricardo de la Fuente	Julio Buschman	Agora Qué	Rastrojo	22	Osorno
1980	Rancagua	Ricardo de la Fuente	Enrique Schwalm	Vespertino	Estribillo	22	Osorno
1981	Rancagua	Ramón Cardemil	Manuel Fuentes	Bellaco	Rival	22	Curicó
1982	Rancagua	René Guzmán	Boris Guzmán	Taponazo	Enzarte	21	Mulchén
1983	Rancagua	Leonardo García	Daniel Rey	Alborada	Ronquerita	23	Temuco
1984	Rancagua	Felipe Jiménez	Hugo Navarro	Vanidoso	Auquincano	26	Chillán
1985	Rancagua	Hernán Cardemil	Juan Pablo Cardemil	Rumana	Atinada	25	Curicó
1986	Rancagua	Hugo Cardemil	Guillermo Barra	Salteador III	Pensamiento	23	Curicó
1987	Rancagua	Juan Carlos Loaiza	Carlos Mondaca	Papayero	Rico Raco	22	Valdivia
1988	Rancagua	Juan Carlos Loaiza	Carlos Mondaca	Papayero	Rico Raco	35	Valdivia
1989	Rancagua	Jesús Bustamante	Vicente Yañez	Estribillo II	Consejero	34	Rancagua
1990	Rancagua	Hugo Cardemil	José Astaburuaga	Lechón	Reservado	31	Curicó
1991	Rancagua	Hugo Cardemil	José Astaburuaga	Esquinazo	Reservado	31	Curicó
1992	Rancagua	Jesús Bustamante	Vicente Yañez	Esparramo	Corsario	37	Rancagua
1993	Rancagua	Hugo Cardemil	José Astaburuaga	Esquinazo	Reservado	36	Curicó
1994	Rancagua	Juan Carlos Loaiza	Eduardo Tamayo	Esbelta	Escandaloza	35	Valdivia
1995	Rancagua	René Guzmán	José Manuel Rey	Pretal	Canteado	40	Melipilla
1996	Rancagua	René Guzmán	José Manuel Rey	Pretal	Canteado	31	Bío-Bío
1997	Rancagua	Alejandro Alvariño	Héctor Navarro	Amuleto	Morenita	33	Osorno
1998	Rancagua	José Manuel Pozo	Alejandro Pozo	Campo II	Peumo	35	Talca
1999	Rancagua	Mario Valencia	Cristián Ramírez	Bochinchero	Huachaco	39	Valparaíso
2000	Rancagua	Juan Carlos Loaiza	Eduardo Tamayo	Escorpión	Talento	40	Valdivia
2001	Rancagua	Juan Carlos Loaiza	Luis Eduardo Cortés	Banquero	Batuco	41	Valdivia
2002	Rancagua	Juan Carlos Loaiza	Eduardo Tamayo	Talento	Almendra	36	Valdivia
2003	Rancagua	Sebastián Walker	Camilo Padilla	Lucero	Destape	41	Valdivia
2004	Rancagua	Gabriel Orphanopoulos	Mariano Torres	Ahí No Mas	Guapetón	34	Linares
2005	Rancagua	Claudio Hernández	Rufino Hernández	Morenita	Inventada	38	Talca
2006	Rancagua	Claudio Hernández	Rufino Hernández	Malulo	Estruendo	48	Bío-Bío
2007	Rancagua	Juan Carlos Loaiza	Eduardo Tamayo	Talento	Fiestera	38	Valdivia
2008	Rancagua	Jesús Rodríguez	Christian Pooley	Rangoso	Canalla	37	Cautín
2009	Rancagua	Emiliano Ruiz	José Meza	Distinguido	Espinudo	39	Cordillera
2010	Rancagua	Cristóbal Cortina	Víctor Vergara	Cumpa	Tio Pedro	36	Cordillera
2011	Rancagua	Germán Varela	Pedro Vergara	Fogoso	Puntilla	35	O'Higgins
2012	Rancagua	Juan Carlos Loaiza	Eduardo Tamayo	Cantora	Alabanza	37	Valdivia
2013	Rancagua	Gustavo Valdebenito	Luis Corvalán	Compadre	Quiltralco	36	Malleco
2014	Rancagua	Juan Carlos Loaiza	Eduardo Tamayo	Dulzura	Delicada	38	Valdivia
2015	Rancagua	Luis Ignacio Urrutia	Juan Ignacio Meza	Arremángamelo	Preferido	37	Santiago
2016	Rancagua	José Tomás Meza	José Manuel Pozo	Disturbio	Perno	41	Santiago and Talca
2017	Rancagua	Juan Antonio Rehbein	Bruno Rehbein	Buen Tipo	Onofre	40	Llanquihue and Palena
2018	Rancagua	Gustavo Valdebenito	Cristóbal Cortina	Compadre	Caballero	37	Malleco
2019	Rancagua	Alfredo L. Díaz	Pablo Aninat	Peumo Marcado	Doña Inés	40	Santiago Oriente

== Statistics ==
=== Championships for riders ===
- 9:
  - Juan Carlos Loaiza (1987, 1988, 1994, 2000, 2001, 2002, 2007, 2012, 2014)
- 7:
  - Ramón Cardemil (1962, 1963, 1965, 1967, 1968, 1973, 1981)
  - Eduardo Tamayo (1977, 1994, 2000, 2002, 2007, 2012. 2014)
- 5:
  - Ruperto Valderrama (1962, 1963, 1965, 1967, 1968)
- 4:
  - Hugo Cardemil (1986, 1990, 1991, 1993)
- 3:
  - René Urzúa (1952, 1953, 1957)
  - Abelino Mora (1956, 1961, 1966)
  - Ricardo de la Fuente (1972, 1979, 1980)
  - Jesús Bustamante (1974, 1989, 1992)
  - René Guzmán (1982, 1995, 1996)
  - José Astaburuaga (1990, 1991, 1993)
- 2:
  - Santiago Urrutia (1955, 1969)
  - Miguel Lamoliatte (1961, 1966)
  - Samuel Parot (1969, 1977)
  - Pablo Quera (1970, 1975)
  - Raúl Cáceres (1970, 1975)
  - Manuel Fuentes (1973, 1981)
  - Carlos Mondaca (1987, 1988)
  - Vicente Yañez (1989, 1992)
  - José Manuel Rey (1995, 1996)
  - Claudio Hernández (2005, 2006)
  - Rufino Hernández (2005, 2006)
  - José Manuel Pozo (1998, 2016)
  - José Tomás Meza (2009, 2016)
  - Gustavo Valdebenito (2013, 2018)
  - Cristóbal Cortina (2010, 2018)

=== Championships associations ===
- Curicó 14 (1962, 1963, 1965, 1967, 1968, 1970, 1973, 1975, 1981, 1985, 1986, 1990, 1991, 1993)
- Valdivia 10 (1987, 1988, 1994, 2000, 2001, 2002, 2003, 2007, 2012, 2014)
- Osorno 7 (1959, 1972, 1977, 1978, 1979, 1980, 1997)
- Temuco 5 (1949, 1956, 1961, 1966, 1983)
- Rancagua 4 (1976, 1989, 1992, 2011)
- Talca 3 (1998, 2005, 2016)
- Parral 2 (1955, 1969)
- Chépica 2 (1952, 1953)
- Bío-Bío 2 (1996, 2006)
- Cordillera 2 (2009, 2010)
- Santiago 2 (2015, 2016)
- Malleco 2 (2018)
- San Clemente 1 (1950)
- Hospital 1 (1951)
- Rengo 1 (1954)
- Chimbarongo 1 (1957)
- Río Bueno 1 (1958)
- San Carlos 1 (1960)
- Los Ángeles 1 (1964)
- Puerto Octay 1 (1971)
- Graneros 1 (1974)
- Mulchén 1 (1982)
- Chillán 1 (1984)
- Melipilla 1 (1995)
- Valparaíso 1 (1999)
- Linares 1 (2004)
- Cautín 1 (2008)
- O'Higgins 1 (2011)
- Llanquihue and Palena 1 (2017)

=== Horse championships ===
- Reservado (1990, 1991, 1993)
- Manicero (1962, 1965, 1968)
- Talento (2000, 2002, 2007)
- Aceitata (1961, 1966)
- Matucho (1962, 1965)
- Trampero (1968, 1973)
- Estribillo (1978, 1980)
- Rico Raco (1987, 1988)
- Papayero (1987, 1988)
- Lechón (1990, 1991)
- Pretal (1995, 1996)
- Canteado (1995, 1996)
- Compadre, 2 (2013, 2018).
