= Cancura =

- Interactive map of Cancura
- Coordinates: 40°45′31.01″S 72°57′48.81″W
- Region: Los Lagos
- Province: Osorno
- Municipalidad: Osorno
- Comuna: Osorno

Government
  - Type: Municipalidad
  - Alcalde: Emeterio Carrillo Torres
- Elevation: 72 m (236 ft)

Population (2017 census)
  - Total: 786
- Time zone: UTC−04:00 (Chilean Standard)
  - Summer (DST): UTC−03:00 (Chilean Daylight)
- Area code: Country + town = 56 + 64

Cancura is a village (Spanish: aldea) in the southeastern part of the commune of Osorno in south-central Chile. It lies along the left (northern) bank of Rahue River about halfway between its origin in Rupanco Lake and its passage through the city of Osorno. The town had 786 inhabitants as of 2017.
