= Juan Carlos Loaiza =

Chilean rodeo horse rider

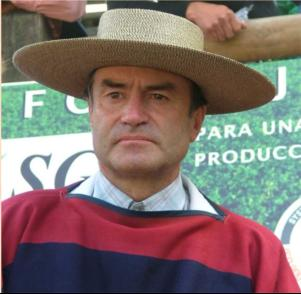
Juan Loaiza

Juan Carlos Loaiza MacLeod is a Chilean rodeo horse rider. He won the Chilean National Rodeo Championship in 1987, 1988, 1994, 2000, 2001, 2002 and 2007, equalling the record of seven championship wins set by Ramón Cardemil. In 2009 he was named among the best Chilean riders of the 21st century by the Chilean Rodeo Foundation.

== National Rodeo Championship ==
Year	Collera (Header)	Horses	Points	Association
1987	Carlos Mondaca	"Rico Raco" - "Papayero"	22	Valdivia
1988	Carlos Mondaca	"Rico Raco" - "Papayero"	35	Valdivia
1994	Eduardo Tamayo	"Esbelta" - "Escandaloza"	35	Valdivia
2000	Eduardo Tamayo	"Talento" - "Escorpión"	40	Valdivia
2001	Luis Eduardo Cortés	"Batuco" - "Banquero"	41	Valdivia
2002	Eduardo Tamayo	"Talento" - "Almendra"	36	Valdivia
2007	Eduardo Tamayo	"Talento" - "Fiestera"	38	Valdivia

== See also ==
- Huaso
- Chilean Horse
