= Damas River (Chile) =

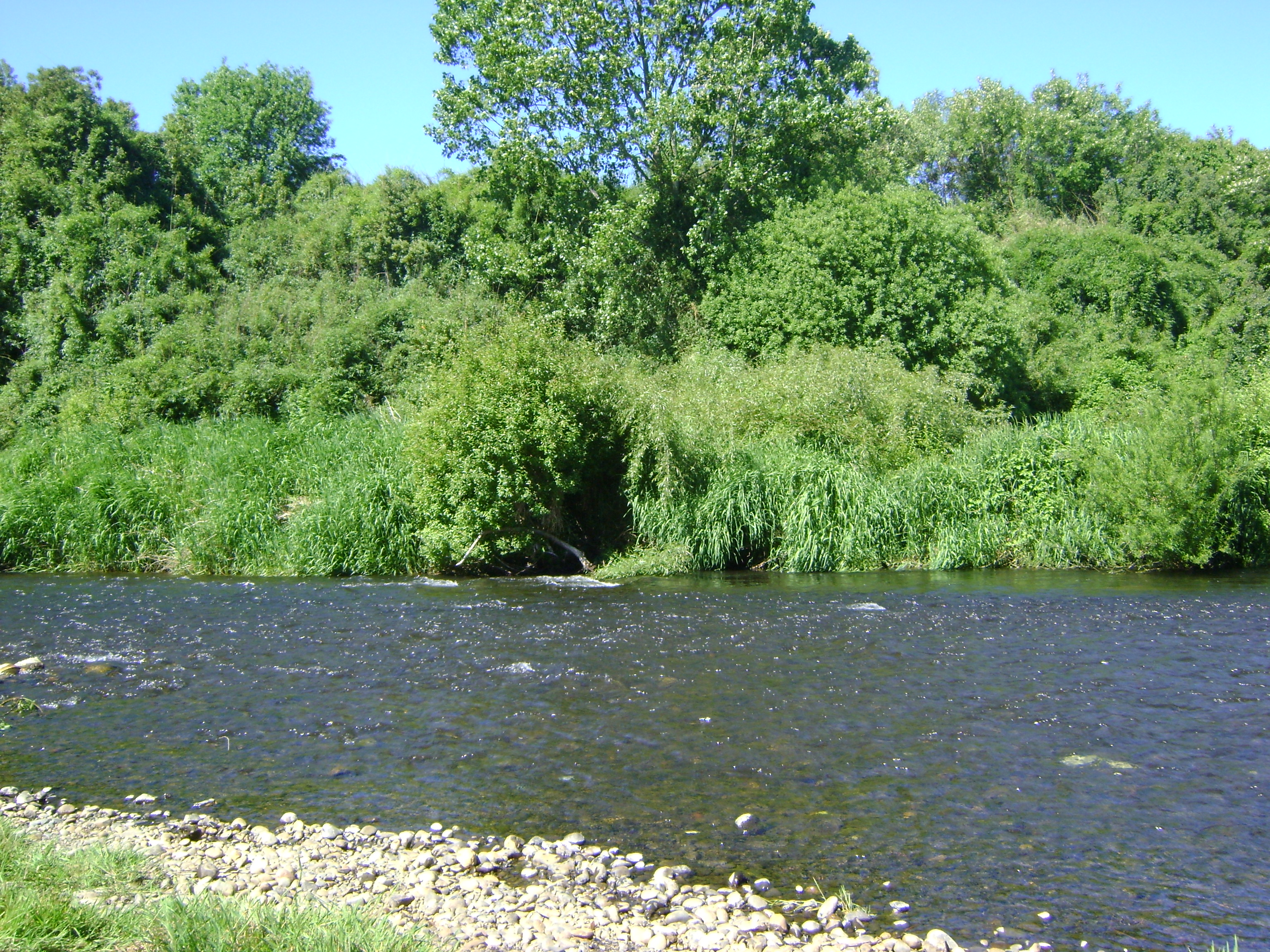
- Damas River seen from the Chuyaca sector of Osorno

Location
- Country: Chile

Physical characteristics
- Source
  - location: Quema del Buey (Entre Lagos)
- Mouth: Rahue River
  - location: Osorno, Chile
  - coordinates: 40°34′20″S 73°08′48″W

Damas River or de Las Damas River (Spanish: río Damas) is a river of Chile located in Los Lagos Region. The river originates at an area known as Quema del Buey in the commune of Entre Lagos between Puyehue and Rupanco Lake. The river ends at its convergence with Rahue River. Damas River traverses the city of Osorno from east to west and separates the neighborhood of Pilauco from the rest of the city.
