= Medialuna =

Crescent-shaped corral used for rodeos

A medialuna (literally half moon) is a crescent-shaped corral used for rodeos, the official sport in Chile. They are generally 64 to 66 metres (70 to 72 yd) in diameter. Chilean rodeos are not quite the same sport famous in the American West; they involve two riders on horseback trying to herd a calf around a circular arena, attempting to pin him against several large cushions.

The main medialuna in Chile is the Medialuna Monumental de Rancagua. Located in the city of Rancagua, it currently seats 12,000 spectators. It is the home of the annual National Championship of Chilean Rodeo. It hosted the 2006 Davis Cup matches of Chile against Slovakia and the 2009 Davis Cup against Austria.

In Osorno, Chile, the medialuna is known as La Medialuna de Osorno. The Medialuna de Osorno was the first covered medialuna in Chile, and is considered one of the highest quality. Rodeos are organized by the Club Osorno René Soriano Bórquez. It boasts a 64-metre (210 ft) diameter arena, seating capacity of approximately 4,800, and an in-house cafeteria. In 2006, the medialuna was the qualifying arena for the Southern Region of the Campeonato Nacional de Rodeo, the nationwide Rodeo competition.

Rodeo is the second most popular sport in Chile after football. It began in roughly the 16th century during the rule of Governor García Hurtado de Mendoza. At the time, the cattle in Chile were not well identified and it was not uncommon for the animals to get lost. To help prevent the loss, Governor Hurtado proclaimed that, in Santiago, every 24th and 25 July, the commemoration of Saint Jacob - patron saint of the city -, the cattle would be gathered in the Plaza de Armas de Santiago to be branded and selected. This is basically how Chilean rodeo began.

== See also ==
- Huaso
- Chilean Horse
