= Cardemil =

Cardemil is a surname most commonly found in Chile. Notable people with the surname include:

- Alberto Cardemil (born 1945), Chilean politician
- Ramón Cardemil (1917–2007), Chilean rodeo horse rider
