= Maura Rivera =

Chilean dancer (born 1984)

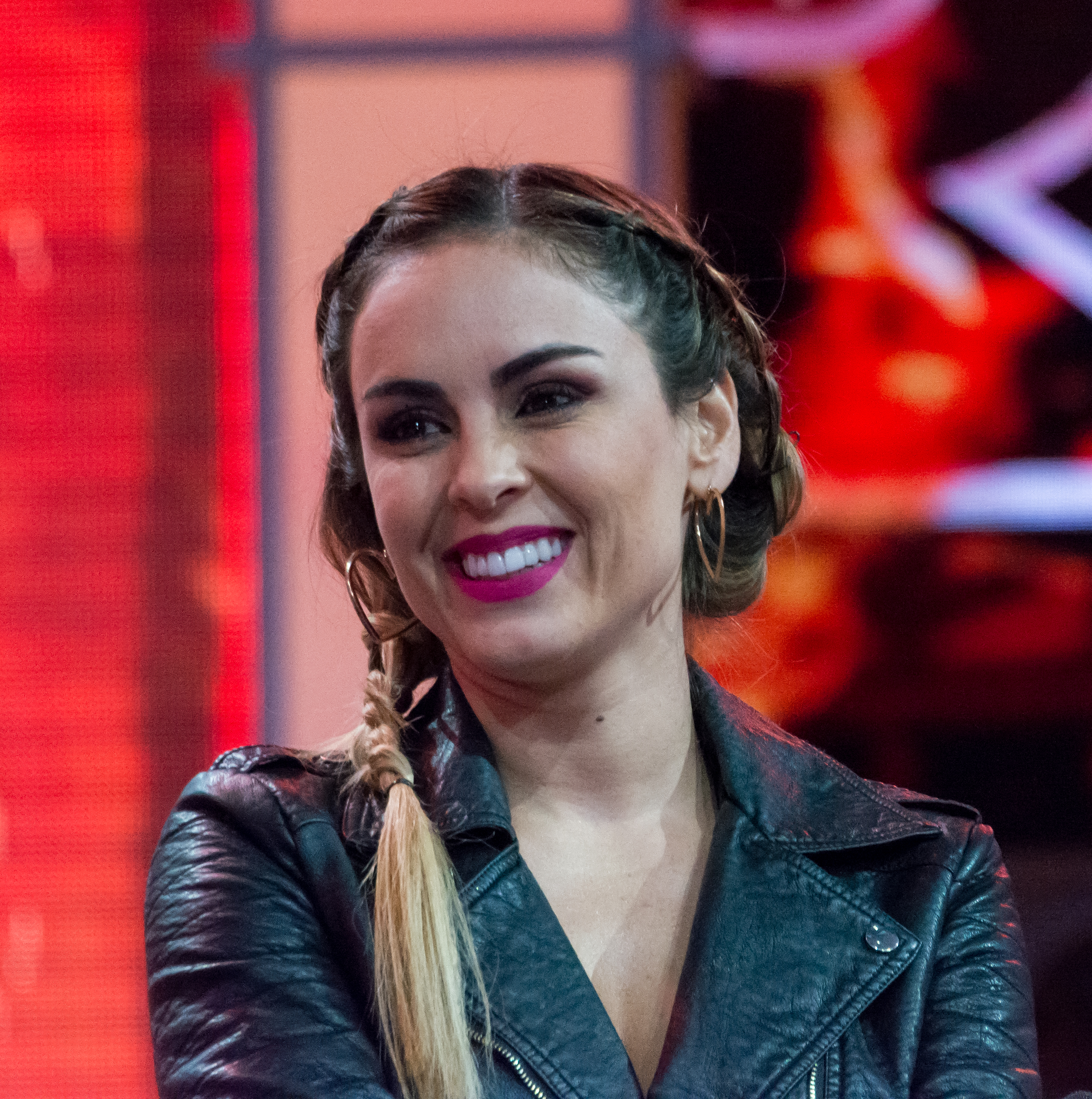
- Born: Maura Verónica Rivera Díaz; December 18, 1984 (age 41); Santiago, Chile
- Occupations: Dancer, television performer

Maura Verónica Rivera Díaz (born December 18, 1984) is a Chilean dancer and television performer.

Rivera was born in Santiago, Chile. She was a stable member of the Clan Rojo, on TVN's TV show Rojo Fama Contra Fama from its inception in 2002 to its restructuring in 2008. Among her achievements are a gold record, winning the competition of the "Símbolo Rojo", and the highest score of the program.

On September 8, 2008, she helped organize a march against the Chilean rodeo, organized by AnimaNaturalis. In an interview Rivera expressed her passion for animals and how she detested the use of fur in fashion. In early 2016, Rivera became a vegetarian for ethical reasons.

She supported Chilean presidential candidate Sebastián Piñera.

Rivera is the wife of the retired footballer Mark González.

== Rojo Fama Contrafama ==
The last competition in which Maura Rivera participated, the "Rojo Fama Contrafama", she faced the winners of the first three competitions through testing totally new to the program. Of the 15 singers and 16 dancers participating only 8 of each would be selected for a year-long contract with TVN. Maura Rivera earned staunch public support during the show and took part in "Clan of Gold". Rivera was judged eighth in the competition by the actual jury.

While she was already known in by most in the country, it was not until a musical gala in the show Gran Rojo in the second season that Maura Rivera consolidated her position as one of the most popular personalities on "Rojo Fama Contra Fama". The dancer scored the highest of the night and the highest in the history of the popular program, at 44 points.

After becoming popular, Rivera was invited by the show to record a song with her partner Yamna Lobos. They recorded a cover of the song "La Cocotera" (The Coconut) and earned a gold record.

== After Rojo ==
Maura Rivera later competed in IWT's Stars on Ice and was a panelist on Channel 13's Alfombra Roja" and Viña 50 Años. The dancer also starred in the music video "Lady Love Me" by the group Canal Magdalena.

== Measurements ==
- height: 1.65 m (5 ft 5 in)
