= Hugo Cardemil =

Hugo Cardemil Moraga
Personal information
- Born: 1925 Curicó, Chile
- Died: May 31, 2019 (aged 94) Curicó, Chile

Sport
- Sport: Chilean rodeo

Hugo Cardemil Moraga (Curicó, Chile, 1925-May 31, 2019) was a Chilean huaso and rodeo rider, four-time champion of the National Rodeo Championship (in 1986, 1990, 1991, and 1993). He was the brother of the historic jockey Ramón Cardemil, seven-time champion of the championship and chosen as the best jockey of the 20th century by the Chilean Rodeo Federation.

== Public life ==
For years, he hadn't achieved any major triumphs in rodeo, and he was always in the shadow of his brothers Hernán and Ramón, who had distinguished rodeo titles. In the quinchas, he was almost considered a fool. Many people in the 1970s and 1980s commented that he always fell before reaching the highest levels of competition.

But over the years, he became a pioneer in taking up rodeo professionally, even though for almost a decade and a half, the results didn't go his way, despite his daily training.

Although he wasn't a breeder, he tended to have good horses, buying young ones, grooming them, and developing them into champions.

His first appearances in high-level competition were in the late 1960s. Over the next two decades, he earned second place in 1972 and in 1968 alongside his brother Hernán, riding "Jalisco" and "Lolol."

The 1970s were years in which Hugo Cardemil's style began to develop: his characteristics as an analytical observer were complemented by his pragmatic horsemanship. In the late 1970s, he rode with Pablo Quera, and after the Curicó native's death, he rode with Guillermo Barra. With this last rider he achieved his first major title: First place in the 1986 National Rodeo Championship, riding "Salteador III" and "Pensamiento", they achieved 23 good points. A year earlier, he had been named best rodeo athlete by the Circle of Sports Journalists of Chile (CPD).

Years later, Guillermo Barra left for the Lo Miranda stud farm, and Cardemil opted for a young José 'Joselo' Astaburuaga. He had followed him for some time while he was racing without a stable stud farm. After racing together for only a year, they won the title in 1990, riding "Lechón" and "Reservado," with 31 points. A year later, they would again take first place, this time riding "Esquinazo" and "Reservado." The following year, riding the same horses, they took second place.

Hugo Cardemil's moment of greatest glory came in the 1993 National Rodeo Championship. Once again, together with Joselo Astaburuaga, they won the championship, riding "Esquinazo" and "Reservado," with a spectacular 36 points. It was the third title for the team and the fourth for Cardemil, who became the rider with the third most titles in Chile, surpassed only by his brother Ramón and Ruperto Valderrama.

He died on May 31, 2019, in Curicó and received a multitudinous farewell.

== Career Achievement Award ==
In March 2008, the Revista del Campo of El Mercurio awarded him the Sports Career Award for his outstanding sporting career and four national titles. The award was presented by the newspaper's owner, Agustín Edwards Eastman, who was then the president of the Chilean Horse Breeders Federation. Upon receiving the award, he stated:

"It's the greatest thing I've ever received. It's very exciting to receive it at this age. The affection of all these people is the most beautiful thing I have."

== National Championships ==
Year	Team	Horses	Score	Association
1986	Guillermo Barra	"Salteador III" and "Pensamiento"	23	Curicó
1990	José Astaburuaga	"Lechón" and "Reservado"	31	Curicó
1991	José Astaburuaga	"Esquinazo" and "Reservado"	31	Curicó
1993	José Astaburuaga	"Esquinazo" and "Reservado"	36	Curicó

=== Second Championships ===
- 1968: with Hernán Cardemil, riding "Duraznillo" and "Utilero" with 23 points.
- 1972: with Hernán Cardemil, riding "Jalisco" and "Lolo" with 15 points.
- 1986: with Guillermo Barra, riding "Reservado" and "Curanto" with 20 points.
- 1989: with José Astaburuaga, riding "Reservado" and "Lechón" with 28 points.
- 1992: with José Astaburuaga, riding "Esquinazo" and "Reservado" with 33 points.
