= Yamna Lobos =

Chilean dancer, television host, and actress

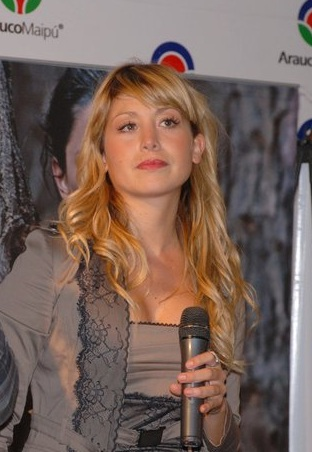
- Yamna Lobos in 2011
- Born: Yamna Carolina Lobos Astorga; February 26, 1983 (age 43); Santiago, Chile
- Occupations: Dancer, television performer and actress
- Years active: 2000–present
- Spouse: Cristián Arriagada (2006–2011)

Yamna Carolina Lobos Astorga (born February 26, 1983) is a popular Chilean dancer, television host, and actress.

== Early life ==
Yamna Lobos began her career as a child. Between 10 and 15 years dancing in the Ballet Folclórico de Chile (BAFOCHI), having touring internationally in an unforgettable time that took her to meet and visit countries such as France, Germany, Australia, Belgium, the Netherlands, Sweden, Italy, Spain and Israel

== Career ==
Yamna In 2000 she began her career in television where she is part of "Generation 2000" program "Venga Conmigo" Channel 13, the following year, in 2001, she joined the Mega "Team Mekano". However, soon after fired. A year later she joined the program Rojo fama contrafama of TVN, where gaining greater popularity reached the third place of the first generation of artists (singers and dancers), being the only female among the finalists and making dancers and join the regular cast, Called the "Clan Rojo". In 2003 she underwent surgery for breast implants, then made several photo shoots for the TVN website which wiped out thousands of hits on the Internet that broke all records of visits. At that time, the dancer moved all her fellow Red who had posed for the cameras of the portal. During the first week received 1,881,237 visits, where 542,248 people the first day and had observed. Posed month again, dressed in Egyptian, where in seven days saw 1,218,407 visitors.

On Thursday 22 December 2005 in a gala program that was held at the Teatro Caupolicán of Santiago was awarded the prize for Most Popular of all time such a program, being Yamna the undisputed winner with 47,330 votes from the public More than double the votes than the second place only got 23,430 votes. Yamna Lobos with another dancer (Maura Rivera) recorded a cover of "La Cocotera" from the album "Clan Rojo en Verano" in 2005, the track being heard in the summer of that time and where she also obtained a gold disc . In the same year has a section on the "Noche de Juegos" of TVN, the only dancer of the "Rojo " have a space in a star-studded TV show called "The Department of Yamna Lobos" was a section of the candid camera program.

In September 2006 Yamna Lobos was elected the Queen of the Pampilla Festival. The dancer won over voters with her previous campaign, which included concerts and various activities and was crowned queen of this year with more than 13,700 votes from the public who attended the event, considered the favorite in the group of candidates opponents.

In 2007 she made international tours in Miami and Australia with some members of the "Clan Rojo". In the first tour traveled to perfect for Zumba trainer also recorded a video appearances for Mexico where she teaches the rhythm of this dance. At the end of the year closes a cycle in Rojo fama contrafama program to make room for new members, renewing the complete program and exit the program Yamna and emblematic of them.

In late January 2008 she participated actively as a candidate for queen of the "Festival de la leche y la carne" in Osorno, along with three other candidates who won and was crowned queen for nearly double the votes of second place.

In April 2008, signed a contract with Chilevisión, and appears on "Teatro en Chilevisión", "Sin Verguenza" and "Yingo", performing spaces such as, "The Ranking of All Time", in addition to their music and unfolding in the role of the jury. In October 2008 launched their single, "Acercate a Mí, " which is part of the second official CD of this program.

On June 24, 2010 waiver "Yingo" not feel comfortable playing the role of the jury in which to discuss and often conflict with their own colleagues was not in her plans, but part of the second series series of the program "Don Diablo".

After resigning "Yingo", was hired by the cable TV channel Bang TV as host of two programs which she leads, "Danz", who is teaching dance steps, where people can learn about the rhythms and music of today and "Soundtrax" the urban genre and interview program, which brings guests each program, which also call your favorite topics. On August 9, 2010 makes its first appearance.

In 2012, driving the program ends Danz and share with the program called urban music all sounds the same channel Bang TV, with Simoney Romero. On Monday, January 9 she made her first appearance on the program Body Paint.

In 2012 poses for the fourth day in which she confessed that although it was uncomfortable for her and led to some personal problems was an unforgettable experience, but no regrets, no plans to repeat

== Filmography ==
Year	Program	Channel	Role
2000	Venga conmigo	Channel 13	Dancer
2001	Mekano	Mega	Dancer
2004–2005	Noche de juegos	TVN	Model
2002–2007	Rojo fama contrafama	TVN	Contestant/Dancer
2008	Gente como tú	Chilevisión	Dancer
2009	Fiebre de baile 2	Chilevisión	Contestant/Dancer
2008–2010	Yingo	Chilevisión	Jury/Dancer
2010–2011	Danz	Bang TV	Host
2010–2012	Soundtrax	Bang TV	Host
2012	Todo suena	Bang TV	Host
2012	Mundos opuestos	Channel 13	Contestant

== Acting roles ==
Movie
Year	Film	Character	Director
2006	Rojo, La Película	Jimena Fuentes	Nicolás Acuña
Soap Operas
Year	Soap Opera	Character	Channel
2010	Don Diablo	Virginia Santa Cruz	Chilevisión
TV Series
Year	Serie	Character	Channel
2004	La vida es una lotería	Susana	TVN
2008	Teatro en Chilevisión	Nurse	Chilevisión
2008	El club de la comedia	Herself	Chilevisión
2009	Teatro en Chilevisión	Commercial manager	Chilevisión
2012	Teatro en Chilevisión	Pepa	Chilevisión

== Competitions ==
Year	Place	Program
2003	Third Place dancers	Rojo fama contrafama
2004	Fifth Place dancers	Rojo fama contrafama
2009	Second Place fiebre de baile II	Fiebre de Baile 2
2012	Sixteenth eliminated Mundos Opuestos	Mundos Opuestos
2013	Second Place; Baila! Al ritmo de un sueño	Baila! Al ritmo de un sueño

== Awards and nominations ==
Year	Award	Category	Result
2010	TV-Grama	Best Young Actress	Nominated
2011	Gold Tie	Best Young Host	Nominated
2011	Gold Tie	Most Popular Teenager	Nominated
2012	Gold Tie	Most Popular Teenager	Nominated
