= AnimaNaturalis =

Animal rights organization

- Founded: March 2003; 23 years ago
- Purpose: Animal rights
- Region served: Spain and Latin America
- Method: Education and activism
- Website: www.animanaturalis.org/en

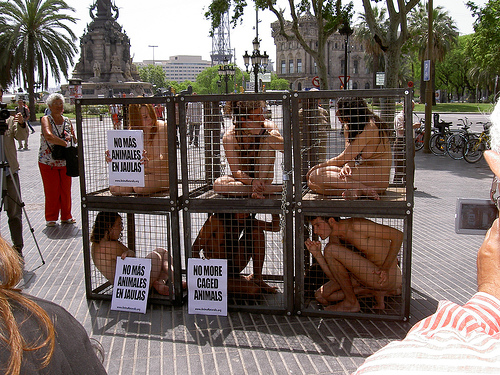
AnimaNaturalis demonstration against the sale of animals in La Rambla, Barcelona

AnimaNaturalis is an international non profit animal rights organization whose mission is to "Establish, promote and protect the rights of all animals in Spain and Latin America. These rights include the right to life, liberty, and not to be tortured stop being considered property." It was founded in March, 2003 by Leonora Esquivel Frías and Francisco Vásquez Neira.

AnimaNaturalis has offices in Spain, as well as several Latin American countries (Argentina, Chile, Colombia, Ecuador, Mexico, and Venezuela).

== Programs ==
AnimaNaturalis speaks out against the use of the animals as food (concerns with industrial farms, industrial fishing and foie gras); in laboratories (animal testing); to wear as clothing (concerns with using fur, leather, silk, wool and feathers); as entertainment (circuses, zoos, aquariums, sports, hunting, and racing); and raises awareness about cruel traditions such as rodeos, bullfighting, cockfighting, and dogfighting.

Companion animal programs include education about issues like keeping pets out of hot cars, the importance of spaying and neutering, and pet adoption. They also raise awareness about the connection between abuse of animals and violence toward humans, including children.

== Selected history ==
In 2008, the famous Spanish singer Alaska collaborated with them in a joint campaign with PETA, posing nude in a picture to raise awareness for what she considers cruel activity, bullfighting.

AnimaNaturalis has also organized protests against the skin industry, like Sin Piel, (No Fur) which became the single most massive protest on this subject ever done in Spain. It has also been realised in Argentina, where they counted with the collaboration of the actress Marcela Kloosterboer.

In Chile, they organize annual marches against the mistreatment undergone by young bulls in the Chilean rodeo. The last march, which took place September 6, 2008, had the collaboration of the Chilean dancer Maura Rivera.

== See also ==
- List of animal rights groups
