= Iris Sanguesa =

Chilean composer, pianist and percussionist (born 1933)

- Iris Sangüesa
- Born: 1933 (age 92–93); Osorno, Chile
- Education: Chilean National Conservatory of Music
- Occupations: composer, pianist
- Known for: first Chilean composer in electronic music

Iris Sanguesa de Ichasso (née Sanguesa Hinostroza) (born March 3, 1933), known as Iris Sangüesa, is a Chilean composer, pianist and percussionist defined as the first composer in electronic music in her country.

== Biography ==
Sanguesa was born in Osorno, Chile. She graduated from the Chilean National Conservatory in Santiago in 1959 and received a fellowship to study at the Torcuato Di Tella Institute’s CLAEM (Centro Latinamericano de Altos Estudios Musicales) in Buenos Aires from 1967 to 1968, becoming one of the first women to study at the prestigious institution.

At CLAEM, she composed several multimedia pieces and her teachers included Gustavo Becerra-Schmidt, German Berner, Jorge Canelo, Augustin Cullel, Alberto Ginastera, Flora Guerra, and Herminia Raccagni.

Sanguesa lived in Argentina from 1985 to 2001, before returning to Chile where she taught at various institutions in Santiago.

In 2024, the Department of Music at the University of Chile paid tribute to her as "the first Chilean composer in electronic music."

== Main compositions ==
=== Ballet ===
- Copahue, on an Auracanian Legend
- Los Trabajos del Bailarin

=== Chamber ===
- Quartet (percussion)
- Quartet (wind instruments)
- Quintet for Winds
- Sonata (double bass and piano)
- Sonata (flute and piano)
- Sonata (harp)

=== Multimedia ===
- Intergracion (tape, dancer, and color projections)
- Llaman las llamas (synthesizer, piano, voice, narrator, double bass and percussion; text by Marcos Llona)
- Oda a la Humanidad (six voices, mixed choir, orchestra and tape)
- Permanencia I (tape)
- Permanencia II-Espiral (tape)

=== Orchestra ===
- Abastractas
- Aforismos del Bhagavad Gita
- Estudios Orquestrales
- Sincresis
- Transiciones

=== Piano ===
- Canción Araucana
- El Pianista Chileno (for children)
- Mariposas
- Pieces for Children
- Variations

=== Vocal ===
- “Hymn for Liceo Gabriela Mistral"
- “Hymn for Liceo Manuel de Salas”
- “Hymn for the Swiss College”
