= Alexis Caiguan =

Chilean politician and educator

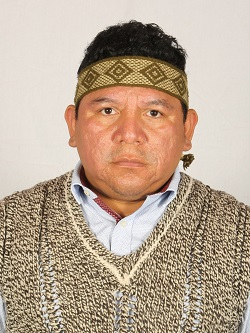

Member of the Constitutional Convention of Chile
- In office 4 July 2021 – 4 July 2022
- Preceded by: office established

Personal details
- Born: Alexis Reinaldo Caiguan Ancapan; August 18, 1975 (age 50) Osorno, Chile
- Occupation: Educator

Alexis Reinaldo Caiguan Ancapan (born 18 August 1975) is a Mapuche-Huilliche educator, musician, and politician in Chile. In 2021, Caiguan was elected to serve as a member of the Constitutional Convention of Chile to represent the Mapuche people in the Los Lagos Region.

== Early life and career ==
Caiguan was born on 18 August 1975 in Osorno, Chile in the Huilliche Pangui Ku community. As a traditional educator, Caiguan has worked for five years the Entre Lagos School in Puyehue, Osorno Province. Caiguan has long been active in indigenous activism, and previously served as the President of the Panguiku Urban Indigenous Community.

== Political career ==
In the 2021 Chilean Constitutional Convention election, Caiguan was elected to one of the seven reserved seats for the Mapuche people. Carmen Jaramillo, a fellow Mapuche activist and academic, was initially slated to serve on the body, but was replaced by Caiguan in order to comply with gender parity rules.

As a member of the Constitutional Convention, Caiguan has used his platform to advocate for the welfare of Mapuche activists targeted in the Mapuche conflict. Caiguan signed onto a letter condemning the killing of Pablo Marchant, a 29-year old Mapuche man shot in the head and killed by the Carabineros de Chile. During the election for President of the Constitutional Convention, Caiguan supported the successful candidacy of fellow Mapuche activist Elisa Loncón.
