= Bang TV =

- Country: Chile

Programming
- Language: Spanish
- Picture format: 480i (SDTV 16:9); 1080i (HDTV)

Ownership
- Owner: TVI Chile S.A

History
- Launched: December 2008
- Closed: June 1, 2020
- Replaced by: N/A
- Former names: BoomBox TV

Links
- Website: http://www.bangtv.cl

Bang TV (formerly BoomBox) was a Chilean television channel owned by TVI Filmocentro S.A focused on music ranging from the broadcasting of national production, also including genres like Reggaetón, K-pop and pop music.

== Story ==
The channel started originally in 2007 as a TV show in the channel Via X, called Bang! Todo suena, focused on reggaeton genre and hosted by Monserrat Torrent and Romina Saez, two celebrities from the popular TV program Mekano, broadcast by MEGA a few years before.

Due to the high popularity of the reggaeton among chilean people, Via X executive producers find out the idea to create a TV channel focused exclusive to the genre. After various promotions in other TV channels, which also included support from Puerto Rican rapper and singer Daddy Yankee, the channel was finally launched in December 2008 as BoomBox TV, exclusively to the Telmex (now Claro) operator.

In 2010 the name was reverted to Bang TV because the name BoomBox TV was already registered. Most of the video clips of the songs were expanded in other segments and TV shows, but without losing the urban popularity.

== Broadcast end ==
The channel abruptly ended its transmissions on June 1, 2020 after almost 12 years on broadcast. The next day the channel was removed from Claro TV grid.

== Programs ==
- Todo suena, with Yamna Lobos and Simoney Romero
- Soundtrax, with Yamna Lobos.
- Danz, with Simoney Romero.
- Mi bloke, with Sabrina Sosa and Andreina Chateing.
- Rankeao with Sabrina Sosa and Juan Pedro Verdier.
- NewsBox, with Andreina Chateing.
- Curiocity with Juan Pedro Verdier.
- ¿Y sabías qué? with Camila Venegas.

=== Previous programs ===
- Pasa el mic
- Sexy movimiento
- Car Wash
- 2x1
- Versus
