= Alberto Cardemil =

Chilean politician (born 1945)

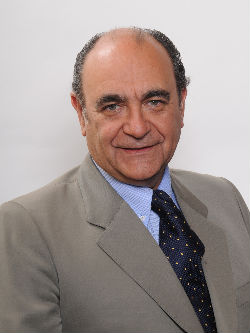

Member of the Chamber of Deputies
- In office 11 March 1994 – 11 March 2014
- Preceded by: Carlos Bombal
- Succeeded by: Felipe Kast
- Constituency: 22nd District

Undersecretary of Interior
- In office 22 May 1984 – 28 October 1988
- Preceded by: Luis Figueroa del Río
- Succeeded by: Gonzalo García Balmaceda

Personal details
- Born: 1 November 1945 (age 80) Chimbarongo, Chile
- Party: Renovación Nacional
- Spouse: María Loreto Palacios
- Children: Four
- Education: Pontifical Catholic University of Chile (LL.B)
- Occupation: Politician
- Profession: Lawyer

Alberto Eugenio Cardemil Herrera (born 1 November 1945) is a Chilean politician.

== Family and Early Life ==
He was born on 1 November 1945 in Chimbarongo. He is the son of Elba Herrera Muñoz and Ramón Cardemil Moraga, a prominent Chilean rodeo rider who, after winning seven national titles, became one of the country’s leading figures in the sport.

He is married to María Loreto Palacios Rodríguez and is the father of four children: Alberto, Juan Cristóbal, María Javiera, and Juan de Dios.

== Professional career ==
He completed his primary and secondary education at the Instituto San Martín, Hermanos Maristas of Curicó. He later entered the Faculty of Law at the Pontifical Catholic University of Chile in Santiago. In 1969, he qualified as a lawyer with the thesis Los sistemas de administración de la seguridad social (“Systems of Administration of Social Security”). In 1985, he completed a Master’s degree in Political Science at the University of Chile and the University of Salamanca in Spain, and also undertook advanced studies in economics and labor law.

Between 1969 and 1983, he practiced law in Curicó, Talca, and Santiago. At the same time, he engaged in agricultural activities in the areas of Curicó and Las Cabras (which he left in 1990) and held various public positions related to the agricultural sector. He also served as adviser to companies and business and labor organizations in the agricultural and industrial sectors, including the Chamber of Commerce and the Confederation of Agricultural Producers.

Between 1978 and 1983, he was appointed vice president of the Private Development Corporation of Curicó (Corpride), and in 1989 he became its director. Between 1983 and 1985, he served as adviser to the Ministry of Agriculture. From 1985 to 1986, he was Executive Vice President of the Instituto de Desarrollo Agropecuario (INDAP).

In parallel with his parliamentary career, he taught at Diego Portales University and at the University of Arts, Sciences and Communication (UNIACC). He has also been a member of the weekly public opinion committee of the Consorcio Periodístico de Chile (COPESA) and a partner in the law firm Rodríguez, Cardemil y Uribe-Echeverría, Abogados y Cía. Ltda., founded in 1991.

== Political career ==
Between 1985 and 1989, he served as acting Undersecretary of Agriculture during the government of Augusto Pinochet. In 1986, under the same administration, he was appointed Undersecretary of the Interior for a three-year term. In that capacity, he publicly announced the results of the 1988 Chilean national plebiscite and represented the State during the visit of Pope John Paul II to Chile. In 1989, he was among the founders of National Renewal (RN).

After the return to democracy, he ran for the Senate representing the VII North Region in the 1989 parliamentary elections but was not elected.

Between 1990 and 1992, he was a member of his party’s Political Commission. In 1997, he was elected vice president and later, from 1998 to July 2001, president of National Renewal. During his leadership, he directed the party in the 1999 presidential election and the 2000 municipal elections. On 7 July 2005, he resigned from RN after his party colleague Sebastián Piñera was proclaimed presidential candidate.

He aligned himself with the Independent Democratic Union (UDI) and supported the presidential candidacy of Joaquín Lavín, Piñera’s direct competitor within the Alliance for Chile. Despite his resignation, he later supported Sebastián Piñera in the second round when he became the sole candidate of his political coalition. He remained independent until early November 2008, when he rejoined National Renewal.
