= Federación del Rodeo Chileno =

Organization regularing rodeo events im Chile

The Federación del Rodeo Chileno (Chilean Federation of Rodeo) regulates rodeo events in Chile. Chilean Rodeo is the official National Sport of Chile.

It was originally chartered on January 10, 1962, in Santiago.
