= Osorno, Chile =

Osorno
- City and Commune
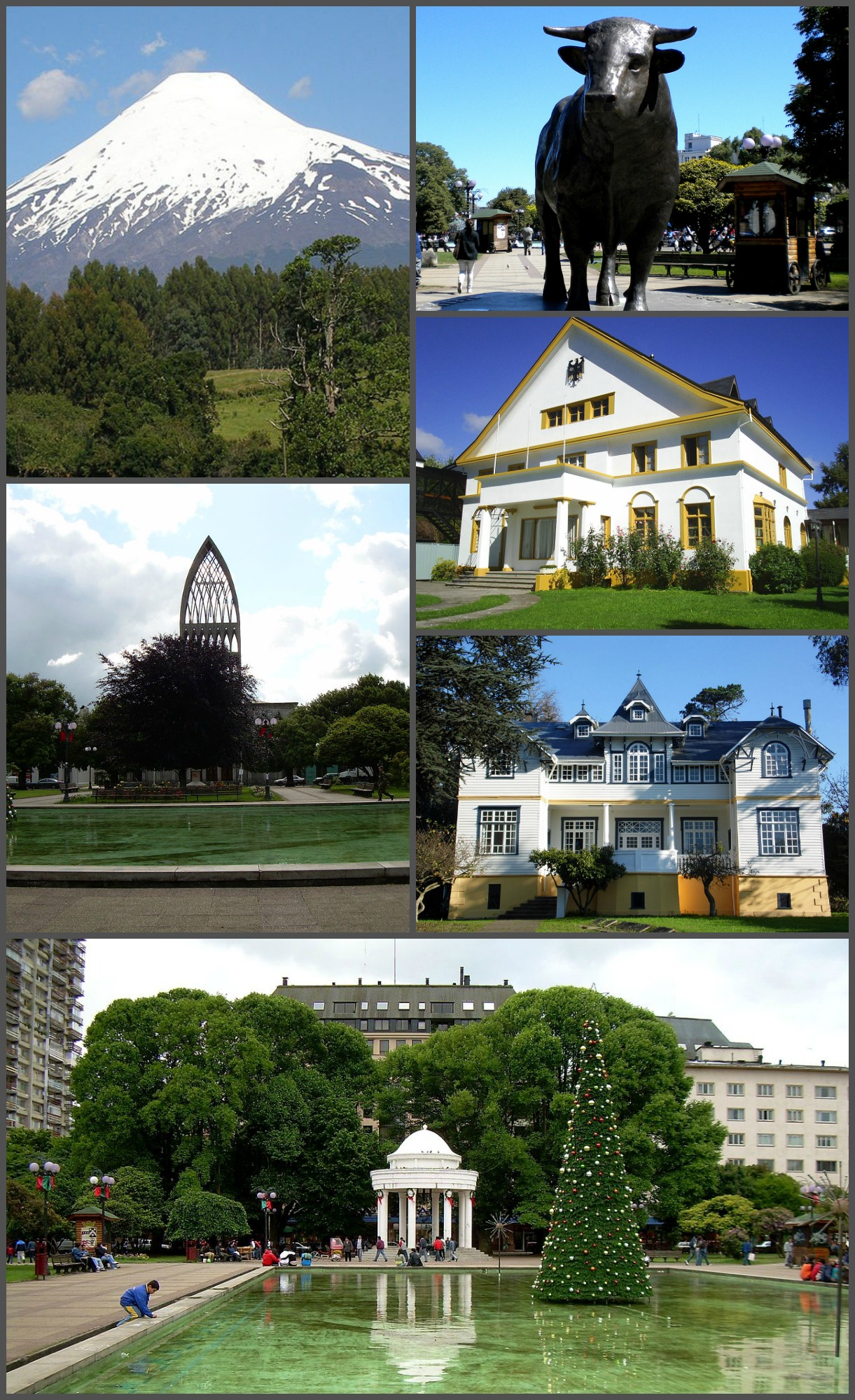

- Flag Coat of arms Location of Osorno commune within Los Lagos Region Location in Chile
- Coordinates (alcalde's office): 40°34′21″S 73°08′07″W
- Country: Chile
- Region: Los Lagos
- Province: Osorno
- Commune: Osorno
- Founded: 1558
- Named for: Osorno la Mayor, Spain

Government
  - Type: Municipality
  - Alcalde: Jaime Alberto Bertin Valenzuela (DC)

Area
  - City and Commune: 951.3 km^{2} (367.3 sq mi)
- Elevation: 35 m (115 ft)

Population (2023 estimation)
  - City and Commune: 175,670
  - Rank: 32nd in Chile; 14th (Agglomeration)
  - Density: 184.7/km^{2} (478.3/sq mi)
  - Urban: 144,493
  - Metro: 221,500
  - Locality/City: 145,744
- Demonym: Osornino

Sex
  - Men: 70,743
  - Women: 74,732
- Time zone: UTC−4 (CLT)
  - Summer (DST): UTC−3 (CLST)
- Postal code: 5290000
- Area code: 56 + 64
- Climate: Cfb
- Website: Official website (in Spanish)

Osorno (Mapuche: Chauracavi) is a city and commune in southern Chile and capital of Osorno Province in the Los Lagos Region. It had a population of 145,475, as of the 2002 census. It is located 945 kilometres (587 mi) south of the national capital of Santiago, 105 kilometres (65 mi) north of the regional capital of Puerto Montt and 260 kilometres (160 mi) west of the Argentine city of San Carlos de Bariloche, connected via International Route 215 through the Cardenal Antonio Samoré Pass. It is a gateway for land access to the far south regions of Aysén and Magallanes, which would otherwise be accessible only by sea or air from the rest of the country.

Located at the confluence of the Rahue and Damas Rivers, Osorno is the main service centre of agriculture and cattle farming in the northern Los Lagos Region. The city's cultural heritage is shaped by Huilliche, Spanish, and German influences.

== History ==
=== Prehistory ===
The city of Osorno is built upon river terraces formed during the last of Earth's geological periods —the Quaternary. 130,000 years ago, during the transition from the Santa María glaciation and the Valdivia interglacial the area of Osorno was covered by pyroclastic material derivative from large and explosive volcanic eruptions in the Andes. The substrate of Osorno is accordingly made of various combinations of volcanic ash, lapilli, sand and gravel with occasional layers of peat. The city hosts the paleontological and archaeological site of Pilauco Bajo, where human footprints and lithic artifacts dating to the Late Pleistocene have been found. There is an adjoining museum and park dedicated to the site.

=== Old Osorno ===
The city was originally planned to be founded in 1553, under the Government of Pedro de Valdivia by his companion of conquest, Lieutenant General Don Francisco de Villagra; with the name of Santa Marina de Gaete, on the site of a Huilliche village named Chauracavi. However, Valdivia's death prevented the realization of this plan before it could materialize.

On 27 March 1558, the city was finally founded by governor García Hurtado de Mendoza, with the new name of Villa de San Mateo de Osorno, in honor of his grandfather, Count of Osorno. Osorno is a municipio in Palencia province, Castile and León, Spain. In the summer of 1567, various settlers of Osorno joined Ruiz de Gamboa's expedition to Chiloé Archipelago. On December 1575 Osorno was struck by a major earthquake and the following year hostilities between Spanish and Mapuches, which had begun farther north, reached Osorno. Osorno was destroyed again by the indigenous Huilliche people in October 1602. The destruction of Osorno forced Spaniards and the remaining indigenous allies to migrate south to the vicinity of Chiloé Archipelago where Spanish rule was still upheld. Indigenous allies the followed the Spanish on their departure were declared indios reyunos and became free of encomienda and held the duty to form a militia. The indios reyunos settled chiefly in Calbuco and Abtao. Fernando de Alvarado, an exile from Osorno, led the Spanish resistance in Chiloé against Dutch invaders in 1643. During the crisis that preceded the Battle of Río Bueno Captain Ignacio Carrera Yturgoyen penetrated with an army from Carelmapu north to the vicinity of the ruins of Osorno where his expedition were approached by Huilliches who handed over three "caciques", allegedly responsible for the murders of the survivors of the wreck of San José.

The plains of Osorno and the whole area between Valdivia and the settlements of Calbuco and Carelmapu remained independent indigenous territory closed to the Spanish. The Spanish had thus little information on this territory and had to rely on hearsay. This lack of concrete knowledge of the territory fueled speculations about the mythical City of the Caesars.

=== New Osorno ===
On 22 November 1792, Tomás de Figueroa, who headed a military expedition from Valdivia took possession of the ruins. The Parliament of Las Canoas held in 1793 established anew peace between Spanish and Mapuche-Huilliche. The treaty allowed for Spanish control of a strip of land between the Rahue (Río de Las Canoas) and Damas Rivers, which included the area of Osorno. Local chiefs Catrihuala, Iñil and Caniu from around Osorno, and other from farther away, participated in the meeting.

Under the orders of Ambrosio O'Higgins, Osorno was again rebuilt by Juan Mackenna, and declared officially re-populated in 1796. O'Higgins, in turn, was awarded the title of Marquess of Osorno. The new settlers of Osorno soon begun to purchase land from the local indigenous families of Catrihuala, Caniu and Colin. These purchases were permitted by local governor Juan Mackenna, who did however claim to have prevented local Huilliche sell lands they needed for subsistence. According Mackenna local caciques sold land to purchase liquour.

Osorno owes its legacy to fairly recent Chilean settlement, when the government subdued the region's indigenous Mapuche peoples in the mid-19th century and opened the land to Chilean and European immigration soon to follow. A large percentage of locals in Osorno are descendants of Spanish (the livestock grazing industry owes its foundation to the Basques) and other European immigrants.

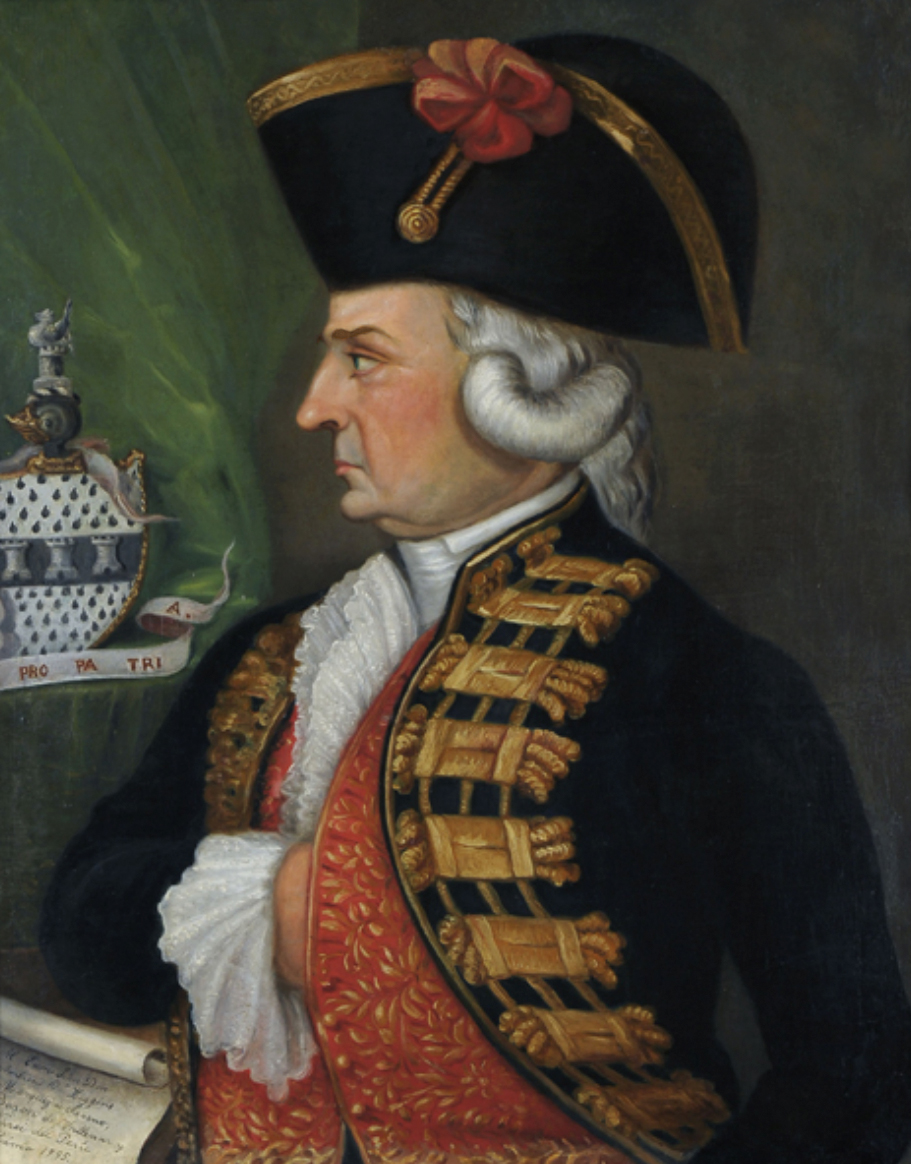
Gen. Ambrosio O'Higgins, founder and Marquis of Osorno

Around 1850, the government of Chile began inviting German settlers to the colony to promote growth in the region; the settlers found Osorno's climate and geography to be very similar to their own. It continues to have a thriving German secondary school. With their help, Osorno was made the home of the National Cattle ranch of Chile, boosting the regional economy significantly. Present-day Osorno has preserved 19th century architecture and urban layout, represented by six picturesque houses which have been designated national monuments.

Osorno has a long history of rivalry with Valdivia, and in a 2006 referendum, the Osorno Province rejected its proposed incorporation into the new Los Ríos Region, of which Valdivia is now the capital.

In 2019 the water supply system of Osorno was contaminated with 1,100 liters of petrol ushering an sanitary and environmental crisis. The crisis led to the water supply system of Osorno to be shut down from July 10 to July 21. The oil spill also effected the Rahue River. ESSAL, the private company in charge of the water supply of Osorno, did not specify the reason for the shut down in the first communique. The government announced that President Sebastián Piñera had canceled a visit to the United States to instead solve the crisis in Osorno. Opposition deputy Emilia Nuyado denounced a media circus on behalf of the government after the water shortage continued following Piñera's visit to the city. Inhabitants of the city went to streets of Osorno to protest calling for the cancellation of ESSAL's water supply concession. ESSAL was to give total discount of 63,250 Chilean pesos (2019) to each of the 47,519 affected clients. In a popular consultation held in Osorno following the 2019 Chilean protests over 90% of the participants voted to end ESSAL's concession. Results are however not binding.

== Climate ==
Osorno has an oceanic climate (Köppen climate classification Cfb) with a drying trend in summer. Winters are cool but mild with a July average of 7.6 °C (45.7 °F). Most of the precipitation falls during this time of the year with May to July being the wettest months, averaging around 180 millimetres (7 in) to 210 millimetres (8 in) of precipitation and humidity is high, averaging around 85%. Snowfalls are rare. Summers are drier and mild with a January average of 17.8 °C (64.0 °F) and during this time, precipitation is lower, averaging 48.9 millimetres (2 in) in January. In some years, many days can go without a day of precipitation such as the case in 1992 when only 1.1 millimetres (0 in) of precipitation was recorded in January while in other years, some summers can have several wet days in a row. Temperatures can occasionally exceed 25 °C (77 °F) anytime from December to March. The average annual precipitation is 1,318 millimetres (52 in) and there are 173 days with measureable precipitation. The record high was 36.5 °C (97.7 °F) in February 2019 and the record low was −8.0 °C (17.6 °F) in July 1954.

Climate data for Osorno, Chile (Cañal Bajo Carlos Hott Siebert Airport) 1991–2020, extremes 1952–present
Month	Jan	Feb	Mar	Apr	May	Jun	Jul	Aug	Sep	Oct	Nov	Dec	Year
Record high °C (°F)	36.1 (97.0)	36.5 (97.7)	34.5 (94.1)	29.2 (84.6)	21.6 (70.9)	20.7 (69.3)	18.6 (65.5)	25.0 (77.0)	24.4 (75.9)	29.0 (84.2)	36.0 (96.8)	35.4 (95.7)	36.5 (97.7)
Mean daily maximum °C (°F)	22.9 (73.2)	23.1 (73.6)	20.5 (68.9)	16.5 (61.7)	13.5 (56.3)	11.0 (51.8)	10.7 (51.3)	12.0 (53.6)	14.1 (57.4)	16.2 (61.2)	18.5 (65.3)	21.0 (69.8)	16.7 (62.1)
Daily mean °C (°F)	15.9 (60.6)	15.8 (60.4)	13.9 (57.0)	11.1 (52.0)	9.4 (48.9)	7.5 (45.5)	7.0 (44.6)	7.8 (46.0)	9.0 (48.2)	10.8 (51.4)	12.6 (54.7)	14.5 (58.1)	11.3 (52.3)
Mean daily minimum °C (°F)	8.7 (47.7)	8.5 (47.3)	7.3 (45.1)	5.8 (42.4)	5.2 (41.4)	4.0 (39.2)	3.2 (37.8)	3.7 (38.7)	4.0 (39.2)	5.4 (41.7)	6.8 (44.2)	8.1 (46.6)	5.9 (42.6)
Record low °C (°F)	−2.0 (28.4)	−5.2 (22.6)	−5.1 (22.8)	−5.2 (22.6)	−7.9 (17.8)	−7.2 (19.0)	−8.0 (17.6)	−5.6 (21.9)	−5.0 (23.0)	−4.3 (24.3)	−4.0 (24.8)	−4.0 (24.8)	−8.0 (17.6)
Average precipitation mm (inches)	40.9 (1.61)	43.4 (1.71)	64.4 (2.54)	105.8 (4.17)	155.0 (6.10)	203.6 (8.02)	162.2 (6.39)	166.2 (6.54)	89.5 (3.52)	83.6 (3.29)	62.9 (2.48)	58.0 (2.28)	1,235.5 (48.64)
Average precipitation days (≥ 1.0 mm)	5.7	5.3	7.7	9.9	13.9	16.6	15.8	16.1	11.9	11.5	8.8	7.2	130.6
Average relative humidity (%)	64	67	72	79	85	87	86	81	75	72	69	66	75
Source 1: Dirección Meteorológica de Chile (humidity 1970–2000)
Source 2: NOAA (precipitation days 1991–2020)

== City ==
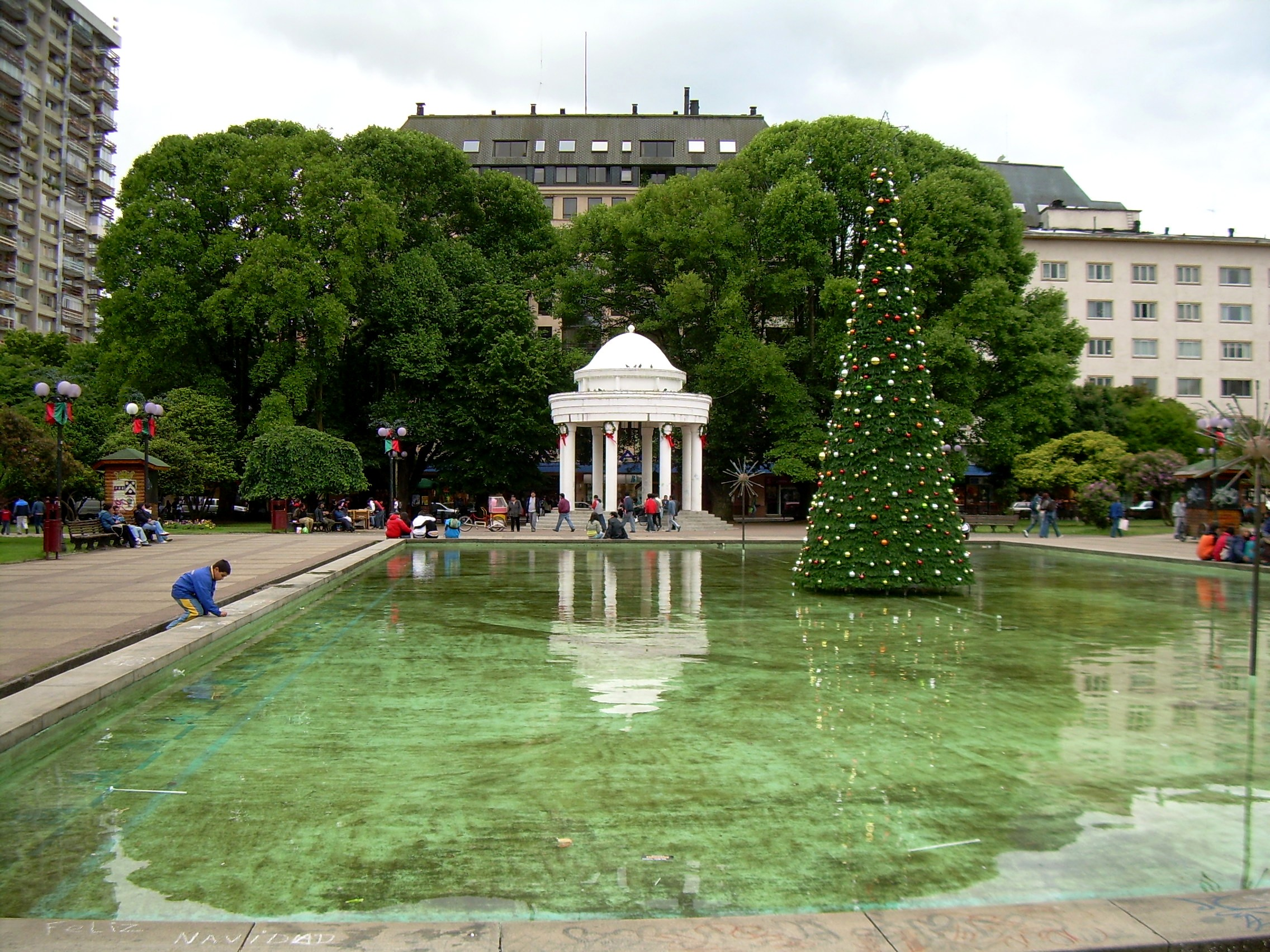
Plaza de Armas

Osorno sits in sight of Volcán Osorno, an active but minor volcano. The city's most prominent geographical feature is the Rahue River that runs north–south through its center. A smaller stream breaks off as well, running east before turning south and giving the city some natural boundaries. Located near the river front on the east side is the city's heart, the Plaza de Armas, a large, one-block park with fountains, benches, and tree-lined avenues. On the park's east side is La Catedral of Saint Matthew, one of the city's major landmarks, notable for its modern architecture. The cathedral serves as mother church of the Catholic Diocese of Osorno. Along the south side is Juan Mackenna Avenue, the city's major city centre street. Other points of interest are the main campus of the Universidad de Los Lagos and the Osorno Rodeo Stadium. The recently opened casino Plaza Sol de los Lagos is a new popular attraction for tourists and locals alike.

Osorno hosts a number of annual celebrations. The Festival de la Carne y la Leche (Milk and Meat Festival) is a music festival held annually in late January, features performances by national music pop singers and bands. The Festival del Folklore Campesino (Country Folk Festival) held annually in mid-January, features performances of regional music folk artists.

Another celebration is the Feria Ganadera Sago Fisur (Sago-Fisur Cattle Fair) held annually in early November, hosted by the largest ranch in the area highlights the current state of agricultural activity. Fireworks displays are held every year around the city on 18 September, the Chilean national Day, commemorating independence from Spain.

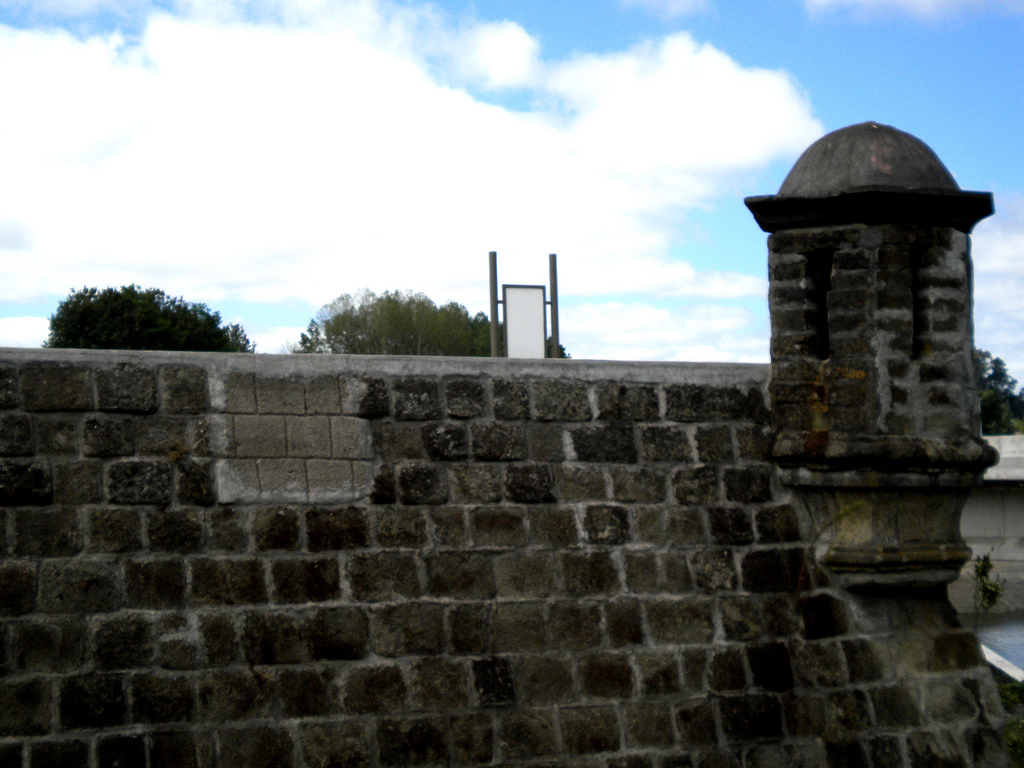
Fort Reina Luisa: it was designed and built by the Captain of the Royal Engineers Manuel Olaguer Feliú.

Osorno is also a gateway for many tourist attractions. Puyehue National Park is a major attraction, with pristine lakes, forests, and game preserves. The volcanic area provides natural hot springs, now the site of the Aguas Calientes spa. Puyehue Hot Springs is adjacent to the park.

Los Lagos Region was named for the many lakes in the area, many of which have tourist-friendly yet isolated beaches; closest to Osorno are Puyehue and Rupanco. Antillanca ski resort, less than a hundred kilometers away, is one of the highest-quality resorts in Chile. Ecotourism is also encouraged by the indigenous Huilliche communities, who inhabit the Pacific coastal zone. Much of the funds brought in by tourism is being used to protect native plant and tree species, most notably the Alerce, a threatened Cypress. The thick forests open onto a number of beaches and bays, such as Maicolpué, Bahía Mansa and Pucatrihue.

== Sports ==
Football and basketball are popular sports in the city. Osorno fields a football team, Provincial Osorno, in the third level national football league. Provincial Osorno plays home games at the Estadio Ruben Marcos Peralta, which has a seating capacity of 10,000.

Osorno's professional basketball team in the top level National Basketball League is called Español de Osorno. Their home games are held at the Gimnasio María Gallardo, which has a seating capacity of almost 4,500.

Chilean rodeo is popular in Osorno, as it is in most of the center-south zone of the country. Osorno's rodeo stadium, the Medialuna de Osorno, is considered one of the best in the country, and was the qualifying arena for the southern region of the national rodeo in 2006.

Boxing is also one of the city's pastimes; Osorno produced Chile's boxing representative at the 1972 Summer Olympics, Martín Vargas. Additionally, the mountainous terrain surrounding Osorno is used for skiing and snowboarding, sports popularized by the large tide of German immigrants. It is the closest city to the Antillanca ski resort, only 98 km away.

== Economy ==
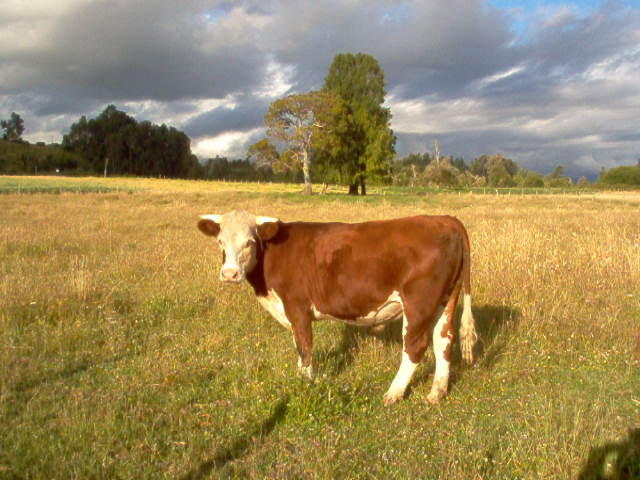
Cattle grazing outside Osorno.

Osorno is an important agricultural center, and agriculture makes up the bulk of the Osorno province's economic activity. Wheat and oats grow abundantly, but the land is also well-suited to the breeding of Chilean horses and cattle. Some of Chile's finest beef products originate in the Osorno ranches.

Osorno's proximity to the Cardenal Antonio Samoré Pass makes it a key place the national economy. The mountain pass connects Osorno to the Argentine city of Bariloche, and is one of primary arteries that ties the two countries' southern regions together. The pass is particularly important due to the fact that it crosses the Andes mountains at very low altitude, allowing it to remain open even when other passes are blocked by snow.

Despite all this, Osorno has seen some economic stagnation in the past several decades. Agriculture alone has not allowed it to keep pace with the booming, rapidly industrializing Chilean economy; Osorno lacks both industrial and information-services sectors. In one effort to combat this, the city has forged international business ties with several Dutch companies, after it was discovered that the local climate is ideal for the growing of tulips. Likewise, Osorno has recently entered the international meat market. Besides offering high-quality beef, the isolated region is also completely free of the recent rash of cattle plagues such as Mad Cow and foot-and-mouth disease, guaranteeing the safety of Chilean meats.

The arable land in Osorno is suited for growing beets, soy, and corn, Crops are rising in popularity with the recent development of biocombustibles: fuels derived from crops, such as corn-derived ethanol. It is hoped that the Chilean government announce that it will not apply the same steep taxes to agricultural fuels as it does to petroleum products, as well as that the increasing demand for more environment-friendly fuels will mean that Osorno will again become a major economic hub.

As Chile continues to develop as one of South America's economic leaders and one of the most stable states in the region, tourism is on the rise.

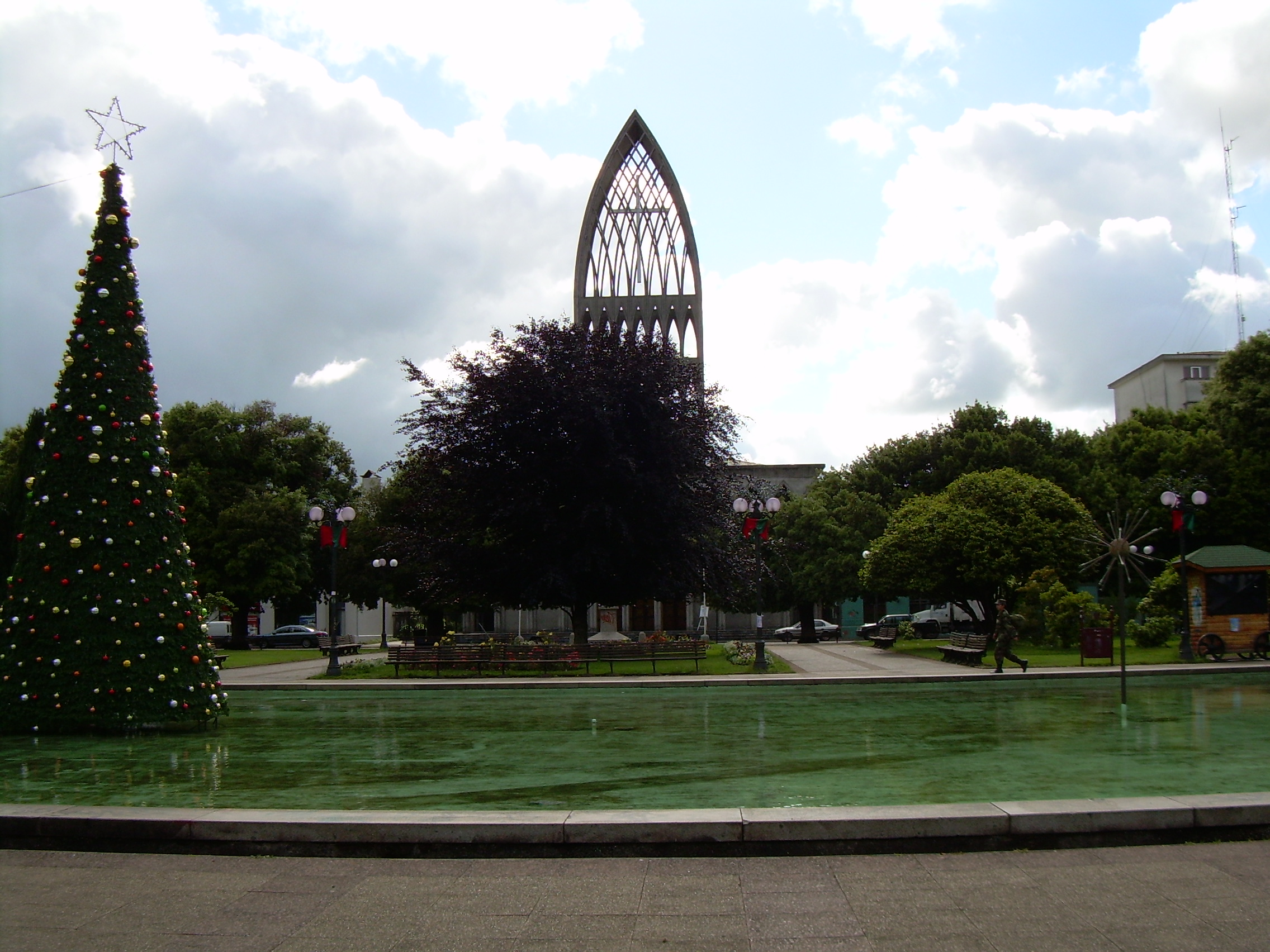
Osorno's Main Square and Cathedral

== Transportation ==
The city is served by Canal Bajo Carlos Hott Siebert Airport, which offers 2-hour flights to Santiago. Buses also depart for the capital daily. The Cardenal Antonio Samoré Pass also marks the city as a major gateway to and from Argentina.

== Education ==
International schools

- Lycée Claude Gay
- Instituto Alemán de Osorno

== Religion ==
St. Matthew's Cathedral, Osorno, located in the city of Osorno, is the mother church of the Roman Catholic Diocese of Osorno.

== Demographics ==
Historical population
Year	Pop.	±% p.a.
1875	12,566	—
1885	16,815	+2.96%
1895	21,674	+2.57%
1907	29,099	+2.49%
1920	34,507	+1.32%
1930	48,750	+3.52%
1940	62,106	+2.45%
1952	75,210	+1.61%
1970	84,130	+0.62%
1982	110,994	+2.34%
1992	127,769	+1.42%
2002	145,475	+1.31%
2017	161,460	+0.70%
2024	166,455	+0.44%
Source: "Censo de Población y Vivienda". National Statistics Institute.

According to the 2002 census of the National Statistics Institute, Osorno spans an area of 951.3 km^{2} (367 sq mi) and has 145,475 inhabitants (70,743 men and 74,732 women). Of these, 132,245 (90.9%) lived in urban areas and 13,230 (9.1%) in rural areas. The population grew by 13.9% (17,706 persons) between the 1992 and 2002 censuses.

=== Notable residents ===
- Tomás Burgos, Philanthropist
- Adolfo Matthei, Agricultural engineer. Founder local agricultural school.
- Luis "Colin" Ramirez, Singer, Musician, Actor.
- Eleuterio Ramírez, Chilean Army officer during de Pacific War against Perú and Bolivia. Also called Hero of Tarapacá.
- Martín Vargas, Olympic boxer
- Juan Mackenna, Governor of Osorno, hero of Chilean independence.
- Pablo Longueira, politician
- Erik Carrasco, professional basketball player
- Iris Sanguesa, composer
- Klaus von Storch, first Chilean astronaut trainee
- Alexis Caiguan, member of the Chilean Constitutional Convention
- Beatriz Hevia, public official

== Administration ==
As a commune, Osorno is a third-level administrative division of Chile administered by a municipal council, headed by an alcalde who is directly elected every four years. The 2008-2012 alcalde is Jaime Alberto Bertin Valenzuela.

Within the electoral divisions of Chile, Osorno is represented in the Chamber of Deputies by Fidel Espinoza (PS), Javier Hernández (UDI), Harry Jürgensen (RN) and Emilia Nuyado (PS) as part of the 25th electoral district. The commune is represented in the Senate by Rabindranath Quinteros Lara (PS) and Iván Alejandro Moreira Barros (UDI) as part of the 17th senatorial constituency (Los Lagos Region).

== Gallery ==
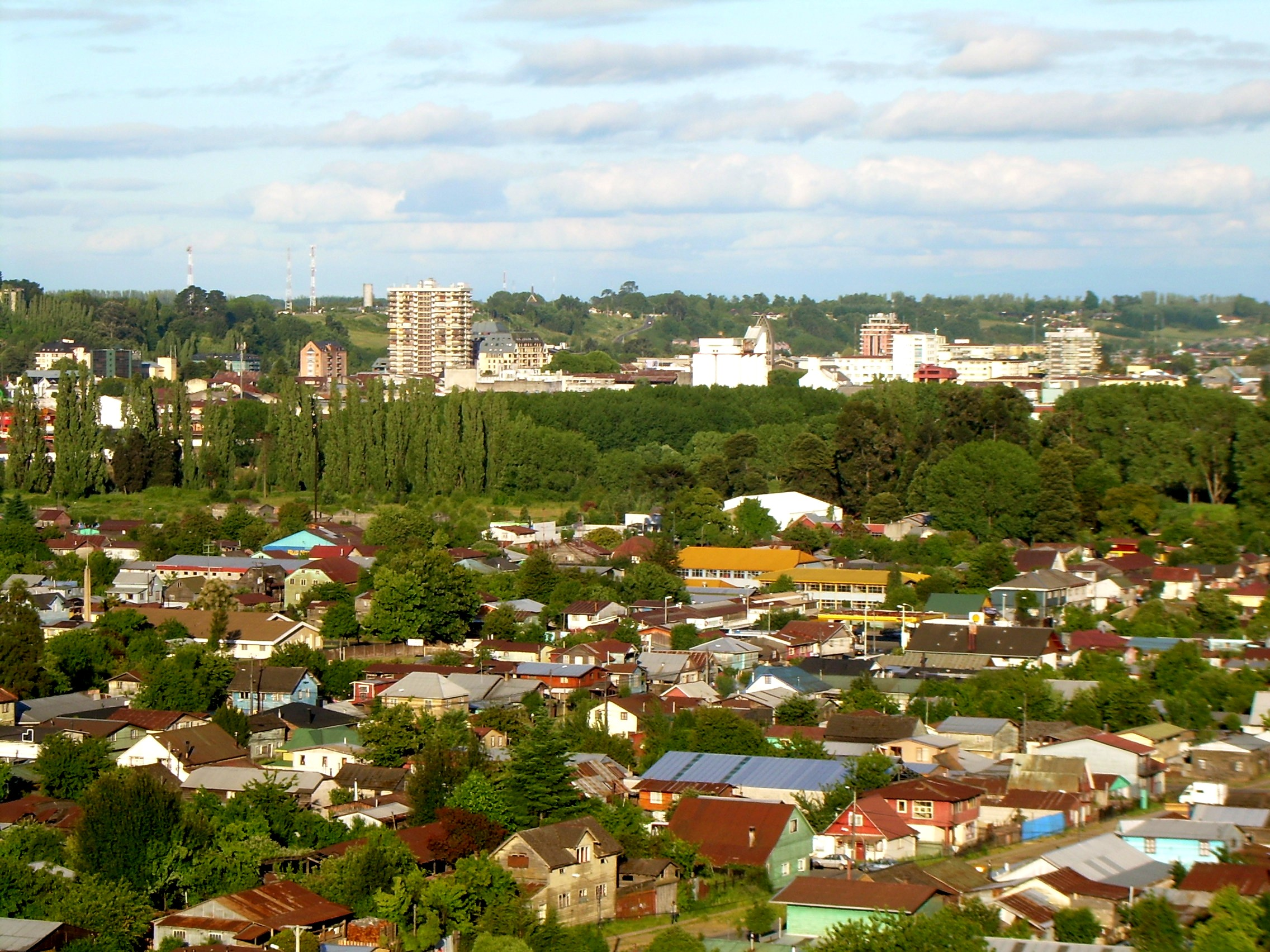
Osorno neighbourhood from a viewpoint

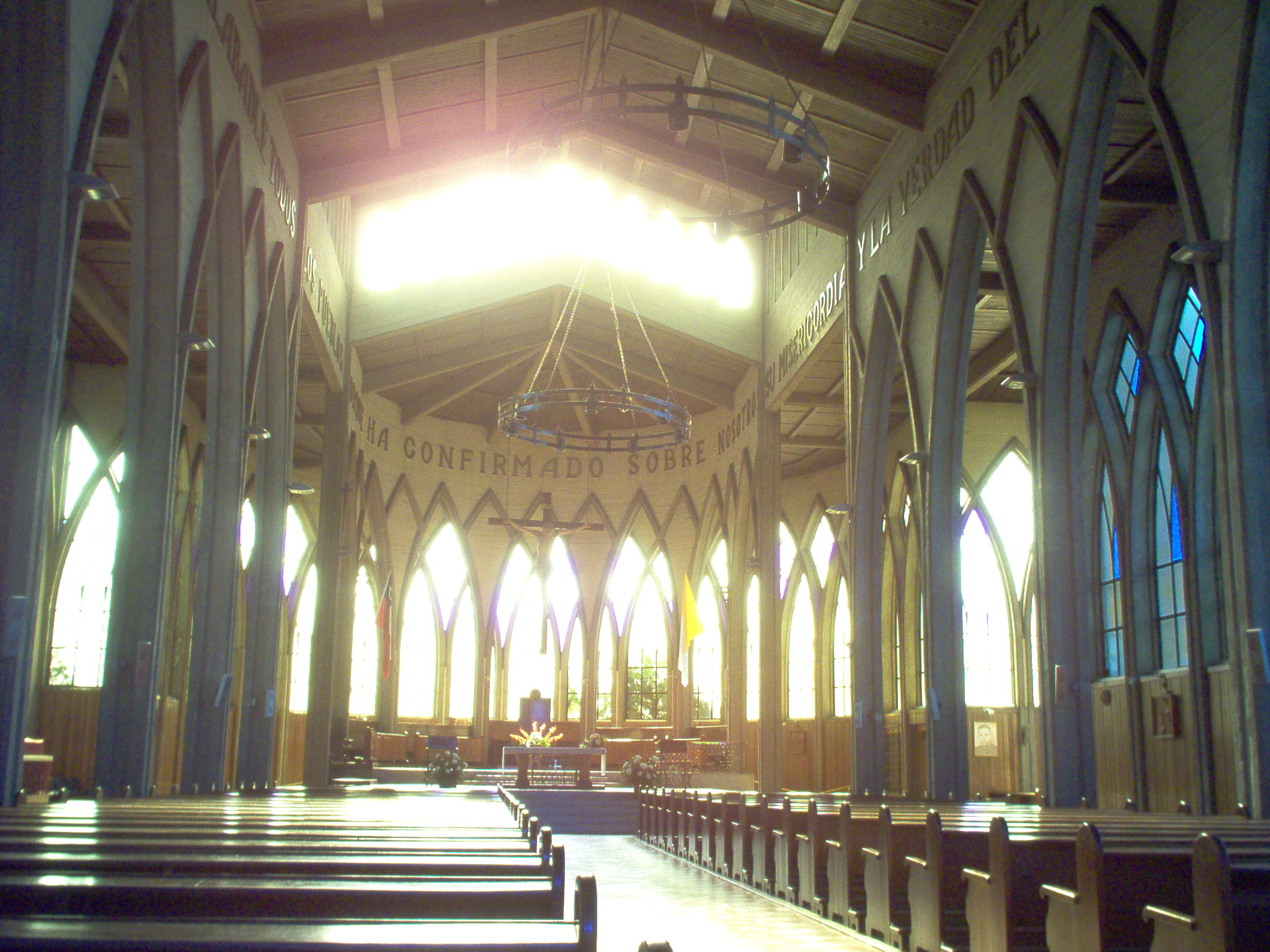
Catedral de San Mateo

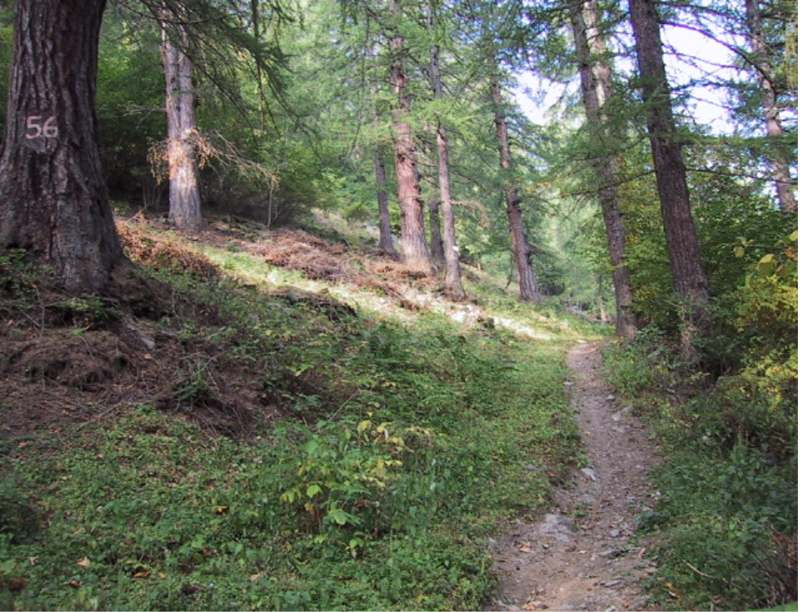
Forest near Osorno

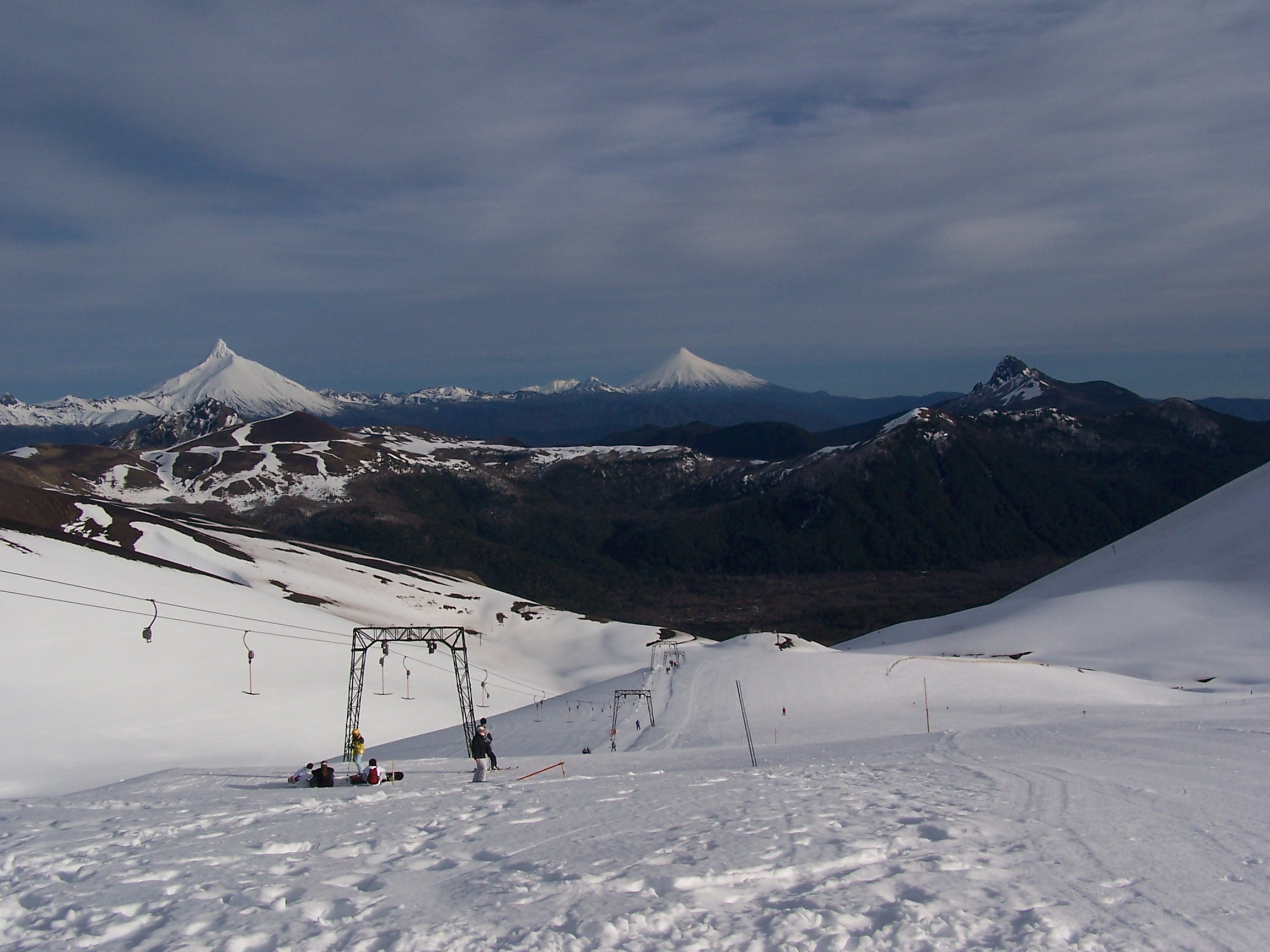
Antillanca Ski Resort

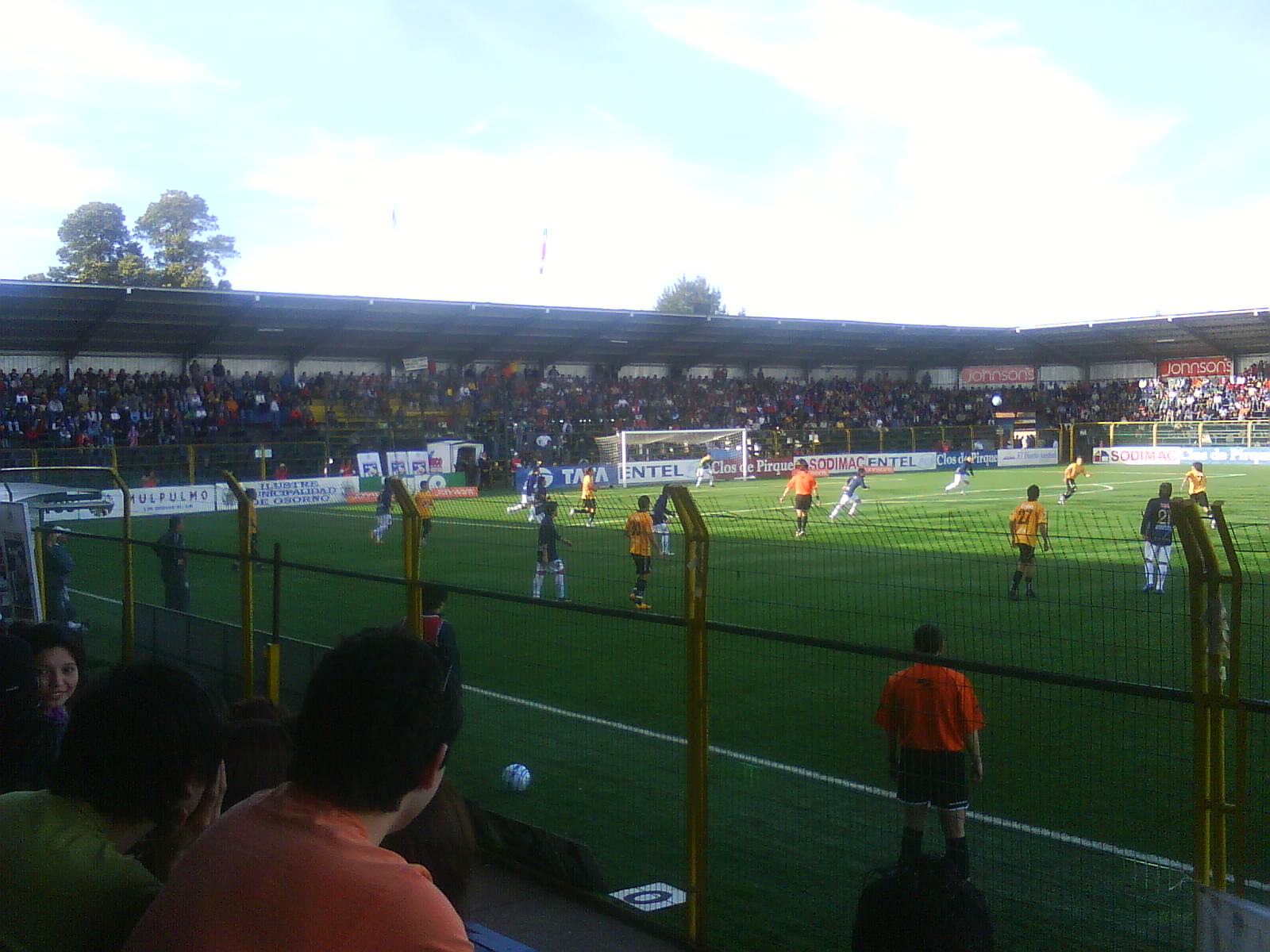
Estadio Ruben Marcos Peralta
