= Ruperto Valderrama =

Chilean rodeo rider (1930–2021)

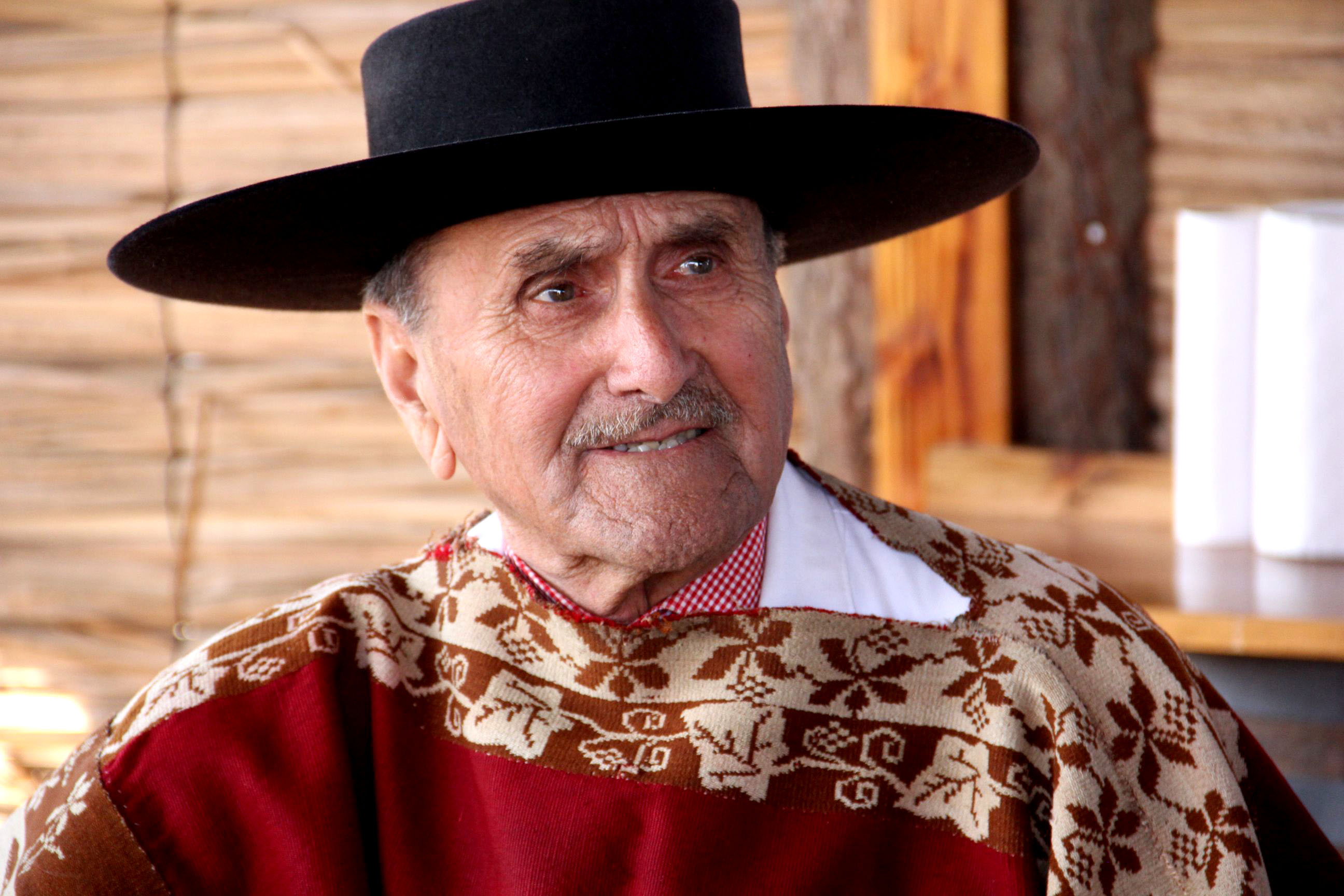

Personal information
- Full name: Ruperto Valderrama Miranda
- Nickname: Don Rupa The Pelé of the croissants
- Born: April 17, 1930 San Fernando, Chile
- Died: June 5, 2021 (aged 91) San Fernando

Sport
- Sport: Rodeo

Ruperto Valderrama Miranda (April 17, 1930 – June 5, 2021) was a Chilean rodeo rider.

== Biography ==
Many Chilean rodeo experts have classified him as one of the best riders in history, and in the 1960s he was known as "The Pelé of the Medialunas." He was an illustrious citizen of San Fernando.

In San Bernardo in 1940, together with Ramón Álvarez, he won his first championship; that triumph marked him for the rest of his life, as he never got off his horses again. He won the National Rodeo Championship five times, along with Ramón Cardemil, who was his partner for twenty-one years, and won four bronze condors as best athlete.

He is also considered the greatest horse setter in history, thanks to his five national titles on horses he settered alone. He touted as a unique achievement in Chilean rodeo the fact that he had settered all the champion horses, a feat unprecedented and unmatched in the national sport. His horse "Manicero," along with "Reservado" and "Talento," are the only horses to hold three national championships.

He died on June 5, 2021, at the age of 92.

== National Championships ==
Year	Team	Horses	Score	Association
1962	Ramón Cardemil	"Manicero" and "Matucho"	19	Curicó
1963	Ramón Cardemil	"Envy" and "Venganza"	18	Curicó
1965	Ramón Cardemil	"Manicero" and "Matucho"	22	Curicó
1967	Ramón Cardemil	"Percala" and "Pelotera"	24	Curicó
1968	Ramón Cardemil	"Manicero" and "Trampero"	29	Curicó

=== Third Championships ===
- 1955: with Ramón Cardemil, riding "Sambo" and "Posturita" with 19 points.
