= Ramón Cardemil =

Ramón Cardemil Moraga (17 January 1917 – 8 September 2007) was a Chilean rodeo horse rider, considered one of Chile's best rodeo riders of all time. He and Juan Carlos Loaiza are the riders who have won the most titles (seven each) in the Chilean National Rodeo Championship.

== National Rodeo Championships ==
| Year | Collera (Partner) | Horses | Points | Association |
|---|---|---|---|---|
| 1962 | Ruperto Valderrama | Manicero – Matucho | 19 | Curicó |
| 1963 | Ruperto Valderrama | Envidia – Venganza | 18 | Curicó |
| 1965 | Ruperto Valderrama | Manicero – Matucho | 22 | Curicó |
| 1967 | Ruperto Valderrama | Percala – Pelotera | 24 | Curicó |
| 1968 | Ruperto Valderrama | Manicero Trampero | 29 | Curicó |
| 1973 | Manuel Fuentes | Tabacón – Trampero | 22 | Curicó |
| 1981 | Manuel Fuentes | Bellaco – Rival | 22 | Curicó |

== Biography ==
Cardemil was born in Ranguilí, a town in the province of Colchagua, previously the province of Curicó, and was the sixth child of Ramon Cardemil Vallejos and Hortensia Moraga.

From early childhood, Cardemil showed interest in horses. His father gave him a pony which he named 'Steel.' As a result of the Cardemils' economic hardship, Ramon had to drop out of school and ultimately give up his dream of going to college to study law. He moved to Curicó and began working in the cattle market. Afterwards, he relocated to Santa Cruz and rode in local rodeos along with his brother, Guillermo Cardemil.

When Cardemil was 15 years old, he was sent to live with this uncle Abraham Cardemil Vallejos in Santiago, Chile and continued to study; first in the Valentin Letelier school and finishing in the academy of humanities of Los Padres Dominicos. He dreamt of studying law, however, his passion for rodeo was greater and he returned to Curico and focused on cattle work.

Ramón Cardemil rode in rodeos for many years with numerous wins and losses, however, the 1960s was his golden age. He won five championships with his partner Ruperto Valderrama and later two more titles with Manuel Fuentes doing collera. These achievements made him a part of rodeo history in Chile.

== Marriage and Children ==
In 1954 Cardemil married Elba Muñoz, with whom he had four children, one who later became Representative Alberto Cardemil. Additionally, Cardemil had 12 grandchildren and two great-grandchildren. He was known for being a simple and happy man, similar to the majority of Huaso Chilean countrymen. He founded the Santa Elba Stable, which even today, is one of the most well-known, award-winning stables in Chile. In the farming world, Cardemil was respectfully known as 'On Ramo.'

== Beginning of his Rodeo career ==
After getting married, Cardemil's wife encouraged him to buy a horse with his savings so that she could properly attend rodeos. For 10 thousand pesos, he bought a horse named 'Kaput' from Pedro Cabrera. This horse earned the first victory of what would become a long and unending series of triumphs.

For many years he fulfilled the requirements needed to qualify for the Chilean Championship, but he didn't own horses, so he did not feel that he was properly qualified to compete with the professional jockeys. In 1951 he achieved qualification to compete in the National Championship, but again did not participate due to lack of preparation and instead attended as a spectator. This happened again in Chillán in 1952 and in Los Andes in 1954. In the following years, he had finally gained the necessary experience and he started to compete in the national championships.

== Championships ==
In the mid-1950s he began to excel at rodeos and in 1955 was qualified for the Championship of Chile with Ruperto Valderrama, at which they placed third. The following year he ran against Ramón González on ´Kaput´, and participated in the fourth round, but could not defeat the champions Abelino Mora and Eliseo Calderon on ´Cervecero´ and ´Latosito´.

The following Chilean championships in Curicó, Osorno, Melipilla, and Maipú were proof of his efforts and improvements as a rider, always with one or more horses fighting neck and neck for first place at the end of each race.

== First place at 1962 National Championships ==
The 1962 National Championship was held in Los Angeles, Chile. Rodolfo Bustos and Segundo Zúñiga were the crowd favorites as they had already won local rodeos in Los Angeles. At that time Cardemil and his teammate Ruperto Valderrama participated, riding ´Matucho´ and ´Manicero.´

Against all odds, they won with a total of 19 points, leaving Oscar Bustamente and Julio Bustamente in second place, and in third place Francisco Romo and Sergio Romo. Rodolfo Bustos and Segundo Zúñiga didn't make it into the top three and the public strongly applauded the champions who had taken their first of five national championships together.

== See also ==
- Huaso
- Chilean Horse
