= Rupanco Lake =

Lake in Chile

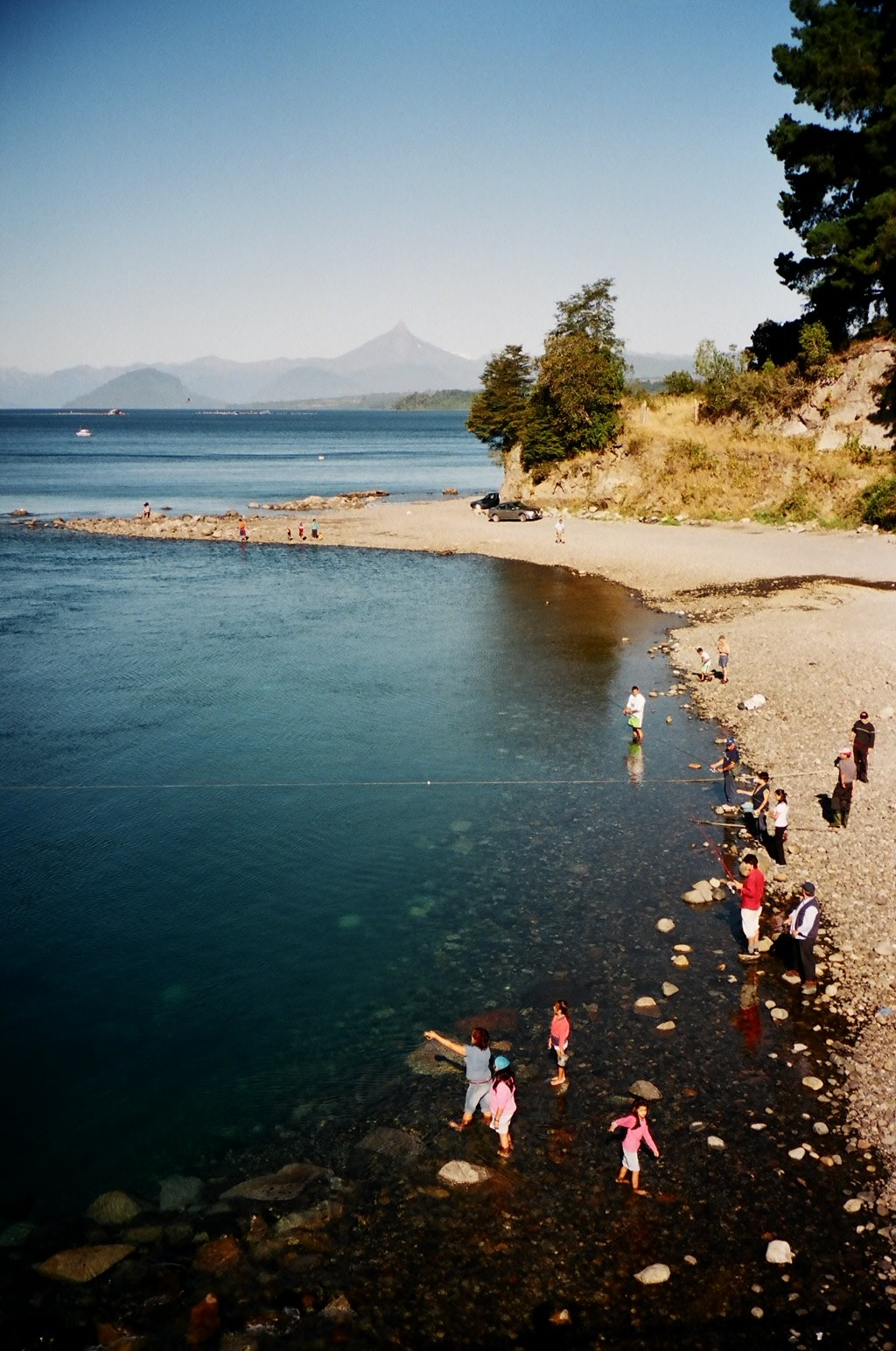

- Location within Los Lagos
- Location: Osorno Province
- Coordinates: 40°49′20″S 72°28′40″W
- Primary outflows: Rahue River
- Catchment area: 9,994 km^{2} (3,859 sq mi)
- Basin countries: Chile
- Max. length: 45 km (28 mi)
- Max. width: 11 km (6.8 mi)
- Surface area: 235 km^{2} (91 sq mi)
- Average depth: 163 m (535 ft)
- Max. depth: 274 m (899 ft)
- Water volume: 38.31 km^{3} (9.19 cu mi)
- Surface elevation: 118 m (387 ft)

Rupanco Lake is located in Los Lagos Region of Chile. The closest city, Osorno, has a primary school named after it as well.
