= Rahue River =

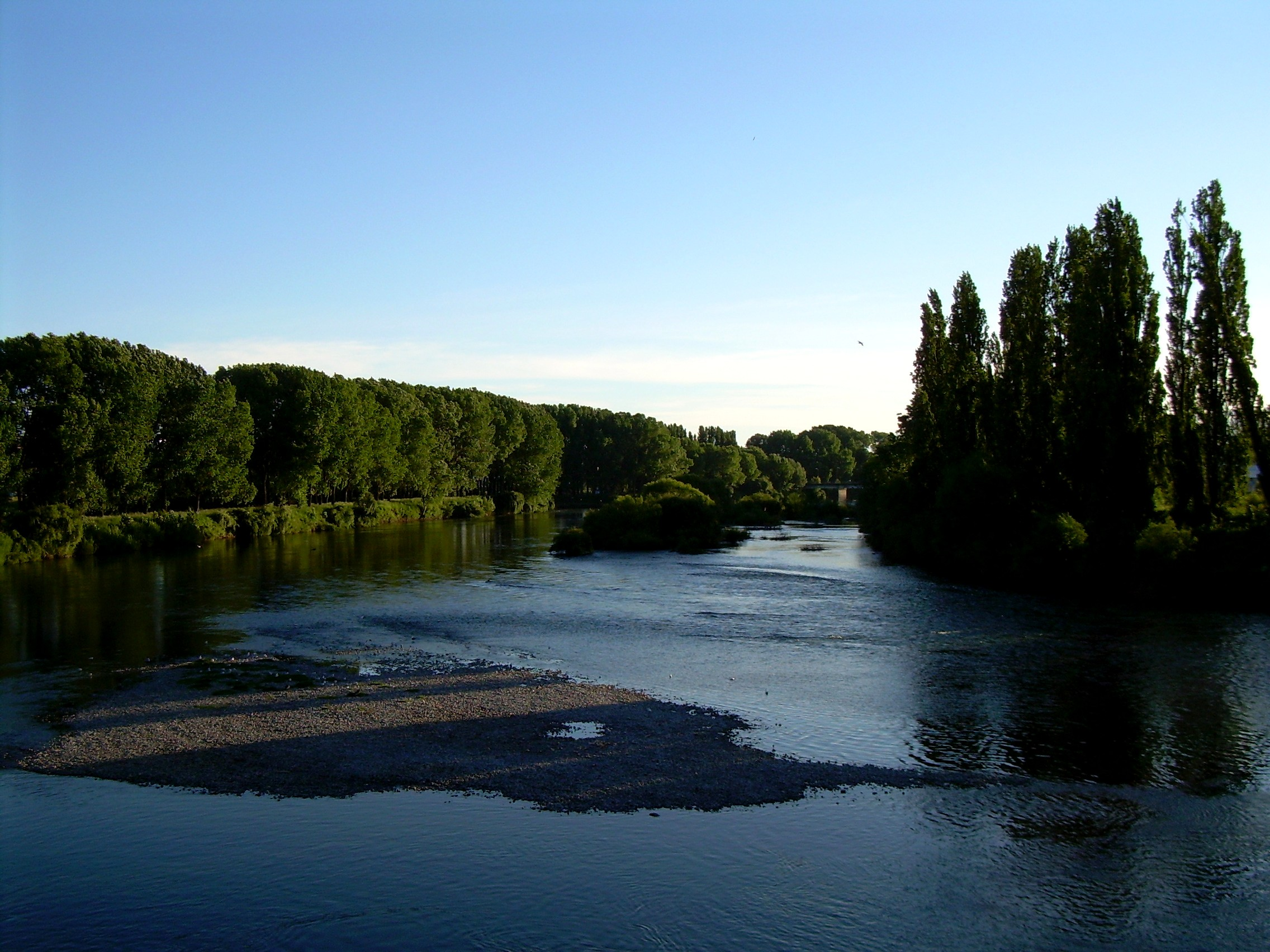

Location
- Country: Chile

Physical characteristics
- Source: Rupanco Lake
  - elevation: 141 m (463 ft)
- Mouth
  - location: Bueno River
  - coordinates: 40°20′22″S 73°18′56″W
- Length: 120 km (75 mi)

Rahue River (Spanish pronunciation: [ˈrawe]) is a river of Chile located in Los Lagos Region. It rises at the western end of the Rupanco Lake. In its middle course, the river flows through the city of Osorno in a north-south direction. Rahue river empties into the Bueno River 40 km inland from the Pacific Ocean.

== See also ==
- List of rivers of Chile
