= Huaso =

Chilean countryman and skilled horseman

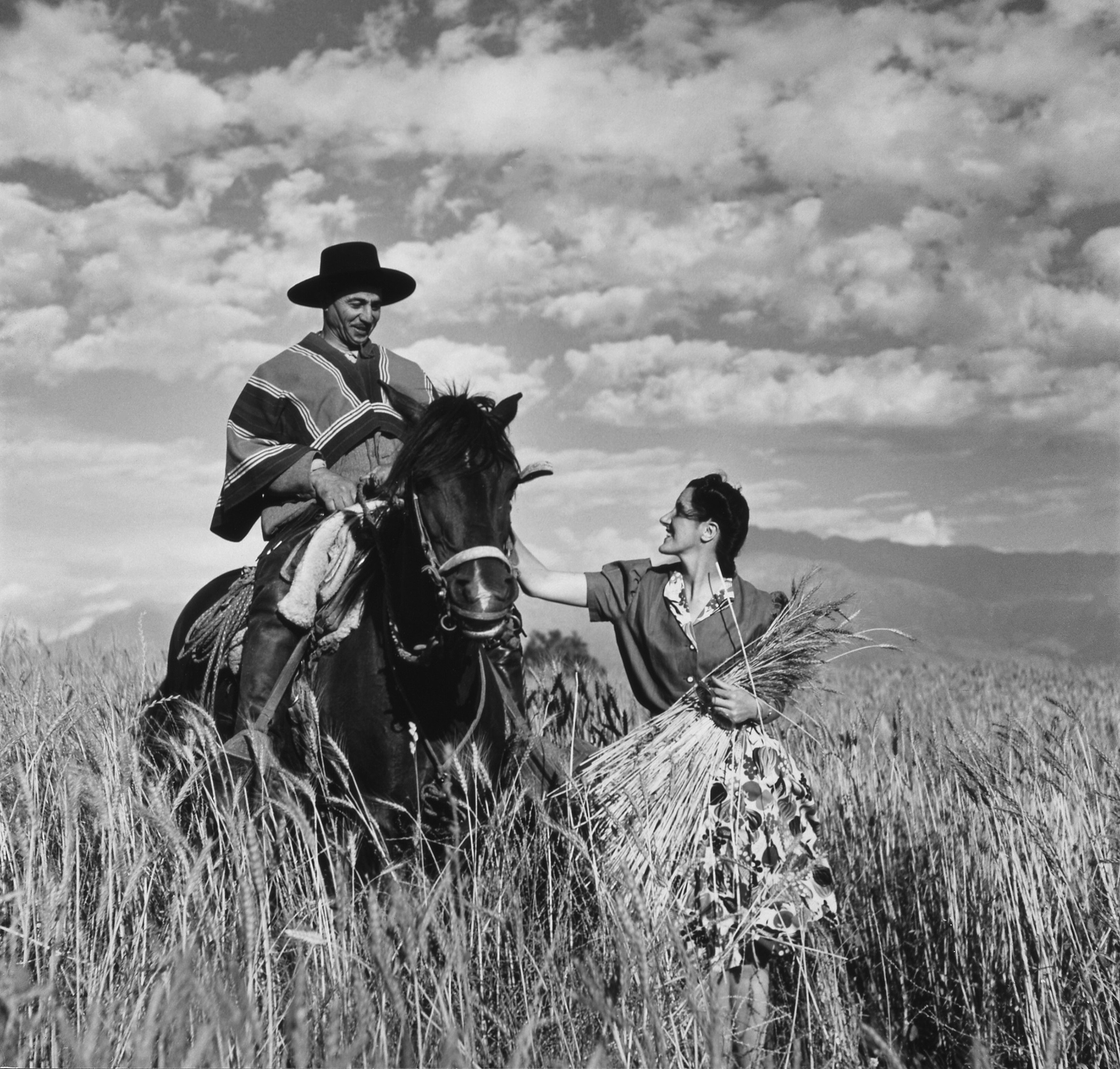
Huaso in a Chilean wheat field, 1940

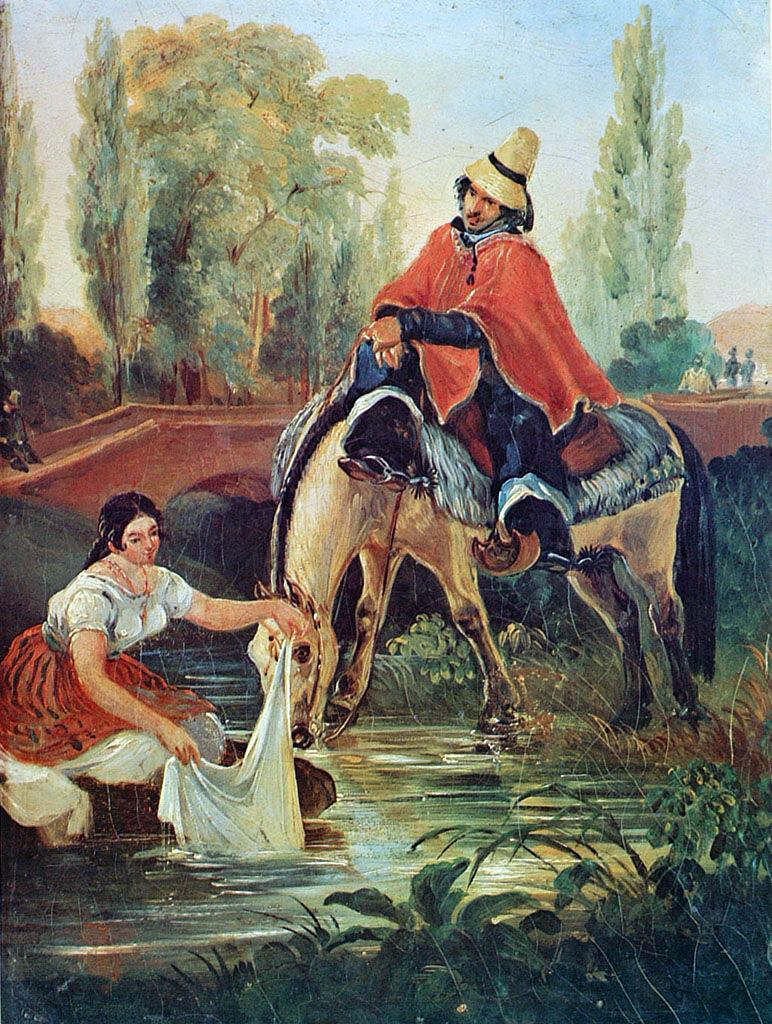
"The Huaso and the Washerwoman" by Mauricio Rugendas (1835).

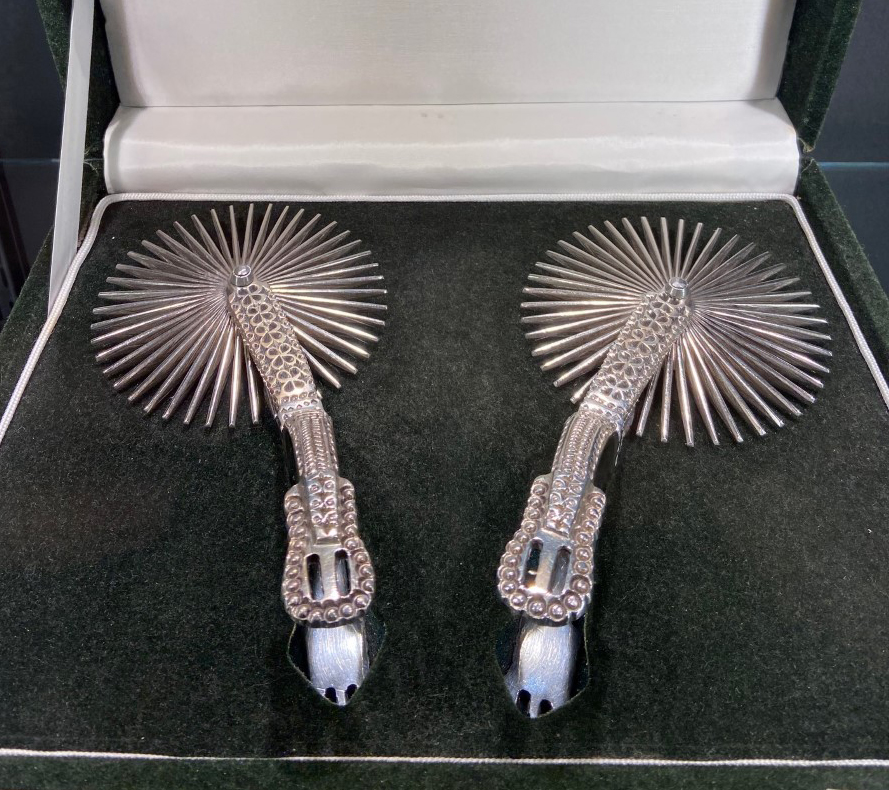
Espuelas, or silvered steel spurs, of a Chilean huaso

A huaso (Spanish pronunciation: [ˈ(g)waso]) is a Chilean countryman and skilled horseman, similar to the American cowboy, the Mexican charro (and its northern equivalent, the vaquero), the gaucho of Argentina, Uruguay and Rio Grande Do Sul, and the Australian stockman. A female huaso is called a huasa, although the term china is far more commonly used for his wife or sweetheart, whose dress can be seen in cueca dancing. Huasos are found all over Central and Southern Chile while the Aysén and Magallanes Region sheep raisers are gauchos. The major difference between the huaso and the gaucho is that huasos are involved in farming as well as cattle herding.

Huasos are generally found in Chile's central valley. They ride horses and typically wear a straw hat called a chupalla. They also wear a poncho—called a manta or a chamanto (although this was originally reserved to land owners, as it is much more expensive)—over a short Andalusian waist jacket, as well as tooled leather legging over booties with raw hide leather spur holders that sustain a long-shanked spur with 4-inch rowels, and many other typical garments.

Huasos are a part of Chilean folkloric culture and are a vital part of parades, fiestas, holidays, and popular music. The dancing of the cueca in which the coy china is courted by the persistent huaso, both traditionally attired, is de rigueur on such occasions.

In Chile, the term huaso or ahuasado (in a huaso way) is also used disparagingly to refer to people without manners or lacking the sophistication of an urbanite, akin to US English redneck.

== Etymology ==
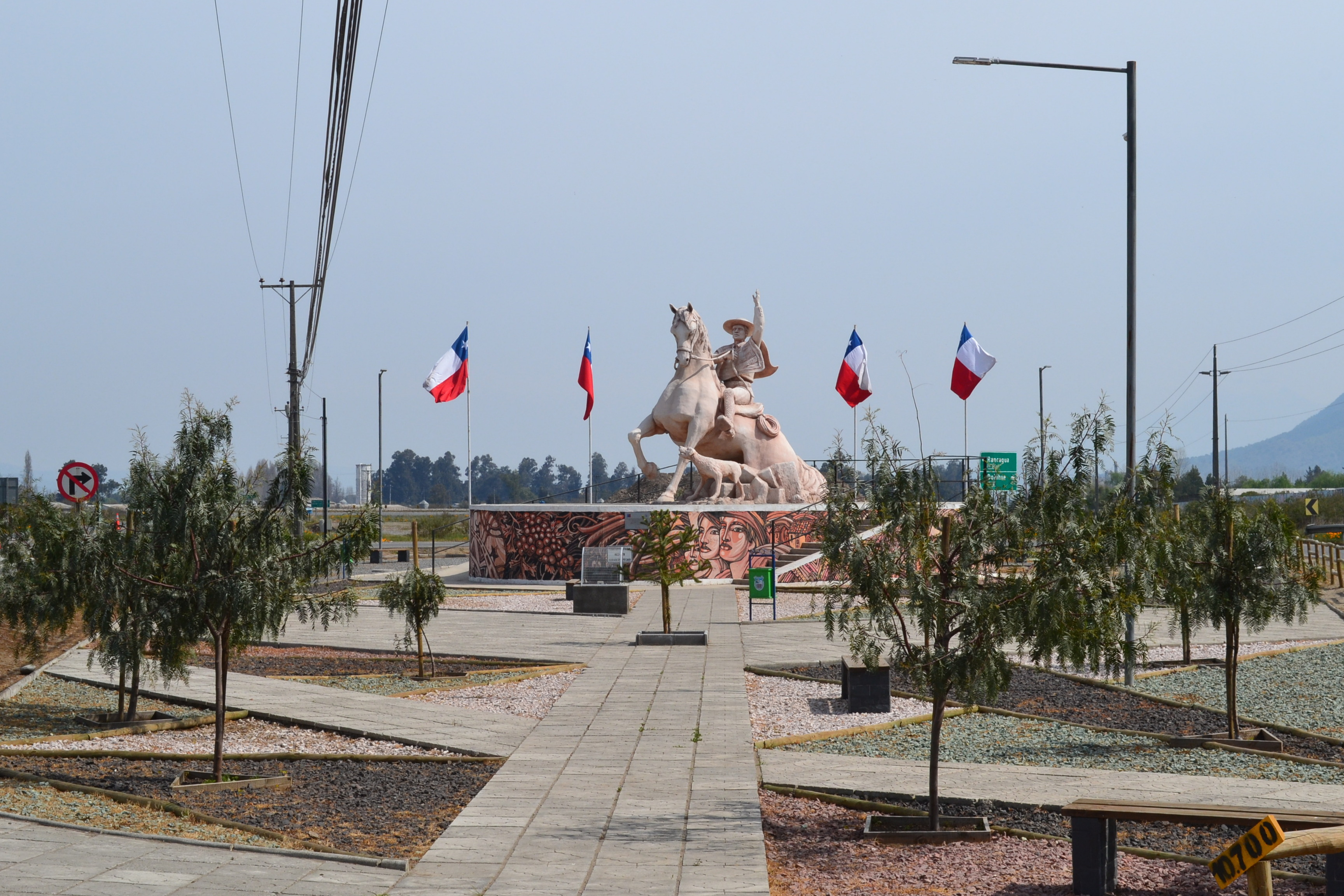
Monument to the Huaso in Lo Miranda, Chile.

Various theories are commonly advanced: from the Quechua wakcha (hispanicized as huacho) meaning orphan, not belonging to a community, hence free and homeless, an important aspect of the huaso/gaucho myth, or alternatively from the Quechua wasu, meaning either the back of an animal, or rough and rustic. Moreover the word guaso/a is used in Andalusian and American Spanish with the last sense.

It appears that a form of folk etymology has operated to conflate the contrasting identities of the huaso, viewed as both a free horseman (implying some wealth and nobility) and an unsophisticated country bumpkin. Both senses can be observed in Chilean usage.

== See also ==
- Banditry in Chile
- Chilean horse
- Chilean rodeo
