= Chilean horse =

Breed of horse

Corralero
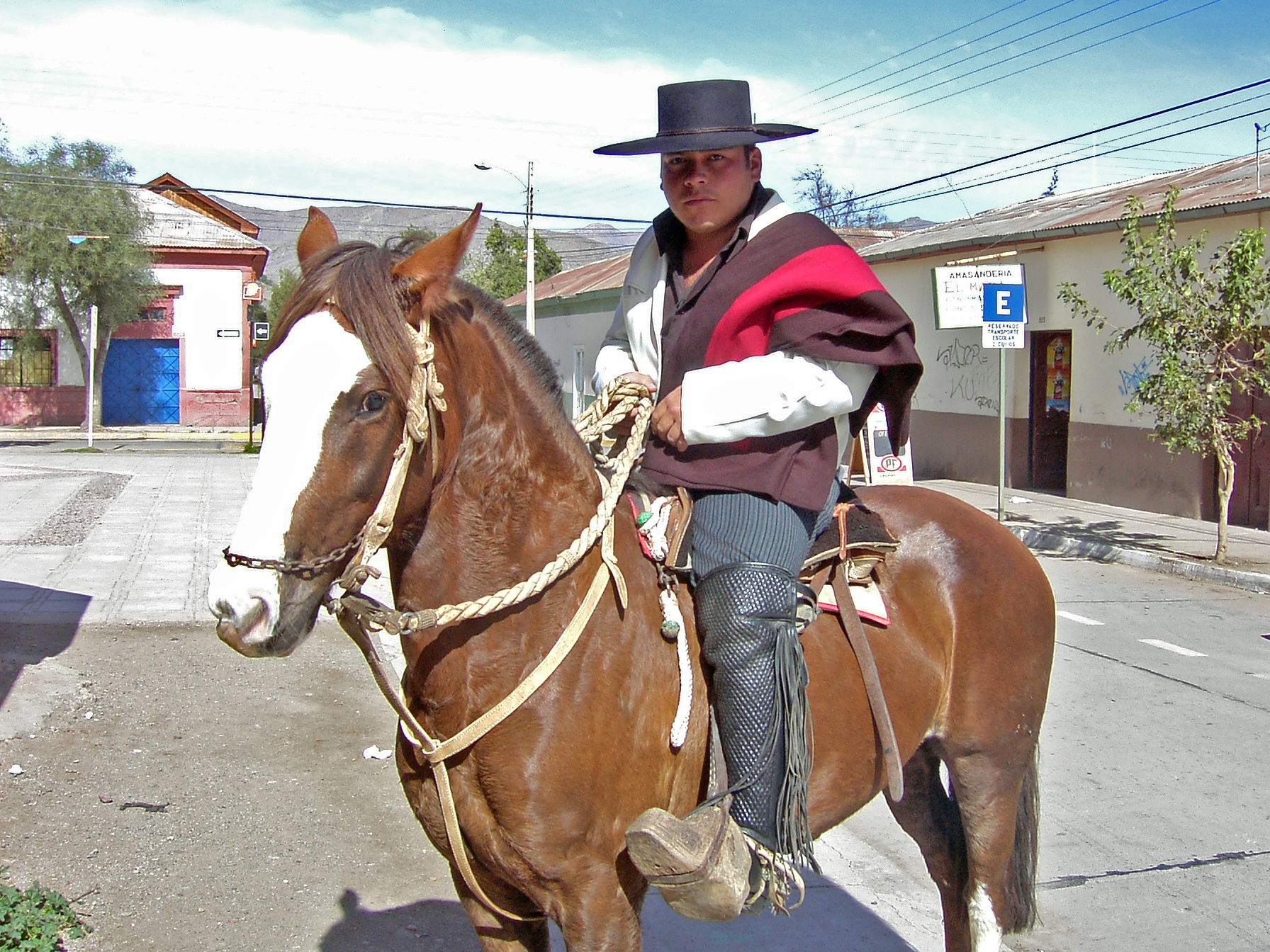
- Conservation status: DAD-IS (2019): not at risk
- Other names: Spanish: Caballo de Pura Raza Chilena; Chilean Horse; Chilean Corralero; Chilean Criollo; Caballo chileno; Chileno
- Country of origin: Chile

Traits
- Weight: Male: average 450 kg; Female: average 425 kg
- Height: Male: average 140 cm; Female: average 138 cm

The Chilean Corralero or Chilean Criollo (Spanish: Caballo de Pura Raza Chilena) is the Chilean national breed of Criollo horse. Like all Criollo horses, it descends from horses brought to the Americas from Spain by the Conquistadors.

It is strongly associated with the huaso or Chilean stock herder, and is much used for working cattle and in Chilean rodeo; it is valued for its cattle sense.

In 2012 it was estimated that there were between 75000 and 85000 Corralero horses in Chile, with some 40000 breeding mares and 3000 stallions.
