= Chilean rodeo =

Traditional equestrian sport in Chile

Points according to where the animal is stopped

Rodeo is a traditional equestrian sport in Chile, declared the national sport in 1962.

Chilean rodeo is different from the rodeo found in North America.

The sport, in its modern form, is strictly regulated. Chilean Horses are used exclusively and riders are required to wear traditional huaso clothing. Rancagua hosts the annual Campeonato Nacional de Rodeo, the nationwide rodeo championship. The greatest rider in the sport's history is considered to be Ramón Cardemil, who won the national title seven times; the last champions were Juan Carlos Loaiza and Eduardo Tamayo Órdenes. Riders practice in the countryside throughout Chile, but the sport is most popular in the central zone. Even so, huasos have been known to travel hundreds of miles to compete in competitions.

In 2004, more spectators attended rodeo events than professional football matches.

Currently, rodeo is one of the most played sports in Chile, some sources argue only second to soccer. The Chilean Rodeo developed in rural areas all over the country, most prominently in the central area, where there is a rural demographic. However, the location of the most notable sites of play, called medialunas, are in large cities in Chile. This shift is because of the expansion of the rodeo in the middle of the twentieth century.

== Description ==
The game consists of a horse collar, composed of two huasos and two horses, who must stop a young bull within three chances to receive different scores.

Rodeos are held inside circular enclosures called rodeo rings. There are two skills in the event. Firstly, cow runs and the movement of the reins, this being the most popular, where the objective is to horse collar – using two huasos (skilled horse riders) mounted on Chilean horses – a herd using a steer of thatch. The second aim is to pass eight equestrian tests.

The highest scoring move is the flank save which earns four points, then the free paddle save which is worth three points, and finally the paddle save which earns two points. Players can have points deducted if the riders cut across or pass the ring.

Currently, the sport is governed by strict regulation that, among other rules, says only registered Chilean horses can compete, ridden by huasos in uniform. The official season begins in September and lasts until April, with around 320 rodeos throughout Chile. The season ends with the National Championship of the Chilean Rodeo, taking place each year in the rodeo ring Medialuna Monumental de Rancagua and attended by the best riders and horses qualifying during the season.

== History ==
The game's origins go back to Imperial Spain's colonial era (1598–1810), as part of traditional Chilean peasant festivals.

=== Establishment ===
The birth of the Chilean Rodeo dates back to the sixteenth century during the rule of Governor García Hurtado de Mendoza, a cavalry officer trained in the play and administration of skill games. He was also an admirer of Moorish equestrian art. In those years the cattle in Chile were not well identified and it was common for them to get lost. To prevent this, Governor Hurtado ordered that every 24 and 25 July, at the feast of the Apostle Santiago, the patron saint of the city, cattle be gathered in what is now known as the Plaza de Armas de Santiago to be selected and sold. In 1557, this rodeo became mandatory, but the date changed to 7 October, San Marcos Day. The goal remained the same, but the work of transferring cattle to different corrals had to be carried out by riders on well-trained horses. The most experienced riders in training or in what is now called the rein movement were rewarded.

In 1860 the medialuna was put in place, similar to the one that is run today, with a ring and two thatches, which is the place where the riders need to stop the cattle. In those days, thirty or more head of cattle were locked up in the ring so that each couple would remove the cattle from their brand with no help other than their skill, a difference from today, when the cattle are in a bullpen and leave the court randomly. The medialuna has a radius of 20 to 25 metres. Previously rodeos were played on a rectangular court that made it difficult to drive the cattle.

At the end of the twentieth century rodeos began to occur regularly. They took place on a rectangular track with a length of 75 metres. The riders removed the cattle from the corrals and in the centre of the track demonstrated their abilities to separate and direct the herd without the help of other riders. All of this action was regimented and the most skillful riders were honoured.

=== Standardisation and regulation ===
During the government of General Carlos Ibáñez del Campo, in 1927, a law was passed regulating the "cattle runs", placing the Chilean rodeo under the supervision of the General Directorate of Equine Development and Remonta of the Chilean Army.

Rodeo became, by law, a national sport on 10 January 1962 by decree Nº269 of the National Council of Sports and the Chilean Olympic Committee. From 22 May 1961, the sport has been regulated by the Federation of Chilean Rodeo. In 1986, the National Federation of Rodeos and Huaso Clubs of Chile (Federación Nacional de Rodeos y Clubes de Huasos de Chile) was founded to regulate, to a certain degree, the "labor rodeos" (rodeo tournaments not recognized by the Olympic Committee).

== Notable riders ==
In 1949 the first National Rodeo Championship took place in Rancagua and the first champions were the riders Ernesto Santos and José Gutiérrez Salgado. The rider with the most victories in the history of the championship is Juan Carlos Loaiza who has won nine national titles, followed by Ramón Cardemil and Eduardo Tamayo Órdenes, with seven championships each.

The champions of the 2018–2019 season were Pablo Aninat and Alfredo Díaz.

Because of the COVID-19 pandemic, the 2020 Rodeo National Championship was postponed.

== Governance ==
The official organization in charge of the Chilean rodeo is the National Sports Federation of the Chilean Rodeo, while the labour organisation is run by the National Federation of Chilean Huasos of Rodeos and Clubs, founded in 1961 and 1986 respectively. The National Championship is held annually in April in "La Monumental Medialuna de Rancagua", the main tournament and stadium, with representation from different parts of the country.

== Funding ==
Although the Chilean rodeo has been declared a national sport, it is in a precarious position in terms of finances, political support and promotion. Part of the reason for this is that the federation does not receive any of the revenue of Instituto Nacional de Deportes de Chile (Chiledeportes) like the rest of sports federations in Chile. This is because only sports that represent Chile overseas receive funds. The Chilean Rodeo Federation has been critical of the government for the lack of funds towards the sport, arguing that because in many parts of the country, due to the distance from population centres, sporting events do not take place, the local population turns to the rodeo as their primary pastime throughout Chilean countryside.

== Criticism ==
Animal rights organizations object to Chilean Rodeo and refuse to call it "sport". The arguments against this activity are related to the treatment the animals receive: the calf is driven near a wall and suddenly is hit by the horse's chest (a charge) in order to stop him. This occurs several times, although the calf is rarely injured or unwilling to stand up. There are constant inspections of the calf during the event to ensure that it is fit to continue.

In 2006, a group of 40 people protested against Chilean rodeo outside Medialuna de Rancagua where the Campeonato Nacional de Rodeo (National Championship of Chilean Rodeo) was taking place.

In 2010, a group of activists entered a medialuna in the middle of a rodeo to protest, and were violently repressed by the huasos taking part in the event. A 17-year-old girl was lassoed and dragged out of the medialuna. The rider in question was criticized for said action by the head of the Federación Nacional de Clubes de Huasos, Ricardo Sandoval, who suggested he be barred from competing.

Since then, other organisations have sought a ban on Chilean rodeo. This is similar to the 2010 ban on Spanish bullfighting in Catalonia, Spain.

== Traditions ==
The rodeo is not only a sporting event but also a party where friends and family gather. Normally, it is held on the weekend and includes activities such as craft fairs, horse shows, Chilean Creole games, and Chilean-style races.

A ramanda, or tavern, is usually where the party takes place. Generally a musical group plays the cueca, a Chilean genre of music, while people dance. People eat typical Chilean foods such as casserole, asado, corn cakes, humitas, empanadas, etc. To drink, the most popular options are pisco, chicha, punch, and chilean wine. Although rodeos are held throughout the year, they most commonly take place during the National Holidays because, over the years, they have become a symbol of Chile.

In every rodeo a queen is chosen. On Saturday the candidates are nominated and on Sunday the winner is chosen. By tradition, the chosen person must dance the cueca with the winners and take a ride on the back of their horse.

== Women's Rodeo Movement ==
For many years the rodeo was exclusively for men. Women participated in the rodeos through administrative roles, but never entered any of the events. This only began to change in the late 1990s when women became able to participate in the Chilean Equestrian Trials (PECH). Later, women continued to protest and demand that they be included in the main rodeo events, creating organisations to fight for these rights.

This led to, in 2003, the Chilean Rodeo Federation allowing women to participate in main events. During the 2005 National Rodeo Championship, the first female national rodeo was held. The event was won by the rider Romané Soto, with 57 points. She has continued to participate in rodeos, but the overall women's performance has not been the best; however, for the 2009 National Rodeo Championships Soto managed to qualify for the final with one horse, "Aviador". The pair went on to win the championship with only 44 points.

Initially the Chilean Rodeo Federation decided against abolishing article 181 that stated that bull riding can only be a men's competition. However, on 12 October 12, 2009, the first promotional women's rodeo was held at the Santa Filomena de Colina arena. More than three thousand spectators and media representatives attended; there were thirty women competitors. On Chile's 200th anniversary, Article 181 was abolished by President Sebastián Piñera and women were allowed to compete in federated rodeos under the same conditions as men. At the 2012 National Rodeo Championship, Michelle Recart became the first woman to qualify for the Champions Series of a National Rodeo.

== Internationalisation ==
During the 1990s rodeo began to spread to Argentina, especially within Mendoza province. In 1993 the first rodeo arena was built in Argentina, in the town Tunuyán. Following this, Argentine riders were invited to participate in the Chilean Rodeo National Championship. In January 2018, an agreement was signed between the Chilean Rodeo Federation and the Cuyo Rodeo Association (Argentine Riders' Association), agreeing that Argentine Cuyo riders and Chilean riders could participate in both Chilean and Argentine sponsored rodeos. Arenas have been constructed in Argentina and the sport is gaining supporters daily. In Argentina the rodeo is known as "rodeo cuyano" and it is distinct from the Chilean rodeo because the riders wear traditional gaucho clothing, which is a typical and historical style of clothing from Argentine rural areas. In Uruguay, interest in rodeos has also grown.

In 2005 the first International Rodeo Championship was held in Argentina and was won by Chilean riders Luis Eduardo Cortés and José Urrutia. That same year, the rider Alfonso Navarro obtained the title of champion in the traditional Gold Brake event which is held in Brazil. The event was and still is attended by representatives of different countries of the Southern Cone and Brazil. The participants compete in different events on Criollo horses.

On 1 May 2009 according to the framework of the Expo FICCC, the most important Criollo horse exhibition in the history of Latin America took place. The rodeo was held in Esteio, Porto Alegre, Brazil. For the event, a new rodeo arena was built in Esteio. The champions were José Astabiriaga and Alfredo Moreno.
