= Aguas Calientes Hot Springs =

- Termas de Aguas Calientes
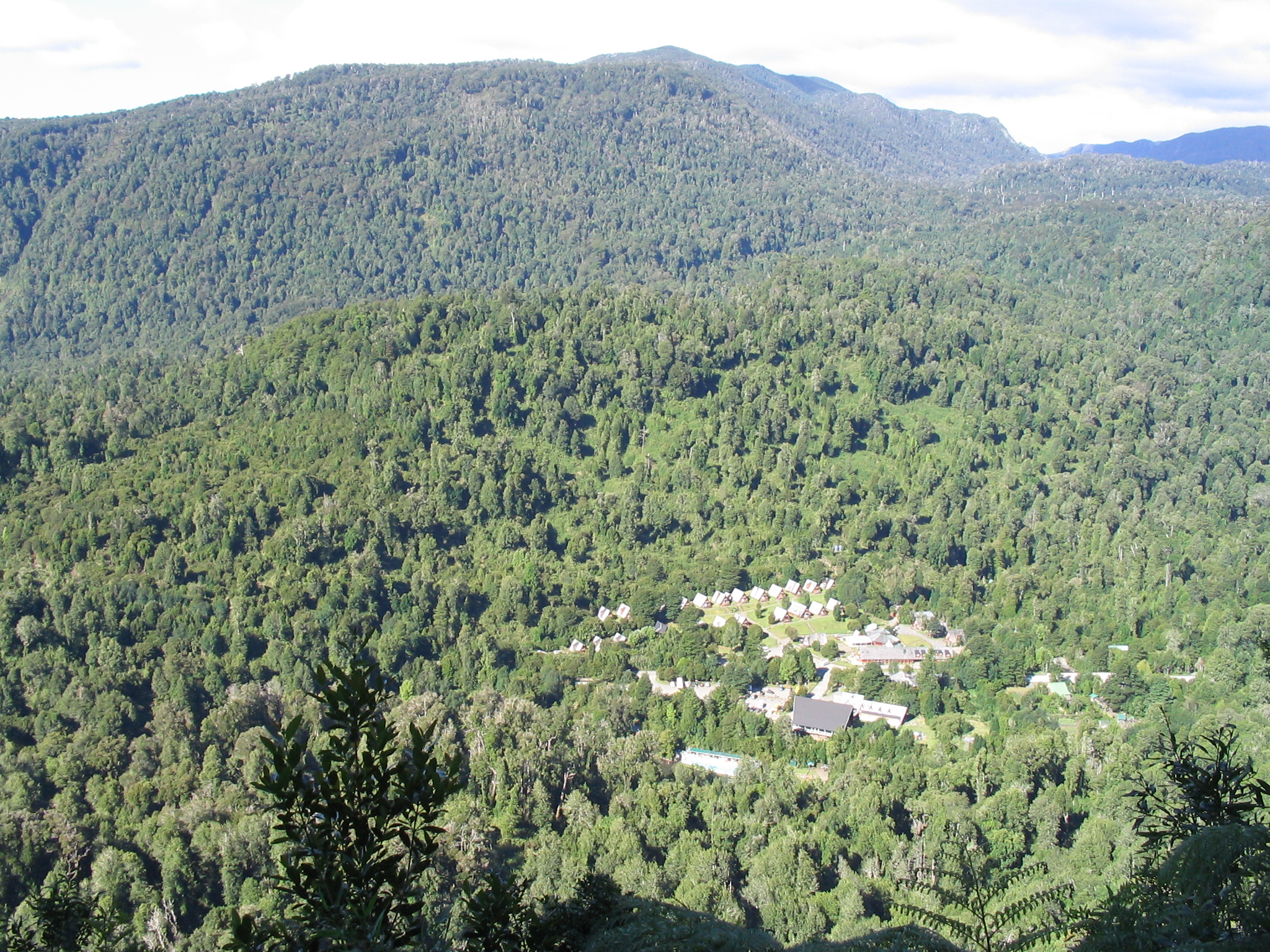
- Aerial view of the building complex at Aguas Calientes

- Location within Chile Location within Los Lagos
- Interactive map of Aguas Calientes Hot Springs
- Location: Los Lagos Region, Chile
- Coordinates: 40°44′07.79″S 72°18′29.12″W
- Elevation: 310 m (1,020 ft)
- Type: Spring
- Frequency: Constant
- Duration: Constant
- Temperature: 41 to 54 °C (106 to 129 °F)

The Aguas Calientes Hot Springs (Spanish: Termas de Aguas Calientes) is a series of hot springs located 76 kilometers near Route 215-CH east of Osorno in the Los Lagos Region of southern Chile.

The area is served by Refugio del Lago Airport.

Nearby attractions include Puyehue Hot Springs and the Antillanca ski resort.

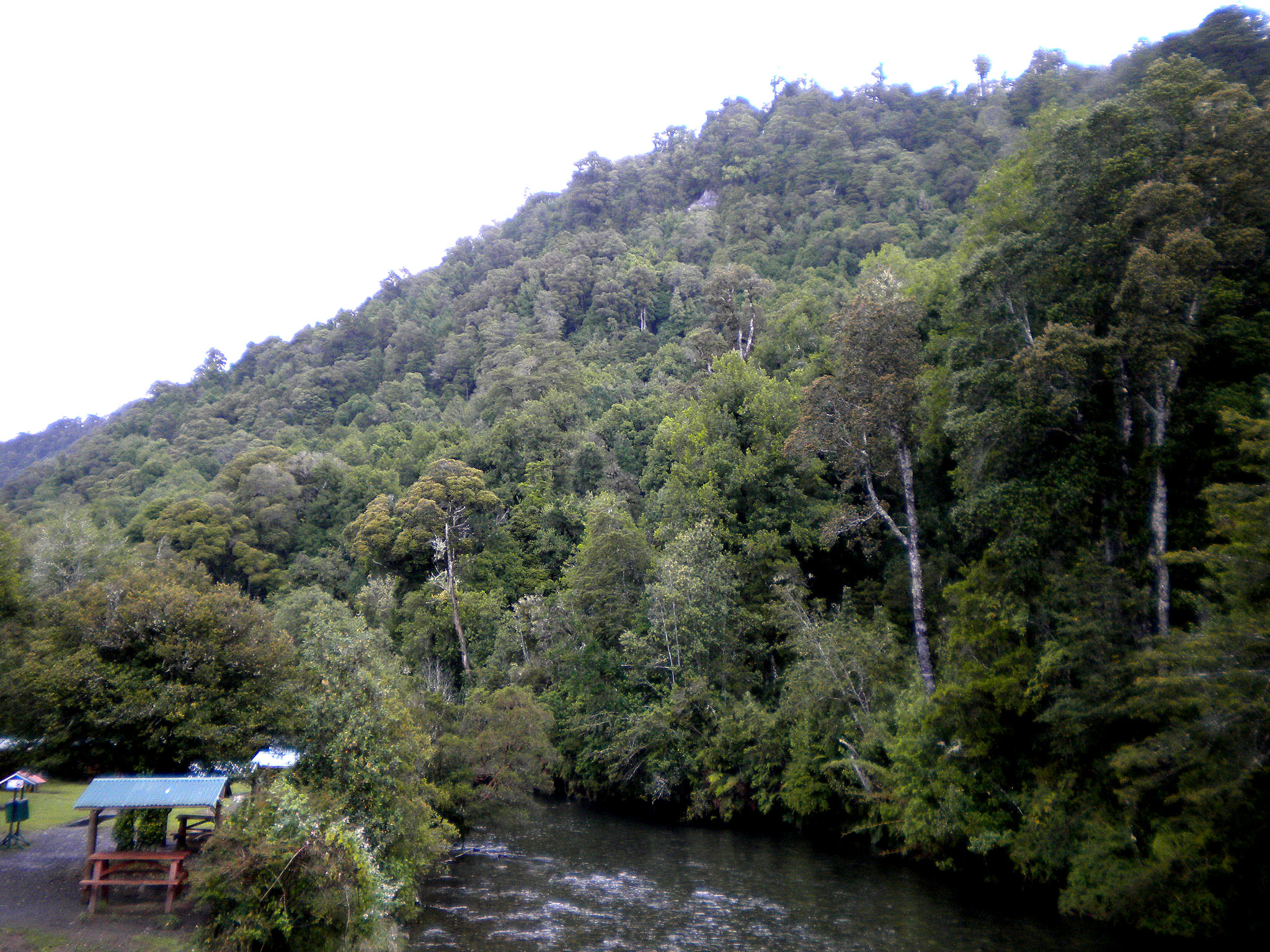
View of the picnic area of Aguas Calientes

== See also ==
- Puyehue National Park
- Osorno Province
- Puyehue Lake
- Puyehue-Cordón Caulle
- Rupanco Lake
