= Puyehue =

Puyehue (Mapudungun: Puye (small fish), hue (place)) may refer to:

- Puyehue Lake
- Puyehue Volcano
- Puyehue National Park
- Cardenal Antonio Samoré Pass formerly known as Puyehue Pass
- Puyehue, Chile a commune in Osorno Province
- Puyehue Hot Springs
