= Antillanca Group =

Mountain in Chile

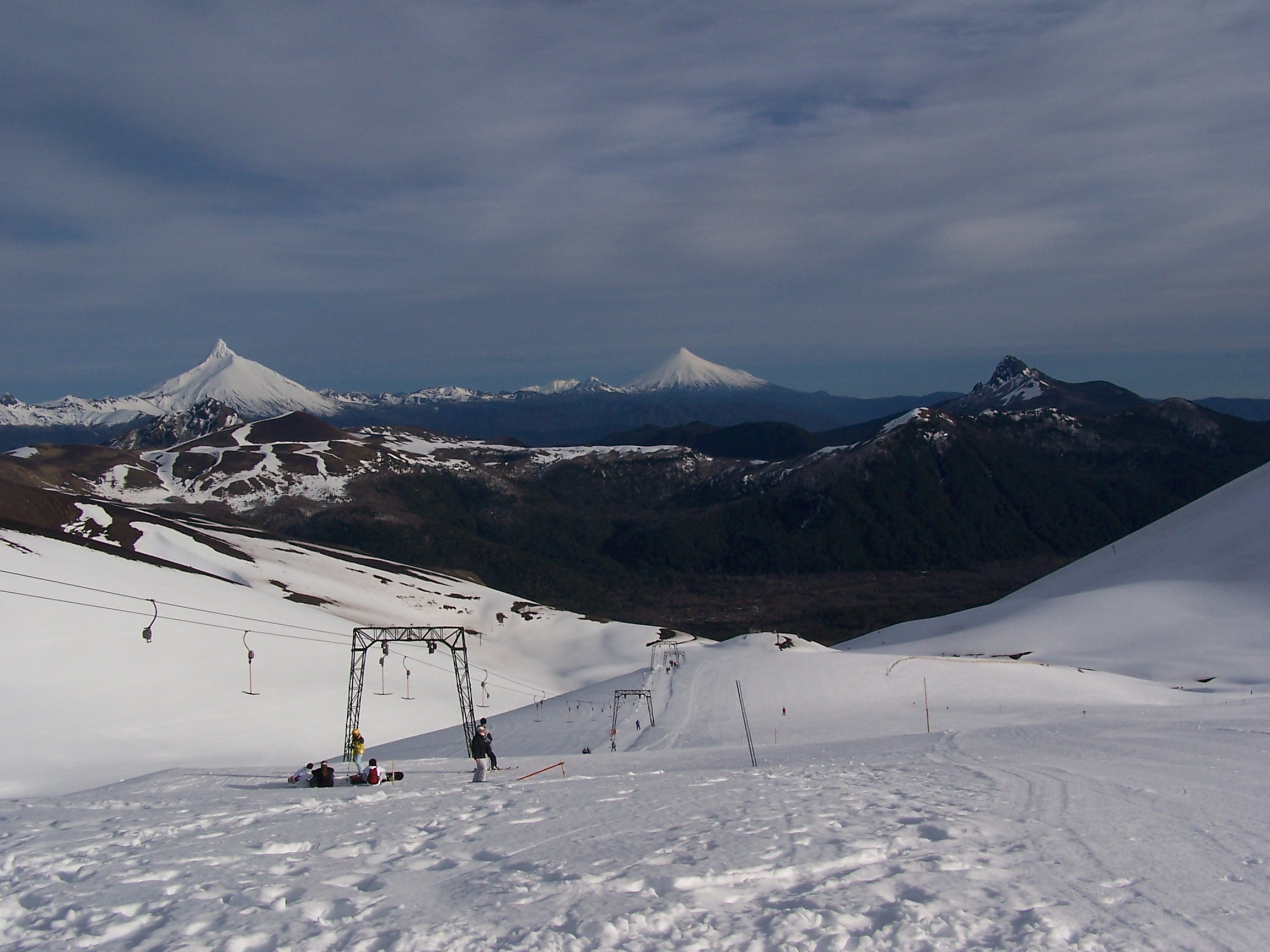
- Antillanca ski resort

Highest point
- Elevation: 1,990 m (6,530 ft)
- Coordinates: 40°46′15″S 72°09′12″W

Geography
- Location within Chile
- Location: Chile
- Parent range: Andes

Geology
- Mountain type: Stratovolcanoes
- Last eruption: 230 BCE ± 200 years

The Antillanca Group is a volcanic group of scoria cones, maars and small stratovolcanoes, in Chile. Casablanca stratovolcano is the tallest volcano of the group, which shelters the Antillanca ski resort on its west flank. Aguas Calientes and Puyehue Hot springs also form part of this volcanic group. The complex encompasses 380 km^{2} and to the west is bordered by the lakes Puyehue and Rupanco.

A great portion of the Antillanca Group lies within Puyehue National Park. The complex is neighbor of the volcanoes Puyehue, Cordón Caulle, Puntiagudo and Osorno.
