= Puyehue Hot Springs =

- Termas de Puyehue
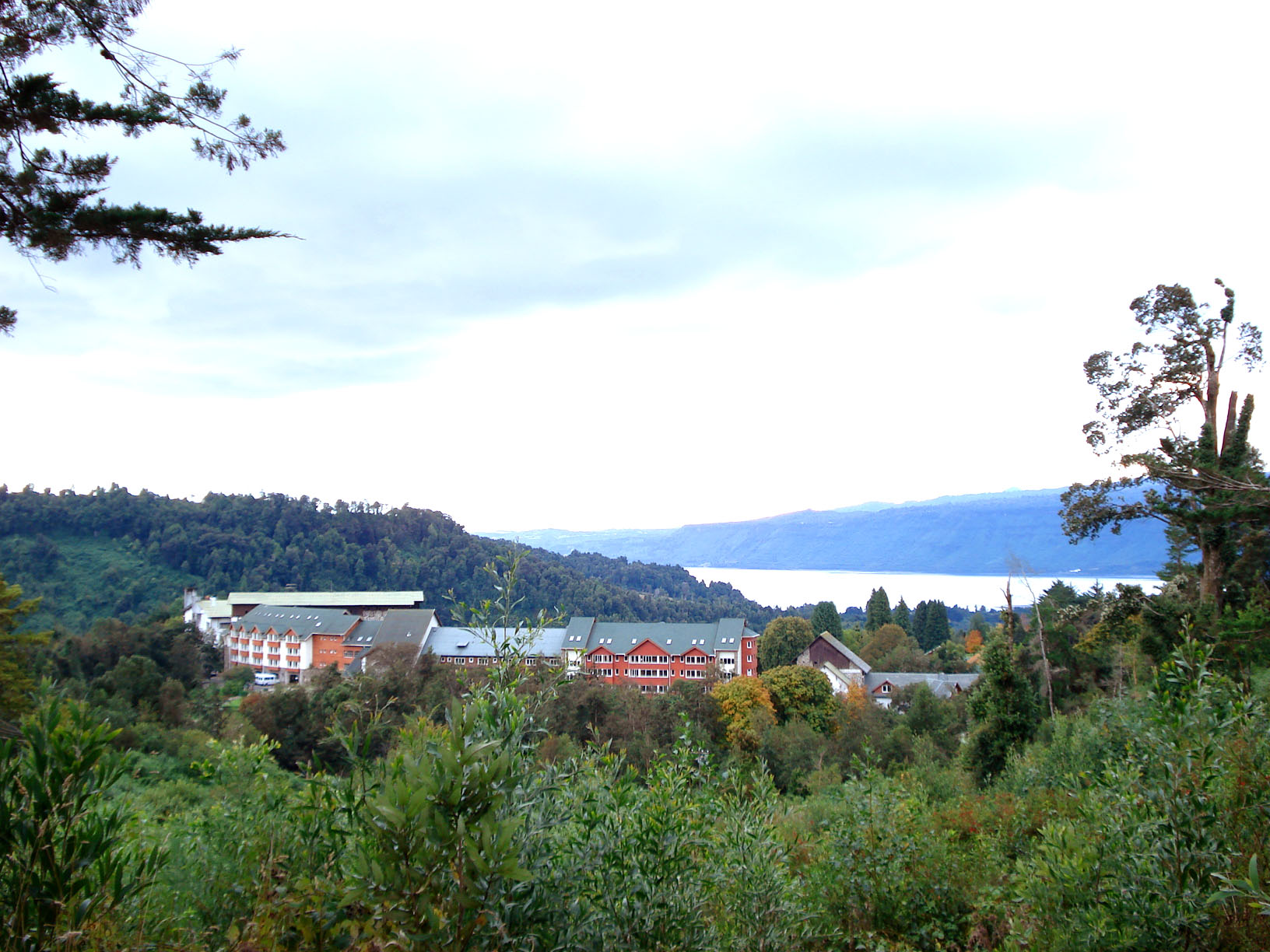
- View of the hotel located in the hot springs in autumn

- Location within Chile Location within Los Lagos
- Location: Los Lagos Region, Chile
- Coordinates: 40°42′43″S 72°19′42″W
- Elevation: 310 m (1,020 ft)
- Type: Spring
- Frequency: Constant
- Duration: Constant
- Temperature: 41 to 54 °C (106 to 129 °F)

The Puyehue Hot Springs (Spanish: Termas de Puyehue) is a series of hot springs located 76 kilometers along Route 215-CH east of Osorno, a city 20 kilometers from Puerto Montt in the Los Lagos Region of southern Chile.

The area is served by Refugio del Lago Airport.

== Description ==
The Puyehue Hot Springs are part of the 117,000 hectares of the Puyehue National Park, a protected area.

The Puyehue Hotel and Spa, where the baths are found, is located 75 kilometers east of Osorno following Route 215-CH, in the foothills of Casablanca Volcano. The baths collect geothermal waters from five different sources with water temperatures ranging from 41 to 54 °C (106 to 129 °F).

Nearby attractions include Aguas Calientes Hot Springs and the Antillanca ski resort.

== History ==
The baths' origins date back to 1907 when a consortium led by Conrado Hubach was formed to improve the facilities at the hot springs. By 1910, a hotel had been built with capacity for 100 guests and an old steamboat transported visitors from the town of El Desague (now known as Entre Lagos) across Puyehue Lake to Puyehue Beach. The steamboat ran for more than 30 years.

In the 1940s, a new hotel, Gran Hotel Puyehue was built over 2.65 hectares to provide more modern facilities.

== Facilities ==
Amenities include indoor and outdoor pools, saunas, hydro massages, and a spa offering a range of services. Other activities include horseback riding, trekking, mountain biking, and ecotourism.

== See also ==
- Puyehue National Park
- Osorno Province
- Los Lagos Region
- Puyehue Lake
- Puyehue-Cordón Caulle
