= 2011–2012 Puyehue-Cordón Caulle eruption =

Volcanic eruption in Chile

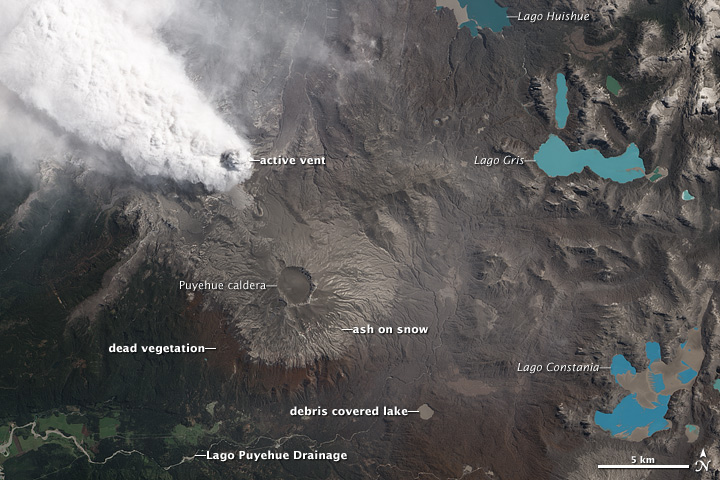
- 2011 eruption of Puyehue-Cordón Caulle
- Volcano: Puyehue-Cordón Caulle
- Start date: 4 June 2011
- End date: 21 April 2012
- Type: Plinian
- Location: Ranco Province, Chile; 40°35′25″S 72°07′02″W
- VEI: 5

The 2011–2012 Puyehue-Cordón Caulle eruption ([puˈʝewe]) was a volcanic eruption that began in the Puyehue-Cordón Caulle volcanic complex in Chile on 4 June 2011. The eruption, which occurred from the Cordón Caulle fissure after 51 years of the volcano being inactive, is one of the largest volcanic eruptions of the 21st century thus far. At least 3,500 people were evacuated from nearby areas, while the ash cloud was blown across cities all around the Southern Hemisphere, including Bariloche, Buenos Aires, Montevideo, Stanley, Porto Alegre, Cape Town, Hobart, Perth, Adelaide, Sydney, Melbourne, Wellington, Auckland and Port Moresby, forcing airlines to cancel hundreds of international and domestic flights and causing travel chaos.

By 18 June the ash cloud had completed its first circle of the globe. The Chilean civil aviation authority said that "the tip of the cloud that has travelled around the world has more or less reached the town of Coyhaique", about 600 kilometres south of the Puyehue-Cordón Caulle. An estimated one hundred million tons of ash, sand and pumice were ejected – requiring power equivalent to 70 Hiroshima atomic bombs.

Cordón Caulle is a volcanic fissure and has erupted many times in recorded history, most recently in 1960, following the 1960 Valdivia earthquake days earlier, whereas the Puyehue stratocone has remained dormant.

== Eruption ==
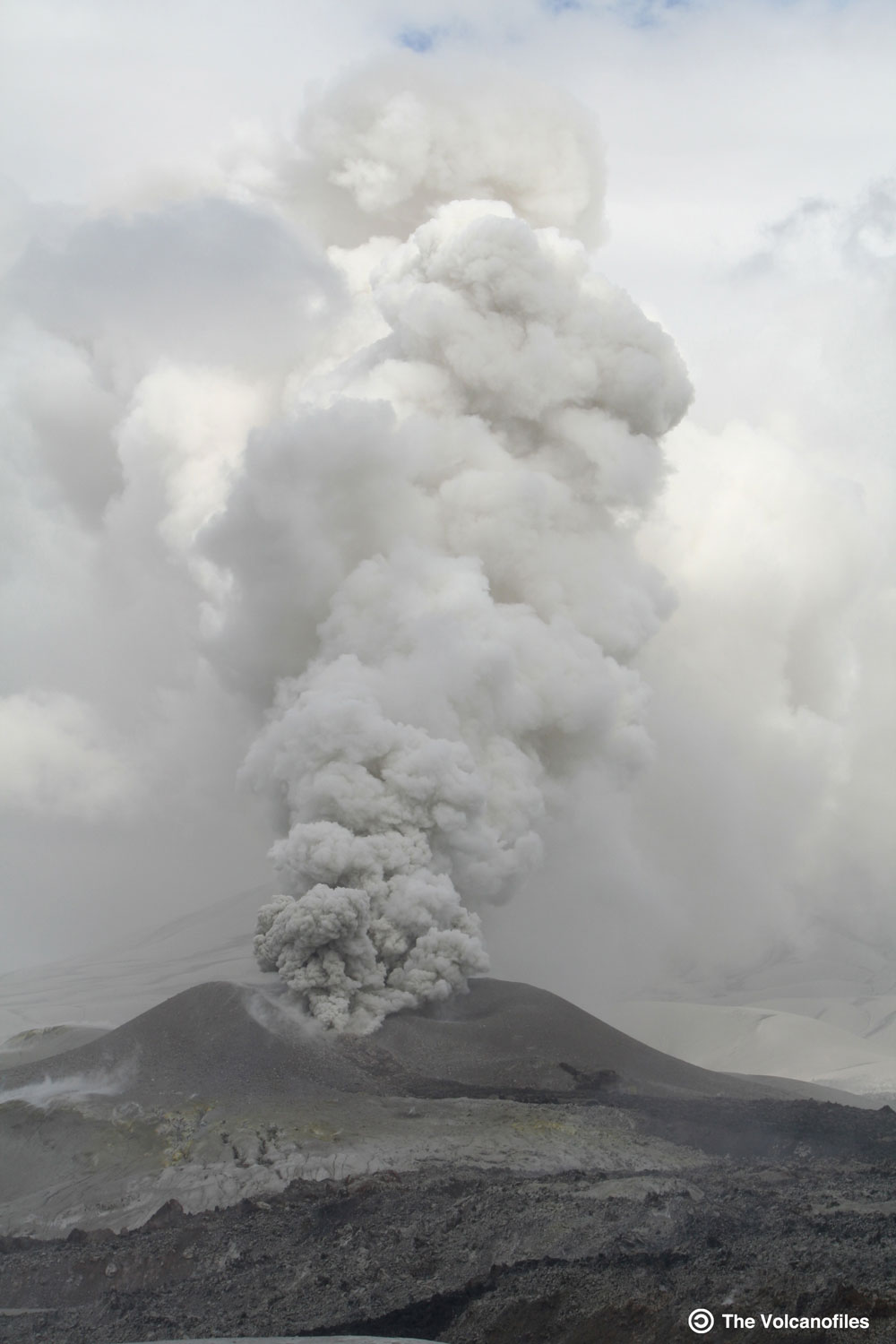
Puyehue Cordon Caulle erupting vent, February 2012

The Southern Andean Volcano Observatory (OVDAS) of Servicio Nacional de Geología y Minería de Chile (SERNAGEOMIN) reported on 27 April 2011, 15:30 local time, an increased seismicity at the Puyehue-Cordón Caulle and set the alert Level to 3, Yellow.

Between 20:00 on 2 June and 19:59 on 3 June, OVDAS reported that about 1,450 earthquakes at Puyehue-Cordón Caulle were detected, or an average of about 60 earthquakes per hour. Scientists and regional authorities flew over the volcano, noting no significant changes. The alert level remained at 3, yellow. Area residents reported feeling earthquakes during the evening of 3 June through the morning of 4 June.

On 4 June, at 11:30 local time, a new round of eruption in the Puyehue volcano began. For a six-hour period on 4 June seismic activity increased to an average of 230 earthquakes per hour, at depths of 1–4 km. About 12 events were magnitudes greater than 4 of Richter magnitude, and 50 events were magnitudes greater than 3. The alert level was raised to 5, red.

At 15:15 local time OVDAS reported an explosion and a 5 kilometres (3.1 mi)-wide ash-and-gas plume that rose to an altitude of 10 kilometres (33,000 ft) above sea level. The plume drifted south at 5 kilometres (16,000 ft) altitude, and southeast and east at 10 kilometres (33,000 ft) altitude. The alert level was raised to 6, red.

18 days after it first erupted, lava begun spilling from the volcano, heading west and flowing "slowly by a channel about 50 meters wide and 100 feet long."

According to Argentine physicists, the eruption sent one hundred million tons of ash, sand and pumice stone, equivalent to the load of 24 million trucks of sand and released power equivalent to 70 Hiroshima atomic bombs (equal to 1000 kilotons of TNT). The eruption, though violent, is expected to fertilize the land and rivers. Evaluation of the total amount of airborne erupted material has proved to be challenging, with estimated values ranging from 0.5 to 1.5 km^{3} (0.12 to 0.36 mi^{3}). A further 0.25 to 0.45 km^{3} (0.060 to 0.108 mi^{3}) of lava were erupted in the months following the first explosions.

=== Evacuation ===
A "red alert" was declared pre-emptively by the National Emergencies' Office (ONEMI) for regions near the volcano: Puyehue, Río Bueno, Futrono, and Lago Ranco; initially 600 persons were evacuated. The "red alert" was later extended for the Los Ríos Region area: the areas of Pocura, Pichico, Los Venados, Contrafuerte, El Zapallo, Futangue, Pitreño, Trahuico, Riñinahue Alto, Ranquil, Chanco, Epulafquén, Las Quemas, Licán, Boqueal, Rucatayo, and Mantilhue were evacuated; and areas in the Los Lagos Region such as El Retiro, Anticura, El Caulle, Forestal Comaco, and Anticura Pajaritos were also evacuated, increasing the number to at least 3,000 total evacuated people. It was reported that, at first, large land- and farm-owners in Chilean rural areas near the volcano did not allow workers to be evacuated. According to Chilean authorities, the evacuated persons "would be relocated in temporary shelters in safe areas." There are no reports of deaths or injuries.

The families who refused to be evacuated from the riverbed of Rio Nilahue were removed by force by the Carabineros de Chile after a resolution of the Appeal Court of Valdivia. It took the police more than 8 hours to evacuate 40 people. People resisted mainly because they had to leave their livestock behind. Small livestock farmers were permitted to check and care for their livestock once a day.

On 17 June 2011 OVDAS reported that the ash-and-gas plume reached 3 kilometres (1.9 mi) above sea level, and the frequency of earthquakes had dropped to 5 per hour. They reduced the alert level from 6 (moderate eruption) to 5 (imminent eruption), and at least 100 evacuated persons were allowed to return home. People from the Northeast side of the Cordón (Nilahue and Gol Gol Valley) will stay in the shelters.

On 19 June the ONEMI decided that all 4,200 evacuees could return home, as the scale of the eruption continued to decrease.

=== Ash cloud over Argentina and Uruguay ===
Topography of the region. The Puyehue-Cordón Caulle massif is located between Ranco and Puyehue Lake

The ash cloud crossed Chile's borders and precipitated over the Argentine cities of Villa la Angostura, Bariloche and the northern part of Chubut province. The eruption was reported to have produced lightning and strong thunderstorms. Argentine Minister of Defense Arturo Puricelli ordered that "the Argentine Army personnel, means of transport, water treatment plants, and other equipment of VI Mountain Brigade in the province of Neuquén" be moved to the affected areas on the Argentine border with Chile.

In Argentina's affected cities, people have been recommended to stay indoors.

On 5 June the ash rain in Bariloche ceased. There were reports that the ash had caused power outages and prompted the local airport to be closed. The Bariloche Atomic Centre reported that the ashes contain no crystal phases of quartz or cristobalite.

On 9 June ash clouds from Puyehue reached Uruguay, forcing most flights to be cancelled. On 11 June the ash clouds reached the southern tip of New Zealand, with unusual sunsets reported in Invercargill.

Further disruption was caused by ash in October 2011, with airports at Mendoza, Bariloche and Buenos Aires closed and flights to Buenos Aires and Montevideo cancelled. This was ash from the earlier eruption which had been deposited across Patagonia and stirred up by high winds. Some areas of Argentina close to the Chilean border still had ash falling almost daily four months after the June eruption.

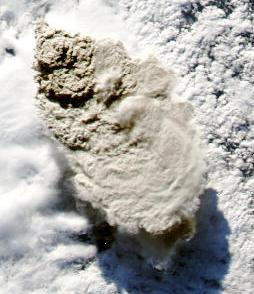
Image from NASA's Aqua satellite showing the heavy ash cloud on 4 June 2011.

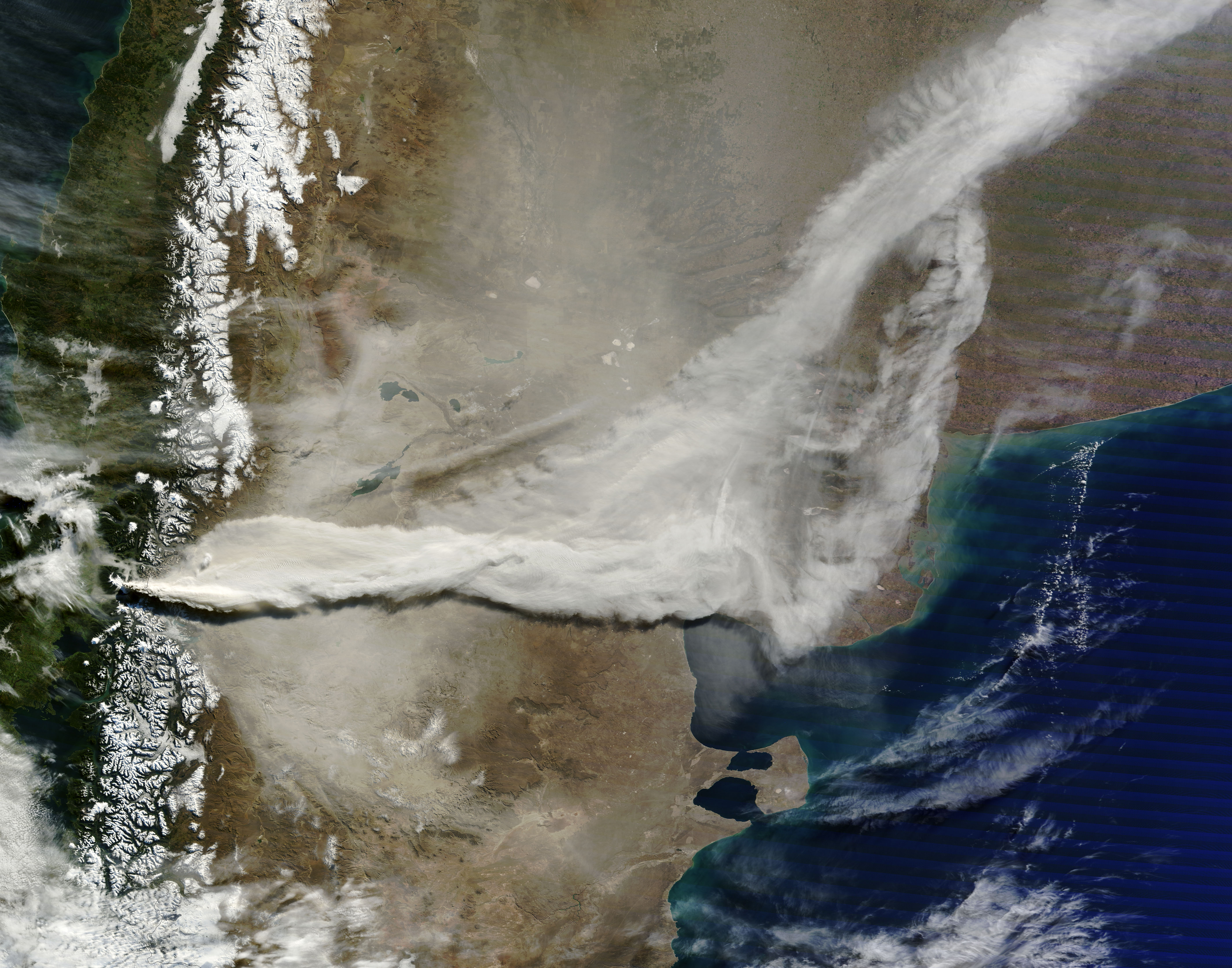
Image showing a large plume of volcanic ash blowing about 800 kilometers east and then northeast over Argentina.

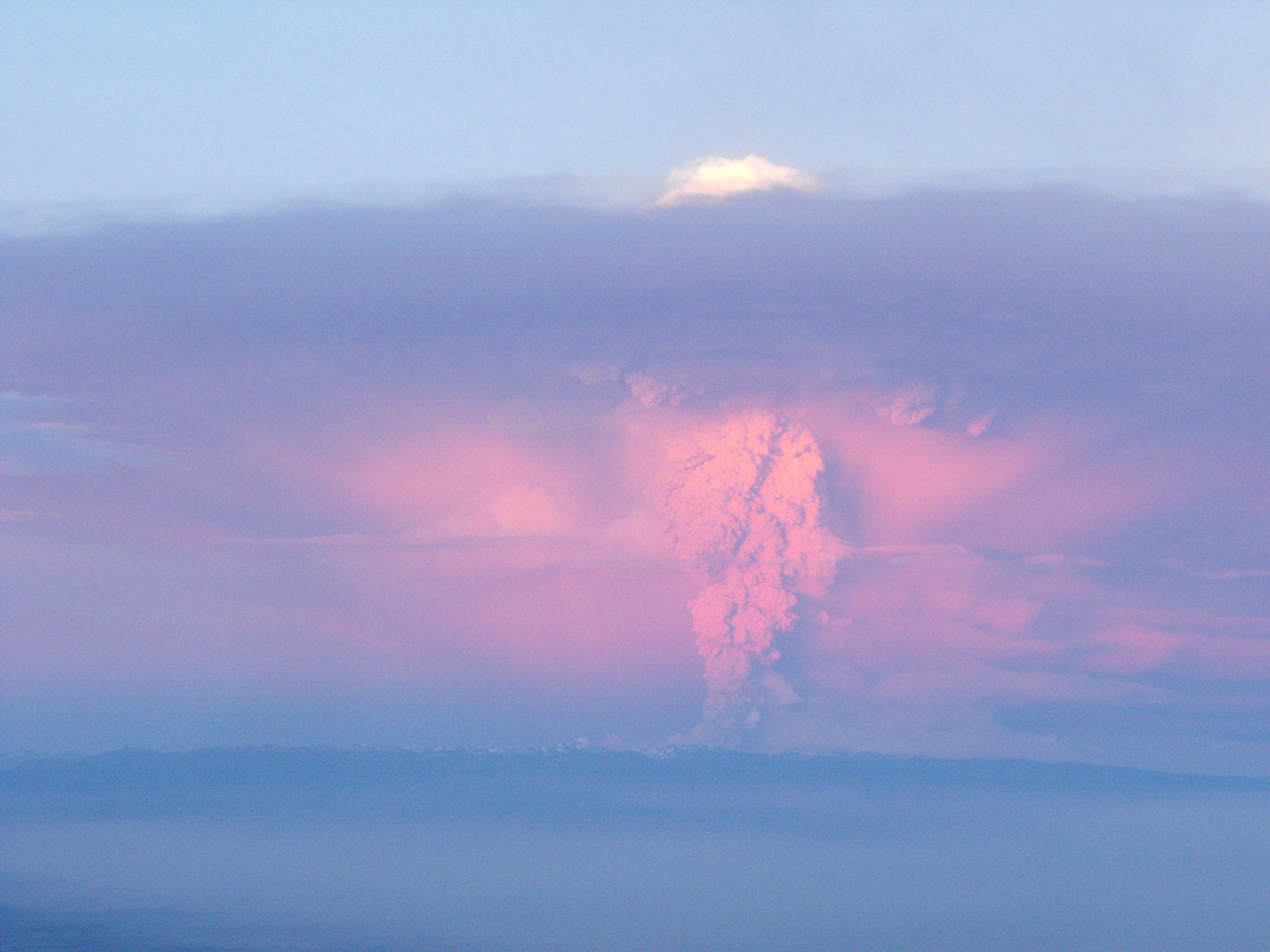
Airborne image of ash cloud on 5 June 2011

=== River temperature and contamination ===
The eruption of the Chilean volcano Puyehue significantly affected the surrounding environment. The temperature of the Nilahue River rose to 45 °C (113 °F) and killed an estimated 4.5 million fish with an economic impact on fish farming in the area. The cattle economy was also damaged.

Scientists from the Southern University of Chile analyzed waters from the Nilahue and Golgol rivers, the two principal collectors of waters from Cordón Caulle. Scientists found that if solid particles were removed the water was safe to drink.

Although very little ash was deposited on the western side of the volcano, the ash reached Puyehue Lake through river transport, depositing a layer of tephra at the bottom of the lake.

=== Livestock ===
The ash cloud led Argentina to declare a state of emergency for farmers as the prolonged eruption's continued effect on the 2 million head of sheep that graze in southern Argentina. Chubut and Río Negro Provinces had suffered five years of drought, and the ash destroyed the little pastureland still serviceable. 750,000 sheep suffered the consequences, and Rio Negro officials said 60,000 head of cattle also were "at risk." The livestock had suffered major heart attacks and many of which contracted throat cancer, resulting in death.

Whereas there appears to be no published support for the existence of heart attacks or throat cancer as a consequence from the exposure to ashes and causing death, there are at least two phenomena which play a role. First, the physical reduction of available forage (on top of the prevailing general drought conditions) has resulted in lack of forage, and therefore, starvation with all its consequences. This was accelerated by the rapid wear of teeth from the abrasive action of ashes, and thus a reduced efficiency to forage. Second, these ashes cause fluoride intoxication in herbivores, with many different symptoms, and confirmed in sheep, cattle and horses.

=== Wildlife and forests ===
However, besides livestock, also wild species are strongly affected by the ashes. Fluoride intoxication was first discovered in red deer (Cervus elaphus), with pronounced dental fluorosis. The result is formation of abnormal teeth both in physical form as well as in reduced hardness. It reduces foraging efficiency, eliminated pregnancies in subadults, and will reduce longevity by 50–75%. While the rate of fluoride intake exceeds the capacity to eliminate it, animals continue to accumulate fluoride. Before the eruption, fluoride levels in adults was about 50–60 ppm. On average, deer were judged to accumulate about 1,000 ppm per year under similar exposure to ashes, which remains the situation for many drier sites, where the winds constantly redeposit the ashes. Some deer accumulated more like 3,700 ppm per year and reached 5,175 ppm by the year 2012. This trend has remained for some areas as the most recent deer examined had adults which had reached 10,396 ppm. These high levels of fluorosis likely affect the skeleton, and a first case in deer with severe osteological pathology has been described in March 2015.

A study along Chile Route 215 showed that in places with ash falls of 10 cm about 8% of the trees died while at locations with 50 cm of ash 54% of the trees died. Ashes did not cause any significant abrasion of the canopy.

== Transport disruption ==
The images show the density of particles in the atmosphere (aerosols) as measured by the Ozone Monitoring Instrument on the Aura satellite. The series starts on 5 June 2011, the day after the eruption began, and continues through 13 June.

Ash poses a significant threat to aircraft because once sucked into engines, it can be transformed into molten glass by the high temperatures and potentially cause an engine to fail.

On the ground lava, ash and volcanic stone can impede vehicle movement.

=== Chile ===
Initially, because of the wind direction (to east), the flights within Chile were not interrupted and only the highway Route 215-CH and the "Cardenal Samore Pass" was reported to be covered by 10 to 15 cm of "volcanic stone" by Chilean authorities. and closed down on 4 June.

The Chilean government increased the frequency of barges on the Pirihueico Lake in Huahum Pass to transport passengers traveling between Chile and Argentina. Huahum Pass is approximately 100 km north of the closed "Cardenal Samore Pass".

On 22 June, as the ash cloud rounded the world and returned to Chile, the Chilean airline LAN cancelled flights to Temuco and Valdivia in the south of the country.

=== Argentina, Uruguay and Brazil ===
On 4 June at approximately 4:30 pm local time, Neuquén Airport was closed due to the ash cloud. Ash fell across a wide swathe of South America, forcing cancellation of most flights across the southern half of the continent. A planned meeting between the presidents of Argentina and Uruguay was cancelled because José Mujica was unable to fly to Buenos Aires.

South Brazil suffered a lot with flights between Buenos Aires, Montevideo, Santiago, Curitiba, Florianopolis and Porto Alegre cancelled.

=== Falkland Islands ===
Three Falkland Islands air links with the United Kingdom were merged onto one aircraft. Allocation operated according to a priority system, with passengers ranked in importance. The three highest categories were 1. Travel for medical reasons (as designated by the Director of Health and Education); 2. Students returning to study (as designated by the Director of Health and Education); 3. Business passengers at risk of a serious and unavoidable impact on their business. Passengers were strongly recommended to travel LAN Airlines as the ash cloud did not cover the route over Punta Arenas.

=== South Africa ===
On 14 June the South African Civil Aviation Authority released a statement saying that the ash cloud was being monitored and that there was no operational impact to the airlines. However, two local airlines, South African Airways and Kulula.com, cancelled some flights to and from Cape Town International Airport and East London Airport on 18 June; operations later resumed.

=== Australia and New Zealand ===
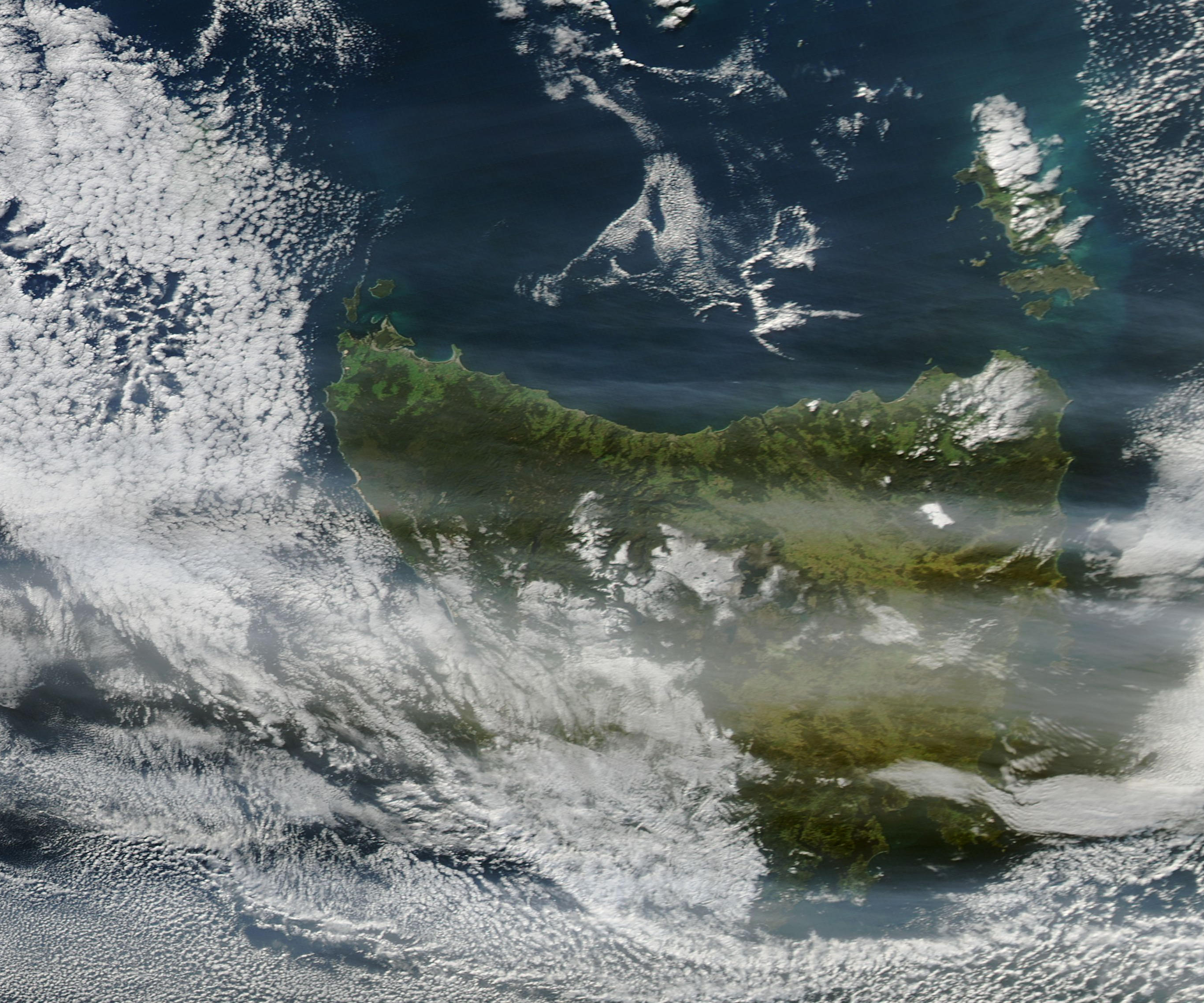
MODIS Aqua image of the ash cloud over Tasmania

At its greatest extent, strong winds had carried the ash cloud from Puyehue a great distance at high altitude, and the ash remained present for several days at distinct altitude bands between 20,000–35,000 feet over New Zealand and southern Australia, disrupting flights between Adelaide, Melbourne, Perth, and all of Tasmania and New Zealand. Initially Air New Zealand managed to avoid cancellations by flying their aircraft at lower altitudes (20,000 feet) in order to avoid ash, requiring 10% more fuel. Cancellations started by 15 June. Subsequently, Rob Fyfe of Air New Zealand hit back at malicious rumours from Australian airlines that continuing to fly was unsafe.

Virgin Australia resumed flights to southern Australia by 13 June, but Qantas and its subsidiary Jetstar did not resume flights until 14 and 15 June because the Volcanic Ash Advisory Centre in Australia did not have the technology to determine the thickness of the plume. Losses for the airlines are expected to be in the millions.

Flights to and from Perth were disrupted by the approaching plume of ash, extending from 15,000 to 35,000 feet.

On 20 June flights were once again cancelled at Adelaide and Mildura airports. On 21 and 22 June flights to Sydney, Canberra, Melbourne, Newcastle, Wagga Wagga and Albury airports were cancelled due to the ash cloud. As of 22 June 2011 the ash cloud was expected to move from Australia to New Zealand.

== Economic and financial impact ==
Macquarie Equities placed the cost of disruptions to airlines at A$21 million for Qantas and $11 million for Virgin Australia. The tourism industry was also impacted, costing Australia $15 million during the two-week period, with CEO John Lee of lobbying group Tourism & Transport Forum stating a daily cost of at least A$10 million as a result of complete closure of Sydney and Melbourne's main airports.

The government of Neuquen province, Argentina, declared an economic emergency as the ash cloud was harming tourism and threatening livestock. The decree by provincial governor Jorge Sapag allowed those affected to claim for tax and other benefits. In Argentina ashes from Puyehue were advertised for sale and some were also used for making handicrafts. The intendant of Villa La Angostura assured that there were plenty of ideas of what to do with the ashes, among them bricks. In addition ashes were used to improve gravel roads around San Carlos de Bariloche.

The president Cristina Fernández announced on national television plans to supply $2.41 billion to 1,400 farmers and businesses in the area affected by the ash cloud. They also plan to spend $7 million on the cleanup operation, and double social benefits, and defer tax payments for the hardest hit regions.

== See also ==
- List of volcanoes in Chile
- Volcanism of Chile
