= Golgol River =

Gol-Gol
- Native name: Río Gol-Gol (Spanish)

Location
- Country: Chile

Physical characteristics
- Source
  - location: Constancia Lake
- Mouth
  - location: Puyehue Lake
  - coordinates: 40°40′35″S 72°20′25″W
  - elevation: 212 m (696 ft)

The Gol-Gol River is the main tributary of Puyehue Lake in southern Chile. Gol-Gol River runs in an east-west direction between the volcanoes Puyehue-Cordón Caulle and Casablanca. Its catchment areas covers the whole area between these massifs from the Cardenal Antonio Samoré Pass to Puyehue Lake.

== See also ==
- List of rivers of Chile
