= Pajaritos =

Pajaritos may refer to:

- Pajaritos, Chile
- Pajaritos, Nayarit, in the state of Nayarit, Mexico
- Pajaritos, San Luis Potosí, in the state of San Luis Potosí, Mexico
- Pajaritos, Veracruz, a maritime terminal and petrochemical complex near Coatzacoalcos that located in state of Veracruz, Mexico

== See also ==
- Pajarito (disambiguation)
