= Chile Route 215 =

Highway in Chile

Route 215
- Ruta 215
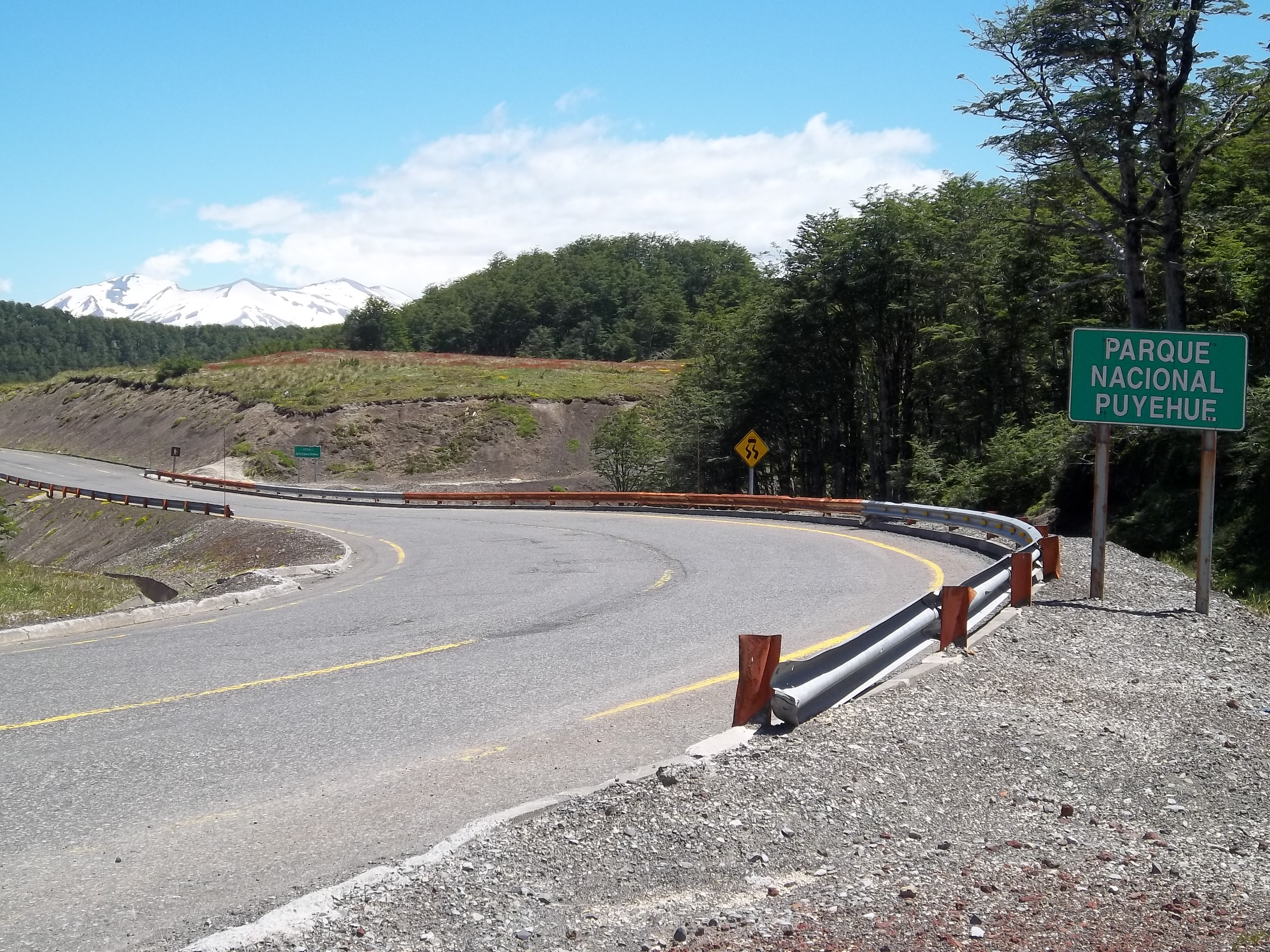
- Route 215-CH, Puehue volcano is seen at the background.

Location
- Country: Chile

Highway system
- Highways in Chile

Route 215-CH is a branch line road going eastward from Osorno at Chile Highway 5 to Cardenal Antonio Samoré Pass at the border to Argentina. Apart from connecting southern Chile with Argentina, the road is also the main access to Antillanca ski resort, Puyehue National Park and the hot springs of Puyehue and Aguas Calientes.

From west to east localities along the road are: Osorno, Las Ruedas, Las Lumas, Entre Lagos and Pajaritos.

== See also ==
- Route U-40
