= Pajarito =

Pajarito may refer to:

== Places ==
- Pajarito, Boyacá, a town and municipality in the La Libertad Province, Boyacá, Columbia
- Pajarito Formation, a Mesozoic geologic formation in the New Mexico and Texas, United States
- Pajarito Mesa, New Mexico, a census-designated place southwest of Albuquerque, New Mexico
- Pajarito Mountain Ski Area, a ski area in New Mexico, United States
- Pajarito, New Mexico, a census-designated place south of Albuquerque, New Mexico
- Pajarito Plateau, a volcanic plateau in north central New Mexico, United States

== People ==
- Roberto "Pajarito" Buitrago (born 1937), Colombian road racing cyclist
- Nicasio Pajarito Gonzalez (born 1935), Mexican potter known for his canelo ware

== See also ==
- Pajarito Mountains (disambiguation)
- Pajaritos (disambiguation)
