= Pajarito Mountains =

Pajarito Mountains or Sierra Pajaritos may refer to:

- Pajarito Mountains (Arizona), in the United States
- Pajarito Mountains (Chile)
- Pajarito Mountains (Nayarit), in Mexico
- Pajarito Mountains (Sonora), in Mexico
