= Puyehue National Park =

National park in the Andes Mountains, Chile

- IUCN category II (national park)
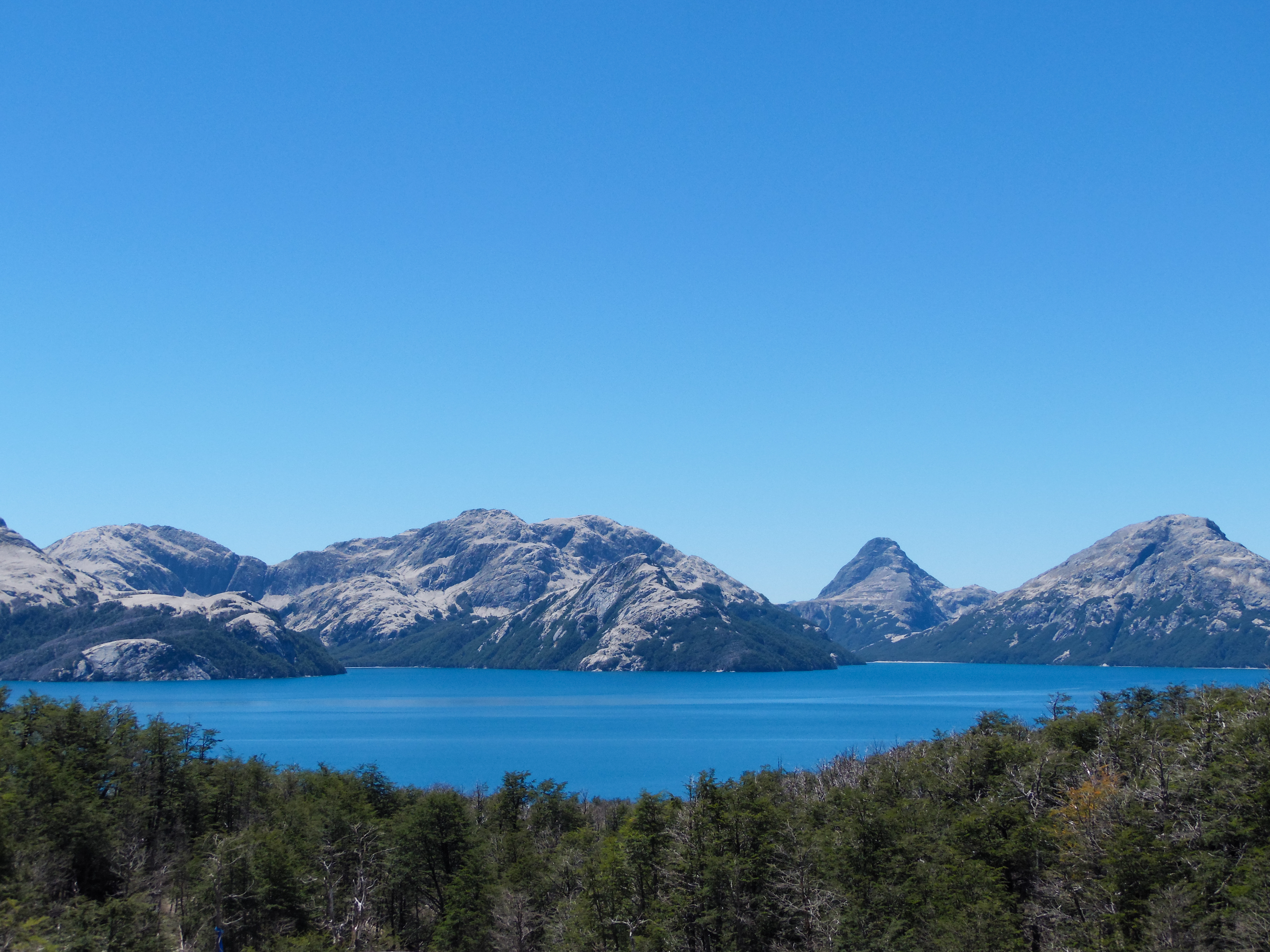
- Constancia Lake within the national park.

- Location within Chile
- Location: Los Lagos Region, Chile
- Nearest city: Osorno
- Coordinates: 40°38′56″S 72°5′4″W
- Area: 1,070 km^{2} (413 sq mi)
- Established: 1941
- Visitors: 133,037 (in 2012)
- Governing body: Corporación Nacional Forestal

Puyehue National Park (Spanish pronunciation: [puˈjewe]) is in the Andes mountain range, in Los Ríos and Los Lagos regions of Chile formerly referred to as the 10th region. The park boasts 220,000 acres of natural thermal springs, volcanoes, and evergreen forests, after having been expanded in 1950 and 1981. The park is Chile's most visited national park with some 400,000 people using it each year. Puyehue National Park forms part of the Reserve of Temperate Rainy Forest Biospheres of the Southern Andes. Chile Route 215 passes through the park, which connects with the Argentine Route 231 via Cardenal Antonio Samoré Pass.

== Location ==
The park lies in the Osorno Province, town of Puyehue. It is 118 miles northeast of Puerto Montt, or 50 miles east of Osorno.

== Destinations ==
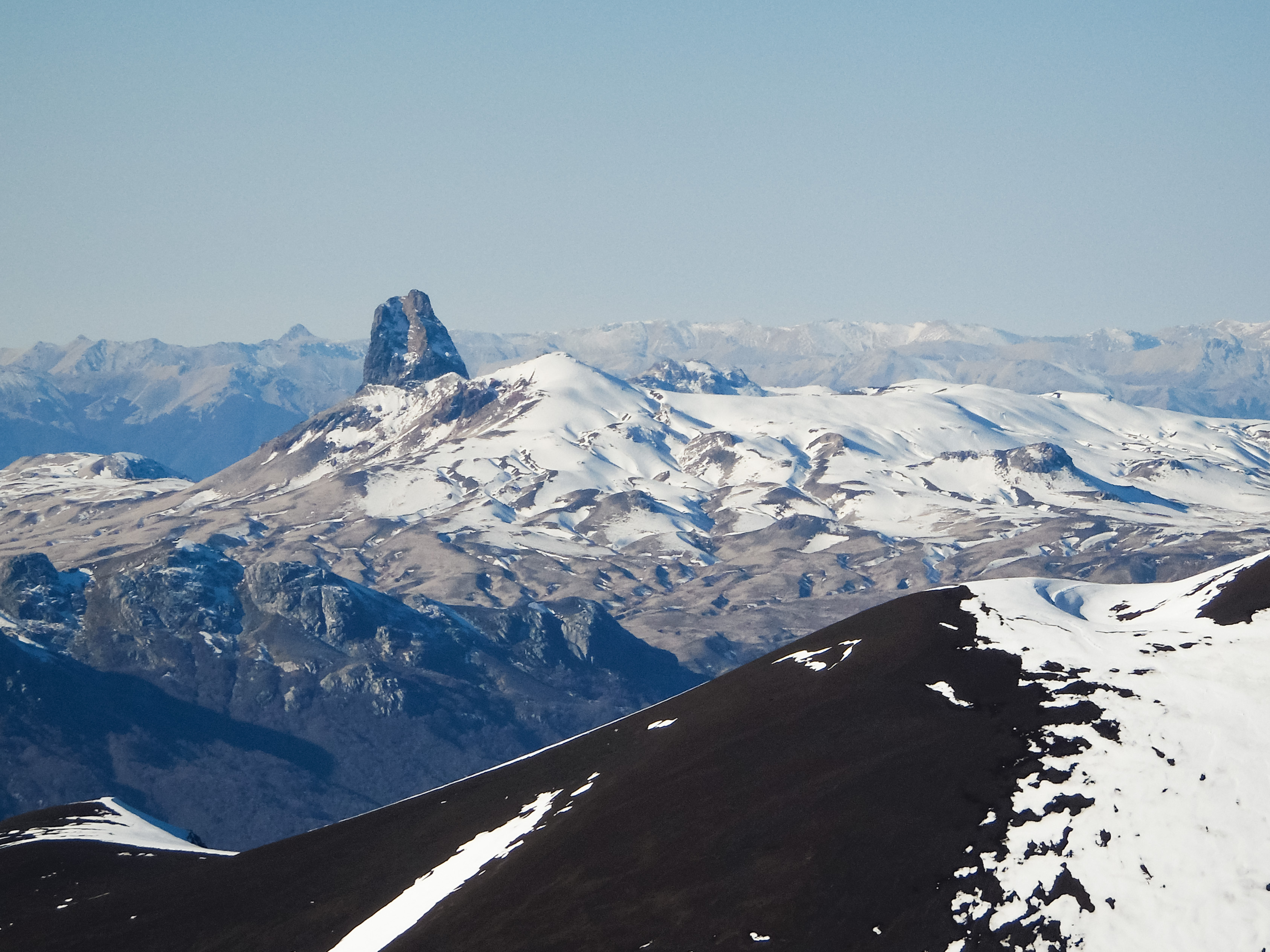
Cerro Pantojo, Región de Los Lagos

The park is dominated by Puyehue volcano, Cordón Caulle and Antillanca Group. The park is divided into three main areas: Aguas Calientes, Anticura, and Antillanca. Each area has special activities according to its landscape. Aguas Calientes feature natural thermal baths and hiking trails. Anticura area features the Puyehue volcano, the El Puma lookout point, the Cordón Caulle and hot springs, a volcanic area, and a strawberry field, called the Pampa de Frutilla, the Salto de la Princesa, a waterfall of an inlet of the Golgol river, and an 800-year-old forest of coigüe trees, as well as recreational trails. The Antillanca area features crater Raihuén and Mirador hill, the Las Gaviotas river (río Las Gaviotas) as well as the Rupanco Lake (lago Rupanco). Furthermore, there is skiing at the Antillanca ski center, on the slopes of the Casablanca volcano.

== Water and waterways in the park ==
The Golgol and the Las Gaviotas river are the main waterways in the park. The Chanleufú also flows through the park. Two distributaries of the Golgol include Anticura and Pajaritos, which both flow into Lake Puyehue, which is outside the park. Five lakes inside the park include Constancia, Gris, Paraíso, Lake Berlin, and part of the Rupanco Lake.

== Administration ==
Puyehue National Park has warden stations in each of its three areas. The main administration is in the Aguas Calientes area. Puyehue National Park has a Center of Environmental Information that provides fauna and flora information in both the Aguas Calientes and the Anticura areas. The Anticura area has a CONAF guard station, and a campsite. And finally, the Antillanca area of Puyehue National Park has a ski center and a good hotel open all year round. Free entrance. The Anticura section costs 800 Chilean pesos to enter, which is about 1.60 usd.

== Facilities ==
Puyehue National Park includes a hotel with a thermal complex, a lodging house, cabins, and campsites.

== Activities ==
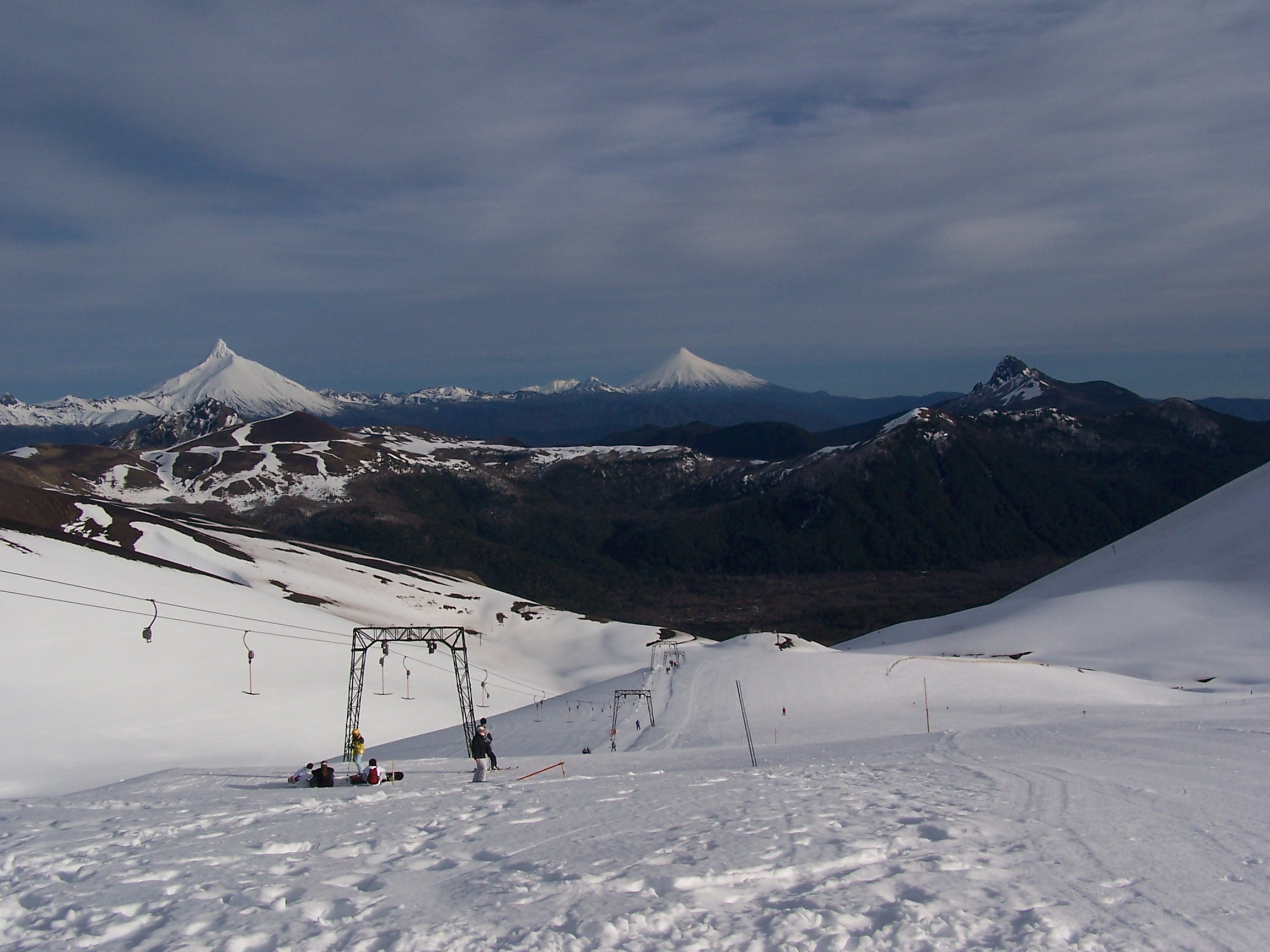
The Antillanca ski resort.

Hiking, trekking, fishing, fauna and flora observation, swimming (heated pool), photography, climbing, excursions, horseback riding, snowboarding, mountain bike riding, downhill skiing, cross country skiing and bird watching are the activities that can be practised in the park.

== Trees and foliage ==
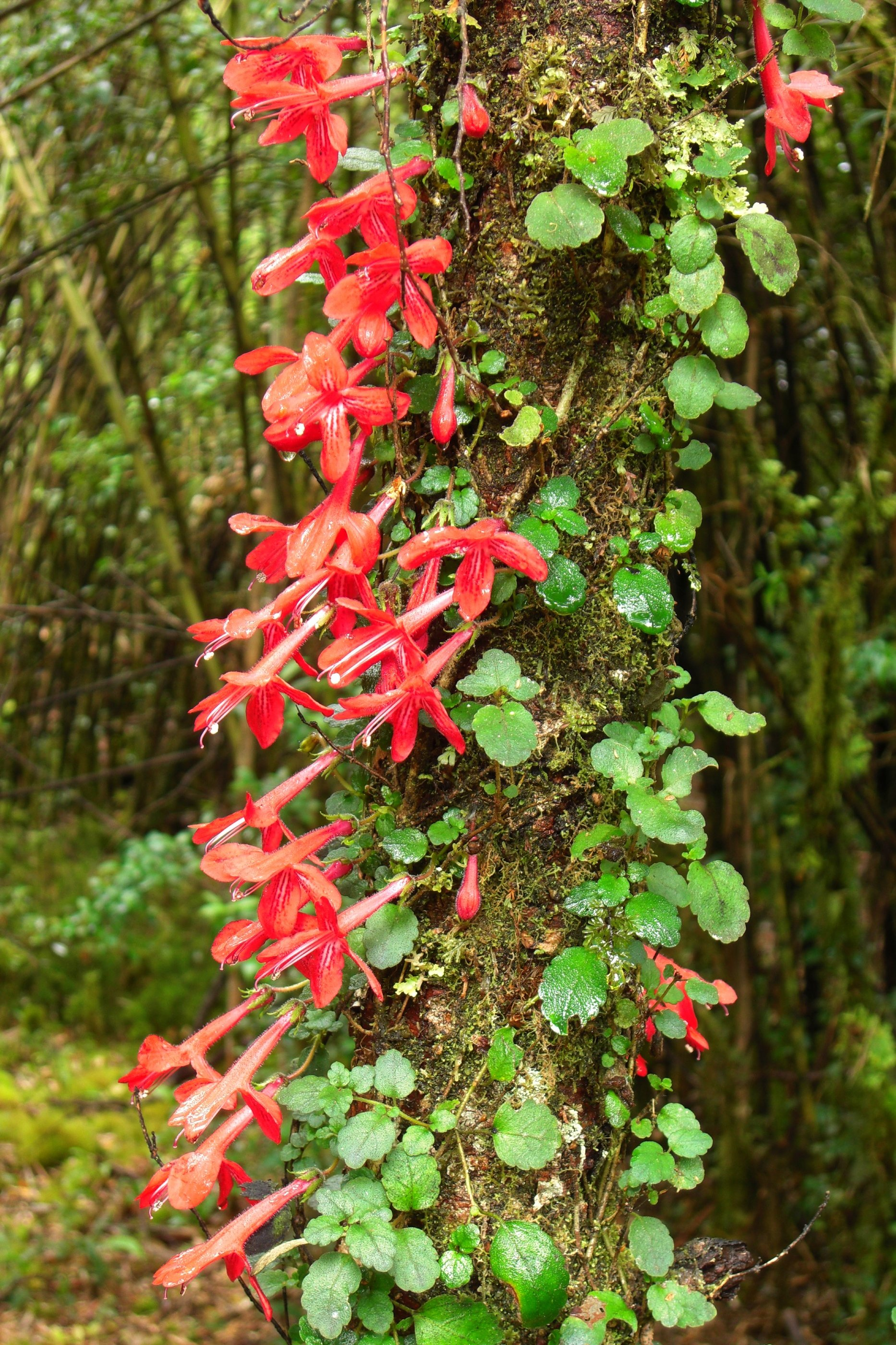
Asteranthera ovata (Cav.) Hanst.

Its flora in the lower parts is that one of Valdivian temperate rain forest and is similar to that of its southern neighbor, the Vicente Pérez Rosales National Park.

Temperate evergreen forests occur at lower elevations. Species of trees include coigüe (Nothofagus dombeyi) and the common ulmo (Eucryphia cordifolia), olivillo (Aextoxicon punctatum) and tineo (Weinmannia trichosperma). The underbrush has abundant bushes, ferns, moss and lichens, giving it great forest richness. At higher altitude there are coigüe woods with tepa (Laureliopsis philippiana) and mañío (Saxegothaea conspicua), which later became the dominant species. Pure stands of Nothofagus betuloides and Nothofagus pumilio are found just below the tree line.

Forests of coigües de Magallanes (Nothofagus betuloides), with dense underbrush (Nothofagus pumilio), a species of deciduous leaves that become reddish during Autumn. Communities of marshes called “mallines” can be observed, covered with thick moss. Other tree species found in the park include (Nothofagus antarctica), a species of law brushwood, and cypress of Guaitecas (Pilgerodendron uviferum).

== Animals ==
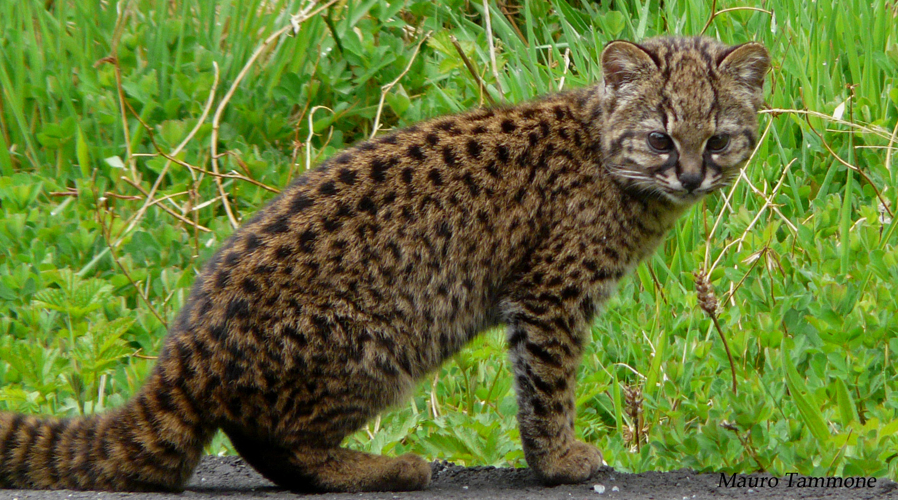
Güiña in Parque Nacional Puyehue

Mammals in the Puyehue National Park are the puma, gray fox (pseudalopex griseus), the quique (galictis cuja) or ferret, the coypu (Myocastor coypus), the güiña (Felis guigna) or wild cat and the chingue (Conepatus chinga), skunks and vizcachas.

The park is also a birdwatching destination with sightings of the torrent duck (pato correntino), the Magellanic woodpecker (carpintero negro), the Chilean pigeon (torcaza), the hued-hued (huet-huet), the Andean condor, the great grebe (huala), the Southern house wren (chercán) and the buff-necked ibis (bandurria).

== Trails ==
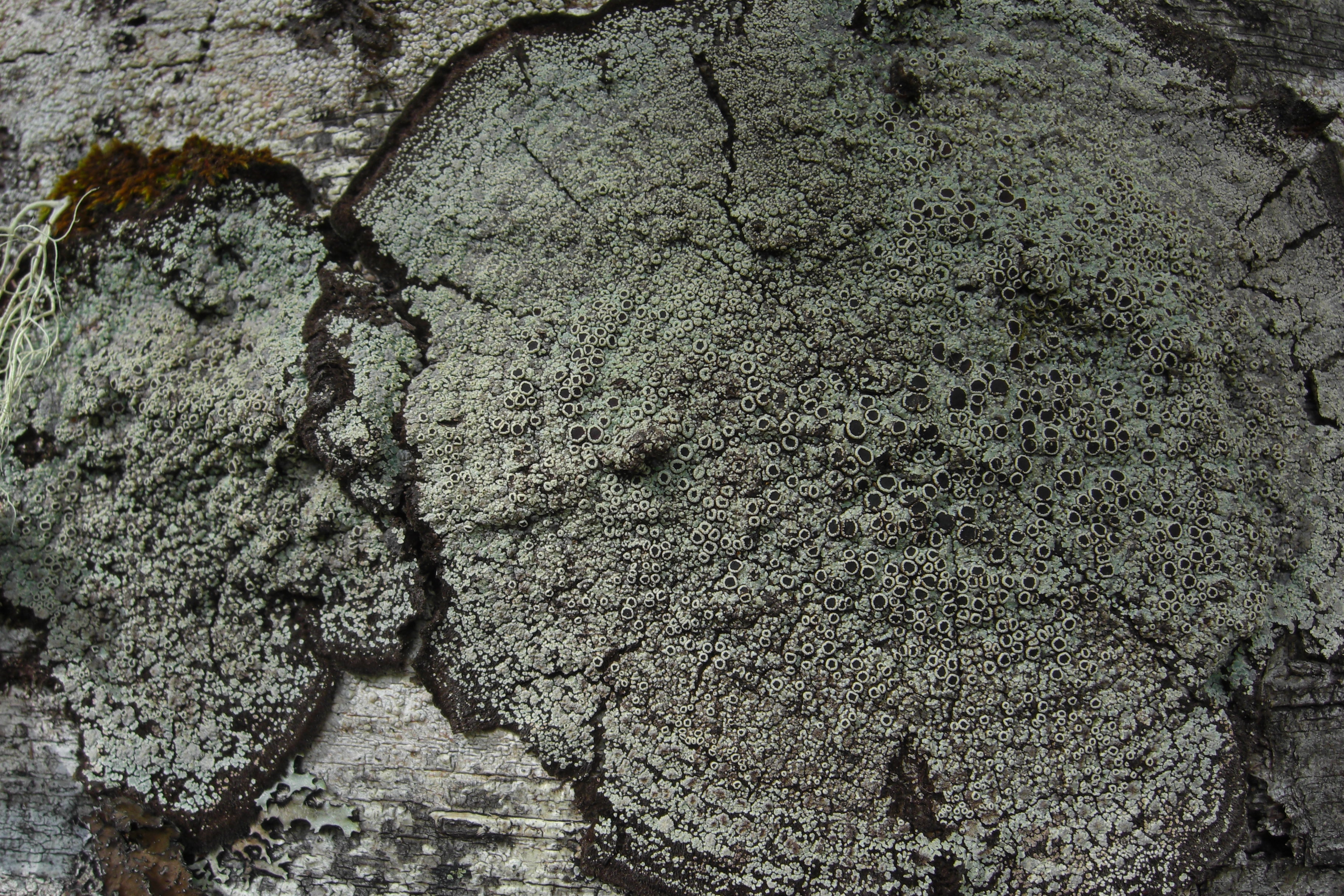
Pannaria 2.440 (subalpine forest at foot of Casablanca (volcano) in Puyehue) (note the black prothallus; this specimen peeled off the substrate readily in one piece, like an iron-on patch on a pair of jeans)

Aguas Calientes Area

- An excursion trail to the Berlín lake (lago Berlín), is 6.8 miles long, and takes about 5 hours, round trip. It runs along a stretch of the old road from Aguas Calientes to Antillanca, up to the Berlín lake, where there's a rustic shelter for six people.
- El Pionero recreational trail, which 5,905 feet long, takes 1 hour and 20 minutes round trip. It leads to a viewpoint.
- El Recodo recreational trail, is 1,246 feet, and takes 15 minutes round trip. It connects with the Aguas Calientes area where you can eat.
- The Chanlefú Rapids educational trail is 3,937 feet. It takes an hour and a half round trip. It leads to waterfalls and river rapids.
- Los Derrumbes recreational trail, 1,902 feet long, takes 45 minutes round trip.
- The pools of the Aguas Calientes reach up to 42 °C (108 °F), and make for an inviting spot to relax alongside the Rio Pichilanleufu

Anticura Area (Sun stone)

- An excursion trail to Puyehue volcano, is 9.9 miles long, and the volcano is 2240 meters high. This excursion takes 2 or 3 days round trip. It's a self-guided trail that reaches the volcano, the sulfur deposits, and the hot springs of the Caulle mountain range. On the hillsides of the volcano there's a rustic shelter for 12 people. During the 1960 earthquake, the volcano released flowing rivers of lava that turned a vast tract of the dense forest into sand dunes and lava spillways.
- Excursion trail to the strawberry field or Pampa de la Frutilla, is 12.4 miles long, and takes between 2 or 3 days round trip. It starts at the 1.8 mile marker of Anticuar. An old road continues from the Último Puesto area, and then crosses the forest until it stretches out onto an Andean prairie. In the Seca Lagoon (Laguna Seca) there's a rustic shelter.
- Salto de la Princesa recreational trail, is 2,329 feet, and takes about 30 minutes. It leads to the Salto de la Princesa, a waterfall of an inlet of the Gol-Gol river, which is generally dry during the summertime.
- The Salto del Indio recreational trail is 3,116 feet long, equal to 40 minutes round trip. It's a self-guided road that shows the aspects of the evergreen forest, passes by 800-year-old coigüe trees leads to waterfall of the Gol-Gol river.
- The Repucura educational trail is 3,608 feet round trip.
- EL Puma lookout point trail is 4,593 feet long, and takes an hour and a half round trip. It crosses the Anticuar River on a hanging bridge and goes up to a viewpoint towards Puyehue volcano to the North, and also leads to the valley of the Gol-Gol river.

Antillanca Area (Sun jewel)

- A Trail to the Mirador hill (cerro Mirador) is 2.4 miles long. During the summertime there's a road coming out from the hotel that goes up the Raihuén crater (crater Raihuén) and the Mirador hill. This is a starting point for an excursion trail that goes down the Las Gaviotas river (río Las Gaviotas) and up to the bank of the Rupanco lake (lago Rupanco). The beaches of the lake are a place to practice water sports and fly fishing, and you can explore the native rainforest and watch deer roaming its islands. The Puntiagudo and Osorno Volcanoes can be seen here.
- It is also possible to go skiing at the Antillanca ski center, on the slopes of the Casablanca volcano.

== Weather ==
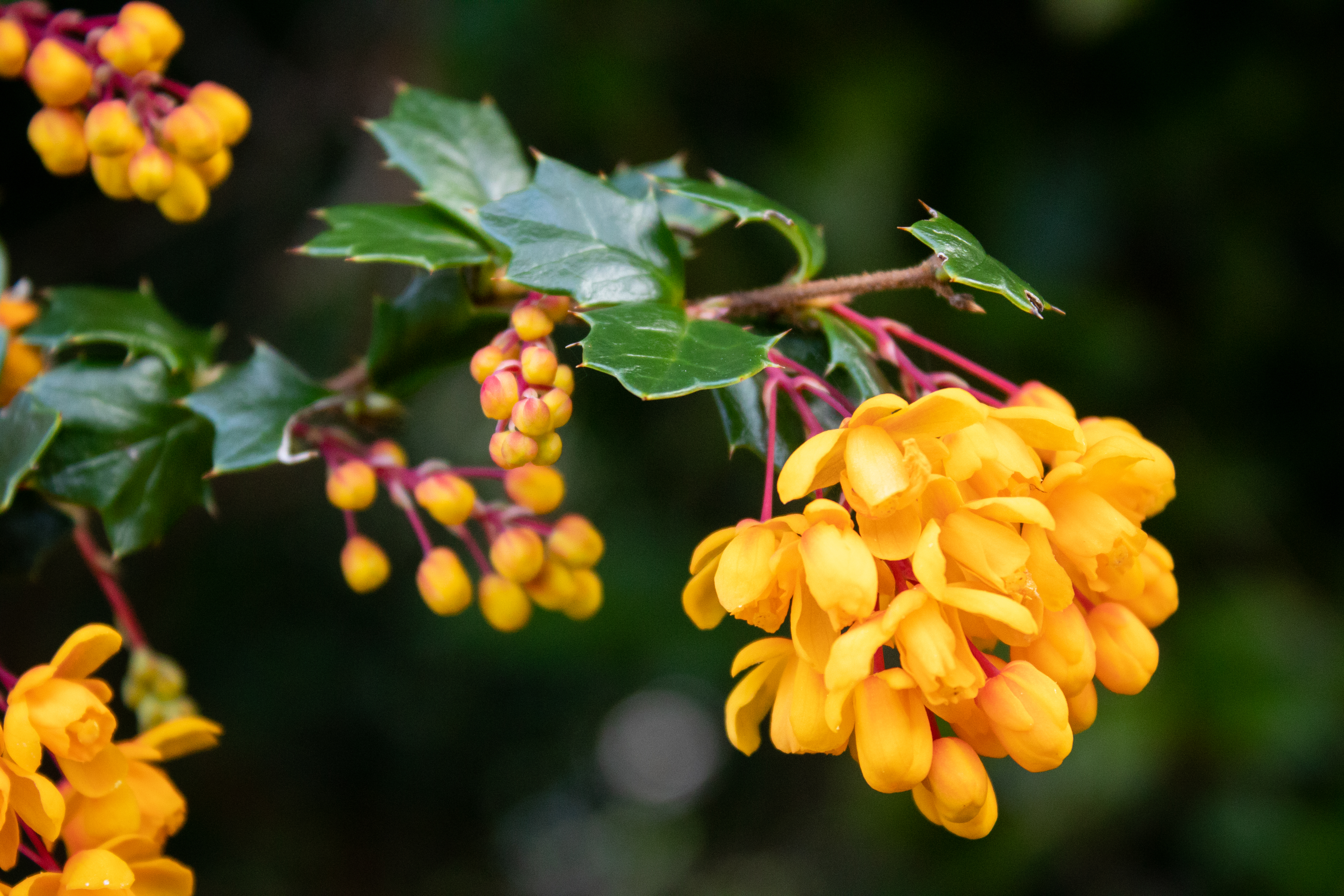
Michay (Darwin's barberry) in Región de Los Lagos, end of August

It is rainy in the park all year long, although the rainiest months are between March and September. During the winter and spring there is snow on the ground. The average annual temperature is 8 °C (46 °F), rising in the summer months to between 10 and 18 °C (50 and 64 °F) . The average annual rainfall is 450 mm (18 in).

== Energy project ==
In 2008, the government approved a hydroelectric project in the park. This was controversial because the project would be carried out by a private company, and the resource is in a public park. There were also concerns about the environmental impact.
