= Pajaritos, Chile =

Pajaritos
- Interactive map of Pajaritos
- Coordinates: 40°39′41.93″S 72°7′34.93″W
- Region: Los Lagos
- Province: Osorno
- Municipalidad: Puyehue
- Comuna: Puyehue

Government
  - Type: Municipalidad
  - Alcalde: María Jimena Núñez
- Elevation: 447 m (1,467 ft)

Population (2017 census)
  - Total: 27
- Time zone: UTC−04:00 (Chilean Standard)
  - Summer (DST): UTC−03:00 (Chilean Daylight)
- Area code: Country + town = 56 + 64

Parajitos (lit. "Small birds") is a customs and border control complex along Chile Route 215 near Cardenal Antonio Samoré Pass (Puyehue Pass). Administratively it is part of the commune of Puyehue in Osorno Province, Los Lagos Region. The National Statistics Institute lists the settlement as a hamlet (Spanish: caserío) having 27 inhabitants as of 2017.
