= Constancia Lake =

Lake in Chile

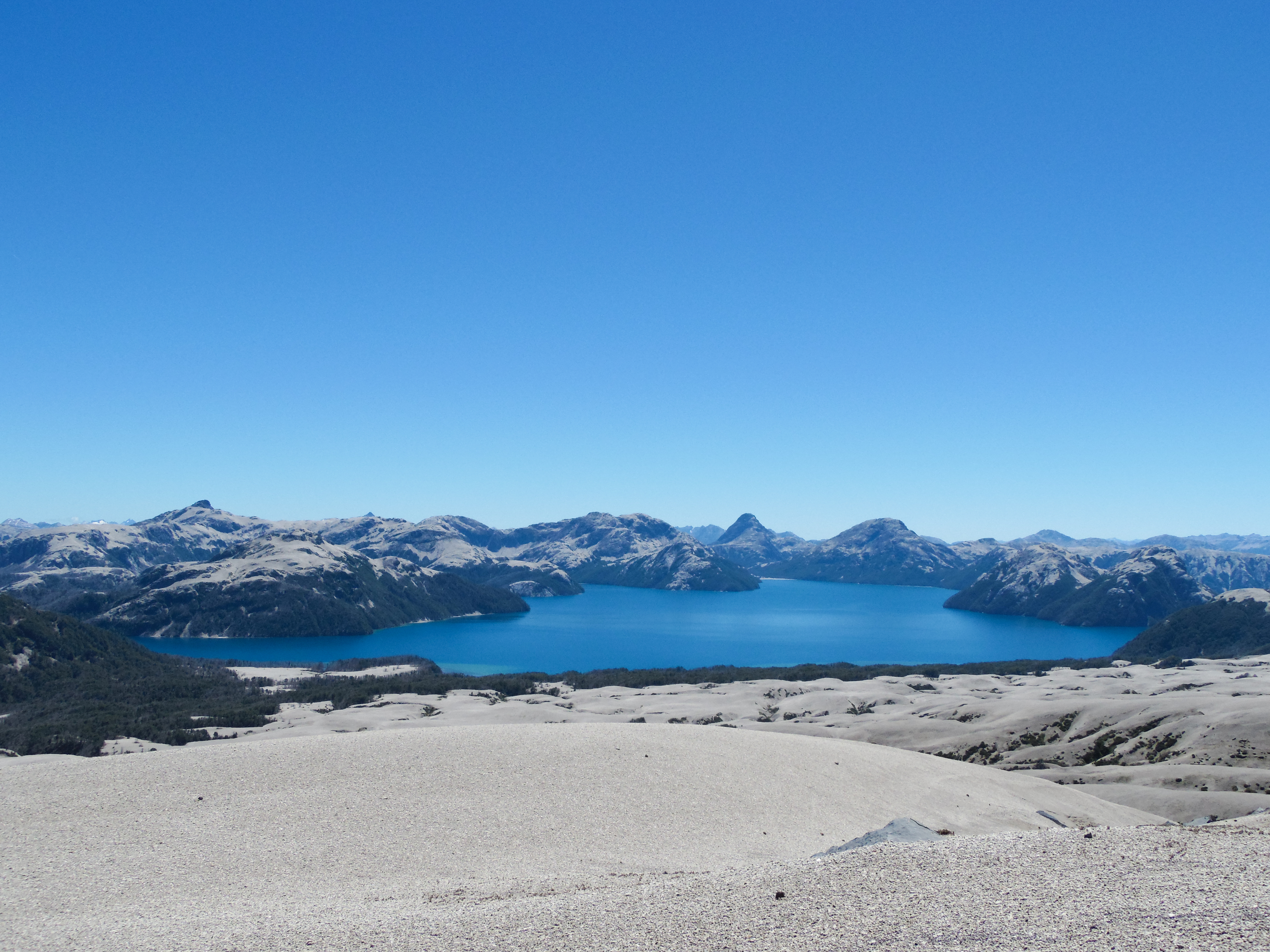

- Location within Los Lagos
- Coordinates: 40°38′S 71°54′W
- Primary outflows: Bonito River
- Basin countries: Chile
- Surface area: 17 km^{2} (6.6 sq mi)
- Surface elevation: 1,290 m (4,230 ft)

Constancia Lake is located in Los Lagos Region of Chile, within Puyehue National Park. It is overlooked by mountains whose divides mark the border between Argentina and Chile to the east, and between Los Ríos Region and Los Lagos region to the north.

The lake is drained through the Bonito River, which is a short stream that flows into the Golgol River.
