= Pilmaiquén Hydroelectric Plant =

Power stations

Pilmaiquén Hydroelectric Plant is a series of hydroelectric power stations and projects owned by Statkraft, using water from Pilmaiquén River in Los Ríos Region, Chile.

== Rucatayo ==
The Rucatayo plant produces 39 megawatts (52,000 hp) of electricity. The plant was built by ENDESA between 1944 and 1959 was owned by Pilmaiquén S.A. until 2015, when Statkraft bought it, along with the development rights to Osorno and Los Lagos. Rucatayo delivers around 304 GWh per year.

== Los Lagos ==
The Los Lagos project was planned at 50.8 MW power, delivering around 310 GWh per year. It was modified to 51.6 MW power, but reduced to 260 GWh energy per year, starting in late 2022.

== Osorno ==
The Osorno project has 54.3 MW power, delivering around 343 GWh per year. No decision has been made about starting the project.
