= Pilmaiquén River =

Location
- Country: Chile

Physical characteristics
- Source
  - location: Puyehue Lake
  - elevation: 212 m (696 ft)
- Mouth: Bueno River
  - coordinates: 40°21′00″S 73°07′43″W
- Length: 68 km (42 mi)

Pilmaiquén River is a river of Chile that makes up part of the border between Los Lagos Region and Los Ríos Region. Its source is Puyehue Lake and flows northwesterly for about 68 km until discharging into Bueno River.

Located near the origin of the river is the town of Entre Lagos and Pilmaiquén Hydroelectric Plant.
