= Refugio del Lago Airport =

- IATA: none; ICAO: SCOL

Summary
- Airport type: Private
- Serves: Termas de Puyehue, Chile
- Elevation AMSL: 676 ft / 206 m
- Coordinates: 40°41′22″S 72°20′45″W

Map
- Location of the airport in Chile

Runways
Direction	Length		Surface
Direction	m	ft	Surface
11/29	1,640	5,381	Grass
- Source: GCM Google Maps

Refugio del Lago Airport (ICAO: SCOL) is an airport serving the Termas de Puyehue resort area in the Los Lagos Region of Chile.

The airport is on the eastern shore of Puyehue Lake. West approach and departure are over the water. There is a large hill just south of the runway, and mountainous terrain to the south and east.

== See also ==
- Transport in Chile
- List of airports in Chile
