= Pajarito Mountains (Sonora) =

Mountain range in Mexico

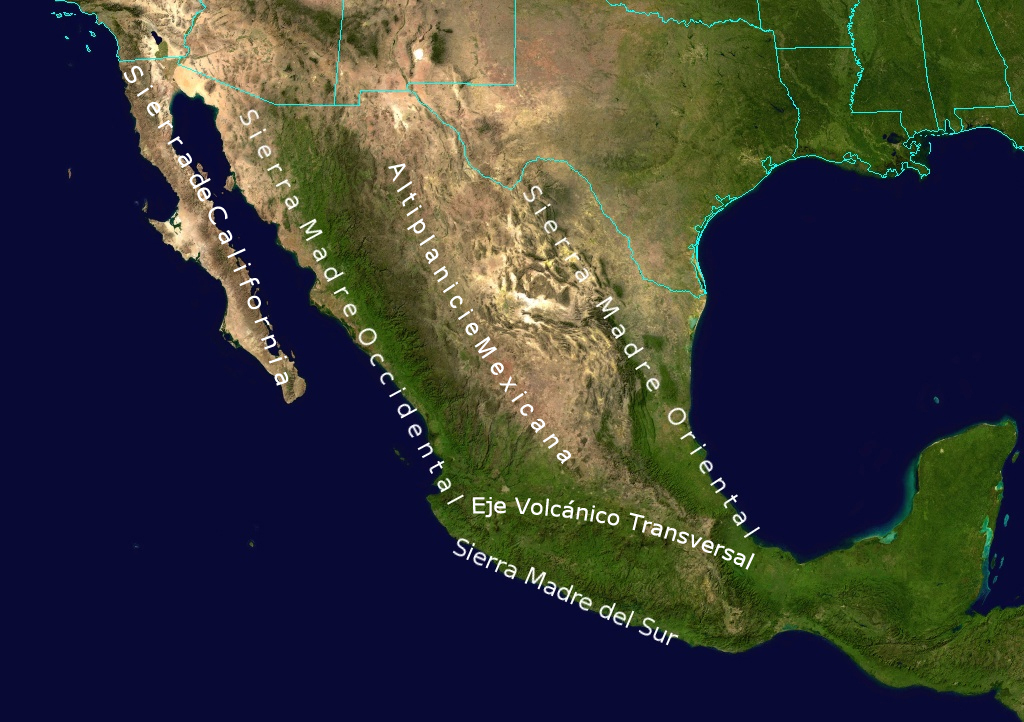

Naming
- Native name: Sierra El Pajarito (Spanish)

Geography
- Country: Mexico
- State: Sonora
- Region: northwestern Mexico
- Range coordinates: 29°23′15″N 110°07′19″W
- Parent range: Sierra Madre Occidental
- Topo map: NH12-08

Geology
- Orogeny: Laramide
- Rock type: Volcanic

The Pajarito Mountains (Sierra El Pajarito, Sierra Pajapitos) are a small mountain range in the Sierra Madre Occidental. They are located in the state of Sonora in northwestern Mexico.

== Geography ==
To the north are the El Jaralito Mountains, between them and the Pajaritos is the Ures River (Río Ures).
