= Pajarito Mountains (Chile) =

Mountain range in Chile

- Location within Chile

Highest point
- Coordinates: 28°00′01″S 070°40′42″W

The Pajarito Mountains (Sierra Pajaritos) are a small mountain range in the Atacama Desert of Chile on the west coast of South America. Together with Paico Peak (Cerro El Paico) they divide the Algarrobal Basin into two hydrological units.
