= Entre Lagos =

Coordinates: 40°41′08″S 72°36′09″W

- Town
- Interactive map of Entre Lagos
- Country: Chile
- Region: Los Lagos
- Province: Osorno
- Elevation: 200 m (657 ft)

Population (2002)
  - Total: 3,358
- Time zone: UTC-4
  - Summer (DST): UTC-3
- Climate: Cfb

Entre Lagos is the main town of Puyehue commune in Osorno Province of Los Lagos Region, Chile. It is 46 km (29 mi) east of Osorno, next to the entrance of the Pilmaiquén River at the western end of Puyehue Lake. It is the only town of any size on the lake.

Due to Entre Lagos's location between Puyehue Lake to the north and Rupanco Lake to the south, the town takes its name from its geographical position between the lakes (in Latin inter lacus). It was originally known as "El Desague" and had a ferry that ran the length of the lake to the Termas de Puyehue resort area.

== See also ==
- Interlaken
- Interlagos
- List of towns in Chile
