= Antillanca ski resort =

Ski resort in Chile

Antillanca
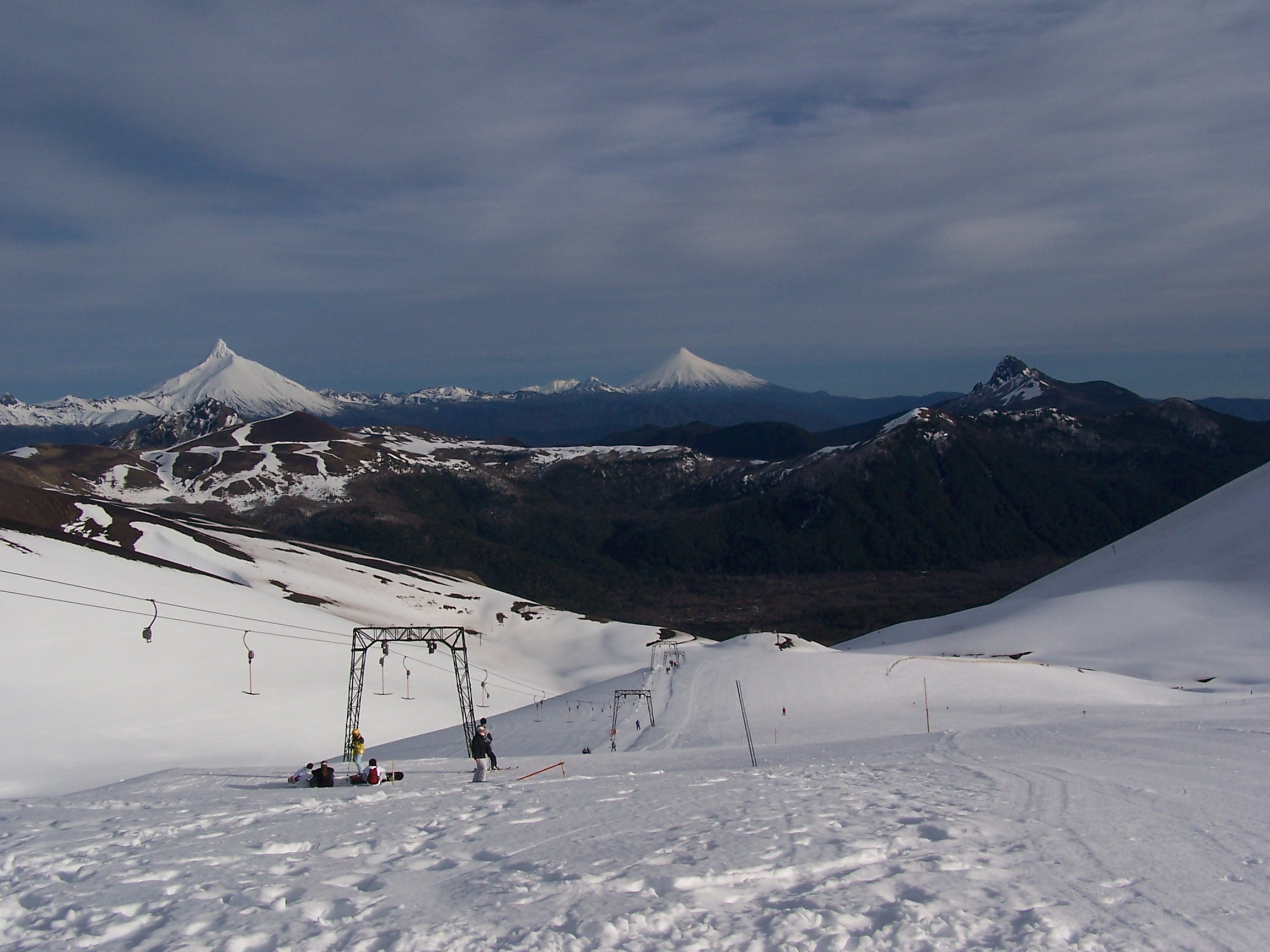
- Interactive map of Antillanca
- Location: Andes Mountains, Chile
- Nearest major city: Osorno
- Top elevation: 1,540 m (5,050 ft)
- Base elevation: 1,040 m (3,410 ft)
- Trails: 14
- Longest run: 2,800 m (9,200 ft)
- Lift system: 1 chairlift, 4 surface lift
- Website: http://www.antillanca.cl/

Antillanca is a ski resort in the Puyehue National Park, Los Lagos Region, in southern Chile. The nearest city is Osorno, 98 kilometers away.

Antillanca gets its name from the Mapudungun "antü llangka", which means "pearl of the sun".

== Location ==
This ski resort is located in the Puyehue National Park, on the slope of the Casablanca Volcano, near the Puyehue and Aguas Calientes hot springs, all belonging to the Antillanca volcanic complex.

== Runs and lifts ==
Antillanca has 14 marked tracks, 3 for beginners, 4 for intermediates, 6 for advanced and 1 for experts. With a total of 400 hectares of skiable area, the longest is 2800 meters long. In addition to these, there are 14 other natural tracks of different levels of difficulty.

There are 5 mechanical means that allow access to slopes, 1 two-seater chairlift and 4 ski lifts.

== Services ==
The resort has several services associated with skiing and snowboarding: equipment rental, ski and snowboard school, mechanical workshop, among others. There is also a cafeteria and a medical center to support practitioners.

The complex also has a 45-room hotel and a refuge with 85 rooms. The hotel has a heated swimming pool, restaurant, bar, cafeteria and gym.
