= Cardenal Antonio Samoré Pass =

Mountain pass on the border between Argentina and Chile

Cardenal Antonio Samoré
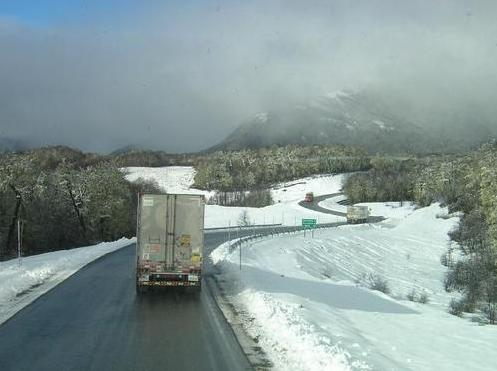
- View of the pass during winter
- Interactive map of Cardenal Antonio Samoré
- Elevation: 1,314 metres (4,311 ft)

Third Approach
- Location: Argentina–Chile border
- Range: Andes
- Coordinates: 40°42′S 71°56′W

Cardenal Antonio Samoré Pass (Spanish: Paso Cardenal Antonio Samoré) is one of the main mountain passes through the southern Andes along the border between Argentina and Chile.

Together with Paso Libertadores, it is one of the easiest of the Argentina-Chile passes, and one of the few with asphalted roads in the region. The main towns and cities respectively on both sides of the pass are Entre Lagos and Osorno in Chile and Villa La Angostura and San Carlos de Bariloche in Argentina. From the Chilean side the pass is accessed through Route 215-CH, branch line which begins at the Panamerican Highway in Osorno. On the Argentine side the pass is reached by Ruta Nacional 231.

Since 1974 there is a treaty that guarantee the transport of Chilean goods from the Chilean X Los Lagos Region to the XII Magallanes and Antártica Chilena Region over the Paso Samoré through the Argentine Patagonia.

Samoré Pass on the map

== Climate ==
Climate data for Cerro Mirador, Elevation: 1261 m (1997–2020)
Month	Jan	Feb	Mar	Apr	May	Jun	Jul	Aug	Sep	Oct	Nov	Dec	Year
Record high °C (°F)	31.9 (89.4)	32.9 (91.2)	28.2 (82.8)	27.0 (80.6)	22.8 (73.0)	17.0 (62.6)	14.1 (57.4)	18.0 (64.4)	21.4 (70.5)	25.3 (77.5)	26.2 (79.2)	32.8 (91.0)	32.9 (91.2)
Mean daily maximum °C (°F)	16.1 (61.0)	16.3 (61.3)	13.5 (56.3)	10.0 (50.0)	6.7 (44.1)	3.4 (38.1)	3.1 (37.6)	3.8 (38.8)	5.7 (42.3)	8.2 (46.8)	10.9 (51.6)	13.7 (56.7)	9.3 (48.7)
Daily mean °C (°F)	10.8 (51.4)	11.0 (51.8)	8.5 (47.3)	5.8 (42.4)	3.4 (38.1)	1.0 (33.8)	0.2 (32.4)	1.0 (33.8)	2.1 (35.8)	4.0 (39.2)	6.2 (43.2)	8.8 (47.8)	5.2 (41.4)
Mean daily minimum °C (°F)	5.2 (41.4)	5.5 (41.9)	3.9 (39.0)	2.1 (35.8)	0.7 (33.3)	−1.3 (29.7)	−2.3 (27.9)	−1.9 (28.6)	−1.2 (29.8)	0.1 (32.2)	1.6 (34.9)	3.7 (38.7)	1.3 (34.3)
Record low °C (°F)	−3.3 (26.1)	−2.0 (28.4)	−2.8 (27.0)	−6.8 (19.8)	−8.4 (16.9)	−11.5 (11.3)	−13.0 (8.6)	−11.1 (12.0)	−11.3 (11.7)	−9.0 (15.8)	−5.6 (21.9)	−3.3 (26.1)	−13.0 (8.6)
Average precipitation mm (inches)	188 (7.4)	156 (6.1)	193 (7.6)	321 (12.6)	447 (17.6)	608 (23.9)	545 (21.5)	539 (21.2)	320 (12.6)	303 (11.9)	285 (11.2)	266 (10.5)	4,171 (164.2)
Source: AIC

== History ==
It is named after Cardinal Antonio Samorè, who mediated in the Beagle conflict between Chile and Argentina from 1978 to 1983. Operation Soberanía, the Argentine invasion plan, considered an offensive of the Third Army Corps under command of Luciano Benjamín Menéndez through Samoré Pass to seize Los Lagos Region.

Before it was renamed, it was known as Paso Puyehue after Puyehue Lake.
