= Casablanca (volcano) =

Mountain in Chile

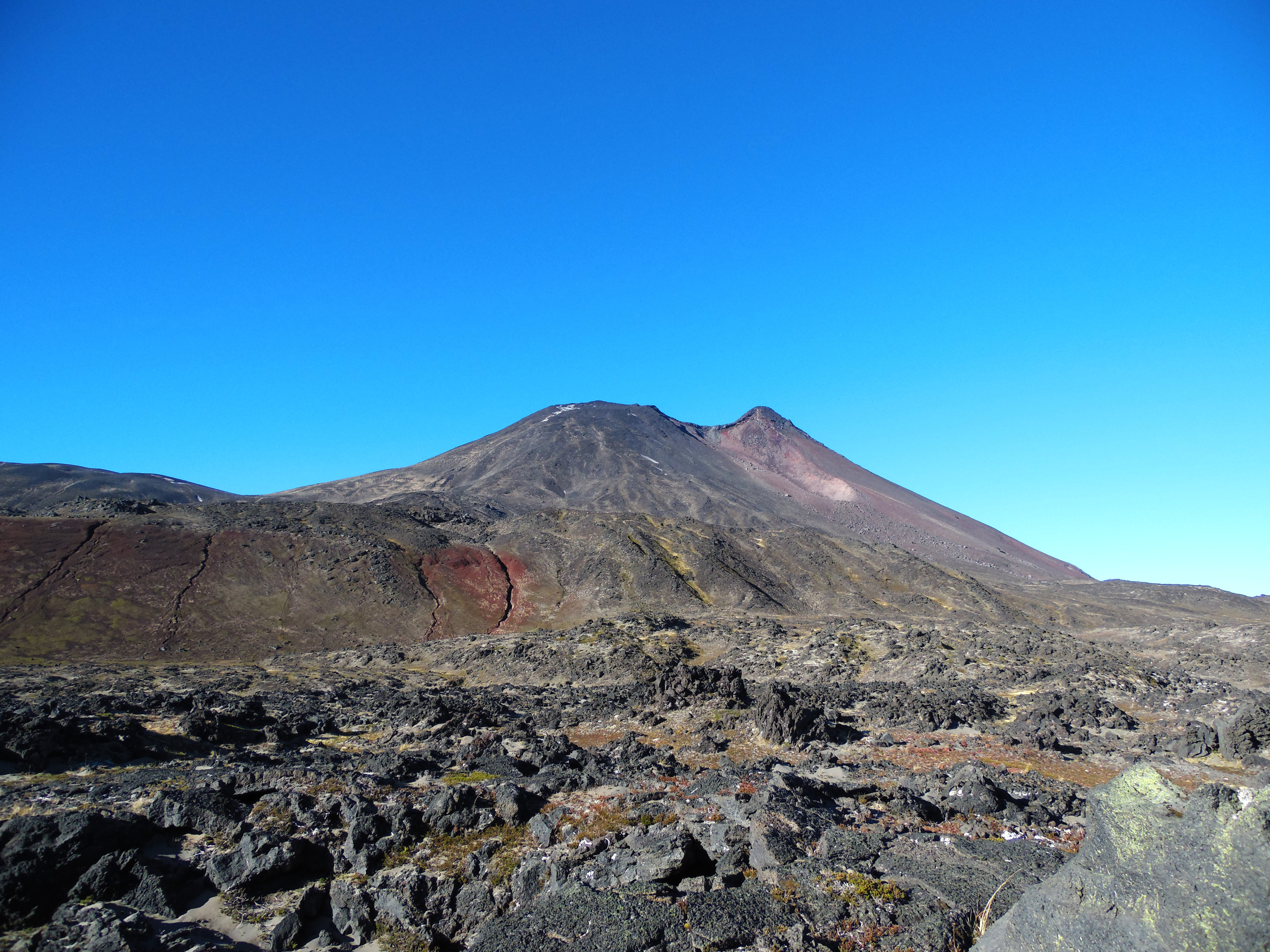
- Casablanca volcano in May 2016

Highest point
- Elevation: 1,990 m (6,530 ft)
- Coordinates: 40°46′30″S 72°09′23″W

Geography
- Location: Puyehue, Chile
- Parent range: Andes

Geology
- Mountain type: Stratovolcano
- Volcanic zone: South Volcanic Zone

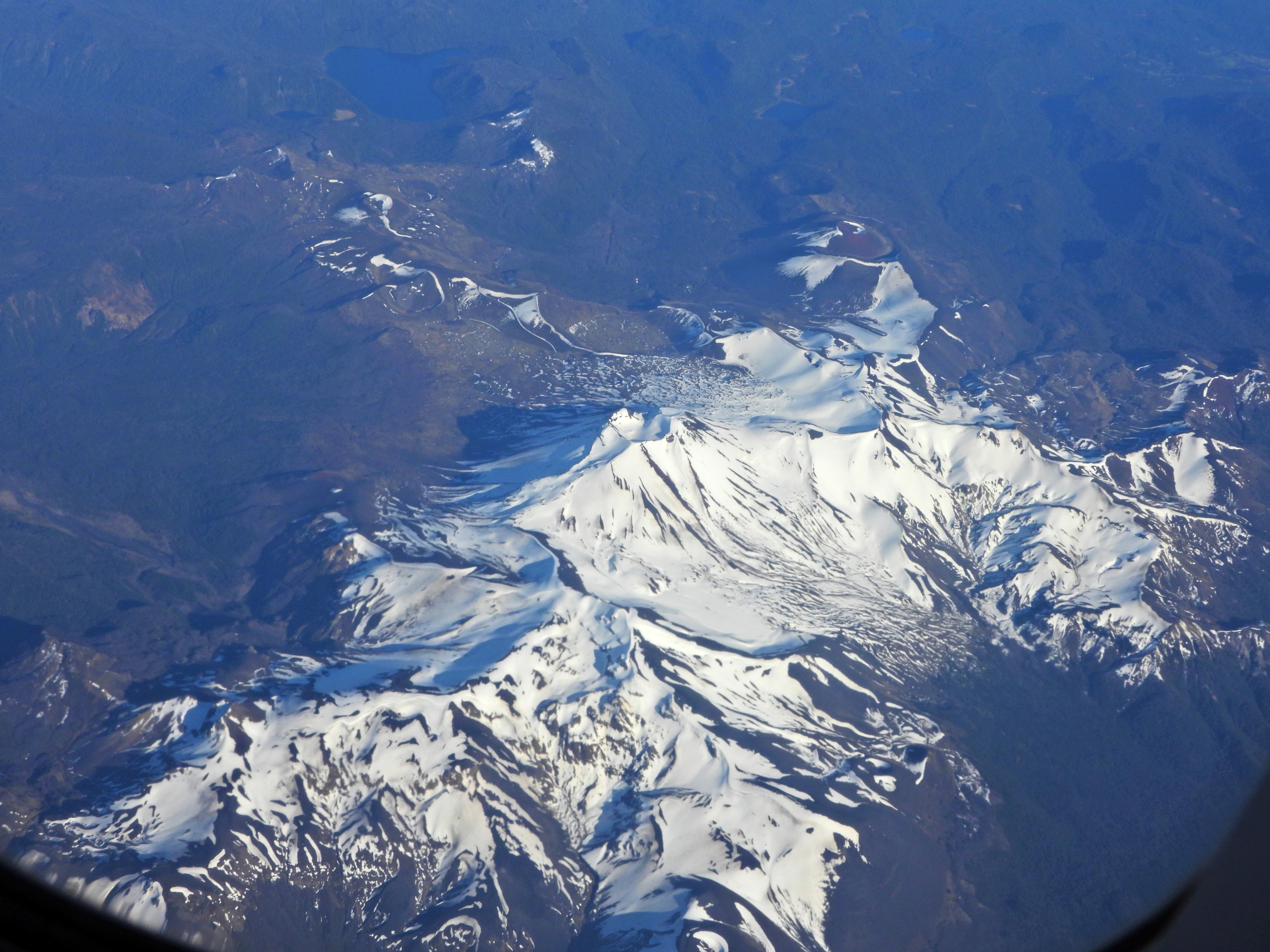
Casablanca volcano and numerous pyroclastic cones in the vicinity. Seen from air towards west.

Casablanca (Spanish pronunciation: [kasaˈβlaŋka]) is a Holocene stratovolcano in the Andes of Los Lagos Region, Chile. It is located about 90 km east of the city of Osorno and host on its slopes the Antillanca ski resort. The complex erupted lavas with composition between basalt and andesite and has no recorded historical eruptions. Several scoria cones formed after the last ice age.
