= Puyehue Lake =

Lake in Chile

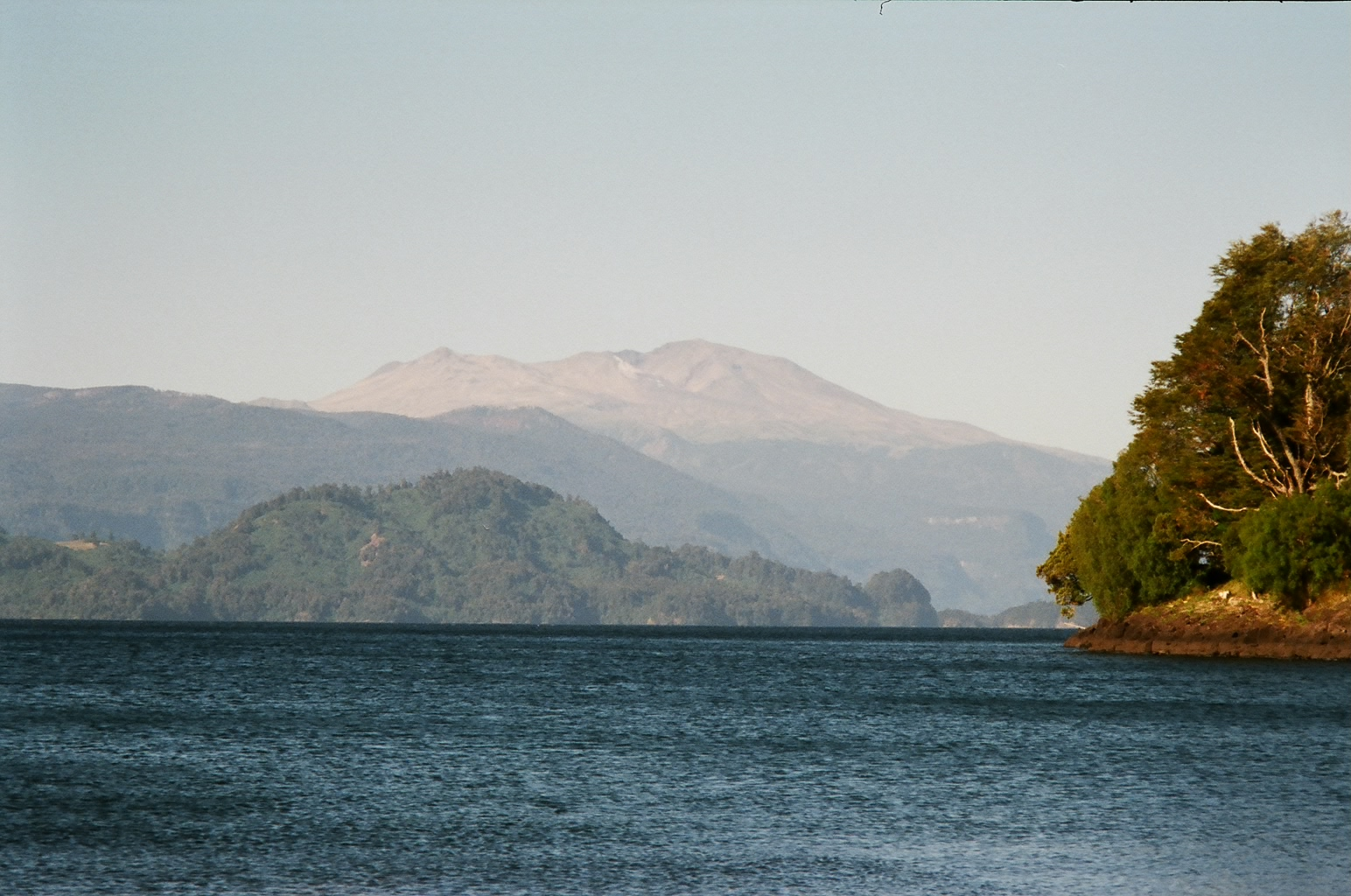
- View of the lake with Puyehue volcano in the background

- Location within Los Lagos
- Location: Ranco Province and Osorno Province
- Coordinates: 40°41′01″S 72°27′46″W
- Primary inflows: Golgol River
- Primary outflows: Pilmaiquén River
- Catchment area: 15,124 km^{2} (5,839 sq mi)
- Basin countries: Chile
- Max. length: 23 km (14 mi)
- Max. width: 11.5 km (7.1 mi)
- Surface area: 165.4 km^{2} (63.9 sq mi)
- Average depth: 76 m (249 ft)
- Max. depth: 123 m (404 ft)
- Water volume: 12.6 km^{3} (3.0 cu mi)
- Surface elevation: 188 m (617 ft)
- Islands: Fresia Island, Cuicui Islands
- Settlements: Entre Lagos
- References: Cuenca del río Bueno

Puyehue Lake (Spanish pronunciation: [puˈjewe]), (Mapudungun: puye, "small fish" and hue, "place") is an Andean piedmont lake on the border of Los Lagos Region with Los Ríos Region of Chile.

Puyehue is a lake of glacial origin. Several times during the Pleistocene glaciations, the lake depression was occupied by a large glacial lobe of the Patagonian Ice Sheet, which formed a series of moraines along its western shore. The lake has an east–west elongated shape with Fresia Island in the middle and two minor peninsulas pointing toward the island, one from the north and one from the south. The lake has a remarkably smooth shoreline, with only one inlet of significance: Futacullín Bay on the south. Entre Lagos at the western end is the only town on the lake.

As with most other lakes of southern Chile, Puyehue Lake acts as a sediment trap for material from the Andes. Sediment cores taken from Puyehue Lake in 2001 and 2002 have been interpreted as supporting the existence of the Little Ice Age in the Southern Hemisphere. A longer sediment core from the same site was used to reconstruct the evolution of the lake and its drainage basin during the last 18,000 years.

At the time the glacier occupying the Puyhue basin had retreated during deglaciation as to calv at a proglacial Puyehue Lake the glacier at Rupanco basin (40°49' S) was at its maximum extent. For a time meltwater from the Rupanco glacier flowed north into Puyehue Lake.

The 2011–2012 Puyehue-Cordón Caulle eruption polluted the Golgol River, a source of the lake, killing fish. Pyroclastic material reached Puyehue Lake through river transport, which resulted in the deposition of a layer of volcanic ash at the bottom of the lake.

Topography of the region. The Puyehue-Cordón Caulle massif is located between Ranco and Puyehue Lake

In the 16th century the lake was known to the Spanish as Llobén, from the Huilliche word of llofën meaning "abundant and continuous rain."
