= List of rivers of Los Lagos Region =

The information regarding List of rivers in the Los Lagos Region on this page has been compiled from the data supplied by GeoNames. It includes all features named "Rio", "Canal", "Arroyo", "Estero" and those Feature Code is associated with a stream of water. (Note: The arbitrarily selected codes are RPDS, CHN, CNLA, CNLB, CNLD, CNLI, CNLN, CNLSB, CRKT, DTCH, DTCHI, DTCHD, ESTY, FORD, SBED, STM, STMA, STMB, STMC, STMD, STMH, STMI, STMIX, STMM, STMQ, STMS, STMSB, STMX, TNLC, WTRC, WTRH) This list contains 755 water streams.

== Content ==
This list contains:

1. Name of the stream, in Spanish
2. Coordinates are latitude and longitude of the feature in ± decimal degrees, at the mouth of the stream
3. Link to a map including the Geonameid (a number which uniquely identifies a Geoname feature)
4. Feature code explained in
5. Other names for the same feature, if any
6. Basin countries additional to Chile, if any

== List ==
(Bueno River flows in the Los Ríos Region, but some tributaries flows also in the Los Lagos Region. For overview we repeat here the complete Bueno Drainage system, and the simple rivers that cross the regions)

- Río Bueno • 40.2446°S 73.71389°W • 3897808 • STM (Lagos R.)

- Río Caunahue • 40.17997°S 72.26226°W • 3896119 • STM
- Río Calcurrupe • 40.22078°S 72.26722°W • 3897326 • STM • (Rio Calcurrupe, Río Calcurrupe)

- Río Pillanleufu • 40.24679°S 72.03362°W • 3875985 • STM
- Río Hueinahue • 40.31291°S 71.98693°W • 3887716 • STM

- Río Nilahue • 40.25713°S 72.25122°W • 3878648 • STM • (Rio Milahue, Rio Nilahue, Río Milahue, Río Nilahue)

- Río Contrafuerte • 40.40554°S 72.0828°W • 3893707 • STM
- Los Venados

- Río Riñinahue • 40.33164°S 72.24283°W • 3873157 • STM
- Río Pilmaiquén • 40.35021°S 73.12851°W • 3875964 • STM (+Los Lagos R.)

- Río Golgol • 40.67632°S 72.34018°W • 3888948 • STM • (Gol-gol) • (Los Lagos R.)

- Río Rahue • 40.33945°S 73.31569°W • 3873850 • STM • (Los Lagos R.)

- Estero Pichi Damas • 40.57219°S 73.14603°W • 3876275 • STM • (Estero Pichi Damas, Rio Damas, Río Damas) • (Los Lagos R.)

(All in Los Lagos Region)

- Estero La Poza • 40.50762°S 72.89218°W • 3884921 • STM
- Río Chinchin • 40.67023°S 72.626°W • 3895029 • STM
- Estero Puquitrahue • 40.94394°S 73.54924°W • 3874621 • STM
- Río Maipué • 40.97883°S 73.25273°W • 3880976 • STM
- Estero de la Plata • 41.00303°S 73.58946°W • 3875664 • STM
- Río Toro • 41.0117°S 73.36175°W • 3869544 • STM
- Estero Pitildeo • 41.02049°S 73.33142°W • 3875763 • STM • (Estero Pilildeo, Estero Pitildeo)
- Estero La Junta • 41.02305°S 73.21815°W • 3885543 • STM
- Estero Collihuinco • 41.04726°S 73.60794°W • 3894189 • STM
- Río Maule • 41.06314°S 73.44043°W • 3880303 • STM
- Río Puntiagudo • 41.0783°S 72.25045°W • 3874702 • STM
- Estero Huempelen • 41.1218°S 73.57827°W • 3887692 • STM
- Río La Plata • 41.15°S 73.7°W • 3884976 • STM
- Estero Manga de Millar • 41°S 73.21667°W • 3880720 • STM • (Estero Manga, Estero Manga de Millar) • (CL)
- Río Puelo • 41.65°S 72.31667°W • 3840186 • STM • (Rio Puelo, Río Puelo) • (CL)
- Río Manso • 41.73333°S 72.1°W • 3844969 • STM • (Rio Manso, Río Manso) • (CL)
- Estero Seco • 42.47955°S 72.33614°W • 3871057 • STM
- Río Barceló • 42.48551°S 72.3053°W • 3898771 • STM
- Río Engaño • 43.72589°S 71.7802°W • 3890083 • STM
- Estero Traillen • 39.45322°S 73.20601°W • 3869362 • STM
- Estero Zallel • 39.55528°S 71.84376°W • 3867585 • STM
- Estero Correltué • 39.58454°S 72.46095°W • 3893463 • STM • (Estero Coreltue, Estero Correltue, Estero Correltué)
- Río de San José • 39.59696°S 73.13908°W • 3872084 • STM
- Estero Nalalguaca • 39.6325°S 72.53701°W • 3879080 • STM • (Estero Nalalguaca, Estero Nalalguaco)
- Estero Minas • 39.66491°S 72.59964°W • 3879816 • STM
- Río Calquinco • 39.69721°S 71.90868°W • 3897217 • STM • (Estero Calquinco, Rio Calquinco, Río Calquinco)
- Río Reiguaico • 39.70119°S 71.88558°W • 3873533 • STM
- Estero Niltre • 39.71261°S 72.20861°W • 3878637 • STM • (Estero Niltre, Estero Nitre)
- Río Ñancul • 39.7156°S 72.40844°W • 3879045 • STM
- Río Conguil • 39.72039°S 72.24674°W • 3893778 • STM
- Estero Llamue • 39.73312°S 72.18401°W • 3883002 • STM • (Estero Llamue, Estero Llamus)
- Río Tranguil • 39.74677°S 71.95569°W • 3869326 • STM
- Río Llizán • 39.75412°S 71.81231°W • 3882866 • STM • (Rio Lizan, Rio Llizan, Río Lizán, Río Llizán)
- Río Cuacua • 39.77329°S 71.96204°W • 3893223 • STM • (Rio Cuacua, Rio Cuaeua, Río Cuacua)
- Río Pugñr • 39.77354°S 72.13302°W • 3874902 • STM
- Rio Cruces (Santuario) • 39.77635°S 73.25752°W • 6459020 • STM
- Estero Chanchan • 39.80115°S 71.95084°W • 3895512 • STM
- Rio Valdivia • 39.82495°S 73.25495°W • 6459011 • STMS
- Canal Haverbeck • 39.83385°S 73.25692°W • 6459007 • CNLB
- Río Piedra Blanca • 39.87721°S 73.12792°W • 3876130 • STM
- Estero Minas • 39.89314°S 73.44738°W • 3879815 • STM
- Río Santo Domingo • 39.91026°S 73.15693°W • 3871312 • STM
- Río San Juan • 39.92711°S 73.3873°W • 3872009 • STM
- Estero Guape • 39.93001°S 73.52222°W • 3888391 • STM
- Río Catrileufu • 39.95265°S 73.39966°W • 3896140 • STM
- Estero del Peuco • 39.95554°S 73.31949°W • 3876393 • STM
- Estero Hueicolla • 40.14581°S 73.64239°W • 3887721 • STM • (Rio Hueicolla, Río Hueicolla) • (CL)
- Río Lameguapi • 40.20184°S 73.7081°W • 3885358 • STM
- Estero Carimáhuida • 40.23302°S 73.69125°W • 3896657 • STM
- Estero Las Ánimas • 40.24405°S 73.67669°W • 3884641 • STM • (Estero Las Animas, Estero Las Ánimas, Rio Las Animas, Río Las Animas)
- Estero Dahue • 40.26209°S 73.73067°W • 3892762 • STM
- Estero Lañinagual • 40.26816°S 73.45658°W • 3885227 • STM
- Río Los Patos • 40.28981°S 73.54654°W • 3881621 • STM
- Estero Paragua • 40.29863°S 73.74966°W • 3877220 • STM
- Río Calminahua • 40.30812°S 73.44327°W • 3897224 • STM • (Rio Calminahua, Rio Calminahue, Río Calminahua, Río Calminahue)
- Río Molino de Oro • 40.31992°S 73.58032°W • 3879587 • STM • (Estero Molino de Oro, Rio Molino de Oro, Río Molino de Oro)
- Estero Traiguén • 40.32531°S 73.00541°W • 3869374 • STM • (Estero Traiguen, Estero Traiguén, Rio Chirri, Río Chirri)
- Estero Tregua Traiguén • 40.33306°S 73.30789°W • 3869250 • STM
- Río Llollehue • 40.33531°S 73.11462°W • 3882857 • STM • (Rio Llollehue, Rio Llollelhue, Río Llollehue, Río Llollelhue)
- Río Lilcopulli • 40.33671°S 73.3552°W • 3883234 • STM
- Río Trahuilco • 40.34005°S 73.73937°W • 3869388 • STM
- Río Zehuilauquén • 40.35168°S 73.7476°W • 3867518 • STM
- Estero Pocopio • 40.35423°S 73.45162°W • 3875567 • STM
- Estero Tromen • 40.36717°S 73.29654°W • 3869054 • STM
- Río San Pablo • 40.37711°S 73.04195°W • 3871860 • STM
- Estero Forrahue • 40.38506°S 72.97931°W • 3889402 • STM • (Estero Farrahue, Estero Forrahue)
- Estero Quihue • 40.388°S 73.75388°W • 3874278 • STM
- Estero Dollinco • 40.39657°S 73.14027°W • 3892327 • STM
- Estero Roble • 40.41068°S 73.14243°W • 3873015 • STM
- Río Chirri • 40.43952°S 72.91525°W • 3894966 • STM • (Rio Chirre, Rio Chirri, Río Chirre, Río Chirri)
- Estero Huillinco • 40.45002°S 73.60341°W • 3887533 • STM
- Estero Caracol • 40.46352°S 73.13171°W • 3896794 • STM
- Estero Trufún • 40.48078°S 73.75032°W • 3869011 • STM
- Estero Coinco • 40.49753°S 73.27009°W • 3894373 • STM
- Estero Chapilcahuín • 40.50104°S 73.04102°W • 3895429 • STM
- Estero Folilco • 40.51437°S 73.3763°W • 3889414 • STM
- Estero Cunamo • 40.51485°S 73.37571°W • 3892983 • STM
- Estero Remehue • 40.52628°S 73.10824°W • 3873491 • STM
- Estero Forrahue • 40.52971°S 73.26984°W • 3889401 • STM • (Estero Ferrahue, Estero Forrahue)
- Río Llesquehue • 40.53782°S 73.71405°W • 3882910 • STM
- Estero Cuinco • 40.54527°S 73.16965°W • 3893082 • STM • (Estero Coinco, Estero Cuinco, Estero Cuyinco, Riachuelo de Coyunco)
- Estero Concagua • 40.55918°S 73.21719°W • 3893898 • STM
- Río Tranallaquín • 40.55935°S 73.71966°W • 3869347 • STM
- Río Damas • 40.56667°S 73.15°W • 3892749 • STM
- Estero Pilauco • 40.56939°S 73.14378°W • 3876019 • STM
- Estero Melileufu • 40.56997°S 73.26923°W • 3880116 • STM
- Estero Polloico • 40.57307°S 73.0121°W • 3875506 • STM
- Estero La Ovejería • 40.57493°S 73.14237°W • 3885172 • STM
- Río Lutún • 40.57687°S 73.10155°W • 3881149 • STM
- Estero Cinico • 40.59756°S 73.17381°W • 3894618 • STM
- Estero Pichi-Coihueco • 40.59962°S 73.176°W • 3876290 • STM
- Estero Lumaco • 40.60144°S 73.30128°W • 3881172 • STM
- Río Muicolpué • 40.60341°S 73.74156°W • 3879218 • STM • (Riachuello Muicolpue, Riachuello Muicolpué, Rio Muicolpue, Río Muicolpué)
- Estero Tijeral • 40.62374°S 73.05254°W • 3869855 • STM
- Río Negro • 40.63224°S 73.18764°W • 3878780 • STM • (Rio Negro, Rio Negro Hueco, Río Negro, Río Negro Hueco)
- Estero Futa Coihueco • 40.64611°S 73.21504°W • 3889226 • STM
- Río Licán • 40.64774°S 72.41216°W • 3883267 • STM
- Río Pajarito • 40.66085°S 72.12808°W • 3877710 • STM
- Río Bonito • 40.6636°S 71.91167°W • 3898068 • STM
- Río Anticura • 40.66465°S 72.17884°W • 3899549 • STM
- Estero Molino • 40.66909°S 73.12588°W • 3879600 • STM
- Estero Huillín • 40.67464°S 72.88347°W • 3887543 • STM
- Río Moro • 40.67907°S 72.85437°W • 3879325 • STM
- Río Chanleufú • 40.67988°S 72.3389°W • 3895456 • STM
- Estero Gajardo • 40.68657°S 73.02791°W • 3889206 • STM
- Estero El Manzano • 40.68906°S 72.33432°W • 3891074 • STM • (Estero El Manzano, Rio Malalcura, Río Malalcura)
- Estero Pitril • 40.69588°S 73.79628°W • 3875751 • STM
- Estero Hueyelhue • 40.69732°S 73.80903°W • 3887584 • STM • (Estero Hueyelhue, Rio Hueyelhue, Río Hueyelhue)
- Estero Chioca • 40.6981°S 72.70815°W • 3894994 • STM
- Río Pichi-Chonleufu • 40.69875°S 72.3327°W • 3876296 • STM
- Estero Cashicue • 40.6989°S 73.20994°W • 3896292 • STM
- Estero Sagllúe • 40.69938°S 73.2108°W • 3872649 • STM • (Estero Llagllue, Estero Llagllúe, Estero Sagllue, Estero Sagllúe)
- Estero Pichil • 40.70957°S 73.01652°W • 3876260 • STM
- Estero Pescadores • 40.7136°S 72.40672°W • 3876440 • STM
- Estero Putraiguén • 40.71449°S 73.05987°W • 3874555 • STM
- Estero Pichi-Lag • 40.71494°S 72.48476°W • 3876259 • STM
- Río Verde • 40.71585°S 73.68792°W • 3868412 • STM
- Estero Nilque • 40.71824°S 72.43966°W • 3878638 • STM
- Estero Huilma • 40.71864°S 73.21912°W • 3887520 • STM • (Estero Huelma, Estero Huilma)
- Río Chanchan • 40.72483°S 73.00506°W • 3895511 • STM
- Estero Pichul • 40.73015°S 72.42202°W • 3876216 • STM
- Estero Pangua • 40.73434°S 73.7461°W • 3877380 • STM
- Estero Carpa • 40.74006°S 72.25851°W • 3896557 • STM
- Estero Chahuico • 40.74038°S 73.1981°W • 3895671 • STM
- Estero Putame • 40.74726°S 73.18274°W • 3874565 • STM
- Los Tres Esteros • 40.74772°S 73.27848°W • 3881311 • STM
- Estero Salca • 40.74796°S 73.18267°W • 3872577 • STM
- Estero Millantué • 40.74901°S 73.59918°W • 3879877 • STM
- Río Chifin • 40.75371°S 73.23118°W • 3895160 • STM • (Estero Chitin, Rio Chifin, Rio Chufin, Río Chifin, Río Chufin)
- Estero Negro • 40.76546°S 73.55817°W • 3878810 • STM
- Río Cholguaco • 40.76845°S 73.80804°W • 3895627 • STM • (Rio Chalguaco, Rio Chalhuaco, Río Chalguaco, Río Chalhuaco) • (CL)
- Estero Huillín • 40.76926°S 72.65727°W • 3887542 • STM
- Río Forrahue • 40.77074°S 73.21626°W • 3889400 • STM
- Río Coihueco • 40.77148°S 72.95264°W • 3894386 • STM
- Estero del Encanto • 40.77967°S 72.88867°W • 3890103 • STM • (Estero del Encanta, Estero del Encanto)
- Río Pescadero • 40.78158°S 72.50727°W • 3876454 • STM • (Estero Pescadero, Rio Pescadero, Río Pescadero)
- Río Coihueco • 40.78416°S 72.48253°W • 3894385 • STM
- Estero Rafunco • 40.78844°S 73.16953°W • 3873858 • STM
- Estero Huillinco • 40.78961°S 73.18724°W • 3887532 • STM
- Estero El Encanto • 40.79032°S 72.44479°W • 3891410 • STM • (Estero Buyinco, Estero El Encanto)
- Estero Llay-Llay • 40.79257°S 73.21858°W • 3882923 • STM
- Estero Los Riscos • 40.79757°S 73.55518°W • 3881402 • STM
- Río Negro • 40.79974°S 72.68364°W • 3878779 • STM
- Estero Ulmuco • 40.80561°S 73.27302°W • 3868831 • STM
- Estero Riachuelo • 40.81104°S 73.2955°W • 3873340 • STM
- Estero Huillín • 40.81292°S 72.92196°W • 3887541 • STM
- Estero Huanteleufu • 40.81716°S 73.13062°W • 3887770 • STM
- Estero Rodriguero • 40.8192°S 73.50834°W • 3872951 • STM
- Estero La Cascada • 40.82005°S 72.4061°W • 3886314 • STM • (Estero La Cascada, Estero de la Cascada)
- Estero Ruful • 40.82082°S 72.17419°W • 3872715 • STM
- Estero El Salto • 40.82131°S 72.38636°W • 3890431 • STM
- Estero Piedras Altas • 40.82454°S 72.16881°W • 3876083 • STM
- Río Moro • 40.82667°S 72.39478°W • 3879324 • STM
- Estero Coligual • 40.83124°S 72.91483°W • 3894268 • STM
- Estero Huillinco • 40.83488°S 72.38014°W • 3887531 • STM
- Estero Lliuco • 40.84025°S 73.2903°W • 3882874 • STM
- Estero Calzoncillo • 40.84639°S 72.34652°W • 3897194 • STM
- Estero Lindero • 40.85416°S 73.20645°W • 3883152 • STM
- Estero Los Baños • 40.85923°S 72.22745°W • 3882366 • STM • (Estero Los Banos, Estero Los Baños, Estero de los Banos, Estero de los Baños)
- Estero Casa Blanca • 40.86342°S 72.19503°W • 3896408 • STM
- Río Colorado • 40.86645°S 72.7987°W • 3894026 • STM
- Río Blanco • 40.86743°S 73.28787°W • 3898207 • STM
- Estero Coique • 40.86847°S 72.26365°W • 3894345 • STM
- Estero Venado • 40.86911°S 72.86724°W • 3868508 • STM
- Estero Huillinco • 40.87041°S 72.8272°W • 3887530 • STM
- Estero Choroico • 40.87232°S 72.84156°W • 3894856 • STM
- Estero Nochaco • 40.87337°S 72.88932°W • 3878584 • STM
- Río Gaviotas • 40.87347°S 72.1823°W • 3889044 • STM
- Río Pichicoihueco • 40.87388°S 72.78843°W • 3876289 • STM
- Estero Pichi Llay-Llay • 40.8832°S 73.21123°W • 3876251 • STM
- Estero Agua Fría • 40.88381°S 72.18754°W • 3900479 • STM
- Río Aguas Malas • 40.8842°S 72.15556°W • 3900409 • STM
- Río Callao • 40.88621°S 72.34236°W • 3897259 • STM
- Río Bonito • 40.88794°S 72.46473°W • 3898067 • STM
- Estero del Crucero • 40.88812°S 73.28581°W • 3893264 • STM • (Estero Del Crucero, Estero del Crucero)
- Estero Pescado • 40.88827°S 72.1946°W • 3876449 • STM
- Río Lliuco • 40.88969°S 73.85155°W • 3882873 • STM • (Estero Guaguan, Rio Lliuco, Río Lliuco)
- Río Nalcas • 40.89182°S 72.33011°W • 3879074 • STM
- Río Blanco • 40.89303°S 72.22486°W • 3898206 • STM
- Estero Futa • 40.89757°S 73.208°W • 3889228 • STM
- Estero Población • 40.90821°S 72.749°W • 3875598 • STM
- Río Quilque • 40.90912°S 73.07265°W • 3874089 • STM
- Río Coñico • 40.91403°S 73.10916°W • 3893765 • STM
- Estero Las Minas • 40.91609°S 73.44728°W • 3884161 • STM
- Estero Picaso • 40.91895°S 73.06124°W • 3876329 • STM
- Estero La Palizada • 40.91944°S 73.0621°W • 3885166 • STM
- Río San Pedro • 40.9212°S 73.84952°W • 3871790 • STM
- Estero del Ñadi • 40.92823°S 73.34584°W • 3879115 • STM
- Estero Mañuca • 40.93031°S 73.25178°W • 3880643 • STM
- Estero Agua Buena • 40.93501°S 72.60841°W • 3900574 • STM
- Río Pichicope • 40.93574°S 72.6833°W • 3876284 • STM
- Río Guayusca • 40.93934°S 73.86612°W • 3888296 • STM • (Riachuelo Guayusca, Rio Guayusca, Rio Huayusca, Río Guayusca, Río Huayusca)
- Estero Curaco • 40.94773°S 72.68633°W • 3892918 • STM
- Estero Piedras • 40.94978°S 73.55117°W • 3876092 • STM
- Estero Chingue • 40.95634°S 73.55973°W • 3895009 • STM
- Estero Ganso • 40.9594°S 73.04114°W • 3889137 • STM
- Río Blanco • 40.95962°S 72.61043°W • 3898205 • STM
- Estero Paso Malo • 40.96554°S 73.24404°W • 3877082 • STM
- Estero Pampa Bonita • 40.97679°S 73.57016°W • 3877483 • STM
- Estero Coihueco • 40.97896°S 73.31724°W • 3894387 • STM
- Río López • 40.97897°S 73.25174°W • 3882503 • STM
- Estero Potrerillo de las Yeguas • 40.98705°S 73.35709°W • 3875322 • STM
- Estero de los Capados • 40.98762°S 73.35641°W • 3896854 • STM
- Estero de la Expedición • 40.99603°S 73.41039°W • 3889657 • STM
- Río Nihué • 41.00302°S 73.19312°W • 3878659 • STM
- Río Burro • 41.00392°S 73.1928°W • 3897688 • STM • (Estero El Burro, Rio Burro, Río Burro)
- Río Negro • 41.00662°S 72.57705°W • 3878778 • STM
- Estero Sin Nombre • 41.00887°S 72.62932°W • 8047818 • STM
- Estero Puma • 41.00975°S 72.72265°W • 3874850 • STM
- Estero Cancha Rayada • 41.00983°S 73.18497°W • 3896996 • STM
- Río Maule • 41.01115°S 73.36111°W • 3880304 • STM
- Estero La Poza • 41.01667°S 73.5°W • 3884920 • STM
- Estero La Huella • 41.01894°S 73.47698°W • 3885634 • STM
- Estero del Medio • 41.02388°S 73.21767°W • 8047623 • STM
- Estero El Pescado • 41.02938°S 73.13446°W • 3876448 • STM • (Estero El Pescado, Estero Pescado)
- Estero La Guacha • 41.02999°S 73.13479°W • 3885637 • STM • (Estero La Guacha, Estero La Huacha)
- Estero de la Laguna • 41.04645°S 73.6078°W • 3885787 • STM
- Estero Burro Chico • 41.04693°S 73.10859°W • 3897687 • STM
- Río Blanco Arenal • 41.04837°S 72.67296°W • 3898204 • STM • (Rio Blanco, Rio Blanco Arenal, Río Blanco, Río Blanco Arenal)
- Río Peulla • 41.04979°S 72.02525°W • 3876386 • STM
- Estero Pilildeo • 41.05°S 73.4°W • 3875997 • STM
- Estero El Zanjón • 41.05°S 72.66667°W • 3890156 • STM
- Río Negro • 41.05539°S 72.02607°W • 3878777 • STM
- Estero La Piedra • 41.05749°S 73.40696°W • 3885017 • STM
- Río Cañal • 41.05833°S 73.39672°W • 3897038 • STM
- Estero Huillín • 41.05972°S 72.6646°W • 8047817 • STM
- Río San Luis • 41.06023°S 73.9332°W • 3871940 • STM
- Río Techado • 41.06182°S 72.13842°W • 3870056 • STM
- Estero La Arena • 41.06375°S 73.41613°W • 3886534 • STM
- Estero La Vega • 41.0675°S 73.41569°W • 3883570 • STM
- Estero Las Marias • 41.07889°S 72.64448°W • 8047816 • STM
- Estero López Chico • 41.08333°S 73.21667°W • 3882502 • STM
- Estero Planchado • 41.0841°S 73.18734°W • 8047622 • STM
- Río Blanco Las Cascadas • 41.08924°S 72.63966°W • 8052899 • STM
- Estero Loma de Piedra • 41.09581°S 73.19739°W • 3882625 • STM • (Estero Loma de Piedra, Estero Lomo de la Piedra)
- Estero Centinela • 41.09676°S 73.20014°W • 3895965 • STM
- Estero Napaco • 41.10393°S 73.63429°W • 3879026 • STM
- Estero La Población • 41.10957°S 73.16399°W • 3884957 • STM
- Estero Esperanza • 41.11151°S 73.64582°W • 3889838 • STM • (Estero Esperanza, Rio Esperanza, Río Esperanza)
- Estero La Cascada • 41.11667°S 72.61667°W • 3886313 • STM • (Estero La Cascada, Estero la Cascada) • (CL)
- Estero del Jardín • 41.12232°S 73.57733°W • 3886953 • STM
- Estero La Guacha • 41.13026°S 73.32677°W • 3885815 • STM
- Estero Los Pellines • 41.13635°S 73.28868°W • 3881606 • STM
- Estero La Ballena • 41.13706°S 73.28992°W • 3886521 • STM • (Estero Ballena, Estero La Ballena)
- Estero Polizones • 41.13894°S 73.3218°W • 3875516 • STM
- Río Blanco • 41.13973°S 72.08169°W • 3898202 • STM
- Estero Robles • 41.14314°S 73.40642°W • 3873003 • STM
- Estero Mirales • 41.14402°S 73.53313°W • 3879713 • STM
- Estero Alvarado • 41.14404°S 73.41059°W • 3899863 • STM
- Estero Agua Fría • 41.14422°S 73.30808°W • 3900478 • STM
- Río Cochino • 41.15°S 73.68333°W • 3894493 • STM • (Rio Cocaino, Rio Cochino, Río Cocaino, Río Cochino) • (CL)
- Estero de la Compañía • 41.1566°S 73.35281°W • 3893948 • STM
- Estero La Cofiana • 41.15998°S 73.21145°W • 8047621 • STM
- Río Pario • 41.16006°S 73.63285°W • 3877165 • STM
- Río Huayusca • 41.16866°S 73.67289°W • 3887746 • STM • (Rio Guayusca, Rio Huayusca, Rio Hueyusca, Río Guayusca, Río Huayusca, Río Hueyusca)
- Río Maitén • 41.18333°S 73.73333°W • 3880958 • STM
- Río San Juan • 41.18713°S 73.88411°W • 3872008 • STM
- Estero Kuschel • 41.18981°S 73.12583°W • 3886588 • STM • (Estero Kuschel, Estero Kuschet)
- Estero Chaquihue • 41.1953°S 73.52887°W • 3895400 • STM
- Río Pato • 41.19755°S 73.53052°W • 3876991 • STM
- Río de Las Caulles • 41.20174°S 73.46186°W • 3884497 • STM • (Rio de Las Caulles, Rio de las Caulles, Río de Las Caulles, Río de las Caulles)
- Estero El Molino • 41.20363°S 73.44103°W • 3890978 • STM
- Estero Piuchén • 41.21558°S 73.52043°W • 3875740 • STM
- Río del Norte • 41.21647°S 71.96629°W • 3878508 • STM
- Río Tepual • 41.21667°S 72.58333°W • 3869966 • STM
- Río Pequeño • 41.21667°S 71.95°W • 3876588 • STM
- Río Juliet • 41.21667°S 72.61667°W • 3886738 • STM
- Río Frío • 41.21667°S 73.73333°W • 3889286 • STM
- Río Parga • 41.21797°S 73.48674°W • 3877176 • STM
- Estero Pozo de Oro • 41.22165°S 73.42433°W • 3875230 • STM
- Río Tepú • 41.22167°S 72.59535°W • 8047813 • STM • (Rio Tepu, Rio de la Nutria, Río Tepú, Río de la Nutria)
- Estero Piedra • 41.223°S 72.73489°W • 3876149 • STM
- Estero El Salto • 41.22388°S 72.65674°W • 3872506 • STM • (Estero El Salto, Estero del Salto)
- Río Blanco • 41.22413°S 72.62531°W • 3898203 • STM
- Estero Cuervo • 41.22461°S 72.60788°W • 8047814 • STM
- Río Colorado • 41.23333°S 72.6°W • 3894025 • STM • (Rio Colorado, Rio Nutria, Río Colorado, Río Nutria) • (CL)
- Río Bariloche • 41.2374°S 72.13162°W • 3898755 • STM
- Río La Esperanza • 41.24415°S 72.05471°W • 3885995 • STM • (Rio La Esperanza, Rio de la Esperanza, Río La Esperanza, Río de la Esperanza)
- Río del Salto • 41.24435°S 72.44571°W • 3872501 • STM
- Estero Copihue • 41.24631°S 72.58982°W • 8047815 • STM
- Estero Quillín • 41.2526°S 73.1794°W • 3874126 • STM
- Río Amancay • 41.25534°S 73.45937°W • 3899843 • STM
- Estero Sin Nombre • 41.25554°S 72.57857°W • 8048578 • STM
- Río Blanco • 41.25897°S 72.47851°W • 3898201 • STM
- Río Hueñu-Hueñu • 41.25962°S 72.47875°W • 3887639 • STM • (Rio Hueno Hueno, Rio Huenu-Huenu, Río Hueño Hueño, Río Hueñu-Hueñu)
- Río La Apancora • 41.26181°S 72.70013°W • 8048585 • STM
- Río Plata • 41.26236°S 72.70046°W • 8048584 • STM
- Río de los Patos • 41.26246°S 72.45928°W • 3876980 • STM
- Estero Pichilaguna • 41.26952°S 73.10301°W • 8047997 • STM
- Río La Cimbra • 41.27°S 72.03205°W • 3886244 • STM • (Rio La Cimbra, Rio la Cimbra, Río La Cimbra, Río la Cimbra)
- Río Frío • 41.27491°S 73.45299°W • 3889285 • STM • (Estero Las Minas, Rio Frio, Río Frío)
- Río Cachimba • 41.2782°S 72.26765°W • 3897514 • STM
- Río Sin Nombre • 41.27858°S 72.73153°W • 8048587 • STM
- Río Sur • 41.27918°S 72.7648°W • 3876445 • STM • (Rio Pescado del Sur, Rio Sur, Río Pescado del Sur, Río Sur)
- Río Concha • 41.28193°S 72.24498°W • 3893884 • STM • (Rio Concha, Rio Huenohueno, Río Concha, Río Huenohueno)
- Estero Puentes • 41.28333°S 72.83333°W • 3875014 • STM
- Río de La Poza • 41.28333°S 72.83333°W • 3884916 • STM
- Río Camahueto • 41.28428°S 72.82974°W • 3897192 • STM • (Rio Camahueto, Rio Tempe, Río Camahueto, Río Tempe)
- Río Llico • 41.291°S 73.84354°W • 3882893 • STM
- Estero Torres • 41.30053°S 73.33855°W • 3869499 • STM
- Río Ñadi • 41.31087°S 73.48139°W • 3879114 • STM • (Rio Nade, Rio Nadi, Río Ñade, Río Ñadi)
- Estero Esperanza • 41.31203°S 73.53317°W • 3889837 • STM
- Río Quitacalzones • 41.31965°S 72.18544°W • 3873915 • STM
- Estero del Molino • 41.32353°S 73.28092°W • 3879595 • STM
- Río Toro • 41.3315°S 73.75889°W • 3869543 • STM
- Río Pupitrén • 41.33333°S 73.83333°W • 3874670 • STM
- Río Chaquiguan • 41.33333°S 73.78333°W • 3895401 • STM
- Estero de los Colhuines • 41.3°S 73.53333°W • 3894285 • STM
- Río Caliente • 41.3°S 72.56667°W • 3897271 • STM
- Río Cuesta Alta • 41.35016°S 72.70794°W • 8048588 • STM
- Estero Casitas • 41.35095°S 73.35018°W • 3896282 • STM • (Estero Casita, Estero Casitas)
- Estero Largo • 41.35132°S 73.13184°W • 8047996 • STM
- Río Las Marcas • 41.35642°S 72.74186°W • 8048589 • STM
- Río Reloncaví • 41.3594°S 72.27472°W • 3873505 • STM
- Estero Coipo • 41.36233°S 73.48832°W • 3894362 • STM
- Estero Los Arcos • 41.36597°S 73.39098°W • 3882412 • STM
- Río Putratrau • 41.36667°S 73.85°W • 3874553 • STM
- Estero Lamedi • 41.36667°S 73.36667°W • 3885361 • STM
- Río Sin Nombre • 41.36678°S 73.1635°W • 3870831 • STM
- Río Colegual • 41.3673°S 73.16289°W • 3894289 • STM • (Rio Colegual, Rio Coligual, Río Colegual)
- Río Venado • 41.36997°S 72.77809°W • 8048493 • STM
- Río Chepa • 41.37064°S 72.77814°W • 3895265 • STM
- Río Los Patos • 41.37075°S 72.7886°W • 8048494 • STM
- Río de la Paloma • 41.37416°S 73.35128°W • 3877559 • STM
- Río Botella • 41.37585°S 72.57538°W • 8048579 • STM
- Río Amarillo • 41.37609°S 72.57631°W • 3899799 • STM
- Estero Agua Buena • 41.37776°S 73.0822°W • 3900573 • STM
- Río Petrohué • 41.38079°S 72.3104°W • 3876409 • STM • (Rio Petrohue, Río Petrohué)
- Estero Molino • 41.38333°S 73.33333°W • 3879599 • STM
- Río Calabozo • 41.38664°S 73.19244°W • 3897360 • STM
- Río del Este • 41.38816°S 72.28462°W • 3889729 • STM
- Estero Pisagua • 41.39303°S 73.17266°W • 8047994 • STM
- Río Cordillera • 41.39345°S 73.61873°W • 3893579 • STM
- Estero Mañío • 41.39395°S 73.61821°W • 3880698 • STM
- Estero Arrayán • 41.39661°S 72.92416°W • 3899306 • STM • (Estero Arrayan, Estero Arrayán, Rio Arrayan, Río Arrayan)
- Estero El Mañío • 41.40004°S 73.07758°W • 3880699 • STM • (Estero El Manio, Estero El Mañío, Estero Manio, Estero Mañío)
- Río Negro • 41.40383°S 73.12501°W • 3878776 • STM
- Río de los Oyarzos • 41.40413°S 73.2771°W • 3877887 • STM • (Rio Oyarzo, Rio de los Oyarzos, Río Oyarzo, Río de los Oyarzos)
- Río Bernardina • 41.40517°S 73.68622°W • 3898418 • STM
- Río Pato • 41.40518°S 72.82698°W • 8048497 • STM
- Río Correntoso • 41.40521°S 72.82602°W • 8048496 • STM
- Estero Lobos • 41.40609°S 73.01472°W • 3882781 • STM • (Estero Lobos, Rio Arenas, Rio Lobo, Río Arenas, Río Lobo)
- Estero Valverde • 41.40736°S 72.09507°W • 3868618 • STM
- Río Traidor • 41.4087°S 72.11041°W • 3869387 • STM
- Río El Arco • 41.40874°S 72.07862°W • 3891958 • STM
- Río Pichiblanco • 41.40941°S 72.61742°W • 8048582 • STM
- Río Coihue • 41.40996°S 72.51822°W • 8048576 • STM
- Estero La Junta • 41.41045°S 72.125°W • 3885542 • STM • (Estero La Junta, Rio La Junta, Río La Junta)
- Río La Peña • 41.41148°S 72.52729°W • 8048489 • STM
- Estero El Rosario • 41.41186°S 73.21181°W • 8047995 • STM
- Río Cañones • 41.41199°S 73.83544°W • 3896894 • STM
- Río Sin Nombre • 41.41501°S 72.54686°W • 8048488 • STM
- Río Cajonmó • 41.41667°S 73.7°W • 3897378 • STM
- Río Negro • 41.41915°S 72.4966°W • 3878775 • STM
- Río Este • 41.42138°S 72.5538°W • 3889730 • STM
- Río Colorado • 41.4262°S 72.59648°W • 8048583 • STM
- Estero Chávez • 41.42682°S 72.8983°W • 8048498 • STM
- Estero El Trapén • 41.43333°S 73.01667°W • 3890226 • STM
- Estero El Roble • 41.43423°S 73.0079°W • 8047993 • STM
- Río Blanco • 41.43515°S 72.59248°W • 3898200 • STM
- Estero La Tranca • 41.4°S 73.18333°W • 3883677 • STM
- Río Chico • 41.4°S 72.58333°W • 3895177 • STM
- Estero Boecho • 41.4°S 73.26667°W • 3898143 • STM
- Río Oroco • 41.44058°S 72.77428°W • 8048492 • STM
- Estero Antamó • 41.44078°S 72.73121°W • 8048591 • STM
- Río Frío • 41.44439°S 72.59937°W • 8048581 • STM
- Estero San Antonio • 41.44502°S 72.72193°W • 8048590 • STM
- Río Playa Blanca • 41.4466°S 72.55585°W • 8048486 • STM
- Río Oscuro • 41.44741°S 73.26062°W • 3877956 • STM
- Río Chico • 41.4477°S 72.82076°W • 3895176 • STM
- Río Rollizo • 41.45163°S 72.32616°W • 3872917 • STM
- Estero Arena • 41.45339°S 73.02007°W • 3899409 • STM
- Río Negro • 41.45°S 73.26667°W • 3878774 • STM
- Río Chico • 41.45°S 72.73333°W • 3895175 • STM
- Río Cululir • 41.4547°S 72.30402°W • 3893012 • STM • (Rio Cuculin, Rio Cululin, Rio Cululir, Río Cuculin, Río Cululir)
- Río El Gato • 41.46144°S 73.25048°W • 3889064 • STM • (Rio El Gato, Rio Gato, Río El Gato, Río Gato)
- Río Correntoso • 41.46239°S 72.69796°W • 3893460 • STM
- Río Chaqueigua • 41.46325°S 73.24082°W • 3895404 • STM • (Rio Chaqueigua, Rio Chaqueihua, Río Chaqueigua, Río Chaqueihua)
- Estero Colorado • 41.46667°S 73.25°W • 3894051 • STM
- Río Coihuín • 41.46667°S 72.68333°W • 3894382 • STM
- Río La Culebra • 41.47437°S 73.22462°W • 8047992 • STM
- Río Colorado • 41.47504°S 73.22504°W • 3894024 • STM • (Estero Colorado, Rio Colorado, Río Colorado)
- Estero Pichipilluco • 41.47555°S 72.92244°W • 8048499 • STM
- Río Chinchiguapi • 41.47602°S 73.26678°W • 3895037 • STM • (Estero Chinchiguapi, Rio Chinchiguapi, Río Chinchiguapi)
- Río Pangal • 41.4761°S 72.66226°W • 3877394 • STM • (Estero Pangal, Rio Pangal, Río Pangal)
- Río Oscuro del Salto • 41.47691°S 73.33576°W • 3877953 • STM • (Rio Oscuro, Rio Oscuro del Salto, Río Oscuro, Río Oscuro del Salto)
- Río Tenglo • 41.48333°S 72.98333°W • 3869991 • STM
- Río Cárcamo • 41.48481°S 73.71227°W • 3896747 • STM
- Río de La Zorra • 41.48499°S 72.82529°W • 3867492 • STM • (Estero de la Zorra, Rio de La Zorra, Río de La Zorra)
- Estero Pilluco • 41.48749°S 72.89956°W • 3875975 • STM
- Estero Negro • 41.48837°S 72.82295°W • 8048491 • STM
- Río Quenuir • 41.49314°S 73.7113°W • 3874370 • STM
- Estero Molino • 41.49366°S 73.47611°W • 3879598 • STM
- Río del Este • 41.49408°S 72.25866°W • 3889728 • STM
- Río Toledo • 41.49544°S 73.33191°W • 3869685 • STM
- Río Coihuín • 41.49963°S 72.84459°W • 3895587 • STM • (Rio Chamiza, Rio Coihuin, Río Chamiza, Río Coihuín)
- Río Palihue • 41.50166°S 73.68008°W • 3877622 • STM
- Río Cochamó • 41.50213°S 72.28488°W • 3894501 • STM • (Rio Cochamo, Rio Concha, Río Cochamó, Río Concha)
- Río Ostiones • 41.5047°S 73.37277°W • 3877938 • STM
- Río Gómez • 41.50833°S 73.33073°W • 3888929 • STM
- Río Leones • 41.5109°S 71.85501°W • 3883333 • STM
- Río Chelles • 41.51313°S 73.47532°W • 3895274 • STM
- Río Taylor • 41.51571°S 73.07396°W • 8048516 • STM • (Rio Taylor, Río Taylor)
- Río Guarne • 41.51667°S 73.43333°W • 3888349 • STM
- Río Blanco • 41.51667°S 73.81667°W • 3898199 • STM
- Río Témpanos • 41.51972°S 72.54338°W • 8047933 • STM
- Arroyo Quemado • 41.52116°S 71.87416°W • 3874402 • STM
- Estero Misquihué • 41.53333°S 73.48333°W • 3879680 • STM
- Río Barranco • 41.53622°S 71.96096°W • 3898711 • STM
- Río Chinquiu • 41.5°S 73.01667°W • 3894998 • STM • (Rio Chincui, Rio Chinquiu, Río Chincui, Río Chinquiu) • (CL)
- Río de Piedra • 41.54705°S 73.20002°W • 8048519 • STM • (Rio de Piedra, Río de Piedra)
- Estero Tranca • 41.55°S 73.45°W • 3869341 • STM
- Río Morros • 41.55°S 71.96667°W • 3879286 • STM
- Río Correntoso • 41.55°S 71.95°W • 3893459 • STM • (Arroyo Correntoso, Rio Correntoso, Río Correntoso) • (CL)
- Río Cululil • 41.56143°S 73.64031°W • 3893014 • STM
- Estero Montriel • 41.56622°S 72.72859°W • 8047868 • STM
- Estero Chillcon • 41.56762°S 73.47108°W • 3895078 • STM
- Río Paredes • 41.57177°S 73.43231°W • 3877190 • STM
- Estero Guada • 41.57231°S 73.19658°W • 8048520 • STM • (Estero Guada)
- Río Tambor • 41.57247°S 73.43302°W • 3870189 • STM
- Estero Teñio • 41.57752°S 73.42447°W • 3869982 • STM
- Río Olmopulli • 41.5812°S 73.49799°W • 3878076 • STM
- Río Avellano • 41.58333°S 73.68333°W • 3899099 • STM
- Río Cebadal • 41.58359°S 73.49953°W • 3896046 • STM
- Estero Metri • 41.58544°S 72.70077°W • 3895665 • STM • (Estero Chaicamo, Estero Chaícamo, Estero Metri, Rio Chaicamo, Río Chaicamó) • (CL)
- Río Trapén • 41.58959°S 73.12029°W • 3890225 • STM • (Estero El Trapen, Estero El Trapén, Rio Trapen, Río Trapén) • (CL)
- Río Puelpun • 41.59304°S 73.5712°W • 3875028 • STM
- Estero Chaula • 41.60044°S 72.68809°W • 8047870 • ESTY
- Río Chaica • 41.60824°S 72.69206°W • 3895666 • STM • (Rio Chaica, Rio Chaula, Rio Chauta, Río Chaica, Río Chaula, Río Chauta)
- Río Maullín • 41.60852°S 73.66756°W • 3880300 • STM
- Río del Peñol • 41.61288°S 73.51746°W • 3876635 • STM
- Río Apretura • 41.61634°S 72.2021°W • 3899483 • STM
- Río Cariquilda • 41.61687°S 73.58727°W • 3896654 • STM
- Río de La Máquina • 41.62072°S 73.50606°W • 3885391 • STM • (Rio de La Maquina, Rio de la Maquina, Río de La Máquina, Río de la Máquina)
- Río Lenca • 41.62118°S 72.66892°W • 3883401 • STM
- Río Astil • 41.62208°S 73.33225°W • 3899211 • STM
- Río El Vado • 41.62912°S 73.39082°W • 3890198 • STM
- Río del Rey • 41.64623°S 73.65925°W • 3873353 • STM
- Río Chilca • 41.64726°S 73.56218°W • 3895133 • STM
- Río Puelo Chico • 41.65102°S 72.29923°W • 3875030 • STM
- Río San Pedro Nolasco • 41.65717°S 73.6622°W • 3871773 • ESTY
- Estero Cholhue • 41.66469°S 72.97018°W • 8047827 • ESTY
- Río Huelmo • 41.66664°S 73.0675°W • 8048593 • STM
- Río Poiguén • 41.66667°S 73.56667°W • 3875549 • STM
- Río Ollero • 41.66667°S 73.06667°W • 3878080 • STM • (Rio Corhuio, Rio Ollero, Río Corhuio, Río Ollero) • (CL)
- Río Galpones • 41.66667°S 73.53333°W • 3889154 • STM
- Río Steffen • 41.66749°S 71.95456°W • 3870566 • STM
- Estero Quetrulauquén • 41.6717°S 72.94359°W • 8047828 • ESTY
- Río Blanco • 41.67518°S 72.35842°W • 3898198 • STM
- Arroyo Puquitrín • 41.67667°S 73.66631°W • 3874620 • STM
- Estero Chencoihue • 41.68099°S 72.9907°W • 8047826 • ESTY
- Estero Matanzas • 41.68285°S 73.42572°W • 3880351 • STM • (Estero Matanzas, Rio Matanzas, Río Matanzas)
- Río de las Cumbres • 41.68317°S 73.42437°W • 3893002 • STM
- Río Curahué • 41.68333°S 73.7°W • 3892910 • STM • (Arroyo Curahue, Rio Curahue, Río Curahué) • (CL)
- Río Chilco • 41.68949°S 72.5171°W • 3895125 • STM • (Rio Chilco, Rio Chileo, Río Chilco, Río Chileo)
- Estero Rulo • 41.6969°S 73.09016°W • 3872703 • STM • (Estero Rulo, Rio Rulo, Río Rulo) • (CL)
- Río Frío • 41.69767°S 71.98388°W • 3889284 • STM
- Río Chucahue • 41.70511°S 72.99903°W • 8047823 • STM
- Estero del Molino • 41.70785°S 73.15006°W • 3879590 • ESTY • (Estero Huito, Estero del Molino, Molino, Rio del Molino, Río del Molino) • (CL)
- Estero Cuitúe • 41.70984°S 72.59705°W • 8047859 • STM
- Río San José • 41.71315°S 73.25452°W • 3872087 • STM
- Río Llaguepe • 41.72156°S 72.48698°W • 3883045 • STM • (Rio Llaguepe, Rio Llahuape, Rio Llahuepe, Río Llaguepe, Río Llahuape, Río Llahuepe)
- Río de La Máquina • 41.72564°S 73.22302°W • 3880574 • STM • (Rio Maquina, Rio de La Maquina, Río Máquina, Río de La Máquina) • (CL)
- Río Mazazo • 41.73593°S 72.53424°W • 3880262 • STM • (Rio Mazaso, Rio Mazazo, Río Mazaso, Río Mazazo)
- Estero Yale • 41.74527°S 73.19069°W • 8048522 • STM • (Estero Yale)
- Río Chaparano • 41.74626°S 72.56979°W • 3895440 • STM
- Estero Putun • 41.75066°S 73.1136°W • 8048487 • STM
- Estero Aullar • 41.75169°S 73.12901°W • 8048559 • STM
- Río Puelche • 41.75416°S 72.66112°W • 3875036 • STM
- Río El Dao • 41.76389°S 73.24849°W • 3891509 • STM
- Río Astillero • 41.76454°S 73.59314°W • 3899205 • STM
- Río Manihueico • 41.76456°S 72.67894°W • 3880705 • STM
- Estero Quinched • 41.76487°S 73.08007°W • 8049582 • ESTY • (Estero Quinched)
- Río Lenqui • 41.76667°S 73.63333°W • 3883388 • STM
- Estero Molin • 41.76764°S 73.15528°W • 8049583 • STM • (Estero Molin)
- Estero Collihué • 41.77122°S 73.41165°W • 3894191 • STM • (Estero Collihue, Estero Collihué, Estero de Codihue, Estero de Codihué)
- Río Aucha • 41.7727°S 73.34311°W • 3899155 • STM • (Rio Aucha, Rio Aucho, Río Aucha)
- Estero San Antonio • 41.77316°S 73.23287°W • 8048599 • STM
- Río Ahinco • 41.77333°S 73.54002°W • 3900357 • STM • (Rio Ahinco, Rio Llanco, Río Ahinco, Río Llanco)
- Estero Tenco • 41.7745°S 73.24112°W • 8048598 • STM
- Río Traidor • 41.77597°S 72.03627°W • 3869386 • STM
- Río La Manga • 41.77775°S 72.6913°W • 8047911 • STM • (Rio La Manga, Río La Manga)
- Estero La División • 41.78333°S 72°W • 3886090 • STM
- Río Máquina • 41.79062°S 73.5039°W • 3880573 • STM
- Río Contao • 41.79182°S 72.71281°W • 3893717 • STM
- Estero Caicaén • 41.79613°S 73.18508°W • 8049279 • STM • (Estero Caicaen, Estero Caicaén)
- Estero Alvarado • 41.79693°S 73.06112°W • 8048607 • STM
- Estero Los Cristales • 41.79728°S 71.99848°W • 3882114 • STM
- Río Chico • 41.79959°S 73.01998°W • 3895174 • STM
- Estero Chucagua • 41.80165°S 73.07235°W • 8048638 • STM
- Río Zambo • 41.80241°S 72.71491°W • 8047908 • STM
- Río Puñin • 41.80591°S 72.73103°W • 8047909 • STM
- Estero Sin Nombre • 41.81088°S 73.04949°W • 8048745 • STM
- Río Pollollo • 41.81192°S 73.00676°W • 3875505 • STM
- Estero Chauquiar • 41.82188°S 73.04481°W • 8538084 • STM
- Río Guyunden • 41.82644°S 73.6227°W • 3888228 • STM
- Estero Chagual • 41.83481°S 72.78559°W • 3895681 • STM • (Estero Chagual, Rio Chagual, Rio Chaque, Río Chagual, Río Chaque)
- Río Negro • 41.83749°S 71.97814°W • 3878773 • STM
- Río del Alerce • 41.83999°S 71.97836°W • 3900189 • STM
- Estero Ñico • 41.8452°S 72.61267°W • 8048004 • STM • (Estero Nico, Estero Ñico)
- Estero La Poza • 41.84815°S 72.78334°W • 8594194 • STM
- Estero Huicha • 41.84886°S 73.73463°W • 3887574 • STM • (Estero Huicha, Rio Huicha)
- Estero Quildaco • 41.8726°S 72.79189°W • 3874231 • STM
- Canal Aulén • 41.88173°S 72.82073°W • 8048011 • CHN
- Río Manao • 41.8819°S 73.53274°W • 3880748 • STM
- Estero Mui • 41.88449°S 72.79446°W • 8048010 • STM
- Río Quito • 41.88599°S 73.95911°W • 3873907 • STM
- Estero del Ded • 41.88639°S 73.12728°W • 8048748 • ESTY • (Estero del Ded) • (CL)
- Estero Hueihué • 41.89683°S 73.51479°W • 3887718 • STM
- Río Pudeto • 41.91414°S 73.75482°W • 3875058 • ESTY
- Río Desaguadero • 41.91667°S 71.93333°W • 3892641 • STM
- Río Pudelle • 41.92496°S 74.00363°W • 3875060 • STM
- Río Huillinco • 41.92988°S 73.71319°W • 3887526 • STM
- Río Llanco • 41.93115°S 73.74373°W • 3969599 • STM
- Río Mechaico • 41.93749°S 73.80949°W • 3880249 • STM
- Río Quetén • 41.94093°S 72.80244°W • 8048037 • STM
- Río Negro • 41.94861°S 72.44611°W • 3969707 • STM
- Río San Antonio • 41.9525°S 73.79934°W • 3969851 • STM
- Río Mayamo • 41.95°S 73.78333°W • 3880283 • STM
- Río Coquiao • 41.95603°S 73.79236°W • 3969853 • STM
- Río Blanco • 41.95778°S 72.41917°W • 3969706 • STM
- Río Negro • 41.96105°S 73.75684°W • 3878769 • STM
- Río Negro • 41.96415°S 72.46364°W • 3878771 • STM
- Río Vilcún • 41.96667°S 73.75°W • 3868204 • STM
- Río Blanco • 41.97088°S 72.43771°W • 3898197 • STM
- Río Metrequen • 41.97318°S 73.51385°W • 3879958 • STM • (Rio Metrenque, Rio Metrenquen, Rio Metrequen, Río Metrenque, Río Metrenquen, Río Metrequen)
- Río Chauchil • 41.97544°S 72.79747°W • 3969641 • STM
- Estero El Varal • 41.97836°S 72.66121°W • 8048002 • STM • (Estero El Varal)
- Arroyo Ventisquero • 41.98333°S 71.93333°W • 3868474 • STM
- Río Queche • 41.98646°S 72.6676°W • 8047917 • STM • (Rio Queche, Río Queche)
- Arroyo Ventisquero • 41.98693°S 71.92212°W • 3868468 • STM
- Río Calonje • 41.9896°S 73.86673°W • 3897222 • STM
- Río Cheñiu • 42.0036°S 72.71803°W • 8047901 • STM • (Rio Cheniu, Río Cheñiu)
- Río Cisnes • 42.00478°S 72.66942°W • 3949880 • STM
- Estero Pichicolo • 42.00577°S 72.5868°W • 3876286 • STM • (Estero Pichicolo, Estero Pichicolu)
- Arroyo El Salto • 42.0086°S 72.0172°W • 3969810 • STM
- Río Vilcún • 42.01953°S 73.71602°W • 3868203 • STM • (Rio Luileu, Rio Vilcun, Río Vilcún)
- Río El Toro • 42.02149°S 72.11694°W • 3969809 • STM
- Estero El Nueve • 42.03622°S 73.68027°W • 3969595 • STM
- Río Chepu • 42.04469°S 74.02996°W • 3895248 • STM
- Río Puelo • 42.045°S 71.84028°W • 3969812 • STM
- Río Puntra • 42.04948°S 73.96722°W • 3874681 • STM
- Río Grande • 42.05093°S 73.9674°W • 3888775 • STM
- Río Cholgo • 42.06222°S 72.44889°W • 3969710 • STM
- Estero Aucho • 42.06753°S 73.42045°W • 3899148 • STM • (Estero Aucho, Rio Aucho, Río Aucho)
- Río Paila • 42.06772°S 73.68561°W • 3969591 • STM
- Arroyo Correntoso • 42.06778°S 71.82361°W • 3969815 • STM
- Río Tantauco • 42.08925°S 73.74961°W • 3870160 • STM
- Río Butalcura • 42.09085°S 73.94037°W • 3897666 • STM
- Río Universo • 42.09972°S 72.10139°W • 3969808 • STM
- Río Raquelita • 42.10417°S 72.22972°W • 3969806 • STM
- Río Coluco • 42.10751°S 73.92678°W • 3893989 • STM
- Río Tongoi • 42.11649°S 74.04383°W • 3869634 • STM • (Rio Tongoi, Rio Tongoy, Río Tongoi, Río Tongoy)
- Arroyo Barrancas • 42.11767°S 71.90853°W • 3898733 • STM
- Río Lar • 42.14324°S 74.04945°W • 3884838 • STM
- Río Refugio • 42.16757°S 74.08636°W • 3873551 • STM
- Río Mirta • 42.21333°S 72.28556°W • 3969805 • STM
- Río Batalcura • 42.21417°S 73.77667°W • 3969847 • STM
- Río Marilmó • 42.21667°S 72.52361°W • 3969697 • STM
- Río Metalqui • 42.21841°S 74.13688°W • 3879969 • STM
- Río Carinueico • 42.2438°S 73.77674°W • 3969588 • STM
- Río Pudidi • 42.24385°S 73.77761°W • 3969911 • STM
- Río Colú • 42.2448°S 73.36465°W • 3893991 • STM • (Estero Colu, Estero Colú, Rio Colu, Río Colú)
- Río Huequi • 42.25255°S 72.73985°W • 3887620 • STM • (Hueguetumao, Huehuetumao, Rio Hueguetamao, Rio Hueque, Rio Huequi, Río Huequi)
- Río Telele • 42.27234°S 72.52651°W • 3969695 • STM
- Río Quillaico • 42.28006°S 73.66771°W • 3874177 • STM
- Río Escondido • 42.30454°S 74.1442°W • 3889923 • STM
- Río Tocoihué • 42.30778°S 73.43326°W • 3969612 • STM
- Río de la Plata • 42.31574°S 74.12542°W • 3875661 • STM
- Río Curi • 42.32211°S 74.13293°W • 3892877 • STM
- Río Abtao • 42.32358°S 74.13384°W • 3900728 • STM
- Estero San Juan • 42.33448°S 73.50963°W • 3872022 • STM
- Río Ayacara • 42.3°S 72.78333°W • 3899082 • STM
- Río Huinal • 42.36417°S 72.40667°W • 3969714 • STM
- Río Lloncochaigua • 42.373°S 72.41939°W • 3882844 • STM • (Lloncochagua, Loncochaigue, Loncochaigüe, Quebrada de Lloncochallan, Rio Lloncochaigua, Rio Lloncochaigue, Rio Loncochallhua, Río Lloncochaigua, Río Lloncochaigüe, Río Loncochallhua)
- Río Puchabrán • 42.39023°S 73.8726°W • 3969909 • STM
- Río Ñango • 42.39693°S 74.16349°W • 3879042 • STM
- Río Buill • 42.41137°S 72.69719°W • 3897775 • STM • (Rio Buill, Rio Huell, Río Buill)
- Río Porcelana • 42.41803°S 72.44842°W • 3969717 • STM
- Río Lacaya • 42.44787°S 72.22058°W • 3969802 • STM
- Río Barceló • 42.45194°S 72.28111°W • 3969800 • STM
- Río Libertador • 42.45349°S 72.28426°W • 3969803 • STM
- Río Villatasmo • 42.46148°S 73.86487°W • 3868150 • STM
- Río Anay • 42.47178°S 74.17776°W • 3899742 • STM • (Rio Ahui, Rio Amay, Rio Anai, Rio Anay, Río Ahui, Río Anay)
- Río Troliguán • 42.47528°S 72.35611°W • 3969719 • STM
- Río Gamboa • 42.48149°S 73.77124°W • 3889142 • STM
- Río Reremo • 42.48303°S 72.36791°W • 3873410 • STM
- Río Vodudahué • 42.4834°S 72.40149°W • 3867992 • STM • (Rio Bodudahue, Rio Vodudahue, Rio de la Laja, Río Bodudahue, Río Vodudahué)
- Río Chico Nuevo • 42.49332°S 72.64905°W • 3969690 • STM
- Río Escala • 42.49444°S 72.15361°W • 3969798 • STM
- Río Cole-Cole • 42.50767°S 74.18418°W • 3894294 • STM
- Río Negro • 42.5175°S 72.80917°W • 3949879 • STM
- Estero Llicaldad • 42.52453°S 73.79711°W • 3882903 • STM
- Río Chico • 42.53472°S 72.25667°W • 3969797 • STM
- Río Checo • 42.53794°S 74.15389°W • 3895308 • STM • (Rio Checo, Rio Denal, Río Checo, Río Deñal)
- Río Hondo • 42.54028°S 72.81639°W • 3969643 • STM
- Estero Rauco • 42.54611°S 73.80076°W • 3873666 • STM
- Río Gonzalo • 42.56018°S 72.60274°W • 3969688 • STM
- Río Aquellas • 42.57437°S 72.83044°W • 3899481 • STM
- Río Reñihué • 42.57697°S 72.51417°W • 3969724 • STM
- Río Toro • 42.58333°S 73.9°W • 3869542 • STM
- Río Negro • 42.5875°S 72.47167°W • 3969723 • STM
- Río Dongo • 42.5883°S 73.89047°W • 3969582 • STM
- Río Cipresal • 42.59342°S 74.10213°W • 3969898 • STM
- Río Llin • 42.59522°S 73.89609°W • 3969908 • STM
- Río Huenue • 42.59643°S 73.78807°W • 3969907 • STM
- Río Collil • 42.60303°S 73.96046°W • 3969580 • STM
- Río Puchanquin • 42.60447°S 74.12764°W • 3875091 • STM
- Río Alcaldeo • 42.61728°S 73.91796°W • 3900254 • STM • (Alcadeo, Riachuelo Ancalevo, Rio Alcaldeo, Rio Alcaldes, Río Alcaldeo)
- Río Palpahuén • 42.64105°S 74.04824°W • 3877521 • STM
- Río Puritauquén • 42.6425°S 72.80083°W • 3969648 • STM • (Rio Puritauquen, Rio Quitacalzon, Río Puritauquén, Río Quitacalzon) • (CL)
- Río Quilque • 42.64829°S 74.05888°W • 3874088 • STM
- Río Blanco • 42.64888°S 72.49064°W • 3969725 • STM
- Estero Detif • 42.65528°S 73.55333°W • 3969874 • STM
- Río Contento • 42.65741°S 73.98357°W • 3893714 • STM
- Río Pañol • 42.66195°S 74.11896°W • 3877323 • STM
- Río Notué • 42.6631°S 73.92078°W • 3878480 • STM • (Rio Natue, Rio Natué, Rio Notue, Río Notué)
- Río Trañil • 42.66491°S 73.89782°W • 3869324 • STM
- Río Mayul • 42.66542°S 74.01276°W • 3880265 • STM
- Río Talcan • 42.66646°S 73.89679°W • 3870273 • STM
- Río Cauyahué • 42.66667°S 73.9°W • 3896089 • STM
- Río Cipreses • 42.6706°S 72.44142°W • 3894613 • STM • (Rio Cipreces, Rio Cipreses, Río Cipreces, Río Cipreses)
- Río Purilauquén • 42.67109°S 72.81294°W • 3874596 • STM • (Boca de Peirilauguen, Rio Purilauquen, Río Purilauquén)
- Río Cañalhué • 42.67446°S 73.89717°W • 3897028 • STM
- Río Negro • 42.68086°S 73.95496°W • 3878767 • STM
- Río Bravo • 42.68729°S 73.9327°W • 3897947 • STM
- Río Cuyuldeo • 42.69494°S 74.12006°W • 3892788 • STM
- Río Melilebú • 42.72674°S 73.95592°W • 3880117 • STM
- Río Torrentes • 42.73132°S 72.22621°W • 3869509 • STM
- Río Púlpito • 42.73595°S 73.94665°W • 3969904 • STM
- Río Negro • 42.74097°S 72.83708°W • 3878770 • STM
- Río Pumol • 42.74537°S 74.14168°W • 3874836 • STM
- Río Rayas • 42.76292°S 72.84928°W • 3873648 • STM • (Rio Blanco, Rio Rayas, Río Blanco, Río Rayas)
- Río Mercedes • 42.76762°S 74.15014°W • 3880027 • STM
- Río Libno • 42.78333°S 73.51667°W • 3883278 • STM • (Riachuelo Libno, Rio Libno, Río Libno) • (CL)
- Río Rayas • 42.79464°S 72.6979°W • 3969684 • STM
- Río Camahueto • 42.80428°S 72.8326°W • 3969682 • STM • (Rio Camahueto, Rio Vilcun, Río Camahueto, Río Vilcún)
- Estero Lebicán • 42.80808°S 73.61585°W • 3883458 • STM
- Río Reñihué • 42.82193°S 74.00883°W • 3873432 • STM
- Río Compu • 42.82967°S 73.74989°W • 3893941 • STM
- Río Maihueco • 42.82975°S 73.74868°W • 3881003 • STM
- Río Natri • 42.83911°S 73.74456°W • 3969870 • STM
- Río Molulco • 42.84139°S 73.73806°W • 3969902 • STM
- Río Catiao • 42.85021°S 74.14868°W • 3896157 • STM
- Río Mollueco • 42.85392°S 73.73857°W • 3879548 • STM
- Río Sur • 42.8575°S 73.94083°W • 3969573 • STM
- Río Mechai • 42.86405°S 73.4923°W • 3880251 • STM • (Estero Mechai, Rio Mechai, Rio Mechay, Río Mechai, Río Mechay)
- Río Michinmahuida • 42.86972°S 72.29861°W • 3969793 • STM
- Arroyo Compu • 42.87199°S 73.70003°W • 3893943 • STM
- Río Los Mallines • 42.87528°S 72.36472°W • 3969728 • STM
- Río Tablaruca • 42.90227°S 74.16928°W • 3870383 • STM
- Río Chaitén o Rio Blanco • 42.90552°S 72.69593°W • 3895639 • STM
- Río Negro • 42.93949°S 72.72158°W • 3969679 • STM
- Río Chadmo • 42.94224°S 73.6429°W • 3895693 • STM
- Río Yelcho • 42.95602°S 72.75527°W • 3867697 • STM • (Rio Diamante, Rio Yelcho, Río Yelcho)

- Río Futaleufú • 43.305°S 71.99833°W • 3855297 • STM • (Rio Fetaleufu, Rio Futalelfu, Rio Futaleufu, Río Fetaleufú, Río Futalelfú, Río Futaleufú) • (CL)

- Río Correntoso • 42.95714°S 74.20228°W • 3950408 • STM
- Río Medina • 42.96492°S 74.20276°W • 3880221 • STM
- Río San Antonio • 42.97146°S 73.6064°W • 3969865 • STM
- Río Huenocoihue • 43.03013°S 74.22626°W • 3887653 • STM
- Río Natri Pangal • 43.03062°S 74.11439°W • 3969892 • STM
- Río Amarillo • 43.07611°S 72.50177°W • 3899798 • STM
- Río Alerce • 43.07836°S 72.53408°W • 3969677 • STM
- Río Palvitad • 43.08197°S 72.72463°W • 3877496 • STM • (Rio Palbitad, Rio Palvitad, Río Palbitad, Río Palvitad)
- Río Mirador • 43.08401°S 74.30532°W • 3879737 • STM
- Río Yaldad • 43.09417°S 73.73123°W • 3867763 • STM
- Río Minchinmávida • 43.10825°S 72.47974°W • 3879798 • STM • (Rio Michimahuida, Rio Minchinmavida, Río Michimahuida, Río Minchinmávida)
- Río Espolón • 43.11309°S 72.02648°W • 3969792 • STM
- Río Blanco • 43.11332°S 72.02779°W • 3969790 • STM
- Río Chaiguata • 43.13095°S 73.7537°W • 3895656 • STM • (Rio Chaiguala, Rio Chaiguata, Río Chaiguala, Río Chaiguata)
- Río Cenizas • 43.1361°S 72.03514°W • 3969788 • STM
- Río de la Zorra • 43.1441°S 74.32131°W • 3867487 • STM • (Rio de La Zorra, Rio de la Zorra, Río de La Zorra, Río de la Zorra)
- Río Tigre • 43.16463°S 72.01228°W • 3969787 • STM
- Río Alealebu • 43.16576°S 73.74562°W • 3900209 • STM
- Río Frío • 43.17343°S 72.4409°W • 3889283 • STM
- Arroyo Bellavista • 43.17853°S 71.88849°W • 3969818 • STM
- Río del Noreste • 43.18894°S 71.90054°W • 3878543 • STM
- Río Chico • 43.19699°S 71.81236°W • 3969821 • STM
- Río Jopla • 43.20216°S 73.75138°W • 3886872 • STM
- Río Espolón • 43.20518°S 71.9147°W • 7116110 • STM
- Río Pabellón • 43.22418°S 74.37637°W • 3877865 • STM
- Río Waag • 43.2°S 71.8°W • 3867954 • STM
- Arroyo Quila Seca • 43.24022°S 71.88115°W • 3874234 • STM
- Río Yelcho Chico • 43.24332°S 72.36532°W • 3867695 • STM
- Río Correntoso • 43.25054°S 72.30987°W • 3969786 • STM
- Río Corcovado • 43.25727°S 72.93289°W • 3893588 • STM • (Rio Colorado, Rio Corcovado, Rio Corobado, Río Colorado, Río Corcovado)
- Estero Guamblad • 43.28504°S 73.87565°W • 3888508 • STM • (Estero Guambiad, Estero Guamblad, Rio Huamblad)
- Río de La Mina • 43.30304°S 72.80699°W • 3969652 • STM
- Río Negro • 43.31199°S 73.03455°W • 3878768 • STM
- Río Azulado • 43.31479°S 71.97155°W • 3899026 • STM
- Río Azul • 43.31505°S 71.97132°W • 3969785 • STM
- Río Gil de Lemos • 43.31694°S 73.04353°W • 3949985 • STM
- Río Quilán • 43.32442°S 74.23821°W • 3874248 • STM
- Río Canelo • 43.3286°S 72.81337°W • 3896932 • STM • (Rio Canelo, Rio Canelos, Río Canelo)
- Río Quilanlar • 43.34611°S 74.03278°W • 3969568 • STM
- Arroyo Blanco • 43.34665°S 72.01299°W • 3969824 • STM
- Estero Cascada • 43.35076°S 72.19786°W • 3896311 • STM
- Río Quilantar • 43.35287°S 74.02972°W • 3874243 • STM • (Rio Quilanlar, Rio Quilantar, Río Quilanlar, Río Quilantar)
- Río Turbio • 43.3554°S 72.74408°W • 3868884 • STM
- Río Robles • 43.35586°S 73.00854°W • 3969654 • STM
- Río Inio • 43.36091°S 74.1328°W • 3887175 • STM
- Río Asasao • 43.36124°S 73.97494°W • 3899253 • STM
- Río Sucio • 43.37096°S 72.70793°W • 3870504 • STM
- Río del Norte • 43.37262°S 72.62238°W • 3878507 • STM
- Río Nevado • 43.39008°S 72.67781°W • 3878709 • STM
- Río Ayentema • 43.40037°S 73.81594°W • 3899074 • STM
- Estero Julepe • 43.40622°S 72.089°W • 3969783 • STM
- Río Verde • 43.41005°S 72.66941°W • 3868411 • STM
- Río Canev • 43.4154°S 73.057°W • 3896954 • STM • (Rio Canef, Rio Canev, Río Canef, Río Canev)
- Río Salto • 43.41569°S 73.04212°W • 3872502 • STM
- Río Seco • 43.44111°S 72.73083°W • 3969676 • STM
- Río Menor • 43.46185°S 72.58261°W • 3880049 • STM
- Río Malito • 43.47279°S 72.12219°W • 3880855 • STM • (Rio Malito, Rio Melita, Río Malito, Río Melita)
- Arroyo Enredaderas • 43.47338°S 72.12031°W • 3890072 • STM • (Arroyo Enredadera, Arroyo Enredaderas, Estero Enredadera, Estero Enredaderas)
- Río El Azul • 43.48876°S 72.12357°W • 3891923 • STM • (Rio Azul, Rio El Azul, Río Azul, Río El Azul)
- Río Silamapu • 43.49323°S 73.05711°W • 3870889 • STM
- Río Yeli • 43.51761°S 73.03343°W • 3867692 • STM
- Río Miragualai • 43.54263°S 73.02193°W • 3879717 • STM • (Mirahualai, Rio Maragualay, Rio Miragualai, Rio Miragualay, Río Maragualay, Río Miragualai, Río Miragualay)
- Río del Diablo • 43.56973°S 72.08533°W • 3969773 • STM
- Estero El Mancay • 43.58241°S 72.33096°W • 3969740 • STM
- Río Loro • 43.58756°S 72.75647°W • 3969674 • STM
- Estero El Blanco • 43.59354°S 72.32285°W • 3969741 • STM
- Río Palena • 43.60078°S 71.7857°W • 7116117 • STM (Aysén R.)

- Río Frío • 43.63508°S 72.323°W • 3969738 • STM

- Estero Campana • 43.62868°S 72.78747°W • 3969675 • STM
- Río del Trebol • 43.64215°S 72.68024°W • 3969672 • STM
- Río Tictoc • 43.64576°S 72.93474°W • 3869882 • STM
- Estero El Moro • 43.64936°S 71.91935°W • 3969834 • STM
- Arroyo López • 43.65948°S 71.69873°W • 3882512 • STM
- Río Oeste • 43.66254°S 72.32878°W • 3969744 • STM
- Arroyo Mallines • 43.66667°S 71.7°W • 3880829 • STM
- Estero Cordón Blanco • 43.68216°S 72.16957°W • 3969772 • STM
- Río del Torrente • 43.70282°S 72.10911°W • 3869511 • STM
- Río Tranquilo • 43.71115°S 72.16213°W • 3869308 • STM
- Río El Salto • 43.71616°S 71.819°W • 3969836 • STM • (Rio El Tigre, Río El Tigre) • (CL)
- Arroyo Las Matreras • 43.75229°S 71.81749°W • 3884196 • STM
- Arroyo EL Moro • 43.76171°S 71.82571°W • 3969837 • STM
- Río Silberia • 43.87556°S 71.75333°W • 3969843 • STM
- Río Frutilla • 43.94686°S 73.08071°W • 3950155 • STM

== See also ==
- List of lakes in Chile
- List of volcanoes in Chile
- List of islands of Chile
- List of fjords, channels, sounds and straits of Chile
- List of lighthouses in Chile
