= Carrán-Los Venados =

Volcanic group in southern Chile

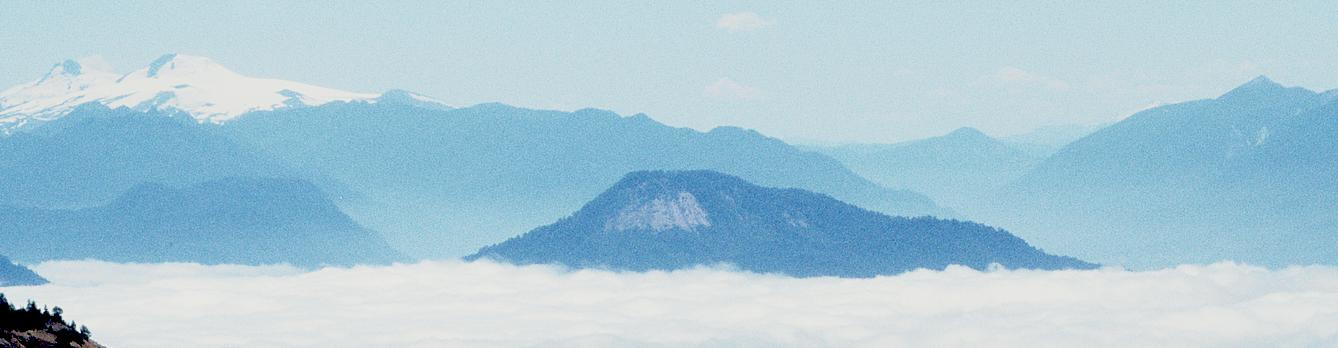
- Cerro Los Guindos (center) as seen from south; Mocho-Choshuenco volcano in left background

Highest point
- Elevation: 1,114 m (3,655 ft)
- Coordinates: 40.308°S 72.07°W (highest point)

Geography
- Location: Chile

Geology
- Mountain type(s): Pyroclastic cones, maars
- Volcanic zone: Southern Volcanic Zone
- Last eruption: April to May 1979

Carrán-Los Venados (Spanish pronunciation: [kaˈran los βeˈnaðos]) is a volcanic group of scoria cones, maars and small stratovolcanoes in southern Chile, southeast of Ranco Lake. The highest cone is Los Guindos (Spanish for "The Cherry Trees), which is a small stratovolcano with an elevation of 1,114 metres (3,655 ft). The volcanic group has recorded eruptions from 1955 and 1979. Located south of Maihue Lake and north Puyehue Volcano Carrán-Los Venados group is placed at the intersection of several faults on the thin crust (~30 km) of southern Chile, among them Liquiñe-Ofqui and Futrono Fault.

== Volcanoes ==
- Carrán - a waterfilled maar, erupted in 1955 (also called "Nilahue")
- Mirador - a cinder cone, erupted in 1979
- Pocura - a water filled maar, unknown date of eruption
- Riñinahue - a non-waterfilled maar, erupted in 1907
- Volcanes Los Venados - the western and southernmost group of volcanoes of Carrán-Los Venados group, unknown dates of eruption
- Los Guindos - the tallest of the group, an extinct small stratocone

== See also ==
- List of volcanoes in Chile
