= Chollinco Airport =

- IATA: none; ICAO: SCIF

Summary
- Airport type: Public
- Serves: Llifén, Chile
- Elevation AMSL: 330 ft / 101 m
- Coordinates: 40°12′19″S 72°13′55″W

Map
- Location of Chollinco Airport in Chile

Runways
Direction	Length		Surface
Direction	m	ft	Surface
10/28	583	1,913	Grass
- Source: Landings.com Google Maps GCM

Chollinco Airport Spanish: Aeropuerto de Chollinco, (ICAO: SCIF) is an airport serving Llifén, a lakeside village in the Los Ríos Region of Chile.

The airport is in the valley of the Calcurrupe River 3 kilometres (1.9 mi) east of the Ranco Lake shoreline. There is mountainous terrain north and south of the runway.

== See also ==
- Transport in Chile
- List of airports in Chile
