= Hueinahue River =

Coordinates: 40°18′56″S 72°56′53″W

Hueihahue River
- Native name: Río huenahue (Spanish)

Location
- Country: Chile

Physical characteristics
- Source
  - location: Continental divide
- Mouth
  - location: Maihue Lake
  - elevation: ~90 m (300 ft)

The Hueinahue River is a river in Futrono and Lago Ranco communes, southern Chile. It drains waters from the cordillera at the Argentine border west to Maihue Lake, which in turn flows by Calcurrupe River into Ranco Lake. The river flows in an east-west direction along the Futrono Fault.

== See also ==
- List of rivers of Chile
