= Calcuruppe Airport =

Airport in Chile

- IATA: none; ICAO: SCLF

Summary
- Airport type: Private
- Serves: Llifén, Chile
- Elevation AMSL: 335 ft / 102 m
- Coordinates: 40°14′35″S 72°14′54″W

Map
- Location of Calcuruppe Airport in Chile

Runways
Direction	Length		Surface
Direction	m	ft	Surface
12/30	600	1,969	Grass
- Source: Landings.com Google Maps GCM

Calcuruppe Airport Spanish: Aeropuerto Calcuruppe, (ICAO: SCLF) is a lakeside airport 5 kilometres (3.1 mi) south of Llifén, a village in the Los Ríos Region of Chile.

The airport is on the eastern shore of Ranco Lake. There is high terrain north through east of the runway.

== See also ==
- Transport in Chile
- List of airports in Chile
