= Death and state funeral of Sebastián Piñera =

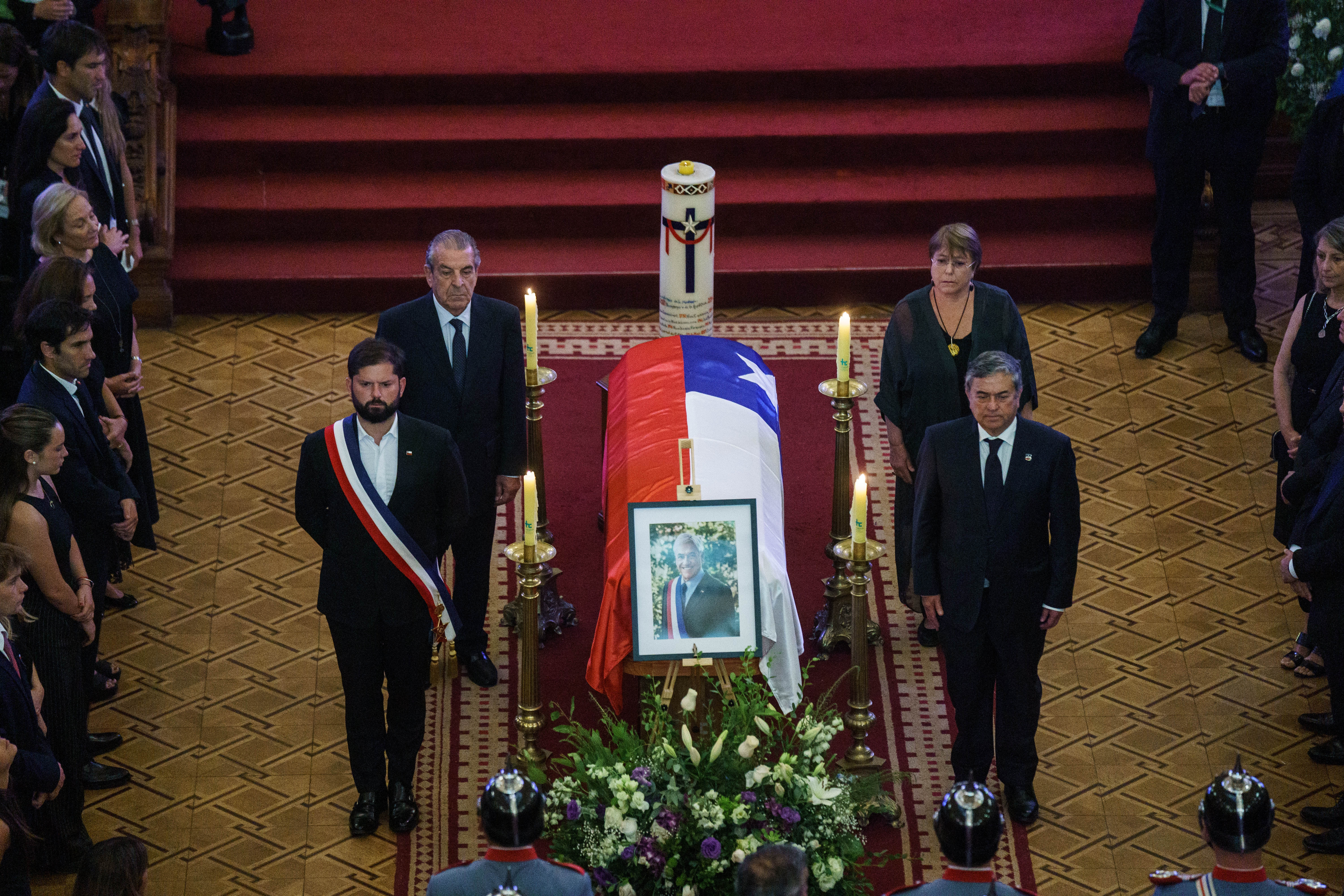
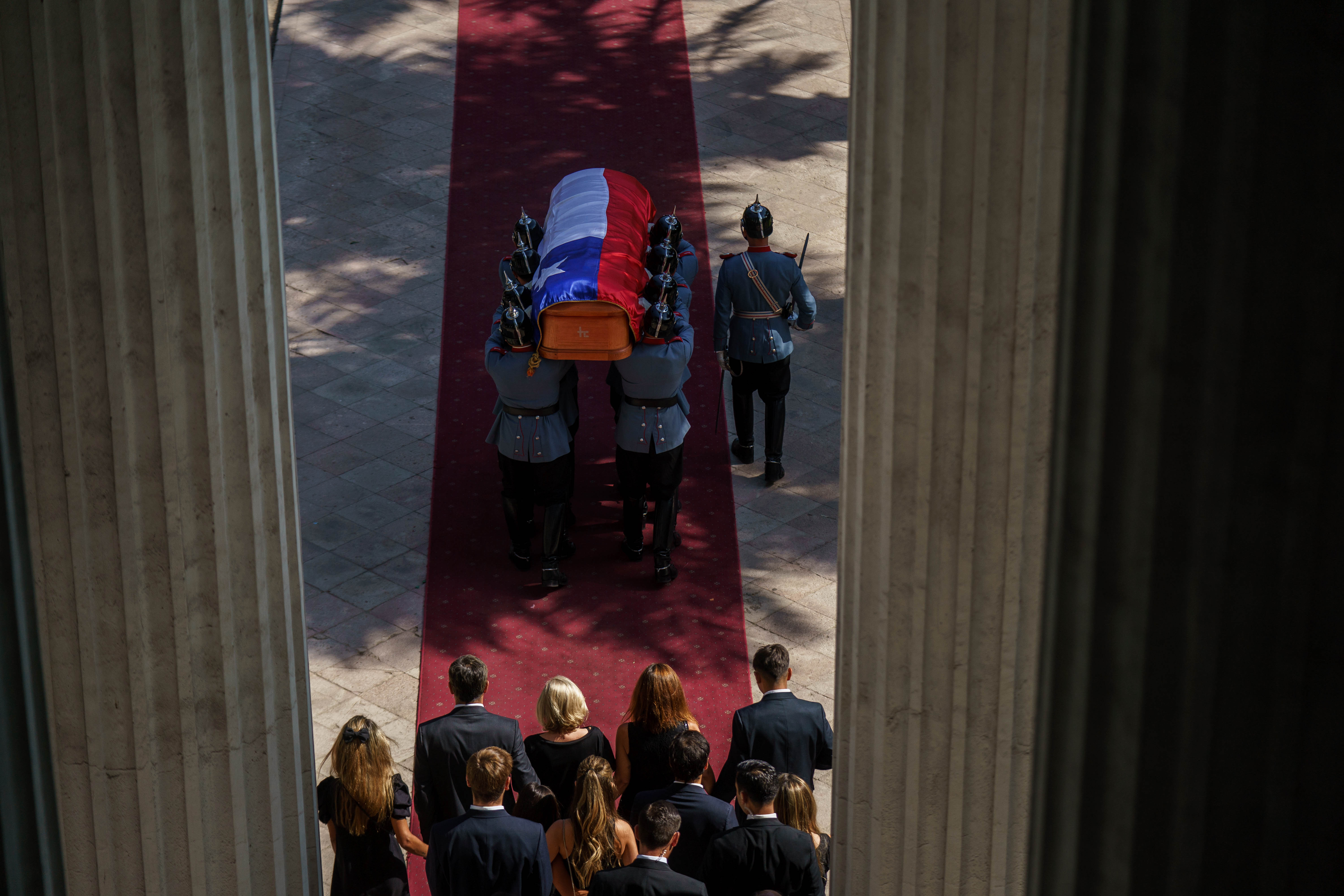
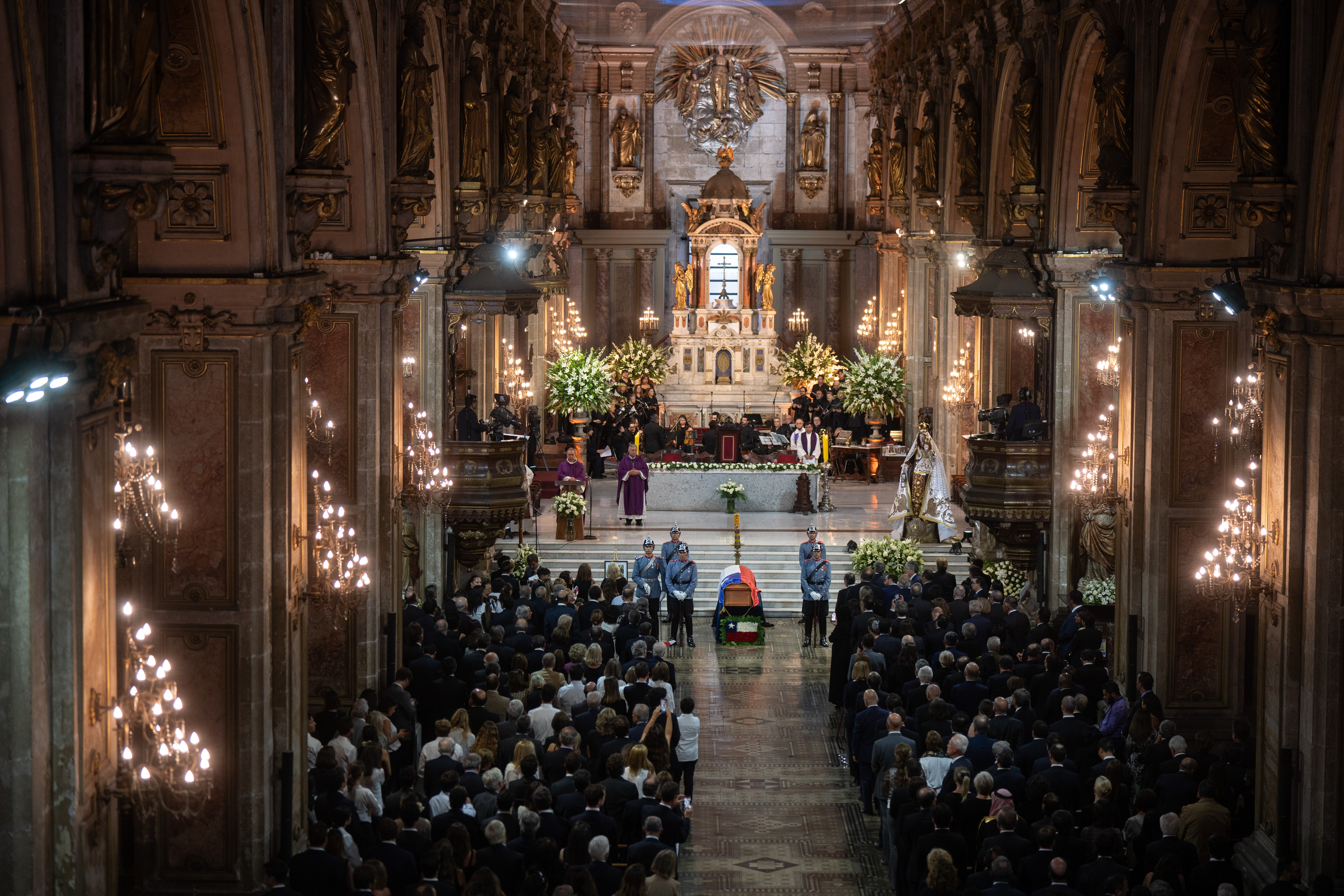
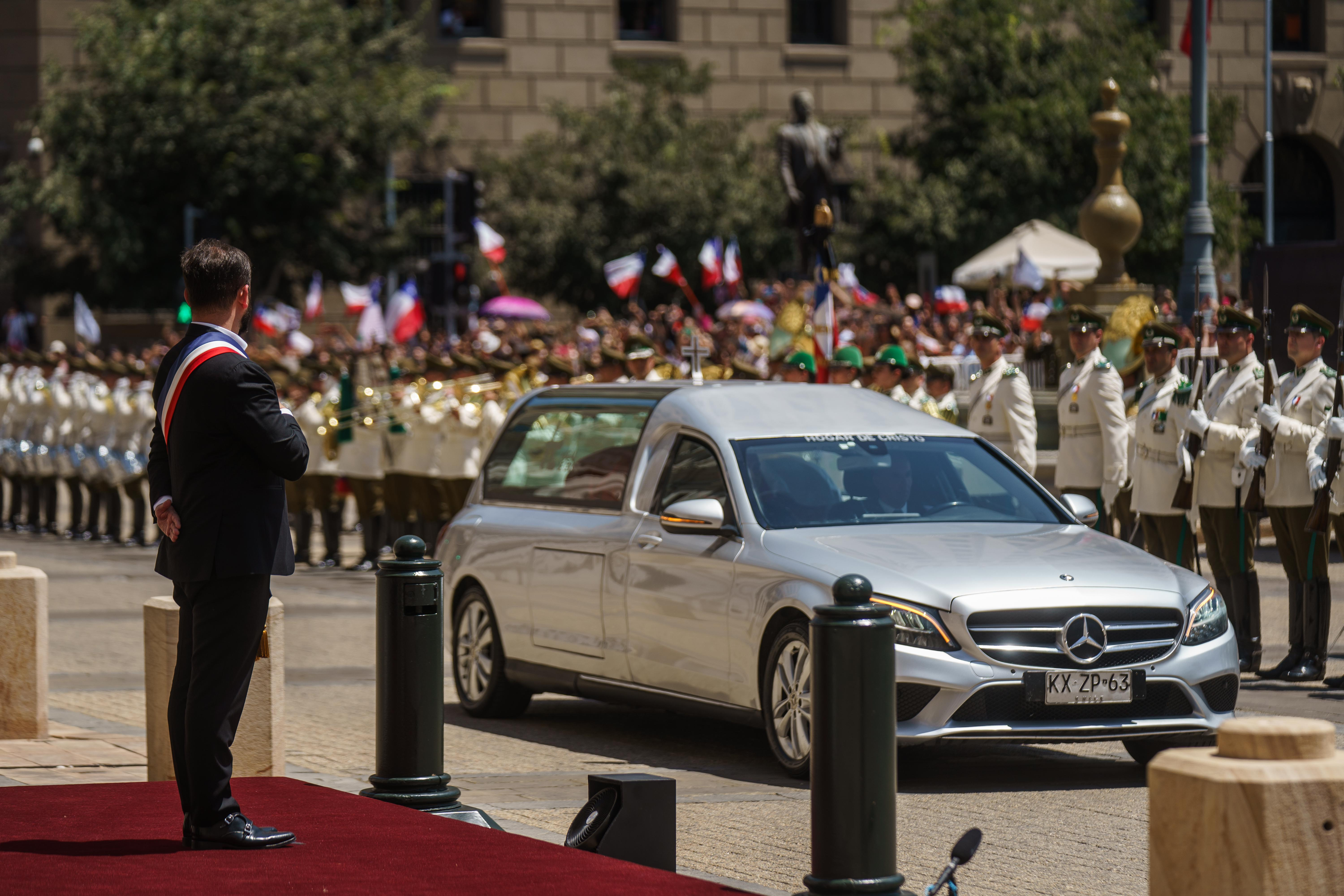
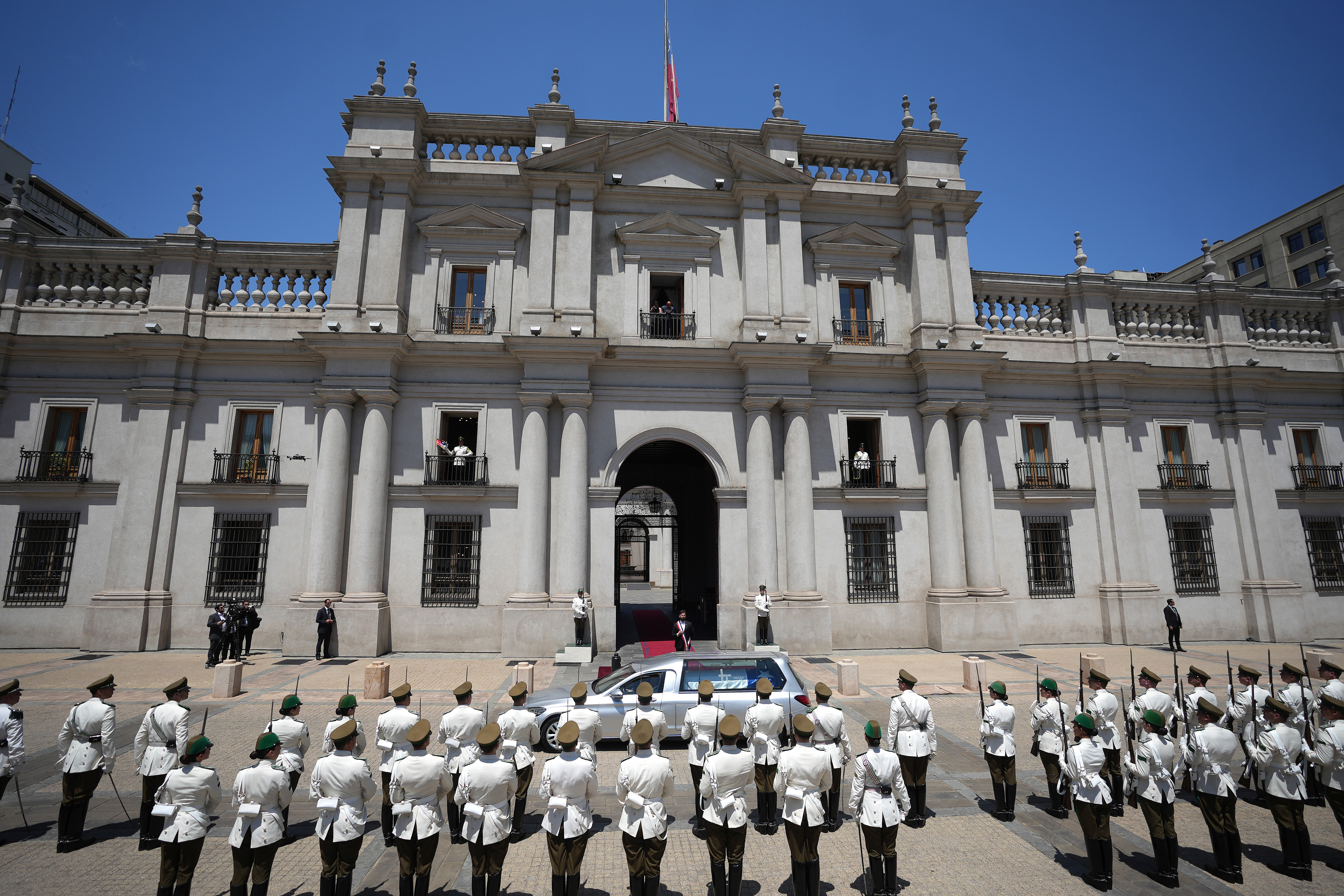
- Clockwise from top, top to bottom, left to right : 1. President Boric, former Presidents Ruiz-Tagle and Bachelet, and Senate President Coloma stands beside Piñera's coffin during the lying in state in Former National Congress of Chile building 2. Members of La Moneda Palace Guard carrying Piñera's coffin out of the building after lying in state to proceed to Santiago Metropolitan Cathedral; 3. Funeral mass for Piñera in Santiago Metropolitan Cathedral; 4. The scene at La Moneda, where Piñera was taken to the cathedral for the mass after service at the palace 5. President Boric gives his last respect to Piñera before headed to the cathedral for the mass
- Date: 6 February 2024 (date of death); 9 February 2024 (date of state funeral)
- Location: Lake Ranco, Los Ríos Region (death); Former National Congress of Chile building, Santiago (wake); Santiago Metropolitan Cathedral (funeral mass)
- Cause: Helicopter crash
- Organised by: Government of Chile (state funeral)

Sebastián Piñera, former President of Chile, died on 6 February 2024 in a helicopter accident while on vacation in the commune of Lago Ranco, located in the southern Chilean region of Los Ríos. The helicopter crashed about 40 metres (130 ft) from the southern shore of Lake Ranco at Ilihue, east of Lago Ranco. He was 74 years old.

Later that evening, President Gabriel Boric, in an address from La Moneda, announced three days of national mourning and declared that Piñera would receive a state funeral.

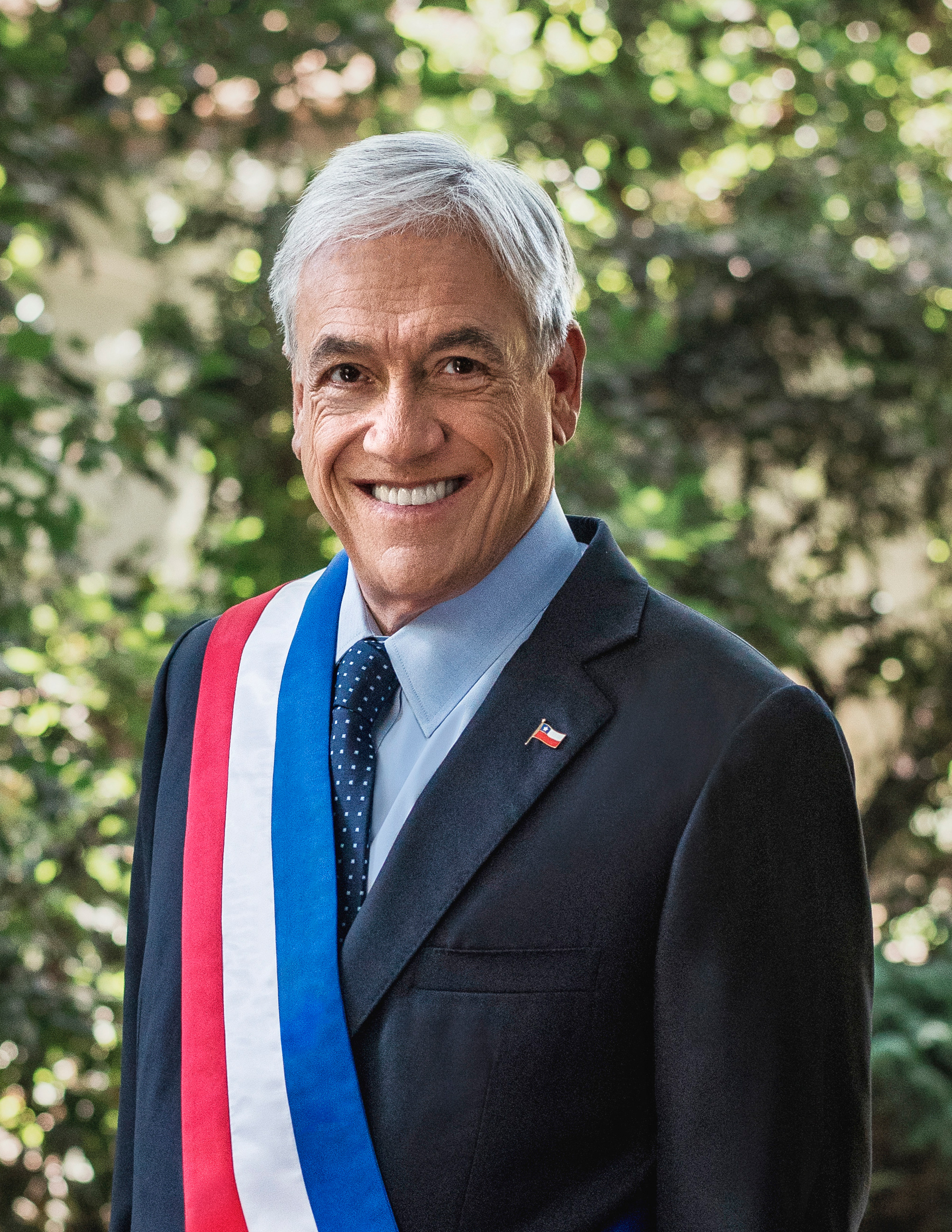
Former Chilean President Sebastián Piñera (1949–2024; pictured in 2018)

== Accident ==
Lake Ranco helicopter crash
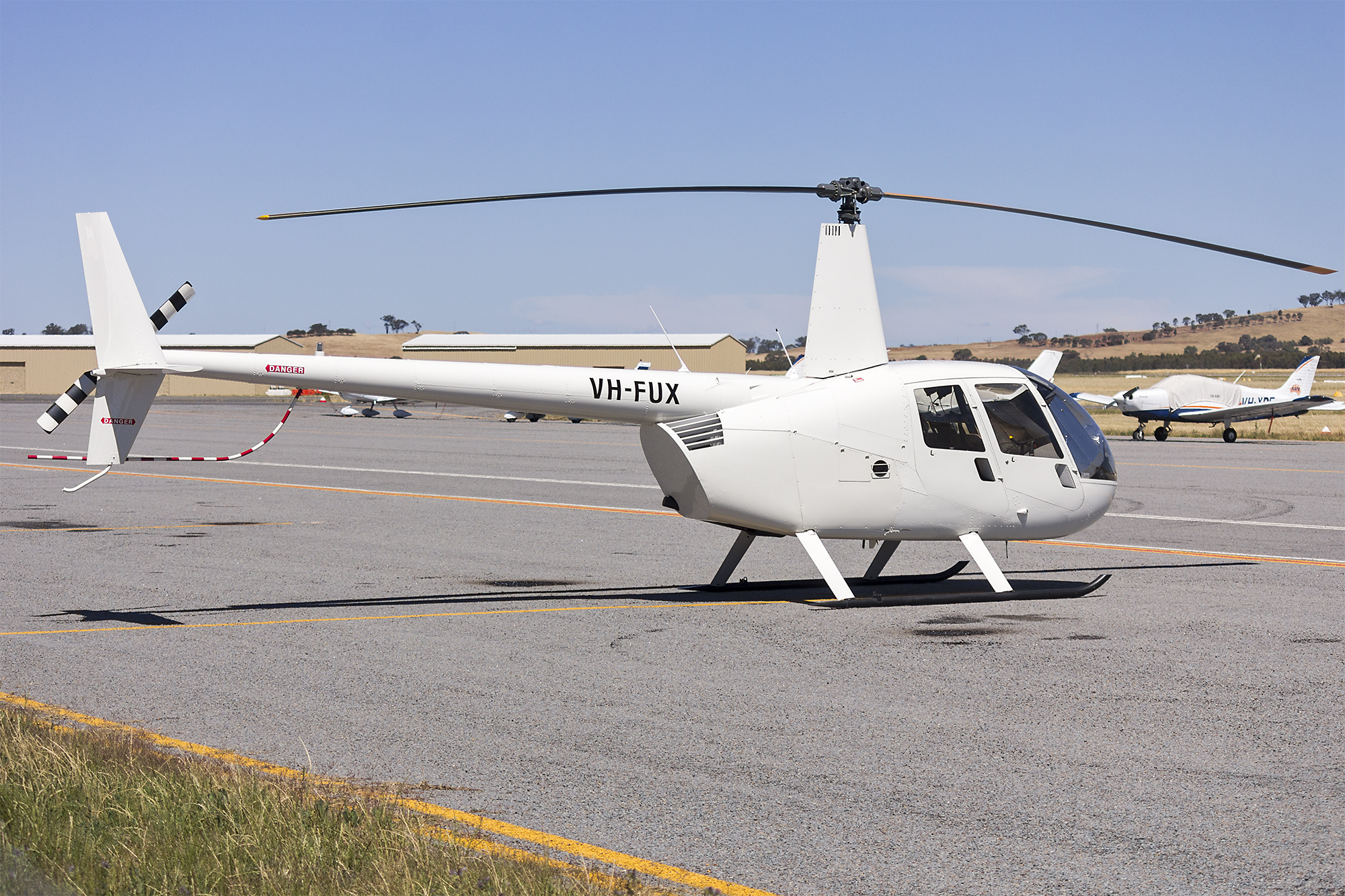
- A Robinson R44 Raven II, similar to the aircraft involved in the accident

Accident
- Date: 6 February 2024
- Summary: Spatial disorientation in low visibility, crash into lake
- Site: Lago Ranco, Chile

Aircraft
- Aircraft type: Robinson R44 Raven II
- Registration: CC-PHP
- Occupants: 4
- Passengers: 3
- Crew: 1 (Sebastián Piñera)
- Fatalities: 1 (Piñera)
- Injuries: 3
- Survivors: 3

Map of the Lake Ranco helicopter crash in which Sebastián Piñera died

Sebastián Piñera owned a residence in the Coique Bay area of the Futrono commune. On 6 February 2024, he attended a lunch with his sister Magdalena, businessman Ignacio Guerrero, and Ignacio's son Bautista at the home of businessman José Cox in the Ilihue sector of the Lago Ranco commune. Piñera piloted his Robinson R44 Raven II helicopter, with registration CC-PHP, across the lake from his residence. After lunch, as the return flight began, the helicopter lost control just a few meters from the shore, making contact with the surface of the water and capsizing into Lake Ranco in the Ilihue sector near the take-off site. The Carabineros de Chile received a report of the crash at 14:57 (UTC−03:00), with initial reports indicating one fatality and three survivors.

Close associates of the former president noted that the vehicle's visibility might have been compromised due to fogged windows. Less than 40 minutes passed between the alert call and Piñera's body being handed over to Carabineros. Former minister Karla Rubilar told the press that, according to his sister Magdalena, who was aboard the helicopter, his final words were: "You jump first, because if I jump with you, the helicopter will fall on all of us."

Piñera's body was recovered by the Chilean Navy from a depth of 28 m (92 ft). His death was confirmed around 17:00 through a statement from his press office and a statement from Minister of the Interior and Public Security, Carolina Tohá. The General Directorate of Civil Aeronautics confirmed that the other three occupants of the aircraft survived. At the time of the crash, there was a strong storm in the area. According to La Nación, Piñera survived the crash itself, but the impact left him unconscious and unable to remove his safety belt, resulting in his drowning. His three companions managed to swim to shore.

An investigation into the crash by the Directorate General of Civil Aviation concluded that the crash was caused by a loss of visual references in poor visibility, which led to spatial disorientation and an unintentional descent into Lake Ranco.

== State funeral ==
Arrival of Sebastián Piñera's coffin to Santiago and start of the state funeral

Institutional tribute to Sebastián Piñera at the Former National Congress of Chile building

After Piñera's death was confirmed, President Gabriel Boric announced a three-day national mourning period in a televised address shortly after 18:00. He also disclosed plans for a state funeral, with Foreign Minister Alberto van Klaveren designated to lead the organizing committee.

Funeral mass of Sebastián Piñera at the Metropolitan Cathedral

President Gabriel Boric and La Moneda Palace Guard pay tribute to former President Sebastián Piñera

The funeral proceedings began when a Chilean Air Force (FACh) plane carrying Piñera's remains, following an autopsy in Valdivia, landed at Arturo Merino Benítez International Airport in Santiago. President Gabriel Boric, accompanied by some ministers, received the remains and the family at the FACh Group 10 ramp. Subsequently, the Air Force rendered honors, and the procession proceeded to the former National Congress building, where Piñera's remains lay in state until the morning of 9 February. Afterward, the remains were transferred to the Santiago Metropolitan Cathedral for a funeral mass. Following the mass, the remains were taken to the Parque del Recuerdo Cemetery for a private burial at the Piñera family crypt, with a homage paid at La Moneda Palace by the palace guard and President Boric along the way.

=== Confirmed attendees ===
Confirmed Chilean attendees at the funeral included President Boric and his predecessors Eduardo Frei Ruiz-Tagle (served 1994–2000) and Michelle Bachelet (served 2006–2010 and 2014–2018). The president of the Supreme Court, Ricardo Blanco Herrera, president of the Senate, Juan Antonio Coloma Correa, and some of the miners rescued from the 2010 Copiapó mining accident were also present.

Foreign dignitaries included former president of Paraguay Mario Abdo Benítez and former president of Ecuador Guillermo Lasso, under-secretary of foreign affairs of Uruguay Nicolás Albertoni, Sergio Díaz-Granados Guida, president of the CAF – Development Bank of Latin America and the Caribbean, Secretary General for Communication of the Presidency of Ecuador, Roberto Izurieta Canova, Argentinian vice-minister of foreign affairs Leopoldo Francisco Sahores, and Peruvian foreign affairs secretary Elmer Schialer Salcedo.

== Reactions ==
=== Domestic ===
President Gabriel Boric praised Piñera as a "democrat from the very beginning." Boric's praise of Piñera was criticized by some of his political allies in the Communist Party of Chile. Boric also said that Piñera's death moved and mourned the country in already difficult circumstances due to the 2024 Chile wildfires. Furthermore, he declared that "with deep regret I want to express my condolences that I personally conveyed to his daughters, his family, all those close to him and those who were part of his two governments". Former president Michelle Bachelet expressed deep regret over Piñera's death and said she valued his "commitment to our country and democracy, as well as his tireless work and service to the nation". Minister of the Interior Carolina Tohá expressed shock at Piñera's death and conveyed her solidarity to his family and friends; she also described Piñera as "a democratic president".

Daniel Jadue, the mayor of Recoleta, expressed regret at Piñera's death despite their "deep differences", and sent condolences to his family, friends and party. Piñera's former labor minister Evelyn Matthei described him as "a great friend, a great leader. Passionate about Chile, passionate about life," and gave "the most sincere condolences to Cecilia and her entire family." Piñera's former education and social development minister Joaquín Lavín offered his prayers to Piñera's family.

Former conservative presidential candidate José Antonio Kast declared that Piñera "was a great public servant and gave the best years of his life to serving Chile".

Television host Mario Kreutzberger described Piñera as "always very friendly and willing to collaborate with us. His life and career were undoubtedly marked by his vocation for public service, which led him to the presidency of Chile twice." Television personality Martín Cárcamo also offered his condolences, stating "I interviewed him many times and, more than once, we were able to talk off camera. Always willing and open to a conversation, whether it was about big country topics or simple and beautiful conversations about life itself."

The Colo-Colo association football club, which was previously partially owned by Piñera, expressed condolences over his death. Pablo Milad, the president of the National Professional Football Association (ANFP) expressed his condolences, noting that Piñera would be remembered as "a person who was always interested in the development and modernization of Chilean football, in improving and renewing the infrastructure of our stadiums and promote a culture of sports practice and healthy living among Chileans." In addition, he confirmed that Piñera will be honored along with the victims of the forest fires in central Chile with a minute of silence prior to the 2024 Supercopa de Chile.

Following news of Piñera's death, Televisión Nacional de Chile modified its logo by adding the color black as an expression of mourning.

Jimmy Sánchez, one of the 33 miners rescued during the 2010 Copiapó mining accident, said that it was a pleasure to meet Piñera, and said that he was grateful that "he gave us our lives back."

=== International ===
- Argentina: President Javier Milei sent condolences to Piñera's family and the people of Chile. Former presidents Alberto Fernández, Cristina Fernández de Kirchner, and Mauricio Macri also expressed their condolences.
- Bolivia: President Luis Arce extended condolences to Piñera's family and the Chilean people. Condolences were also sent by former presidents Evo Morales, Carlos Mesa, Jorge Quiroga Ramírez, Eduardo Rodríguez Veltzé, and Jeanine Áñez.
- Brazil: President Lula da Silva expressed his grief over Piñera's death and sent his deepest condolences to his family and friends. Former presidents Michel Temer and Jair Bolsonaro also sent their condolences.
- Canada: Prime Minister Justin Trudeau declared himself shocked and saddened and also sent condolences to the Chilean people and Piñera's family.
- China: President Xi Jinping expressed his condolences to President Boric, describing Piñera as an "outstanding politician of Chile" who "devoted himself to the development of China-Chile relations and the mutually beneficial and friendly cooperation". Foreign Ministry spokesperson Wang Wenbin issued a statement lamenting Piñera's death, calling him a "good friend" of the Chinese people.
- Colombia: Former presidents Andrés Pastrana, Iván Duque, Juan Manuel Santos, and Álvaro Uribe Vélez sent their condolences to Piñera's family and the Chilean people.
- Costa Rica: The Government expressed deep sorrow to the people and Government of Chile for Piñera's death. Former presidents Laura Chinchilla and Carlos Alvarado Quesada also extended their condolences.
- Cuba: President Miguel Díaz-Canel expressed condolences to the family and friends of Piñera.
- Dominican Republic: President Luis Abinader issued a statement through the Ministry of Foreign Affairs extending his "sincere condolences to his family and loved ones. Peace to his soul."
- Ecuador: Former president Guillermo Lasso expressed his condolences to Piñera's family, especially to his wife Cecilia Morel and to the Chilean people. Former president Rafael Correa also joined in offering condolences and said that despite ideological differences, he always maintained a good relationship with Piñera. Former president Lenín Moreno also joined in offering condolences on Piñera's death.
- European Union: High Representative for Foreign Affairs Josep Borrell extended condolences to Piñera's family and friends as well as the people and government of Chile.
- France: President Emmanuel Macron remembered Piñera as "an untiring force for the growth and development of his country, an international leader committed to our cause for the Amazon, a friend of France."
- Guatemala: The Ministry of Foreign Affairs communicated its condolences to Piñera's family through X and expressed its solidarity with the government and people of Chile.
- Holy See: Pope Francis conveyed his condolences via Secretary of State Cardinal Pietro Parolin.
- Honduras: President Xiomara Castro expressed solidarity with the Chilean people over Piñera's death.
- Jamaica: Prime Minister Andrew Holness expressed his condolences on behalf of the Jamaican people to Piñera's family and the Chilean people.
- Japan: The Embassy of Japan in Chile issued a statement expressing condolences on Piñera's death.
- Mexico: Foreign Minister and former ambassador to Chile Alicia Bárcena lamented Piñera's death and extended condolences to his family, friends, and Chileans. Former President Felipe Calderón also sent condolences.
- Morocco: King Mohammed VI sent a message expressing to President Boric, to Piñera's family and to the Chilean people, "his deep condolences and sincere feelings of compassion following the death of a statesman who devoted his life to faithfully serving the higher interests of his country, as well as to consolidating its democratic institutions."
- Nicaragua: President Daniel Ortega and his wife and vice president Rosario Murillo also wrote in a letter addressed to President Boric that "we respectfully convey our condolences to you" for Piñera's death, and prayed for "his eternal rest."
- Oman: Sultan Haitham bin Tariq sent a message of condolence and consolation to President Boric.
- Panama: President Laurentino Cortizo expressed grief over Piñera's death and sent his condolences to his family and the people of Chile. Former presidents Martín Torrijos Espino and Juan Carlos Varela joined in offering condolences.
- Paraguay: President Santiago Peña lamented Piñera's death and expressed condolences. Former presidents Mario Abdo Benítez and Horacio Cartes also joined in offering condolences.
- Peru: The office of President Dina Boluarte issued a statement lamenting Piñera's death. Former presidents Ollanta Humala, Martín Vizcarra, Manuel Merino, and Francisco Sagasti also extended their condolences to the Chilean people.
- Russia: President Vladimir Putin, through a telegram, expressed grief at Piñera's death and highlighted "a significant contribution to the development of friendly Russian-Chilean relations."
- Saudi Arabia: King Salman bin Abdulaziz Al Saud and Crown Prince Mohammed bin Salman Al Saud sent a message of condolence and consolation to President Boric.
- Spain: King Felipe VI recalled Piñera's "firm commitment to the well-being of the beloved Chilean people and his willingness to strengthen the already close relations" with Spain. Prime Minister Pedro Sánchez expressed his dismay at Piñera's death and sent condolences to his family, friends, and the government and people of Chile. Former prime minister Mariano Rajoy also offered his condolences, describing Piñera as a politician who loved his country.
- Ukraine: President Volodymyr Zelenskyy expressed his "sincere condolences to the family and close ones of the deceased and to the Chilean people."
- United Kingdom: Former prime minister and incumbent foreign secretary David Cameron declared he was "deeply saddened" by the death of Piñera, whom he described as a true friend.
- United States: President Joe Biden sent his condolences.
- Uruguay: President Luis Lacalle Pou posted his condolences via X to Chileans and their families. Former presidents José Mujica and Julio María Sanguinetti also expressed their condolences.
- Venezuela: President Nicolás Maduro expressed solidarity with the Chilean people and lamented Piñera's death. Opposition leader María Corina Machado also lamented Piñera's death. Former national assembly president Juan Guaidó mourned his death and described him as "a friend and sincere ally in the rescue of democracy in Venezuela."
