= Puerto Nuevo =

Puerto Nuevo may refer to:

== Places ==
Argentina

- Puerto Nuevo, Argentina

Chile

- Puerto Nuevo, Chile

Mexico

- Puerto Nuevo, Baja California

US

- Puerto Nuevo (Hato Rey), Puerto Rico

== Other uses ==
- Club Atlético Puerto Nuevo, an Argentinian football club
- Puerto nuevo (film), a 1936 Argentine musical film
