= Pillanleufú River =

Lake District, Chile

Coordinates: 39.99°S 72.15°W

- Native name: Río Pillanleufú (Spanish)

Location
- Country: Chile

Physical characteristics
- Source
  - location: Mocho-Choshuenco
- Mouth
  - location: Maihue Lake

Pillanleufú River (Mapudungun for river of the pillán) is a river in Futrono, southern Chile. It drains waters from the southern and eastern slopes of Mocho-Choshuenco volcano to Maihue Lake, which in turn flows by Calcurrupe River into Ranco Lake. The river flows in a north-south direction along the Liquiñe-Ofqui Fault.

== See also ==
- List of rivers of Chile
