= Futrono Fault =

Futrono Fault is a NWW tending geological fault in Los Ríos Region, running from the northern shore of Ranco Lake through the areas immediately south of Maihue Lake.

The fault has a northwest-striking basement fault system composed of several prominent lineaments in the granitic basement of southern Chile. The fault forms part of the structural framework of the Carrán-Los Venados volcanic field and, together with the Liquiñe–Ofqui Fault Zone and subordinate trending fractures, is interpreted as exerting significant control on the distribution of volcanic vents and magma ascent.
