= Llifén =

Coordinates: 40.1978°S 72.2598°W

- Town
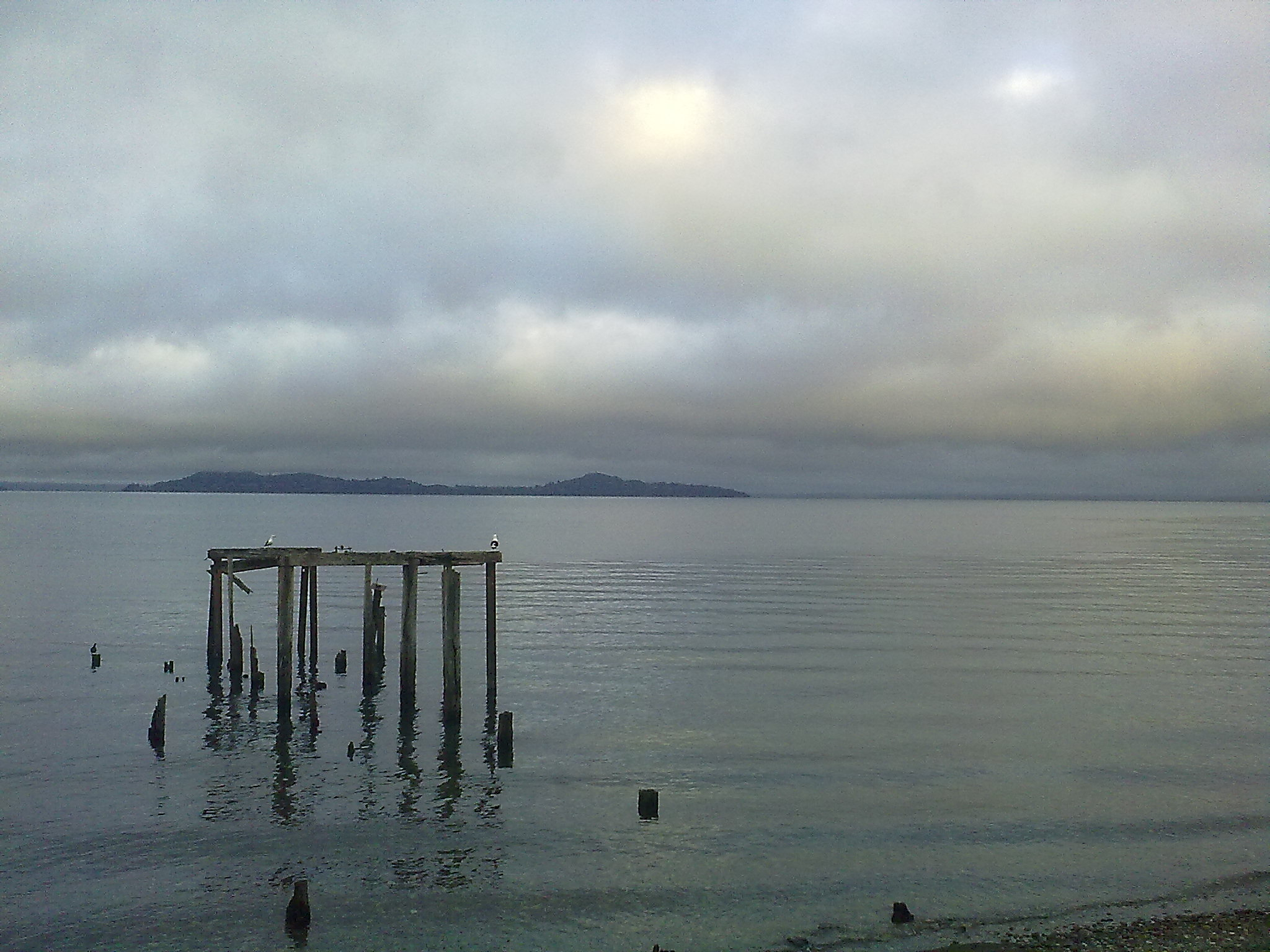
- Interactive map of Llifén
- Country: Chile
- Region: Los Ríos
- Province: Ranco
- Municipalidad: Futrono
- Comuna: Futrono

Government
  - Type: Municipalidad
  - Alcade: Jorge Tatter Oñate (2008-2012)

Population (2017 census)
  - Total: 768
- Time zone: UTC−04:00 (Chilean Standard)
  - Summer (DST): UTC−03:00 (Chilean Daylight)
- Area code: Country + town = 56 + ?

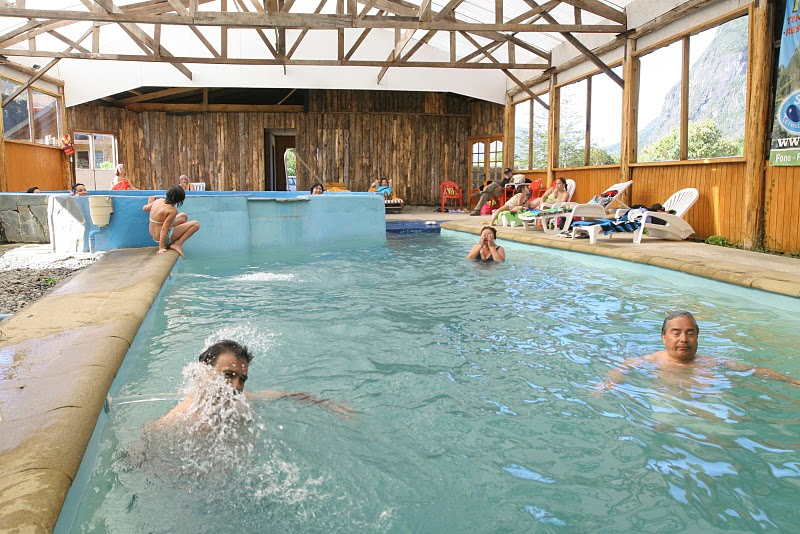
Hot springs in Llifén

Llifén is a Chilean town (Spanish: pueblo) in the commune of Futrono on the shores of Ranco Lake located near the mouth of Calcurrupe River. In 2017 Llifén had a population 768, a slight increase relative to the 748 inhabitants recorded in the 2002 census. Llifén was one of the last places in Chile where artisan fishing was done with fish traps called lollys. Fishing with this technique ceased in the 1970s.

The town is served by Chollinco Airport.

== See also ==
- List of towns in Chile
