= Guapi Island =

Island in Ranco Lake, southern Chile

- Interactive map of Guapi Island

Geography
- Location: Ranco Lake
- Coordinates: 40°13′20″S 72°22′42″W
- Area: 8.13 km^{2} (3.14 sq mi)

Administration
- Chile
- Region: Los Ríos
- Province: Ranco
- Commune: Futrono

Demographics
- Population: 900
- Ethnic groups: Huilliche and Mapuche

Guapi or Huapi (Mapudungun for island) is an island in Ranco Lake, southern Chile. Administratively it belongs to the commune of Futrono in Los Ríos Region. It has an area of 813 hectares (8.13 km^{2}; 3.14 sq mi).
