= Puerto Nuevo, Chile =

Puerto Nuevo
- Interactive map of Puerto Nuevo
- Coordinates: 40°15′11″S 72°34′33″W
- Region: Los Ríos
- Province: Ranco
- Municipality: La Unión
- Commune: La Unión

Government
  - Type: Municipal
  - Alcade: andres reinoso(Ps)
- Elevation: 129 m (423 ft)

Population (2002 census )
  - Total: 438
- Time zone: UTC−04:00 (Chilean Standard)
  - Summer (DST): UTC−03:00 (Chilean Daylight)
- Area code: Country + town = 56 + 63

Puerto Nuevo is a lakeside village (Spanish: aldea) near the outflow of Ranco Lake in La Unión commune, southern Chile.
