= Contrafuerte River =

- Native name: Río Contrafuerte (Spanish)

Location
- Country: Chile

Physical characteristics
- Source
  - location: Puyehue-Cordón Caulle
- Mouth
  - location: Nilahue River
  - elevation: 297 m (974 ft)

Contrafuerte River is a river in the Los Ríos Region of Chile. The river flows north from the northern slopes of Puyehue-Cordón Caulle following Liquiñe-Ofqui Fault. It flows into Nilahue River.
