= Maihue Lake =

Lake in Chile

- Lago Maihue (Spanish)
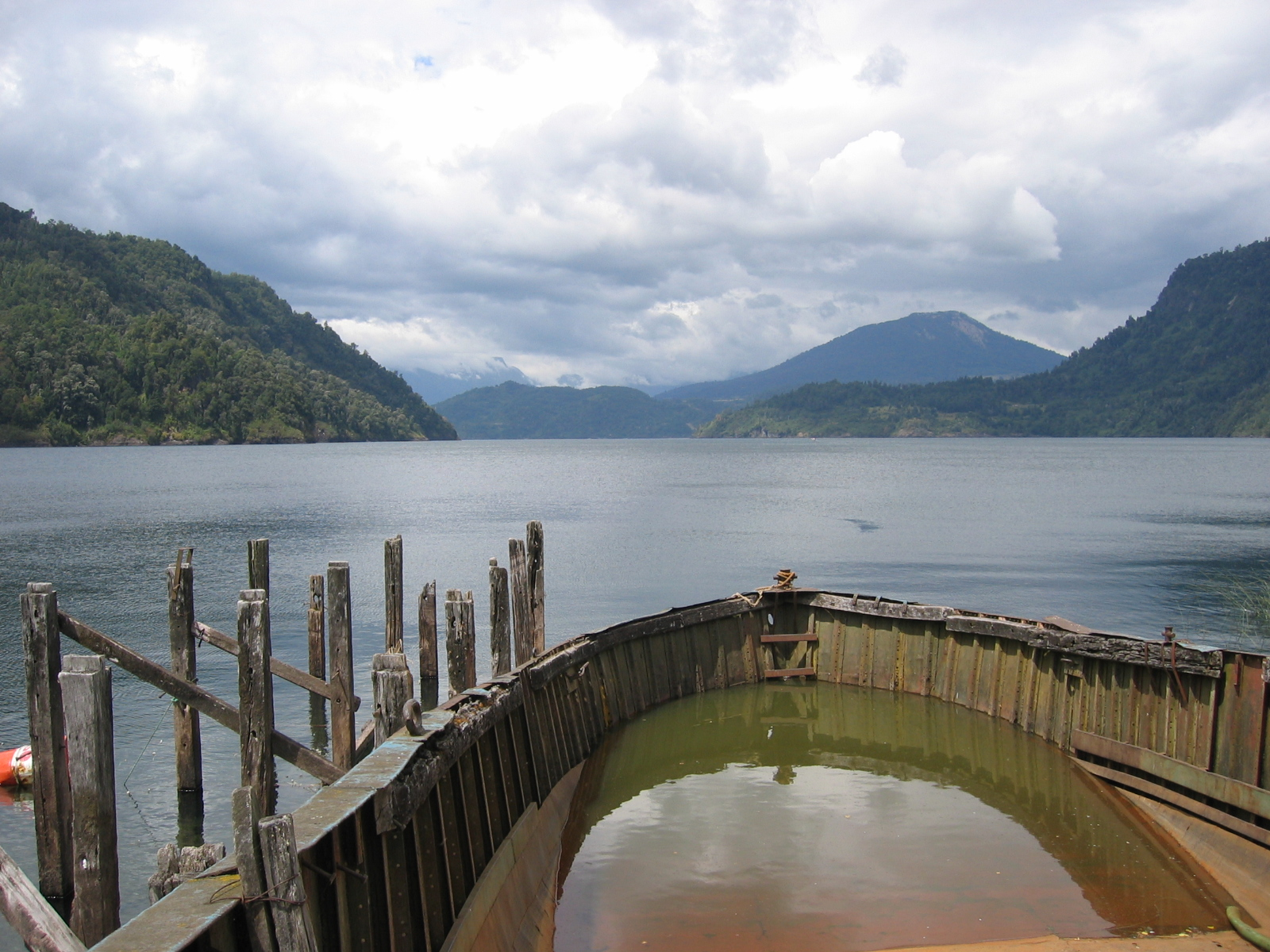

- Location within Chile
- Location: Ranco Province
- Coordinates: 40°17′S 72°03′W
- Primary inflows: Pillanleufú River, Hueinahue River
- Primary outflows: Calcurrupe River
- Catchment area: 15,124 km^{2} (5,839 sq mi)
- Basin countries: Chile
- Max. length: 16 km (9.9 mi)
- Max. width: 6 km (3.7 mi)
- Surface area: 47.2 km^{2} (18.2 sq mi)
- Average depth: ~ 121 m (397 ft)
- Max. depth: 207 m (679 ft)
- Water volume: 5.7 km^{3} (1.4 cu mi)
- Surface elevation: 90 m (300 ft)
- Settlements: Chabranco

The Maihue Lake (Spanish: Lago Maihue, Spanish pronunciation: [ˈmajwe], Mapudungun for Wooden glass) is a lake located east of Ranco Lake in the Andean mountains of southern Chile. The lake is of glacial origin and it is enclosed by mountain ranges of the Andes, by all sides, and drains west to Ranco Lake.
