= Ilihue =

- Location within Chile
- Coordinates: 40°18′51″S 72°23′32″W
- Country: Chile
- Region: Los Ríos
- Province: Ranco
- Commune: Lago Ranco

Government
  - Type: Municipal
- Elevation: 121 m (397 ft)

Population (2013)
  - Total: 650
- Time zone: UTC−04:00 (Chilean Standard)
  - Summer (DST): UTC−03:00 (Chilean Daylight)
- Area code: Country + town = 56 + 64

Ilihue is a village located in the commune of Lago Ranco in Los Ríos Region, southern Chile. According to the 2013 census, it had a population of approximately 650.

It is an area known for being a highly touristic place because it is located in front of Lago Ranco, being a popular place to host hotels, cabins and restaurants. Currently, it is divided into two sectors, which are Ilihue Alto and Ilihue Bajo.

In this village is the Ilihue Private School, as well as green areas and the Ilihue Bajo Golf Course. In Ilihue, there is also the Salto Los Mañíos, a trail that stands out for its nature and for the waterfall that flows into the Iculpe River.

== History ==
The village of Ilihue gained recognition in February 2024, where it was announced that it was the place where the helicopter of the politician, commercial engineer and former president of Chile, Sebastián Piñera, crashed in Lake Ranco due to a helicopter accident, while he was accompanied by three other people, resulting in Piñera himself killed and three injured. The event occurred on 6 February 2024 at 14:57 (UTC-3), being confirmed that same day around 17:00.
