= Caunahue River =

River in Chile

Coordinates: 40°10′47″S 72°15′40″W

Caunahue River is a river located in the Los Ríos Region of Chile.
