= Calcurrupe River =

Coordinates: 40°12′42″S 72°11′51″W

- Native name: Río Calcurrupe (Spanish)

Location
- Country: Chile

Physical characteristics
- Source
  - location: Maihue Lake
- Mouth
  - location: Ranco Lake
  - elevation: 70 m (230 ft)

Calcurrupe River (Spanish: Río Calcurrupe) is a river in Ranco Province, southern Chile. It drains Maihue Lake and flows westward into Ranco Lake of which it is the primary source. The depression through which the river flows corresponds to the Futrono Fault.
