= Lake Ranco =

Lake in Chile

Lake Ranco Lago Ranco
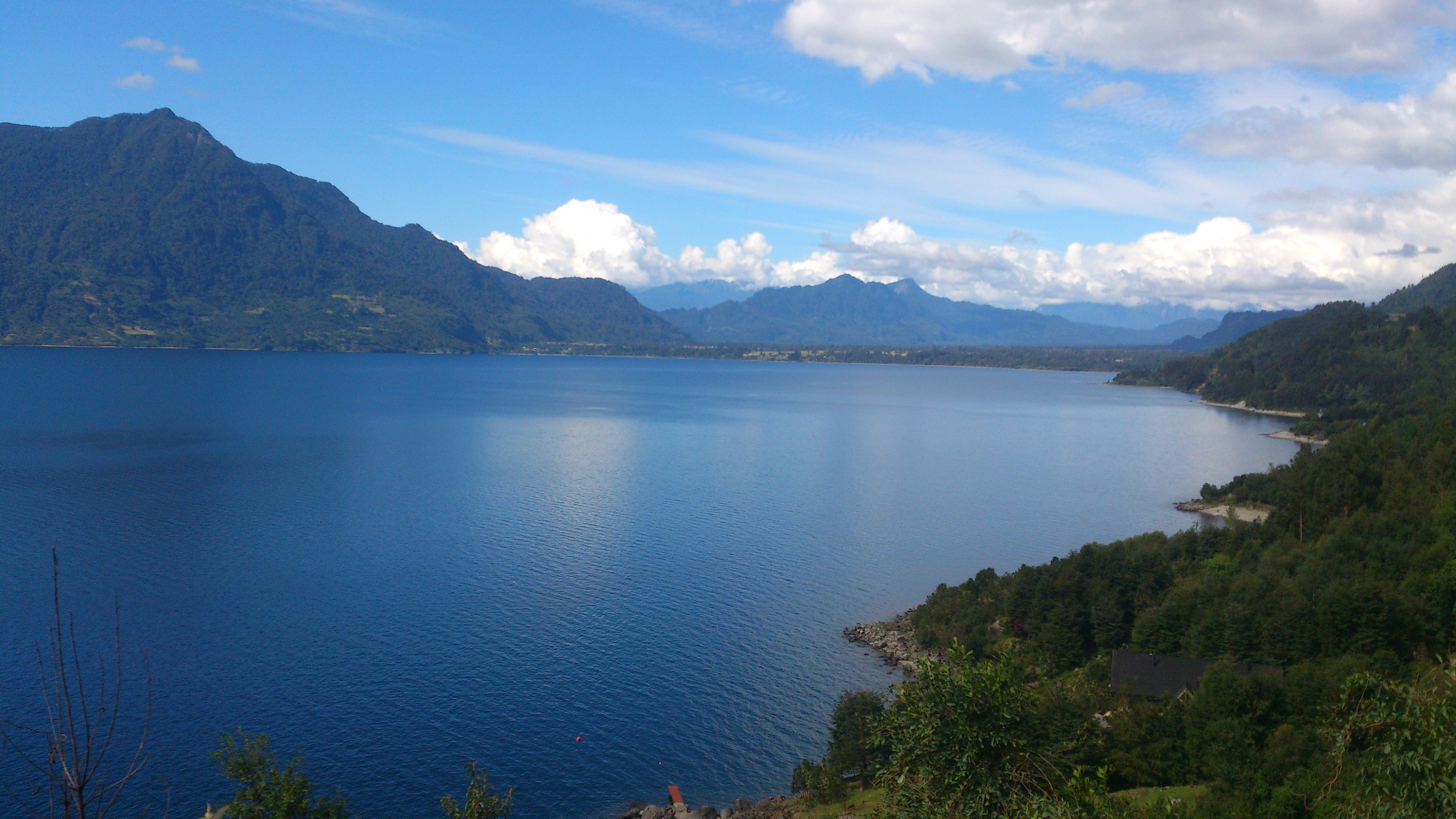
- View of the lakes southeastern embayment from Mirador Piedra Mesa

- Location within Chile
- Location: Ranco Province
- Coordinates: 40°14′51″S 72°23′07″W
- Primary inflows: Calcurrupe, Caunahue, Nilahue
- Primary outflows: Bueno River
- Catchment area: 3,997 km^{2} (1,543 sq mi)
- Basin countries: Chile
- Max. length: 26 km (16 mi)
- Max. width: 21 km (13 mi)
- Surface area: 442 km^{2} (171 sq mi)
- Average depth: 122 m (400 ft)
- Max. depth: 199 m (653 ft)
- Water volume: 53.92 km^{3} (12.94 cu mi)
- Shore length^{1}: 154.6 km (96.1 mi)
- Surface elevation: 64 m (210 ft)
- Islands: Huapi Island, Illeifa
- Settlements: Futrono, Lago Ranco, Llifén, Puerto Nuevo, Ilihue
- ^{1} Shore length is not a well-defined measure.

Lake Ranco (Spanish: Lago Ranco) is situated in the Ranco Province of Los Ríos Region in Chile. Covering an area of 442 km^{2}, it is the largest lake in the Los Ríos Region and the fourth largest in Chile. It has approximately 25 islands and islets, but only 4 are currently inhabited.

The lake is known for sport fishing and offers attractions like La Piedra Mesa and the Nilahue waterfall. Popular spots like Coique Beach attract both residents and visitors. The town of Lago Ranco, founded in 1941, is rich in native vegetation. Its name originates from the Mapudungun language, meaning "water with waves." Around 30 indigenous communities live along its shores.

== Geography ==
Lake Ranco topographic map

The lake hosts a series of islands, with Huapi Island being the largest. Illeifa Island is owned by the affluent Edwards family. The western half of the lake is roughly circular, while the eastern part features deep embayments. Geographically, the lake lies in the Andean precordillera, the zone between the Chilean Central Valley and the Andes.

The lake differs from other large lakes to the north and south by lacking a clearly visible large volcano in its surroundings.

Administratively, Lake Ranco is split into three communes: La Unión, Futrono, and Lago Ranco.

== Geology ==
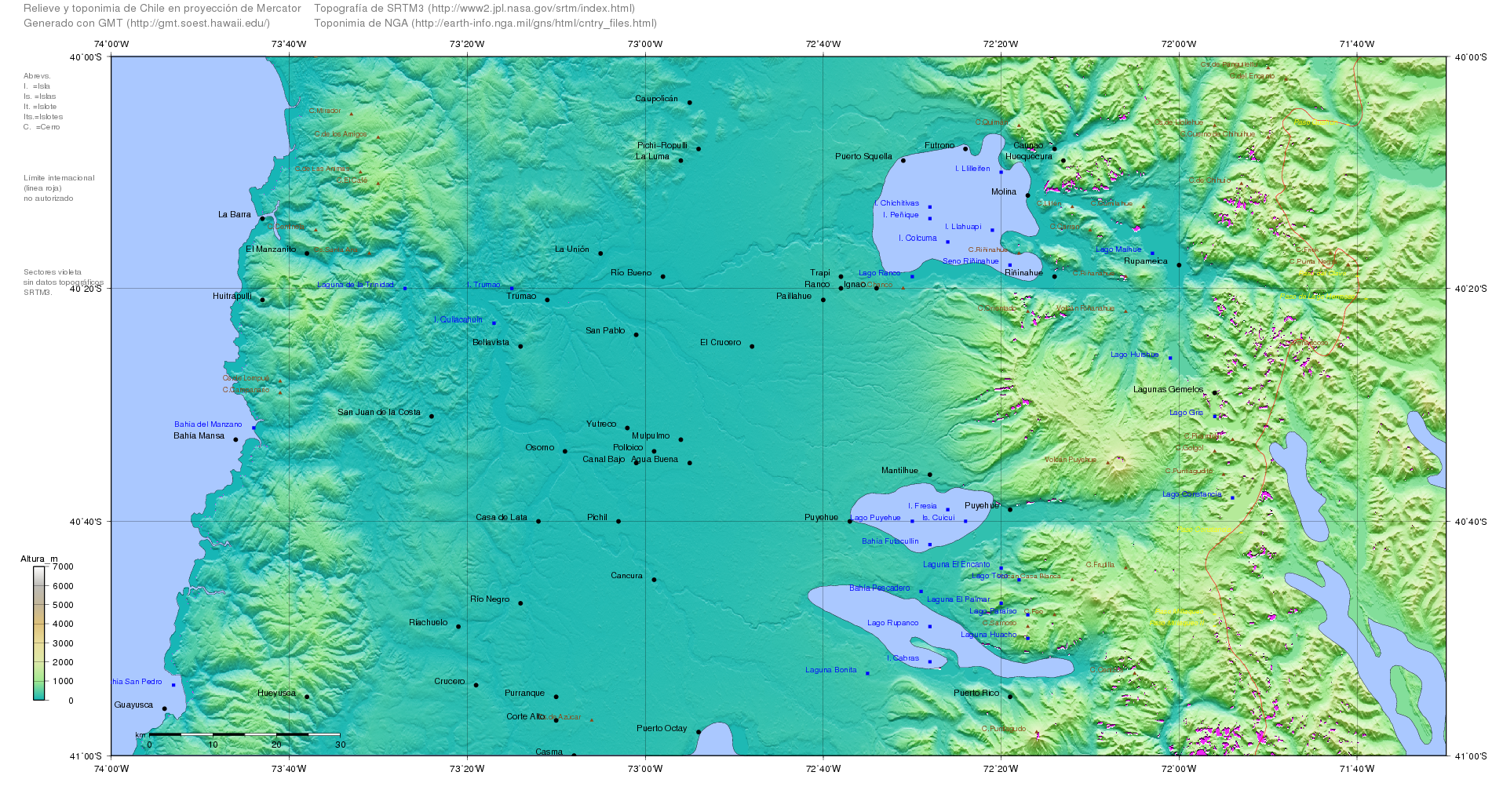
Topography of the region. The Puyehue-Cordón Caulle massif is located between Ranco and Puyehue Lake.

During the Miocene, the lake depression was connected to the Pacific Ocean as an embayment. During this period, a series of marine fossil-bearing sediments known as Estratos de Lago Ranco were deposited in the lake area. During the Quaternary glaciations, the lake depression was covered by a large glacier lobe of the Patagonian Ice Sheet, which left semicircular moraines around the lake's western shore.

== Ecology ==
The invasive plant species Limnobium laevigatum is present in the lake, which is some of its southernmost locales in Chile.

According to a 2018 report from the General Directorate of Waters, in 2009, the lake had an oligotrophic level with a high degree of human intervention.

== Economy ==
One of the main tourist attractions in the area is Lake Ranco's beaches, featuring two commercial hubs: an artisanal fair, a food center, and a water park open to both locals and visitors during the summer months. Lake Ranco, with its inviting shoreline, is becoming a tourist hotspot. The city provides various accommodation options such as lodging, cabins, and camping sites for tourists.

Many locals and outsiders, drawn by the area's beauty, proximity to major cities, reliable internet, and electricity, are starting businesses that can be managed remotely from Lago Ranco.

== Incidents ==
On 6 February 2024, former President of Chile Sebastián Piñera died after the helicopter he was piloting crashed into the lake during a storm.
