= British Chileans =

British Chileans Chileno-Británico Anglochileno
Total population
- At least 700,000

Regions with significant populations
- Antofagasta, Valparaíso, Concepción, Viña del Mar, Santiago, Punta Arenas

Languages
- Spanish. Minority speaks English, Welsh, Irish, Scottish Gaelic and/or Lowland Scots as a first language.

Religion
- Roman Catholicism, Protestantism (Anglicanism, Methodism, Presbyterianism et al.)

Related ethnic groups
- British people, English people, Scottish people, Irish people, Ulster-Scots people, Welsh people

British Chileans are Chilean residents with fully or partial antecedents from the United Kingdom. The British have been very important in the formation of the Chilean nation. They include Chileans of English, Scottish, Ulster Scots, (Northern) Irish and Welsh ancestry. The numbers of Scottish and Welsh are higher in Patagonia, in Aysén and Magallanes regions. The highest percentage of British Chileans is found in Punta Arenas, followed by Santiago, Valparaíso, Concepción, Viña del Mar and Antofagasta.

== History ==
The main British communities in Chile, or La Colonia Britanica, were located in Valparaíso, Punta Arenas, and Concepción. A key moment in British immigration to Chile occurred in 1811, when free trade was decreed, followed by laws in 1824 and 1845 encouraging immigration.

Facing the Pacific Ocean, Chile had for many years an important British presence. Over 50,000 British immigrants settled in Chile from 1840 to 1914. A significant number of them settled in Magallanes in Province, especially the city of Punta Arenas when it flourished as a major global seaport for ships crossing the Strait of Magellan from the Atlantic to the Pacific Ocean. Around 32,000 English settled in Valparaíso, influencing the port city to the extent of making it virtually a British colony during the last decades of the 19th century and the beginning of the 20th century. However, the opening of the Panama Canal in 1914 and the outbreak of the First World War drove many of them away from the city or back to Europe.

In Valparaíso they created their largest and most important colony, bringing with them neighbourhoods of British character, schools, social clubs, sports clubs, business organizations and periodicals. Even today their influence is apparent in specific areas, such as the banks and the navy, as well as in certain social activities, such as football (soccer), horse racing, and the custom of drinking tea.

During the war of independence (1818), it was mainly British privateers hired by the Chilean Government who contributed to the creation of the Chilean Navy, under the command of Lord Cochrane.

Investment from Britain contributed to Chile's prosperity, and British seamen helped the Chilean navy become a force in the South Pacific. Chile won two wars, the first against the Peru-Bolivian Confederation and the second, the War of the Pacific, in 1878-79, against an alliance between Peru and Bolivia. The liberal-socialist "Revolution of 1891" introduced political reforms modelled on British parliamentary practice and lawmaking.

British immigrants were also important in the northern zone of the country during the saltpetre boom, in the ports of Iquique and Pisagua. The King of Saltpetre, John Thomas North, was the principal tycoon of nitrate mining. Britain's legacy is reflected in the streets of the historic district of the city of Iquique, with the foundation of various institutions, such as the Club Hípico (Racing Club). Nevertheless, active British presence came to an end with the saltpetre crisis of the 1930s. The most important newspaper of the British community in Valparaíso during the 19th century was The Chilean Times. During the first half of the 20th century, the most influential medium was The South Pacific Mail (1909-1965), which circulated throughout the west coast of South America.

A contingent of British (principally Scottish and Irish) immigrants arrived between 1914 and 1950, settling in the present-day region of Magallanes. British families were established in other areas of the country, such as Santiago, Coquimbo, the Araucanía, and Chiloé.

== Cultural and technological legacy ==
The cultural legacy of the British in Chile is notable and has spread beyond the British Chilean community onto society at large. One custom taken from the British is afternoon tea, called "onces" by Chileans. Another legacy is the sheer amount of use of British first surname by Chileans.

British technology in mining, railway, maritime infrastructure, and other industrial applications predominated in Chile in the latter half of the 19th century, continuing through the 1930s. Manuel A. Fernández's book, "Technology and British Nitrate Enterprises in Chile, 1880-1914" (Issue 34 of Occasional Papers- Institute of Latin American Studies Glasgow University, ISSN 0305-8646) details some of the British technology contributions to the development of the Chilean mining industry. Similar benefits were seen in the railway and meat-processing industries. Many of the British engineers and technicians, who came to Chile to support British equipment, remained in the country. Even Chile's modern system of lighthouses was largely the result of British expertise and technology: towards the end of the 19th century, Scottish engineer George Slight designed and constructed 70 lighthouses, most of which are still in operation.

Chile currently has the largest population who can claim to be descendants of the British in Latin America. Over 1,000,000 Chileans may have British (English, Scottish and Welsh) or Irish origin, amounting to about 6.5% of Chile's population. Many speak unaccented English at home. There are many schools in Chile that are bilingual, offering a British curriculum in English and the standard Chilean curriculum in Spanish, and throughout the 20th century English language learning and teaching in state schools and private institutions with British curriculum is invariably geared towards the Received Pronunciation.

== Notable people ==
- Patricio Aylwin, President of Chile
- Ben Brereton Díaz, footballer
- William Beausire, stockbroker and disappeared prisoner during the military dictatorship
- Juan Pablo Bennett, Army General
- Alberto Blest Gana, writer and diplomat
- Claudio Bunster Weitzman, scientist
- Ricardo J. Caballero, Macroeconomist
- Ian Campbell, rugby union player
- Julio Canessa Roberts, Army General and politician
- Andrés Chadwick, politician
- Marta Colvin, sculptor
- Carlos Condell, Navy Rear Admiral
- Enrique Cood Ross, politician and diplomat
- Alejandra Chellew, businesswoman
- Carlos Condell, Navy Captain and hero of the War of the Pacific
- Francisco José Cox, Catholic Bishop
- William Cunningham Blest, doctor
- Adolfo Eastman, politician and former President of the Senate
- Agustín Edwards Eastman, businessman and owner of the El Mercurio newspaper
- Agustín Edwards Mac Clure, businessman, politician and diplomat
- Alejandro Foxley, academic and politician
- Laurence Golborne, Minister
- Marmaduke Grove, Air Force officer and politician, founder of the Socialist Party of Chile
- Juan Hamilton Depassier, politician
- Kevin Harbottle, footballer
- Luis Eduardo Hicks, Footballer
- Adolfo Holley, Army General
- Francisco Hudson, Navy officer and hydrographer
- Pablo Huneeus, writer
- Carlos Ibáñez del Campo, President (family Evans)
- Stewart Iglehart, rancher, ice hockey and polo player
- Gustavo Leigh, Air Force General and member of the Government Junta of 1973
- Bernardo Leighton, politician
- Arturo Longton, Actor and TV Personality
- Sergio Livingstone, football player and TV sports commentator
- Alastair MacGregor Martin, rugby union player
- Harold Mayne-Nicholls, journalist, FIFA official and former President of the National Professional Football Association and the Chilean Football Federation
- Ana Reeves, actress
- Agustín Ross, politician, diplomat and banker
- Carlos Ross, footballer
- Edmundo Searle, cartoonist
- Felipe Seymour, footballer
- Robert Souper Howard, Army officer
- María Elena Swett, actress
- Sussan Taunton Thomas, actress
- Raimundo Tupper, footballer
- Juan Williams Rebolledo, Chilean Navy Admiral
- Robert Winthrop Simpson, Navy officer
- Alexander Bryan Witt, filmmaker
- Andrés Wood, filmmaker
- Joan Jara, dancer, former wife (widow) to the Chilean poet and songwriter Victor Jara
- Benjamín Vicuña Mackenna, Chilean politician, writer, historian and naturalist

Also to note is that the Australian prime minister Chris Watson was born in Valparaíso of British/New Zealand and German-Chilean parentage. Isabel Allende's first husband, Michael Frias, is of significant British ancestry.

== See also ==
- English Chilean
- Scottish Chilean
- Welsh Chilean
- Irish Chilean
- Chile–United Kingdom relations
- Chileans in the Falkland Islands
- Chileans in the United Kingdom
