= Mundos Opuestos =

Mundos Opuestos or Mundos opuestos (English: "Opposite Worlds") may refer to:

- Mundos opuestos (Mexican TV series), a 1976 Mexican telenovela
- Mundos Opuestos (Chilean TV series), a 2012 Chilean reality television show
  - Mundos Opuestos (Colombian TV series), a 2012 Colombian version of the Chilean reality television show
- Mundos Opuestos (album), a 2005 album by American Latin pop duo Ha*Ash

== See also ==
- or
- Opposite Worlds, a 2014 U.S. version of the Chilean reality television show
