= Alfonso de Urresti =

Chilean politician

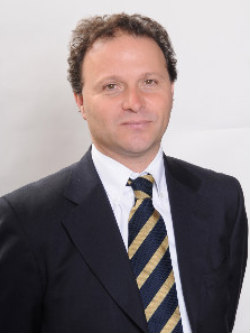

Member of the Senate
- Incumbent
- Assumed office 11 March 2014
- Preceded by: Eduardo Frei Ruíz-Tagle
- Constituency: 16th Circunscription (Los Ríos Region)

Member of the Chamber of Deputies
- In office 11 March 2006 – 11 March 2014
- Preceded by: Exequiel Silva
- Succeeded by: Iván Flores
- Constituency: 53rd District (Corral, Lanco, Máfil, Mariquina and Valdivia)

Personal details
- Born: 7 March 1966 (age 60) Viña del Mar, Chile
- Party: Socialist Party
- Parent(s): Alfonso Luis de Urresti; Lucy Berta Longton Guerrero
- Relatives: Arturo Longton (uncle); Arturo Longton Herrera (cousin); Andrés Longton (cousin)
- Education: University of Chile (BA)
- Occupation: Politician
- Profession: Lawyer

Alfonso Arturo de Urresti Longton (Viña del Mar, 7 March 1966) is a Chilean lawyer and politician affiliated with the Socialist Party of Chile (PS).

Since March 2022 he has served as a member of the Senate of Chile, representing the 12th Circunscription of the Los Ríos Region, for the 2022–2030 legislative period. He previously held the same position for the 16th Circunscription between 2014 and 2022, and was a member of the Chamber of Deputies for the former 53rd District from 2006 to 2014.

== Biography ==
De Urresti was born in Viña del Mar on 7 March 1966, the son of Alfonso Luis De Urresti Gorbeña and Lucy Berta Longton Guerrero. He is married to Carla Andrea Bizama del Pino, with whom he has two children. He is the nephew of former governor, mayor and deputy Arturo Longton Guerrero and cousin of current deputy Andrés Longton.

He completed his schooling at the Padre Alberto Hurtado and Concepción Schools in Chillán, and studied law at the University of Chile, where he graduated in 1994 with a thesis titled Opinions of the prosecutors of the Royal Audience of Chile in the 18th century. He was admitted to the bar on 25 July 1994. He later obtained master's degrees in public administration from the University of the Basque Country (2001) and in public law from the Autonomous University of Barcelona (2002).

In 1993 he moved to Valdivia, working for the Legal Aid Corporation of Chile and later as chief of staff to the regional governor of Los Lagos Region (1997–2000) and vice-president of the Port Authority of Puerto Montt (1999–2000). Between 2002 and 2005 he served as legal adviser to several municipalities and as a local police judge in Los Lagos. He also taught courses in political science and constitutional law at the Universidad San Sebastián and the Universidad Austral de Chile.

== Political career ==
De Urresti began his political activity as a student leader at the University of Chile and later joined the Socialist Party, becoming provincial president and a member of its Central Committee.

He was first elected to the Chamber of Deputies of Chile in the 2005 elections for the 53rd District (Corral, Lanco, Máfil, Mariquina and Valdivia) for the 2006–2010 term, becoming the first Socialist deputy for the area since the democratic transition. Re-elected in 2009, he served on the Standing Committees on Culture, Natural Resources and Fisheries, and chaired the Committee on Government, Regionalisation and Social Development.

He gained national visibility in 2011 after leading a parliamentary investigation into the HidroAysén hydroelectric project, which exposed procedural irregularities in its approval.

In the 2013 elections, De Urresti was elected to the Senate of Chile for the 16th Circunscription of Los Ríos Region, succeeding former president Eduardo Frei Ruiz-Tagle. In the upper house he has served on the Standing Committees on Constitution, Legislation, Justice and Rules; Public Works; and Environment, as well as on the Bicameral Group on Transparency and Probity. He was vice-president of the Senate between March 2019 and March 2020.

Re-elected in the 2021 elections under the “New Social Pact” coalition, he obtained 39 227 votes (26.4%) — the highest in the region — and continues to serve on the same legislative committees for the 2022–2030 period.
