= Luis Palacios Rossini =

Chilean minister (1910–1970s)

Minister of Mining
- In office 26 September 1963 – 3 November 1964
- President: Jorge Alessandri
- Preceded by: Joaquín Prieto Concha
- Succeeded by: Eduardo Simián

Personal details
- Born: 8 October 1910 Santiago, Chile
- Died: 1 January 1970 (aged 59) Santiago, Chile
- Party: None
- Spouse: Elsa Albornoz
- Children: Three
- Parent(s): Luis Antonio Palacios; Elena Rossini
- Education: Liceo de Aplicación
- Alma mater: University of Chile (LL.B)
- Occupation: Politician
- Profession: Lawyer

Luis Palacios Rossini (8 October 1910−the 1970s) was a Chilean politician who served as minister of State during Jorge Alessandri's government (1958−1964).

== Biography ==
Palacios studied at the Concepción Seminary, in the Biobío Region. Then, he moved to Santiago and joined the Líceo de Aplicación. Years later he obtained his BA in Laws.

Palacios worked in saltpeter offices in northern Chile. Then, in 1924, he joined the Caja Nacional de Ahorros. In that entity, Palacios started as an agent, then he was an inspector and ended up occupying the branch management both in the Caja and its successor, the Banco del Estado (since 1955), an institution created by the second government Carlos Ibáñez del Campo in 1953.

In September 1963, Palacios Rossini was appointed as Minister of Mining by the president Jorge Alessandri. He remained in office until the end of the government in November 1964.

== Bibliography ==
- Ramón, Armando de; Acevedo Fagalde, Ema; Valdivieso Fernández, Patricio (2003). Biografías de chilenos : miembros de los poderes ejecutivo, legislativo y judicial; 1876-1973 (in Spanish). Vol. 3 Letras L - Q. Santiago de Chile: Ed. Univ. Católica de Chile. ISBN 956-14-0725-6. OCLC 252715897.
