= Andrés Longton =

Chilean politician (born 1982)

- Official portrait, 2026

Member of the Senate
- Incumbent
- Assumed office 11 March 2026
- Preceded by: Ricardo Lagos Weber
- Constituency: 6th Circumscription

Member of the Chamber of Deputies
- In office 11 March 2018 – 11 March 2026
- Preceded by: Creation of the District
- Succeeded by: Javier Olivares
- Constituency: 6th District

Personal details
- Born: 26 May 1982 (age 44) Viña del Mar, Chile
- Party: National Renewal
- Parent(s): Arturo Longton; Amelia Herrera
- Relatives: Arturo (brother); Alfonso de Urresti (cousin)
- Education: Adolfo Ibanez University (LL.B); Pontifical Catholic University of Valparaíso (M.D.)
- Occupation: Politician
- Profession: Lawyer

Andrés Javier Longton Herrera (born 26 May 1982) is a Chilean lawyer, former reality TV contestant, and politician affiliated with the National Renewal party. He has served as a member of the Chamber of Deputies for District 6 of the Valparaíso Region since 2018 and was re-elected in 2021.

He first gained public recognition through his participation in the reality show Mundos Opuestos (lit. Opposite Worlds) in 2012, where he appeared alongside his brother Arturo Longton, achieving brief but intense media popularity.

Later, he leveraged that visibility into a formal career in public service, returning to his legal profession and specializing in criminal law. One of his early political roles was as a legislative advisor for the Ministry of the Interior and Public Security during Sebastián Piñera's second administration.

Longton has stood out in Congress for his strong support for public order. He has championed reforms related to security, anti-drug efforts, and the strengthening of the Chilean national police (Carabineros), establishing himself as one of the most visible voices among the younger generation of Chile’s center-right.

== Biography ==
Andrés Longton was born in Viña del Mar on 26 May 1982, the son of politician Arturo Longton Guerrero—former mayor of Quilpué and former member of Congress—and lawyer and regional governor Amelia Herrera Silva. He grew up in a family with a deep-rooted political tradition within Chile’s right-wing spectrum, which would later influence his public vocation.

He studied law at Andrés Bello National University, earning his law degree and practicing mainly in the field of criminal law. He worked in both the private sector and in public roles, most notably during Sebastián Piñera’s second term as part of the Ministry of the Interior, focusing on criminal legislation and citizen security policy.

Despite his legal background, he rose to public prominence in 2012 as a contestant on the reality TV show Mundos Opuestos, broadcast by Canal 13. This exposure made him a recognizable figure to the general public, a visibility he would later redirect into his political career.

== Political career ==
Longton officially entered politics as a member of National Renewal (RN), a party with which his family has long been associated. In 2017, he was elected to the Chamber of Deputies for the newly created District 6, which includes communes such as Quilpué, Villa Alemana, San Felipe, and Los Andes. In Congress, he has served on commissions focused on security, criminal law, and public order.

In 2016, Longton served as an official of the Chilean Chamber of Deputies, serving as an assistant attorney for the Permanent Committees.

During his first legislative term (2018–2022), Longton promoted various bills aimed at combating drug trafficking, protecting the police, and strengthening the criminal justice system. He has been openly critical of sectors that, in his view, justify or downplay violence, particularly in the aftermath of the 2019 Chilean social unrest.

He was re-elected in 2021 general elections with a high vote count.
