= Francisco Huaiquipán =

Chilean footballer (born 1978)

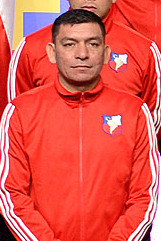
- Huaiquipán in 2015

Personal information
- Full name: Francisco Anderson Huaiquipán Castillo
- Date of birth: 10 October 1978 (age 48)
- Place of birth: Santiago, Chile
- Height: 1.65 m (5 ft 5 in)
- Position: Midfielder

Senior career*
Years	Team	Apps	(Gls)
1996–2003	Magallanes	78	(35)
2000	→ Provincial Osorno (loan)	30	(8)
2002	→ Colo-Colo (loan)	41	(8)
2004	Colo-Colo	8	(2)
2004	Atlante	0	(0)
2004	→ Potros Neza (loan)	8	(0)
2005	Everton	13	(0)
2005	Unión San Felipe	19	(3)
2006	Rangers	13	(1)
2007–2008	Santiago Morning	56	(13)
2009	Deportes Antofagasta	30	(6)
2010	San Marcos	6	(1)
2010	Santiago Morning	6	(0)
2011	Persik Kediri	0	(0)
2018	Artsul	–	(–)
2023–2024	Llano Unido	–	(–)
Total		308	(77)

Managerial career
- 2016: Independiente Cauquenes (assistant)
- * Club domestic league appearances and goals

Francisco Anderson Huaiquipán Castillo (born 10 October 1978) is a former Chilean footballer who played as a midfielder.

== Football career ==
In 1996, he debuted for Magallanes aged 18. After six seasons played there and a loan spell at Provincial Osorno, he joined ―on loan too― to Chilean powerhouse Colo-Colo in 2002. There, he helped the team to win the Torneo Clausura in June. However, in January 2003, he can't renovate his loan with the team, so that he returned Magallanes having to play in the Primera B de Chile (second-tier) all its 2003 season.

On 11 May 2002, it occurred one of his most important events when he scored a twice in the 3–0 home win over rivals Universidad de Chile at Estadio Monumental David Arellano. Likewise, still is regarded his performance where he show his skills in a friendly match against Leeds United at Melbourne that Colo-Colo lost 1–0 with score of Harry Kewell. According Mario Cáceres ―then Colo-Colo footballer― Huaiquipán impressed to the Englishmen.

On 16 February 2003, he was linked to Colón de Santa Fe, nevertheless, he failed to join to the Sabaleros. Then, after not renewing with Colo-Colo, the team announced that they will re–contract him in 2004.

In July 2004, he moved to Mexico after a failed incorporation to South Korean football. After unsuccessful seasons (2004–2006), he joined to Primera B team Santiago Morning in 2007, where being a key player, reached the promotion alongside the club.

In 2009, he left Santiago Morning and returned to second-tier, signing for Deportes Antofagasta. On 30 June, he was sent-off during the derby against San Marcos de Arica, team managed by Hernán Godoy, his former coach in Unión San Felipe. After his departure from Antofagasta, it was rumored about his arrival to then Municipal Iquique, freshly relegated team from the Primera División de Chile.

On 7 January 2010, he joined San Marcos de Arica aged 31, reuniting with Godoy, his former coach. His spell at Arica-based side was brief because Godoy marginated him from the team on 16 March due to discipline problems. Time later, he returned to Santiago Morning in July to play the 2010 Primera Division de Chile championship.

=== Late career ===
In 2011, after an unsuccessful contract with Indonesian club Persik Kediri, Huaiquipán finally retired from football aged 32.

Since his retirement from football, he participated at reality shows as well as in prime time programs of different Chilean television channels. Noteworthy, Huaiquipán has been object of several controversial moments.

He returned to the football activity in 2018 joining Brazilian club Artsul in the Campeonato Carioca.

In January 2024, Huaiquipán won the Liga de los Barrios de Melipilla with Club Llano Unido.

In September 2026, Huaiquipán joined Club Deportivo Pingüinos from Los Vilos.

== Coaching career ==
Huaiquipán has owned an eponymous football academy. In September 2016, he joined the technical staff of Nelson Tapia in Independiente de Cauquenes as the assistant coach.

== Media career ==
In February 2013, he appeared in Viña del Mar International Song Festival gala.

=== Mundos Opuestos ===
On 6 January 2012, it was confirmed that Huaiquipán reached an agreement with Canal 13 to participate in then new reality show, Mundos Opuestos, alongside other nine famous people from Chilean television. On 15 January, shortly after winning the inicial competence to pass to the future, he was named by his partners as captain of the «Eternity team». As time passed, Huaiquipán established a close camaraderie with his team, specially with Mario Moreno, Marcelo Marrochino and Tony Kamo. Nevertheless, he had also strong confrontations with Juan Lacassie (nicknamed «Chispa»), a professional skateboarder from a wealthy family based in Las Condes, middle–high/high–class commune of Santiago. On 27 January, they nearly fought to blows after «Chispa» strongly insulted him with classists epithets.

During February 2012's second week, Huaiquipán tried to escape several times from the reality's confinement located in Pirque, because he missed his family. Finally, on 20 February, it was revealed that he resigned to the reality. On 22 February, after winning his last competence, he officially left Mundos Opuestos. The next day, he declared in an interview that: "If return I will make to win." Days later, there were rumours in the press that he would re-join to the reality, receiving thrice more than his old salary.

== Personal life ==
Huaiquipán is of Mapuche descent and his surname comes from waiki pagi what means "spear (for) puma" in Mapudungun.

Huaiquipán was a candidate to councillor for La Granja commune in 2017.

=== Legal issues ===
In September 2021, Huaiquipán was arrested trying to enter drugs into the Colina Penitentiary Compliance Center. After being formalized for the crime of drug trafficking, the Colina Guarantee Court ordered to leave him in preventive detention.

In November 2026, he was arrested as part of a criminal investigation into alleged offenses of sexual abuse and rape against three minors. Following his arraignment, he was placed in pre-trial detention.

== Honours ==
Colo-Colo

- Primera División de Chile: 2002 Clausura

Llano Unido

- Liga de los Barrios Melipilla: 2024
