= Francisco Bartolucci =

Chilean politician

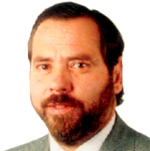
- Bartolucci in 1990

Member of the Chamber of Deputies
- In office 11 March 1990 – 11 March 2002
- Preceded by: District created
- Succeeded by: Laura Soto
- Constituency: 13th District

Mayor of Valparaíso
- In office 11 July 1978 – 1 September 1987
- Appointed by: Augusto Pinochet
- Preceded by: Hernán Sepúlveda Gore
- Succeeded by: Arturo Longton

National Secretary of the Youth
- In office 11 July 1978 – 1 September 1987
- President: Augusto Pinochet
- Preceded by: Jorge Fernández Parra
- Succeeded by: Humberto Prieto Concha

Personal details
- Born: 24 December 1949 (age 76) Valparaíso, Chile
- Party: National Party (1967–1973); Unión Demócrata Independiente (1988–)
- Education: Pontifical Catholic University of Valparaíso (LL.B)
- Occupation: Politician
- Profession: Lawyer

Francisco Bartolucci Johnston (born 24 December 1949) is a Chilean politician and scholar who was served as deputy. He taught at the Pontifical Catholic University of Valparaíso Law School.

== Early life and family ==
Bartolucci was born in Santiago on 24 December 1949. He is the son of Josefina Jhonston Miranda and Mario Bartolucci Matera.

In 1977, he married María Paulina Schiappacase, and they have five children.

== Professional career ==
He completed his primary and secondary education at Colegio San Pedro Nolasco, graduating in 1965. In 1968, he entered the Faculty of Law at the Pontifical Catholic University of Valparaíso, where he obtained a degree in Legal and Social Sciences. He was admitted to the bar before the Supreme Court of Chile on 22 April 1974.

After qualifying as a lawyer, he pursued an academic career, serving as assistant professor of Roman Law at the Faculty of Law of the Pontifical Catholic University of Valparaíso and later at the University of the Sea.

== Political career ==
During his university years, he became involved in politics as one of the founders of the University Gremialist Movement. He was later elected vice president of the Law Students’ Association and delegate to the university’s plenary cloister. He also served as academic senator between 1972 and 1973.

He served as Secretary of Youth for Valparaíso from 1974 to 1975 and as National Secretary of Youth between 1976 and 1978.

In 1978, he was appointed mayor of Valparaíso, serving until 1 September 1987.

On 22 October 1988, he signed the founding charter of the Independent Democratic Union (UDI) and became part of its provisional leadership. He later served as national vice president and regional president for Valparaíso.

Among other roles, he served as president of the board of the Municipal Corporation of Valparaíso for Social Development and as president of the Corporation for Art, Culture and Tourism of the city in 1986.

In the December 1989 parliamentary elections, he was elected deputy for District No. 13 (Valparaíso, Juan Fernández and Easter Island) for the 1990–1994 term, representing the Democracy and Progress coalition. He was re-elected in 1993 (1994–1998 term) and again in 1997 (1998–2002 term). In 2001, he was defeated in his re-election bid for the 2002–2006 term and was succeeded in the district by Carmen Ibáñez.

He has also served as a member of the board of the V Region Electric Distribution Company.

In the 2017 parliamentary elections, he ran as a candidate for the 6th Circumscription of the Valparaíso Region representing the Independent Democratic Union for the 2018–2022 term, but was not elected.
