= Benjamín Teplizky =

Chilean politician (1932–1997)

Minister of Mining
- In office 11 March 1994 – 3 August 1997
- President: Eduardo Frei Ruíz-Tagle
- Preceded by: Alejandro Hales
- Succeeded by: Sergio Jiménez Moraga

Superintendent of Social Security of Chile
- In office 11 March 1990 – April 1990
- President: Patricio Aylwin
- Preceded by: Renato de la Cerda
- Succeeded by: Luis Antonio Orlandini

Personal details
- Born: Benjamín Teplizky Lijavetzky; 12 December 1932 Santiago, Chile
- Died: 3 August 1997 (aged 64) Santiago, Chile
- Party: Radical Party (1955−1994); Radical Social Democratic Party (1994−1997)
- Spouse: Yunia Baraona
- Children: 3
- Education: University of Chile (LL.B)
- Occupation: Lawyer

Benjamín Teplizky Lijavetzky (12 September 1932 − 3 August 1997) was a Chilean politician who served as minister.

== Early life ==
He attended the Instituto Nacional General José Miguel Carrera and the Liceo Valentín Letelier in Santiago before earning a law degree from the University of Chile. He later pursued postgraduate studies in Salamanca and Madrid, Spain.

During the government of Salvador Allende, he served as president of the Federated Party of the Popular Unity, a political party that supported Allende's administration.

From 1961 to 1973, he taught at the School of Accountancy of the Faculty of Economics and Business, University of Chile, and from 1988 onward he taught in the law and journalism schools of the Universidad La República.

He worked for the state-owned Production Development Corporation (CORFO) for 16 years, was a founding member of the board of the Industria Nacional del Cemento (INACESA) from 1970 to 1973, and served on the board of Televisión Nacional de Chile (TVN) between 1970 and 1971.

== Political career ==
=== Opposition to Pinochet ===
During the military dictatorship of Augusto Pinochet, he was imprisoned for two years as a political prisoner at the Dawson Island concentration camp, the Buin Regiment, where he had previously completed his military service, and the detention camps at Ritoque and Tres Álamos.

In January 1975, he was expelled from Chile and spent two years in exile in Israel, followed by eleven years in Italy and Spain. While in Italy, he worked as a consultant for the Ente Nazionale Idrocarburi (ENI) in Rome between March 1977 and August 1978. He returned to Chile in August 1987.

=== Concertación ===
Between March and April 1990, he served as Superintendent of Social Security, and from 1991 to 1993 headed the Social Assistance Division of the Instituto de Normalización Previsional (INP).

He was a member of the board of directors of the Metro de Santiago from 1992 to 1994 and served as a regional councillor for the Santiago Metropolitan Region beginning in April 1993.

He was appointed Minister of Mining on 11 March 1994. By virtue of that office, he also served as chairman of the boards of Codelco, the National Mining Company (ENAMI), the National Petroleum Company (ENAP), and the governing council of Cochilco.

In August 1995, he received the National Mining Award, and in November of the same year, in Caracas, Venezuela, he was elected president of the Summit of Mining Ministers of the Americas.

He died while in office after suffering a fatal myocardial infarction at his home.

He was buried at the Jewish Cemetery of Recoleta.

His last official engagement was at the La Disputada de Las Condes mine, where he had inaugurated Chile's Mining Month celebrations.

A Freemason and member of the Fifth Company of the Ñuñoa Fire Department, "Bomba Israel", Teplizky had been married to Yunia Barahona since 1960 and had three children: Daniel, Roberto, and Cecilia.
