= Nelson Ávila (politician) =

Chilean politician

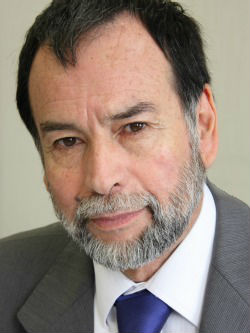
- Ávila in 2009

Member of the Senate
- In office 11 March 2002 – 11 March 2010
- Preceded by: Juan Hamilton Depassier
- Succeeded by: Ricardo Lagos Weber
- Constituency: 5th Circumscription

Member of the Chamber of Deputies
- In office 11 March 1994 – 11 March 2002
- Preceded by: Sergio Jara
- Succeeded by: Marcelo Forni
- Constituency: 11th District

Personal details
- Born: 29 September 1942 (age 83) Los Andes, Chile
- Party: Social Democrat Party (1967–1972); Radical Party (1972–1994) (2018–present); Party for Democracy (1994–2002); Radical Social Democratic Party (2005–2018)
- Spouse: Margarita Silva
- Children: Two
- Parent(s): Pedro Ávila; María Contreras
- Education: University of Chile
- Occupation: Politician
- Profession: Public administrator

Nelson Jaime Ávila Contreras (born 29 November 1942) is a Chilean politician who served as Senator and Deputy for his country.

He served as a Deputy for the Valparaíso Region between 1994 and 2002, and as a Senator for the Valparaíso Coast constituency between 2002 and 2010. Over the course of his career, he was affiliated with the Party for Democracy and later the Radical Social Democratic Party (PRSD).

== Early life and education ==
Ávila was born in Los Andes on 29 November 1942. He is the son of Pedro Nolasco Ávila Ávila and María Olivia Contreras Chinchón. He is married to Margarita Silva Marfán, daughter of former minister and senator Enrique Silva Cimma, and has two children.

He completed his primary education at Colegio Las Carmelitas in the commune of Santa María, San Felipe Province. His secondary studies were carried out at the Liceo de Hombres de San Felipe, the Instituto Abdón Cifuentes, and the Internado Nacional Barros Arana (INBA). He pursued higher education at the University of Chile, where he graduated in 1967 with a degree in Public Administration from the School of Political and Administrative Sciences.

During his university years, Ávila was actively involved in public and political life. Between 1965 and 1966, he served as vice president of the Youth Organization for the United Nations and as vice president of the Union of Chilean University Federations (UFUCH).

== Professional career ==
After graduating, Ávila worked in various positions related to public administration. Between 1968 and 1970, he served as head of personnel at the National Telecommunications Company of Chile (Entel Chile).

Following the 1973 coup d'état, he left Chile and traveled to Spain, where he undertook postgraduate studies in Public Administration. He later went into exile in Venezuela, where he obtained permanent residency. Between 1978 and 1987, he worked as an executive in insurance companies. Upon returning to Chile, he engaged in professional activities linked to international companies.

In 1990, Ávila assumed the position of Director of the Administration and Finance Division at the Ministry General Secretariat of Government.

== Political career ==
In 1970, Ávila was appointed Intendant of Aconcagua Province, a position he held until 1972. That year, he ran unsuccessfully for the Chamber of Deputies. He later served as national vice president of the Confederation of Private Employees of Chile until 11 September 1973.

In 1990, he joined the Party for Democracy (PPD) and became a member of its Central Committee. In the 1993 parliamentary elections, he was elected Deputy for District No. 11 of the Valparaíso Region for the 1994–1998 term, obtaining the highest vote share in the district. He was re-elected in 1997, achieving a doubling result in the constituency for the 1998–2002 term.

In the 2001 parliamentary elections, Ávila was elected Senator for the Valparaíso Coast constituency (Sixth Senatorial District), serving from 2002 to 2010. On 7 March 2003, he resigned from the PPD and formed his own political coalition, Chile V. In March 2005, he joined the Radical Social Democratic Party (PRSD), becoming a member of its Central Committee.

In August 2004, he was invited by the National Electoral Council of Venezuela to serve as an international observer during the Venezuelan presidential recall referendum.

On 21 September 2005, the Supreme Court lifted his parliamentary immunity following a complaint for slander and defamation. The case concluded with an agreement between the parties, and on 20 June 2006 he was definitively acquitted.

In the 2009 parliamentary elections, Ávila ran unsuccessfully for re-election to the Senate, stepping aside from his original constituency to allow the candidacy of Ricardo Lagos Weber. He was defeated by Christian Democratic candidate Ignacio Walker Prieto.
