= Ministry of Mining (Chile) =

Government ministry of Chile

- Ministerio de Minería
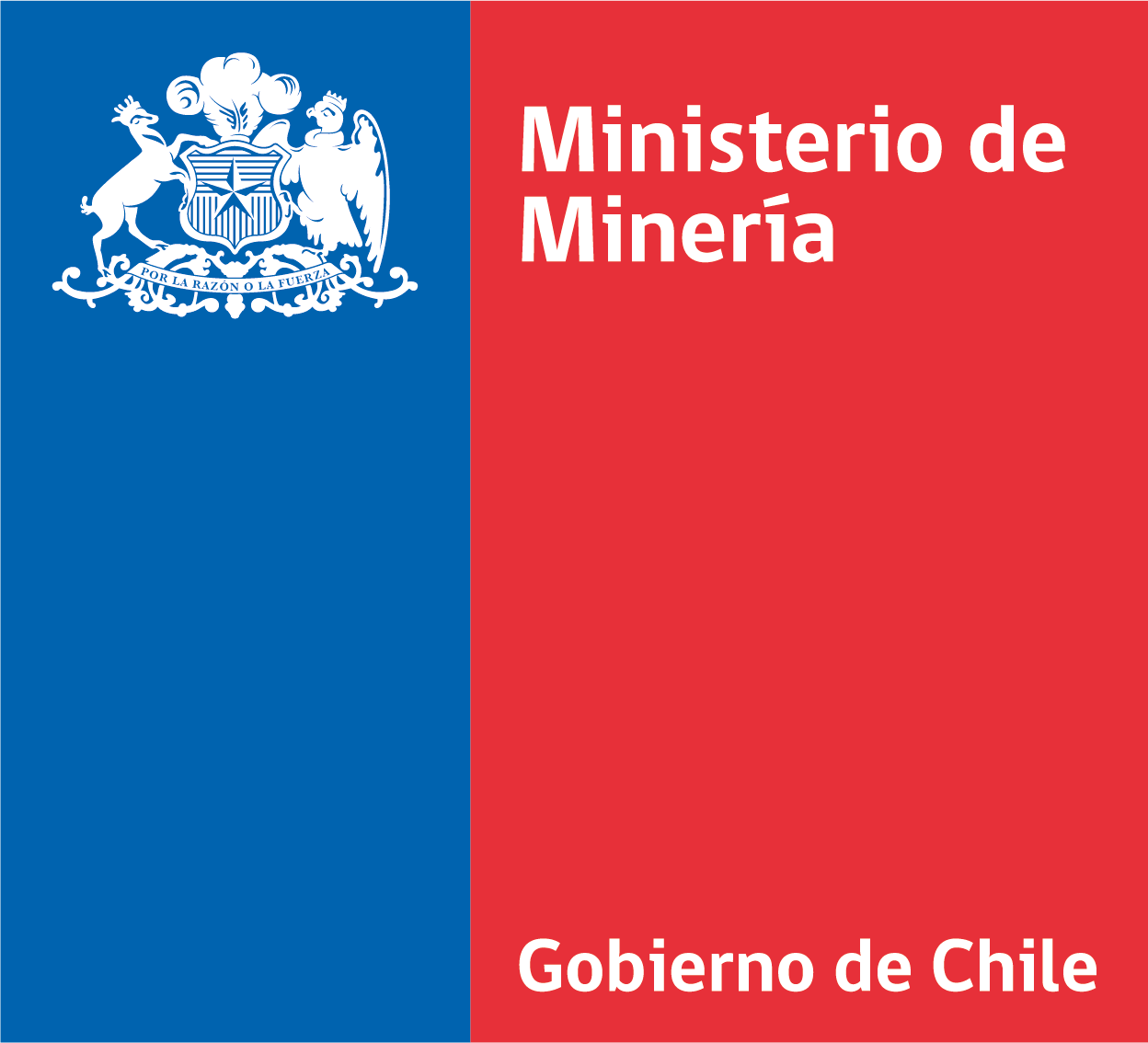

Agency overview
- Formed: 1953
- Preceding agency: • Ministry of Mines (March 1953–Jule 1953)
- Jurisdiction: Government of Chile
- Headquarters: Amunátegui 232 Santiago
- Ministers responsible: Daniel Mas, Minister of Mining; Suina Chahuán Kim, Undersecretary of Mining
- Website: https://www.minmineria.cl

The Ministry of Mining (Spanish: Ministerio de Minería) is the cabinet-level administrative office in charge of matters related to mining in Chile. The minister of mining in Chile is also the board president of the National Mining Enterprise (ENAMI).

The mining sector contributed 16.4% of Chile's gross domestic product in 2009, 14,157 billion pesos, mostly from copper mining.

In March 2026, Daniel Mas assumed the position of Minister of Mining.

== List of Ministers of Mining ==
The following are all Ministers of Mining (1953–Present)

| Picture | Name | Entered office | Exited office | Notes | Appointed by |
|---|---|---|---|---|---|
| | Eduardo Paredes Martínez | 1953 | 1953 | | Carlos Ibáñez del Campo |
| | Rafael Tarud Siwady | 1953 | 1953 | | Carlos Ibáñez del Campo |
| | Clodomiro Almeyda Medina | 25 June, 1953 | 14 October, 1953 | | Carlos Ibáñez del Campo |
| | Francisco Cuevas Mackenna | 1953 | 1954 | | Carlos Ibáñez del Campo |
| | Alejandro Hales | 1954 | 1954 | | Carlos Ibáñez del Campo |
| | Roberto Aldunate | 1954 | 1954 | | Carlos Ibáñez del Campo |
| | Armando Uribe | 1954 | 1955 | | Carlos Ibáñez del Campo |
| | Diego Lira Vergara | 1955 | 1955 | | Carlos Ibáñez del Campo |
| | Osvaldo Sainte Marie | 1955 | 1957 | | Carlos Ibáñez del Campo |
| | Emilio González | 1957 | 1958 | | Carlos Ibáñez del Campo |
| | Roberto Vergara Herrera | 1958 | 1960 | | Jorge Alessandri Rodríguez |
| | Enrique Serrano de Viale Rigo | 1960 | 1961 | | Jorge Alessandri Rodríguez |
| | Julio Chaná | 1961 | 1962 | | Jorge Alessandri Rodríguez |
| | Joaquín Prieto Concha | 1962 | 1963 | | Jorge Alessandri Rodríguez |
| | Luis Palacios Rossini | 1963 | 1964 | | Jorge Alessandri Rodríguez |
| | Eduardo Simián Gallet | 1964 | 1966 | | Eduardo Frei Montalva |
| | Alejandro Hales | 1966 | 1970 | | Eduardo Frei Montalva |
| | Orlando Cantuarias Zepeda | 1970 | 1972 | | Salvador Allende |
| | Mauricio Jungk Stahl | 1972 | 1972 | | Salvador Allende |
| | Pedro Palacios Cameron | 1972 | 1972 | | Salvador Allende |
| | Jorge Arrate | June 17, 1972 | July 10, 1972 | Interim | Salvador Allende |
| | Alfonso David Lebón | 1972 | 1972 | | Salvador Allende |
| | Claudio Sepúlveda Donoso | 1972 | 1973 | | Salvador Allende |
| | Sergio Bitar Chacra | 1973 | 1973 | | Salvador Allende |
| | Pedro Ramírez Correa | 1973 | 1973 | | Salvador Allende |
| | Rolando González Acevedo | 1973 | 1973 | | Augusto Pinochet |
| | Arturo Yovane | 1973 | 1974 | | Augusto Pinochet |
| | Agustín Toro Dávila | 1974 | 1975 | | Augusto Pinochet |
| | Luis Valenzuela Blanquier | 1975 | 1978 | | Augusto Pinochet |
| | Carlos Quiñones | 1978 | 1980 | | Augusto Pinochet |
| | José Piñera Echenique | 1980 | 1981 | | Augusto Pinochet |
| | Hernán Felipe Errázuriz | 1981 | 1982 | | Augusto Pinochet |
| | Samuel Lira Ovalle | 1982 | 1988 | | Augusto Pinochet |
| | Pablo Barahona | 1988 | 1989 | | Augusto Pinochet |
| | Jorge López Bain | 1989 | 1990 | | Augusto Pinochet |
| | Juan Hamilton Depassier | 1990 | 1992 | | Patricio Aylwin |
| | Alejandro Hales | 1992 | 1994 | | Patricio Aylwin |
| | Benjamin Teplizky Lijavetzky | 1994 | 1997 | | Eduardo Frei Ruiz-Tagle |
| | Sergio Jiménez Moraga | 1997 | 2000 | | Eduardo Frei Ruiz-Tagle |
| | José de Gregorio Rebeco | 2000 | 2001 | | Eduardo Frei Ruiz-Tagle |
| | Jorge Rodríguez Grossi | 2001 | 2002 | | Ricardo Lagos |
| | Alfonso Dulanto Rencoret | 2002 | 2006 | | Ricardo Lagos |
| | Karen Poniachik | 2006 | 2008 | | Michelle Bachelet |
| | Santiago González Larraín | 2008 | 2010 | | Michelle Bachelet |
| | Laurence Golborne | 2010 | 2011 | | Sebastián Piñera |
| | Hernán de Solminihac | 2011 | 2014 | | Sebastián Piñera |
| | Aurora Williams | 2014 | 2018 | | Michelle Bachelet |
| | Baldo Prokurica Prokurica | 2018 | 2020 | | Sebastián Piñera |
| | Juan Carlos Jobet | 2020 | 2022 | | Sebastián Piñera |
| | Marcela Hernando Pérez | 2022 | 2023 | | Gabriel Boric |
| | Aurora Williams | 2023 | 2026 | | Gabriel Boric |
| | Daniel Mas | 2026 | Incumbent | | José Antonio Kast |

== See also ==
- Coal mining in Chile
- Codelco – the largest copper mining company in the world, owned by the Chilean state
- Copper mining in Chile
- Copper Stabilization Fund – fund created to manage income from copper mining
- Gold mining in Chile
- Illegal mining in Chile
- Iron mining in Chile
- Lithium mining in Chile
- List of copper smelters in Chile
- Sociedad Nacional de Minería – Chilean association of mining companies
- Pirquinero – artisanal miners in Chile
