= Arturo Longton (television personality) =

Chilean television personality (born 1978)

- Born: 10 August 1978 (age 47); Viña del Mar, Chile
- Occupation: Show business personality
- Height: 1.77 m (5 ft 10 in)
- Parent(s): Arturo Longton; Amelia Herrera
- Relatives: Andrés Longton (brother); Alfonso de Urresti (cousin)

Arturo Longton Herrera (born 10 August 1978) is a Chilean television personality who has gained notoriety for his featuring in 2000s or 2010s Chilean reality television shows as well as in the films of Stefan Kramer, where he was portrayed by the same impressionist and is situated alongside Miguel Piñera, brother of Sebastián Piñera, twice president of Chile.

He comes from a family heavily linked to politics, in which his father was mayor and deputy as well as his mother. Similarly, his brother, Andrés, is deputy.

One of his most regarded appearances was his participation in the reality show La granja (The Farm).

== Filmography ==
=== Reality television shows ===
Year	Reality show	Result	Channel
2005	La granja	Finalist	Canal 13
2006	Expedición Robinson: La Isla Vip	Left game; 16th place	Canal 13
2009	1810	Eliminated	Canal 13
2012	Mundos Opuestos	Eliminated	Canal 13
2023	Tierra Brava	Participating	Canal 13

=== Films ===
Year	Movie	Character
2012	Stefan v/s Kramer	Himself
2013	El Ciudadano Kramer	Himself

== See also ==
- List of Chileans
