= Laura Soto =

Chilean politician

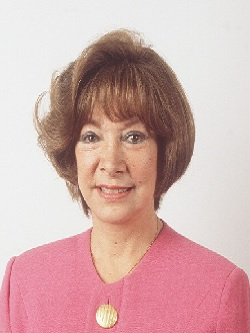

Member of the Chamber of Deputies
- In office 11 March 2002 – 11 March 2010
- Preceded by: Francisco Bartolucci
- Succeeded by: Aldo Cornejo
- Constituency: 13th District (Valparaíso, Easter Island and Juan Fernández)
- In office 11 March 1998 – 11 March 2002
- Preceded by: José Makluf
- Succeeded by: Rodrigo González Torres
- Constituency: 14th District (Viña del Mar and Concón)

Member of the Senate of Chile
- In office 11 March 1990 – 11 March 1994
- Preceded by: District created
- Succeeded by: Juan Hamilton Depassier
- Constituency: 6th Circunscription (Valparaíso Costa)

Personal details
- Born: 15 December 1931 (age 94) Valparaíso, Chile
- Party: Christian Democratic Party (1957–1973); Party for Democracy (1987–present)
- Spouse: Enrique Paniagua
- Children: Two
- Parent(s): Humberto Soto; Juana González
- Education: University of Chile (LL.B)
- Occupation: Politician
- Profession: Lawyer

Laura Filomena Soto González (born 15 December 1931) is a Chilean politician who served as Senator and Deputy in her country.

== Biography ==
=== Family and youth ===
She was born in Santiago on 15 December 1931. She was the daughter of Humberto Soto Cáceres and Juana González Larraín. She married Enrique Paniagua Jegó and was the mother of two daughters. One of them, Marisol Paniagua Soto, served as a municipal councillor of Valparaíso between 2004 and 2008.

=== Professional career ===
She completed her primary education at School No. 10 of Valparaíso and her secondary education at Girls’ High School No. 2 of the same city. In 1950, she entered the Faculty of Law of the University of Chile (Valparaíso campus), obtaining a degree in Legal and Social Sciences with the thesis “Law of the Sea: Maritime Sovereignty of the State”. She was admitted to the bar before the Supreme Court of Chile.

After qualifying as a lawyer, she worked as a Local Police Court Judge in the Municipality of Punta Arenas and in the Third Naval Zone of the Chilean Navy. Professionally, she specialized in Labor and Criminal Law.

Following the 1973 military coup, she served as a collaborating lawyer for the Pro Peace Committee, the predecessor of the Vicariate of Solidarity, and later acted as a legal advisor to that institution.

== Political career ==
Her political career began in the Christian Democratic Party of Chile, initially as an active member at its founding stage and later as a regional president.

She also served as president of the Group of 24 in Valparaíso, an organization dedicated to studying the drafting of a democratic alternative to the 1980 Constitution. She was subsequently appointed national councillor of the Human Rights Commission, eventually assuming its vice-presidency.

With the founding of the Party for Democracy in late 1987, she became one of the party’s founders in the Valparaíso Region, serving as its Regional President.

During the government of President Eduardo Frei Ruiz-Tagle, she was appointed Ambassador of Chile to Nicaragua, a position she held between 1994 and 2000.
