= Sergio Jiménez Moraga =

Chilean politician

Minister of Mining
- In office 3 August 1997 – 11 March 2000
- President: Eduardo Frei Ruíz-Tagle
- Preceded by: Benjamín Teplizky
- Succeeded by: José De Gregorio

Personal details
- Born: 18 August 1933 (age 93) Santiago, Chile
- Party: Radical Party (2018−present); Radical Social Democratic Party (1994−2018)
- Spouse(s): Clarita García-Huidobro; María Lourdes Correa (second wife)
- Children: Six
- Parent: Javier Jiménez Gundián
- Education: University of Chile (B.Sc)
- Occupation: Politician
- Profession: Civil engineer

Sergio Jiménez Moraga (18 August 1933) is a Chilean politician who served as minister.

== Personal life and education ==
The son of Javier Jiménez Gundián, he was a member of the Radical Party of Chile (PR) and a Freemason.

He first married Clarita Alfonso García-Huidobro. After being widowed, he married María Lourdes Correa Solar, with whom he had six children.

He attended San Pedro Nolasco School in Santiago before studying civil engineering. He also completed postgraduate studies in project evaluation.

== Professional career ==
He began his professional career as a civil engineer, designing infrastructure projects and low-cost housing developments. He later joined the Ministry of Public Works (MOP), where he rose through the technical ranks to become Deputy Technical Director of the Highways Directorate. Between 1968 and 1970, he also served on the Transport Commission that recommended the construction of the Santiago Metro.

He served as secretary of the Colegio de Ingenieros de Chile from 1982 to 1988 and was a director of the Institute of Engineers.

From 1990 to 1992, he was general manager of the Metro de Santiago. Between 1992 and 1994, he served as chairman of the power generation company Edelnor. From 1995 to 1997, he was a director of the National Petroleum Company (ENAP). Beginning in 1994, he was a full professor at the Universidad La República. In November 1996, he became general manager of the Empresa Metropolitana de Obras Sanitarias (EMOS).

In 1997, following the sudden death of fellow Radical Party member Benjamín Teplizky, he was appointed Minister of Mining. After leaving office in 2000, his departure was followed by controversy over the large severance payments awarded to senior executives of state-owned companies under his ministry's oversight.

He later served as president of the Capital Goods Technological Development Corporation (CBC).
