= Jorge Santibáñez Ceardi =

Chilean politician (1934–2020)

Jorge Santibáñez
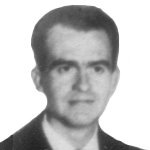

Mayor of Vina del Mar
- In office 11 October 1994 – 11 October 1996
- Preceded by: Rodrigo González Torres
- Succeeded by: Rodrigo González Torres

Councilman of Vina del Mar
- In office 11 October 1992 – 11 October 1994

Member of the Chamber of Deputies of Chile
- In office 15 May 1965 – 15 May 1973

Personal details
- Born: 1 March 1934 Santiago, Chile
- Died: 30 July 2020 (aged 86) Viña del Mar, Chile
- Party: Christian Democracy; Social Christian Movement; Union of the Centrist Center; Renovación Nacional
- Education: Pontifical Catholic University of Valparaíso (LL.B)
- Profession: Lawyer

Jorge Santibáñez Ceardi (1 March 1934 – 30 July 2020) was a Chilean politician and lawyer.

== Biography ==
Santibáñez Ceardi was born on 1 March 1934 in Santiago to Chilean Navy admiral Julio Santibáñez Escobar and his wife Adriana Ceardi Ferrer. Santibáñez Ceardi attended Sacred Hearts College in Santiago, studied law at the Catholic University of Valparaíso and worked with Alberto Ceardi between 1954 and 1958. Santibáñez Ceardi began practicing law in 1958.

His political career began in 1960 with a stint as alderman in Viña del Mar, as a member of the Christian Democratic Party. He ran for the Valparaíso Region seat on the Chamber of Deputies in 1965, and remained in office until 15 May 1973. His affiliation with the Christian Democratic Party ended after the 1973 Chilean coup d'état, which he endorsed. He returned to the city council of Viña del Mar in 1992, and served as mayor of the city from 1994 to 1996, while a member of the Union of the Centrist Center. Santibáñez Ceardi ended his political career as a member of the National Renewal party, stepping down from the municipal council in 2000.

Santibáñez Ceardi died at the age of 86 on 30 July 2020.
