= Arturo Yovane =

Ambassador of Chile to Iran
- In office 12 July 1974 – 1976
- President: Augusto Pinochet
- Preceded by: Office established
- Succeeded by: Felipe Geiger

Ministry of Mining
- In office 11 September 1973 – 11 July 1974
- President: Augusto Pinochet
- Preceded by: Rolando González Acevedo
- Succeeded by: Agustín Toro Dávila

General Subdirector of Carabineros de Chile
- In office 12 September 1973 – 11 July 1974
- President: Augusto Pinochet

Personal details
- Born: Chile
- Died: 24 September 1997
- Education: Carlos Ibáñez del Campo School
- Profession: Police officer

Military service
- Allegiance: Carabineros
- Rank: General

Arturo Yovane Zúñiga († September 24, 1997) was a Chilean Carabineros general who was among the first who instigated the coup d'etat project of 1973 and recruited César Mendoza to that same end. Once the dictatorship was established he was appointed minister of mining. Being part of a dissident faction within the dictatorship he was hastily removed from the ministry in 1974 and appointed ambassador at the newly established Chilean embassy in Tehran.
