= Rodrigo González Torres =

Chilean politician (1941–2022)

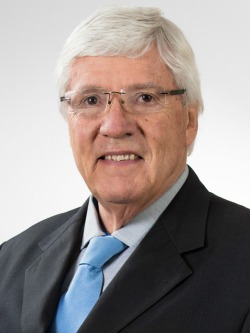

Second Vice President of the Chamber of Deputies of Chile
- In office 7 April 2020 – 11 March 2022
- Preceded by: Pepe Auth

Member of the Chamber of Deputies
- In office 11 March 2018 – 11 March 2022
- In office 11 March 2002 – 11 March 2018
- Preceded by: Laura Soto
- Succeeded by: Redistricted

Mayor of Viña del Mar
- In office 11 October 1996 – 1 September 2000
- Preceded by: Jorge Santibáñez Ceardi
- Succeeded by: Roberto Parra Vallette
- In office 26 October 1992 – 11 October 1994
- Preceded by: Víctor Henríquez Garat
- Succeeded by: Jorge Santibáñez Ceardi

Personal details
- Born: 26 September 1941 Viña del Mar, Chile
- Died: 4 September 2022 (aged 80) Viña del Mar, Chile
- Party: Party for Democracy (1987–2022); Popular Unitary Action Movement (1969–1973)
- Education: Pontifical Catholic University of Valparaíso; University of Sorbonne

Rodrigo René González Torres (26 September 1941 – 4 September 2022) was a Chilean politician. He served as Second Vice President of the Chamber of Deputies of Chile and as a member of the Chamber of Deputies representing District 7 of the Valparaíso Region. He previously served twice as mayor of Viña del Mar.
