= Richard Rubin (TV personality) =

American television personality and entertainer (born 1983)

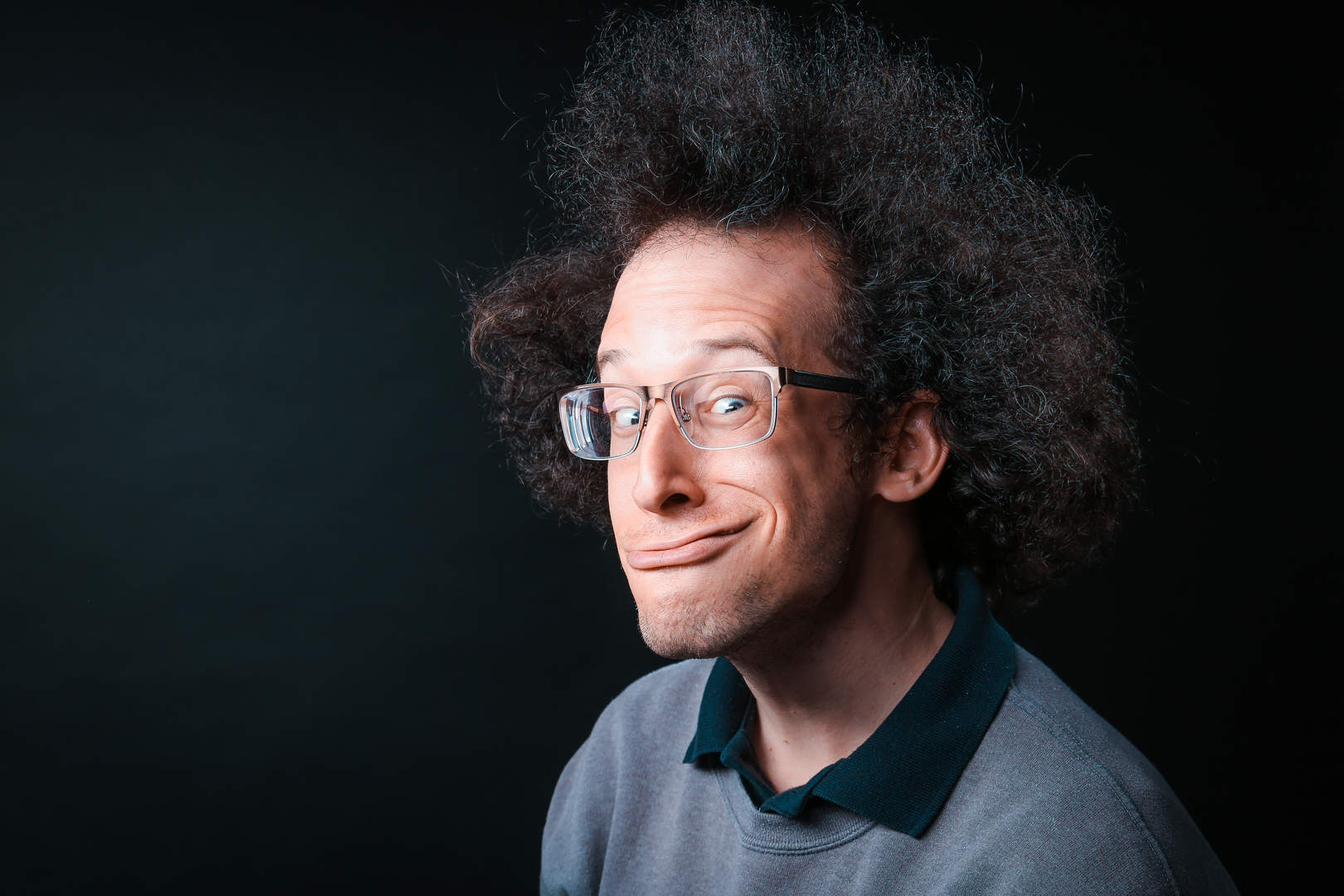
- Born: April 8, 1983 (age 43); Flemington, New Jersey
- Occupations: Television personality, entertainer
- Years active: 2005–present
- Website: http://www.richardrubin.com

Richard Rubin (born April 8, 1983) is an American television personality and entertainer best known for starring on the first season of the Ashton Kutcher-produced reality TV series Beauty and the Geek, as well as for his work in Latin America on Spanish-language television programs.

== Personal life ==
Rubin was born and raised in Flemington, New Jersey and graduated from Hunterdon Central Regional High School in 2001. He graduated Phi Beta Kappa from Brandeis University in 2005 with a double major in Spanish and History. He is an accomplished ragtime piano player.

== Career ==
=== Beauty and the Geek ===
Rubin was a contestant on the first series of Beauty and the Geek in 2005. It started on The WB network and continued subsequently on The CW network. He and his partner, Mindi Emanuel, were the runners-up. Rubin also assisted in the casting of the second season.

=== 1 vs. 100 ===
Rubin was a celebrity mob member on seven episodes of the second season of the Bob Saget-hosted NBC prime time gameshow 1 vs. 100, along with Ross Mathews, Sommore, Oscar the Grouch, and Nicole, Erica, and Jaclyn Dahm.

Flor de Palabra

In 2009, Rubin, along with Florencia Pena, hosted Flor de palabra, the Argentine version of the game show 20Q, on Telefe. The show was filmed on location in Buenos Aires and done in Spanish.

Mundos Opuestos 2

Rubin starred on the hit Chilean reality television show, Mundos Opuestos, which was the original version of the American reality show Opposite Worlds. It aired on Canal 13. Apart from his sense of humor and unusual personality, he was known for surprising the public by winning many duels of elimination.

=== Guest appearances ===
Rubin has guest starred on television shows for such networks as VH1, E!, Fox Reality, Comedy Central, Nickelodeon, TV Guide, G4, and MTV, and has been a guest on Live with Regis and Kelly, Jimmy Kimmel Live!, The Tyra Banks Show, and The Today Show. He co-presented the award for Choice Hottie with Shannon Elizabeth at the 2005 Teen Choice Awards, and co-presented the award for Favorite Judge/Host with Brooke Hogan at the 2007 Fox Reality Really Awards.

- Beauty and the Geek (series contestant)
- Best Week Ever (talking head)
- Punk'd (guest appearance)
- Teen Choice Awards (presenter)
- Attack of the Show (guest appearance)
- 10 Ways to Be a Cover Story Couple (guest appearance)
- Rise of the Geeks (guest appearance)
- Unfabulous (as "Sherman")
- Second Jamm-X Kids All-Star Dance Special (guest appearance)
- Reality Remix (correspondent)
- The Search for the Next Elvira (guest appearance)
- Fox Really Awards (presenter)
- Where Are They Now? (guest appearance)
- 1 vs. 100 (series mob member)
- Reality Binge (guest appearance)
- Reality Bites Back (guest judge)
- Flor de Palabra (series co-host)
- Mundos Opuestos 2 (Canal 13, Chile)
