= Alejandro Hales =

Chilean lawyer, diplomat and politician (1923–2001)

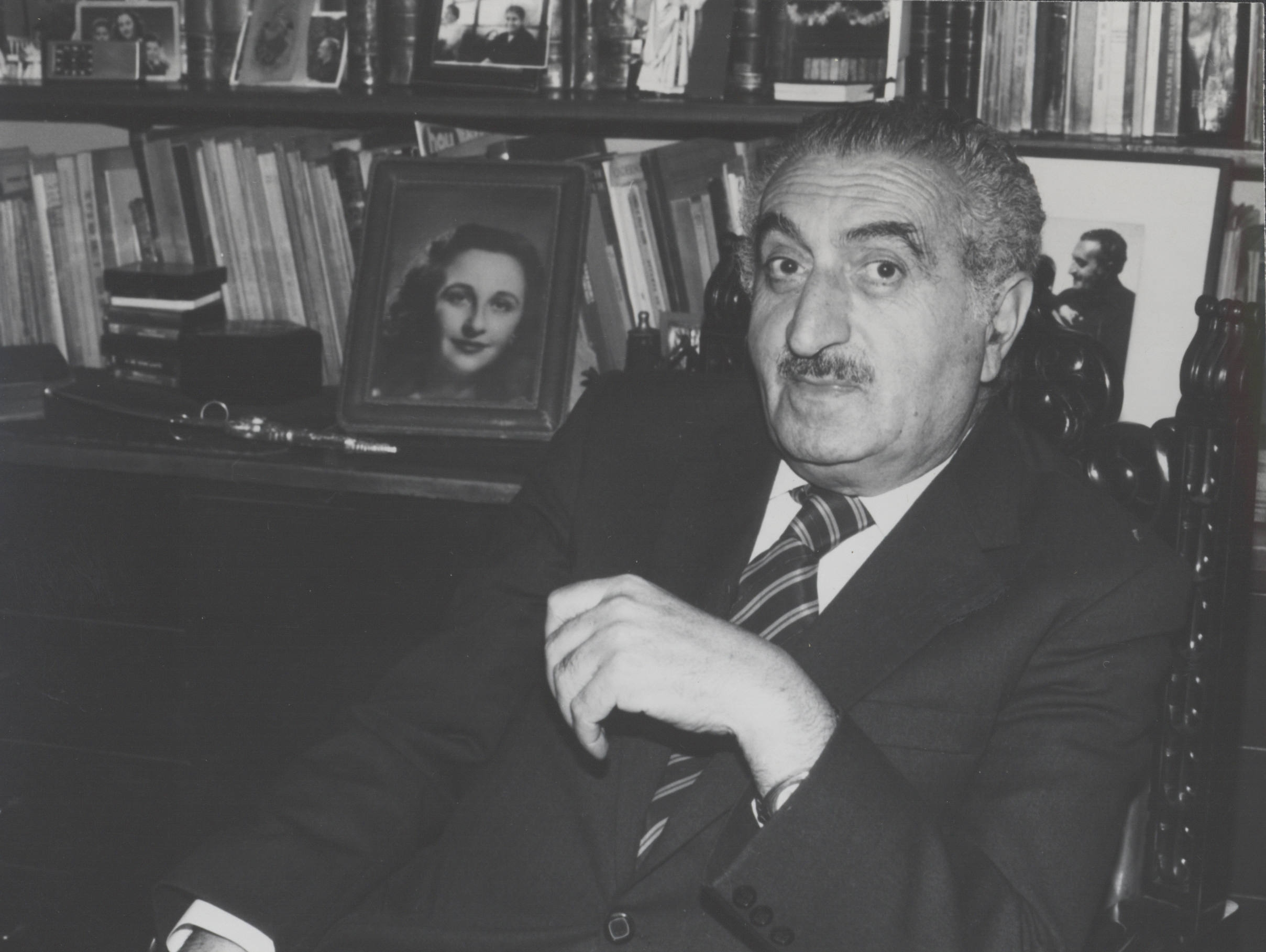

Councilman of Ñuñoa
- In office 6 December 1996 – 6 December 2000

Minister of Mining
- In office 28 September 1992 – 11 March 1994
- President: Patricio Aylwin
- Preceded by: Juan Hamilton
- Succeeded by: Benjamín Teplizky
- In office 21 October 1966 – 3 November 1970
- President: Eduardo Frei Montalva
- Preceded by: Eduardo Simián
- Succeeded by: Orlando Cantuarias
- In office 19 January 1954 – 3 March 1954
- President: Carlos Ibáñez del Campo
- Preceded by: Francisco Cuevas Mackenna
- Succeeded by: Roberto Aldunate

Ambassador of Chile to Bolivia
- In office 1 May 1954 – 3 November 1958
- President: Carlos Ibáñez del Campo
- Preceded by: Luis Bravo Rau
- Succeeded by: Higinio González Nolle

Minister of Lands and Colonization
- In office 1 April 1953 – 4 July 1953
- President: Carlos Ibáñez del Campo
- Preceded by: Venancio Coñuepán Huenchual
- Succeeded by: Jorge Muñoz de Closets

Minister of Agriculture
- In office 1 April 1953 – 5 June 1953
- President: Carlos Ibáñez del Campo
- Preceded by: Francisco Acevedo Trillot
- Succeeded by: Eugenio Suárez Herreros

Personal details
- Born: 23 April 1923 Temuco, Chile
- Died: 7 April 2001 (aged 77) Santiago, Chile
- Party: Agrarian Labor Party; Christian Democratic Party (1996–2001)
- Spouse: Adela Dib
- Children: Four (among them, Patricio)
- Education: University of Chile (LL.B)
- Profession: Lawyer

Alejandro Hales Jamarne (April 23, 1923 – April 7, 2001) was a Chilean lawyer, diplomat and politician. He was a member of the Agrarian Labor Party. He served as the Minister of Agriculture from April 1953 to June 1954.

He served as the Chilean Ambassador to Bolivia from 1954 to 1958. He also served as the Minister of Mining from September 1992 to March 1994.

== Family and education ==
He was born in the Chilean city of Temuco on 23 April 1923, the son of Demetrio Hales Hales and Julia Jamarne Manzur, Jordanian immigrants settled in Chile since 1913. He was one of the four children born to the marriage; the others were Frida, Renato, Ilés, and Enrique. He completed his primary education at the Instituto de Humanidades San José of Temuco. Later, in 1940, he entered the University of Chile to study law, qualifying as a lawyer in 1946 with the thesis Cooperativism in the past and in the present. He took his professional oath on 2 January 1947.

He married Adela Dib Sanhueza in Traiguén in 1945, with whom he had four children: Patricio, an architect who served as a member of the Chamber of Deputies of the Republic for five consecutive legislative terms between 1994 and 2014; Jaime, a lawyer and writer; Cecilia, a physician; and Carmen Andrea, a psychologist.

== Political career ==
=== Minister under Carlos Ibáñez ===
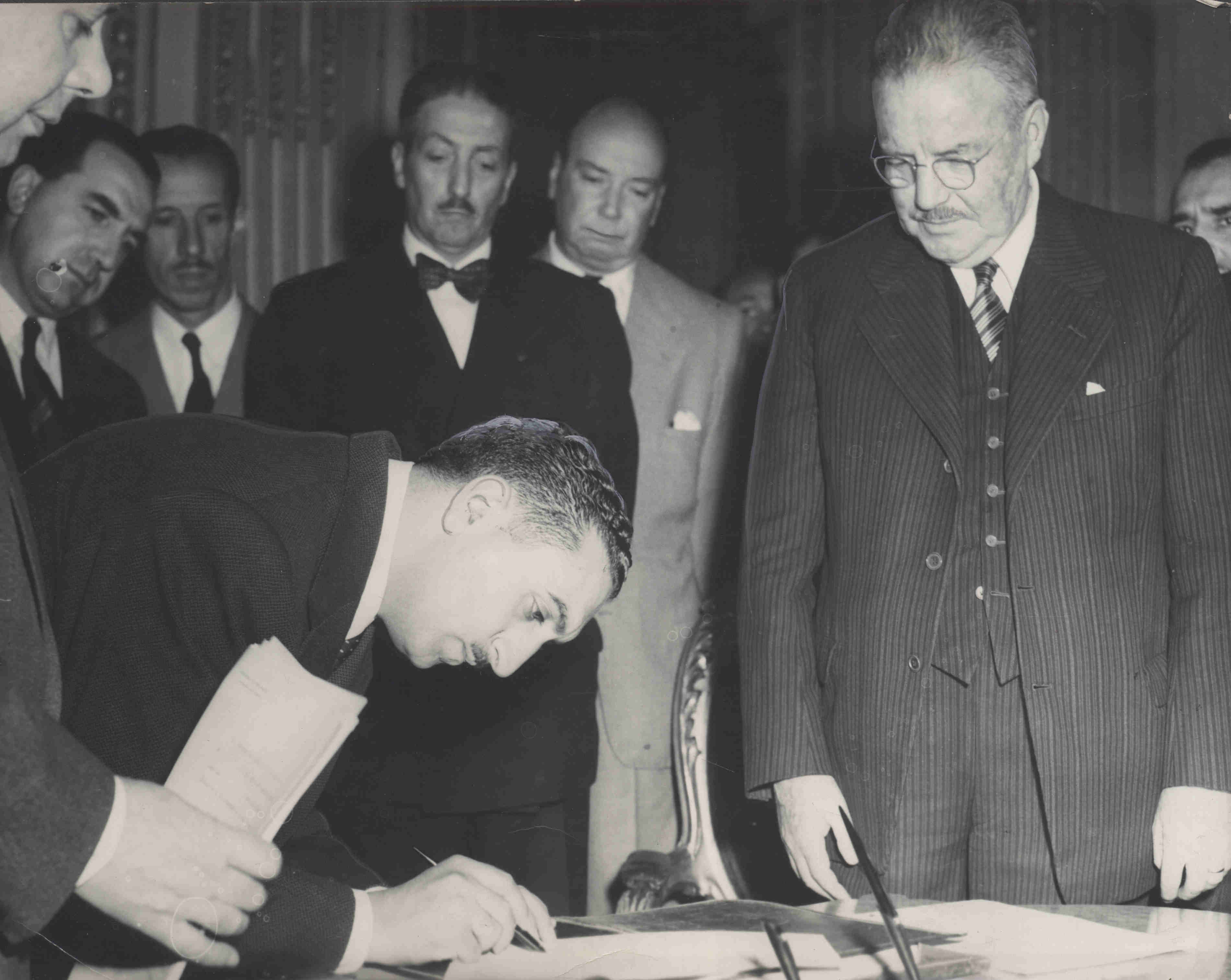
Hales assumes office as a minister of State under Carlos Ibáñez, who observes him on the right.

He became involved in politics while still a university student, during which time he rose to become a senior leader of the Federation of Students of the University of Chile (FECh).

He joined the Agrarian Labor Party (PAL) when it was founded in 1942 in Temuco, representing farmers from the Cautín Province. This political party was one of the main pillars of the 1952 presidential campaign of General Carlos Ibáñez del Campo, who was part of the wave of socializing nationalisms spreading across Latin America.

In this context, he served as secretary general of Ibáñez’s presidential campaign. As a result, in 1953, once victory had been achieved, he was appointed joint minister of Agriculture and of Lands and Colonization, at just thirty years of age. In 1954, the portfolio of Mining was added to his responsibilities for a few weeks.

Between 1954 and 1958, he served as a political ambassador of Chile to Bolivia.

=== Ally of Frei Montalva ===
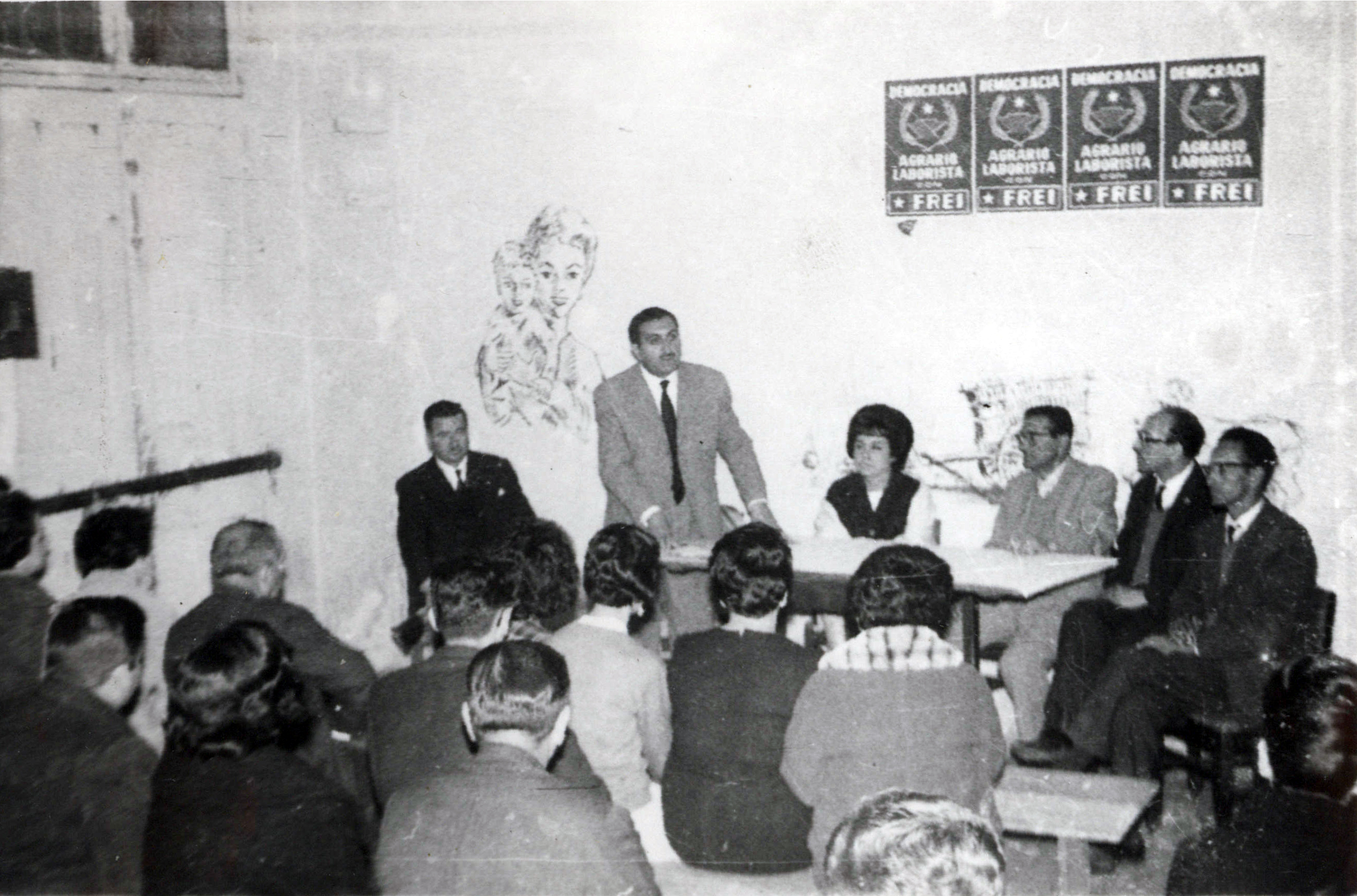
Hales together with leaders of the Agrarian Labor Democracy.

In 1964, together with a small number of leaders from his former political party, he formed the Agrarian Labor Democracy to support the presidential campaign of Eduardo Frei Montalva, who would go on to win the 1964 Chilean presidential election.

He participated in the 1965 parliamentary elections as a candidate for senator representing the 8th Provincial Grouping of Biobío, Malleco, and Cautín, but was not elected.

That same year he was appointed president of the National Wheat Commission. Previously, he had served as a director of the State Bank of Chile, as an adviser to the state-owned Production Development Corporation (Corfo), and from 1966 he once again served as Minister of Mining.

During this period, he oversaw the inauguration of the Ventanas refinery of the National Mining Company (Enami). In 1967, he traveled to Zambia to participate in the meeting of Ministers of Mining that created the Intergovernmental Council of Copper Exporting Countries (CIPEC).

As a minister under Eduardo Frei Montalva, he took part in one of the major milestones in the history of mining in the country: the Chilenization of copper.

In 1972, he was elected president of the Center for Economic and Political Studies. During this period, and progressively, he became an active opponent of the government of President Salvador Allende, going so far as to organize large demonstrations and marches by miners from El Teniente.

For the 1973 parliamentary elections, he played an important role in the campaign command of Eduardo Frei Montalva, who, once elected, assumed the presidency of the Senate of Chile.

=== Opposition to Pinochet ===
Following the coup d'état of 11 September 1973, for a brief period he expressed support for the military intervention, given his status as an opponent of the government of the Popular Unity (UP) and in line with his diagnosis of the political situation the country was experiencing. In this capacity, he provided advisory services in the field of mining to the new authorities, without assuming an official post.

However, due to his direct experience with excesses and human rights violations, he adopted a critical stance that would lead to outright rejection. During this period, he served as president of the Chilean Bar Association, from where he defended the human rights violated by the regime of Augusto Pinochet. This resulted in one of his daughters being kidnapped and tortured, and one of his sons being detained and imprisoned by the dictatorship. In 1987, he publicly stated that the Judiciary had processed only a dozen of the more than seven thousand writ of protection filed by relatives of victims of human rights violations.

In 1988, he served as president of the movement Independents for Democratic Consensus, and in 1989 he was a presidential pre-candidate.

=== Concertación era ===
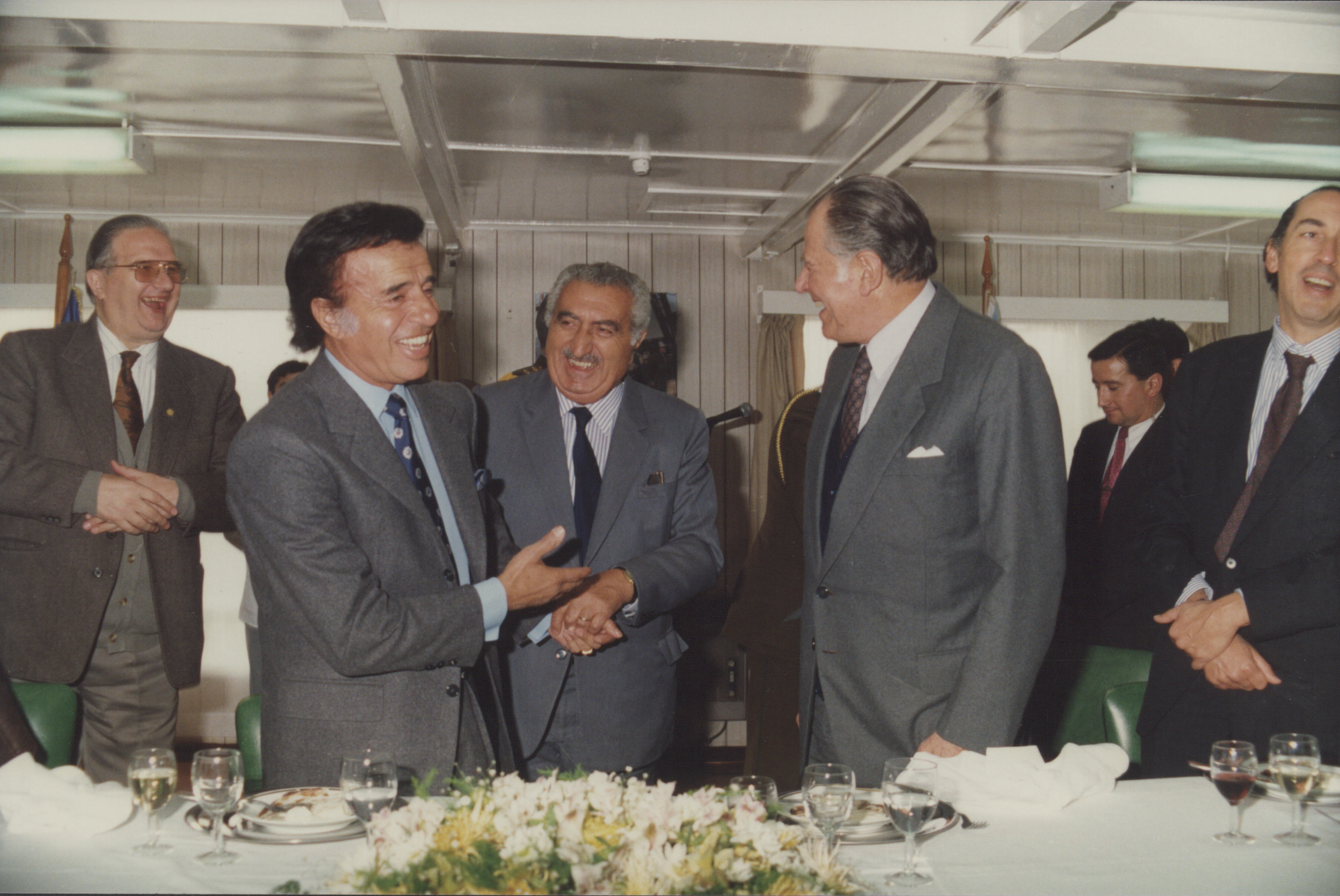
Hales between Presidents Carlos Menem (left) and Patricio Aylwin (right).

Following the return to democracy, he was appointed, in 1992, Minister of Mining, this time by President Patricio Aylwin.

He was required to chair the board of directors of Codelco, where he stood out for promoting exploration of the Mansa Mina ore deposit. He also represented the country’s highest authority on the board of the State Bank.

In October 1996, he was elected councilor of the Municipality of Ñuñoa, with 20,371 votes, or 21.14%, the second-highest vote total in the municipality, which prevented him from becoming mayor. He resigned shortly before his death due to health problems arising from stomach cancer.
