= Eduardo Simián =

Chilean footballer and politician

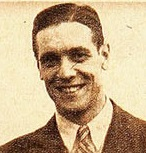

Minister of Mining
- In office 3 November 1964 – 21 October 1966
- President: Eduardo Frei Montalva
- Preceded by: Luis Palacios Rossini
- Succeeded by: Alejandro Hales

Personal details
- Born: 16 November 1915 Santiago, Chile
- Died: 15 December 1995 (aged 80) Santiago, Chile
- Party: Christian Democratic Party (1991−1995)
- Spouse: Eliana Díaz Lemonon
- Children: Five
- Parent(s): María Luisa Gallet; Emilio Simián
- Education: University of Chile (BA)
- Occupation: Footballer; Politician
- Profession: Mining engineer
Association football career
- Position: Goalkeeper
Senior career*
Years	Team	Apps	(Gls)
1935–1940	Universidad de Chile	50	(0)
1942	Universidad de Chile	1	(0)
1946	Universidad de Chile	1	(0)
Total		52	(0)
International career
1939	Chile	3	(0)
- * Club domestic league appearances and goals

Juan Eduardo Simián Gallet (16 November 1915 − 14 December 1995) was a Chilean footballer and politician who served as minister of State during Eduardo Frei Montalva's government. Simián is considered a historical player of Club Universidad de Chile.

== Football career ==
=== Club career ===
Simián began his career at Club Universidad de Chile aged 20 while he was doing his BA in mining engineering at the University of Chile, where he graduated in 1938.

During the 1938 Primera División de Chile season, he was part of the Universidad de Chile champion team which obtained the First Division title under the orders of the player-coach Luis Tirado. Simian's impressive performances led the press to consider him as one of the best players of early Chilean football.

In 1940, Simián stopped his football career after obtaining a scholarship from the Production Development Corporation (Corfo) to research in the US on geological exploration, geophysics, and drilling of exploration wells. Once ended his spell in the US, in 1942, he returned to play in Universidad de Chile, but only for the Clásico Universitario.

In 1946, Simián definitely retired from football aged 31 after playing another Clásico Universitario with Universidad de Chile. In total, he made fifty two appearances for them between 1938 and 1946.

=== International career ===
He played in three matches for the Chile national football team in 1939. He was also part of Chile's squad for the 1939 South American Championship.

== Political career ==
=== Beginnings at ENAP ===
After his experience in the US, the Corfo hired him in the early 1940s to plan operations in southern Chile. As head of the drilling team, on 29 September 1945, Simián participated in the discovery of the first oil well in the Magallanes Region.

In 1950, the president Gabriel González Videla—from the Radical Party (PR)—appointed him as the production manager of the state-owned company Empresa Nacional del Petróleo (ENAP).

=== 1958 parliamentary campaign ===
In 1958, Simián failed to reach a seat in the Senate after losing the elections of the 8th District of San Miguel. During his campaign, he was supported by Sergio Livingstone.

=== Minister of Mining ===
In 1964, the elected president Eduardo Frei Montalva called him to serve as Minister of Mining, an office he accepted and served until 1966.

During Simián's administration occurred the first stage of the Chilean nationalization of copper. The official initiative—also known as 'agreed nationalization'—was sent by Frei to the National Congress in September 1965. After an arduous debate, the text was approved in January 1966, giving rise to Law N°16.425 and the creation of the Chilean Copper Corporation, the seed of Codelco (National Copper Corporation of Chile). Similarly, in 1966, was enacted Law N°16.624. It created mixed companies owned in a 51% by the Chilean State.

=== Late career ===
In 1973, he became General Manager at ENAP (Empresa Nacional del Petróleo).

In 1988, he was one of the founders of the political movement Independientes por el Consenso Democrático.
