= Expedición Robinson: La Isla Vip =

- Presented by: Sergio Lagos; Karla Constant
- No. of days: 52
- No. of castaways: 16
- Winner: Marcela Roberts
- Runner-up: Fabricio Vasconcellos
- Location: Samaná Province, Dominican Republic
- No. of episodes: 13

Release
- Original network: Canal 13
- Original release: 19 July – 16 October 2006

Expedición Robinson: La Isla Vip is the Chilean version of the American reality television game show Survivor. The show premiered on July 19, 2006, and was recorded in the Dominican Republic and edited in Argentina. On October 16 Marcela Roberts won the final duel between Fabricio Vasconcellos winning $50.000.000 in the live finale.

== Contestants ==
List of Expedición Robinson: La Isla Vip contestants
Contestant	Original Tribe	Merged Tribe	Finish
Arturo Longton; 28, Finalist of La Granja	North Team		Left Competition; Day 2
César Ávila; Returned to Game	North Team		1st Voted Out; Day 4
Danitza Aliaga; 27, Marine biologist	South Team		2nd Voted Out; Day 8
Moyenei Valdés; 27, Singer	North Team		Medically Evacuated; Day 12
Javier Margas; 36, Former football player	North Team		3rd Voted Out; Day 16
César Ávila; 28, Winner of Operación Triunfo Chile	North Team		4th Voted Out; Day 20
María Laura Donoso; 35, Model	South Team		5th Voted Out; Day 24
Renato Munster; 43, Actor	South Team	Merge	6th Voted Out; Day 28
Paulo Iglesias; 37, Humorist	South Team	Merge	7th Voted Out; Day 32
Carlos Cruzat; 38, Boxer	South Team	Merge	8th Voted Out; Day 36
Constanza Moya; 21, Contestant of Granjeras	North Team	Merge	9th Voted Out; Day 40
Cristina Prieto; 29, Mountaineer	North Team	Merge	10th Voted Out; Day 44
Ronny Munizaga; 28, Dancer	North Team	Merge	11th Voted Out; Day 48
Rocío Marengo; 26, TV personality	North Team	Merge	12th Voted Out; Day 52
Janis Pope; 22, Contestant of Protagonistas de la Fama	South Team	Merge	13th Voted Out; Day 52
Fabricio Vasconcellos; 26, Dancer	South Team	Merge	Runner-up; Day 52
Marcela Roberts; 29, Finalist of Conquistadores del Fin del Mundo	South Team	Merge	Sole Survivor; Day 52

== The game ==
Week	Challenges			Eliminated	Vote	Finish
Week	Reward	Immunity	Talisman	Eliminated	Vote	Finish
July 17–24	North	South	Cristina	César	5–2	1st Voted Out; Day 4
July 25–31	South	North	Marcela	Danitza	5–2–1	2nd Voted Out; Day 8
August 1–7	South	South	César	Moyenei	None	Removed Due to Injury; Day 12
August 8–14	North	South	César	Javier	5–1	3rd Voted Out; Day 16
August 15–21	South	South	Cristina	César	3–1–1	4th Voted Out; Day 20
August 22–28	South	North	Fabricio	María Laura	5–1–1	5th Voted Out; Day 24
August 29 – September 4	Fabricio	Fabricio		Renato	5–5	6th Voted Out; Day 28
September 5–11	Fabricio	Fabricio		Paulo	5–4	7th Voted Out; Day 32
September 12–18	Fabricio	Janis		Carlos	6–2–1	8th Voted Out; Day 36
September 20–25	Ronny	Fabricio		Constanza	6–2	9th Voted Out; Day 40
September 25 – October 2	Cristina	Ronny		Cristina	4–2–1	10th Voted Out; Day 44
October 3–9	Fabricio	Janis		Ronny	3–3	11th Voted Out; Day 48
October 10–13				Rocío		12th Voted Out; Day 52
The Finale		Marcela (55.32%)		Janis	8–4	3rd Place

== Voting history ==
	Original tribes							Merged tribe											
Episode	1		2	3	4	5	6	7		8	9	10	11	12			13		
Day	2	4	8	12	16	20	24	28		32	36	40	44	48		52			
Tribe	North	North	South	North	North	North	South	Merge		Merge	Merge	Merge	Merge	Merge		Merge	Merge	Merge	
Eliminated	Arturo	César (Note: After Moyenei was evacuated from the game, César returned as her replacement)	Danitza	Moyenei	Javier	César	María Laura	Tie (Note: The first vote resulted in a tie. Per the rules, the person who had won immunity would cast the deciding vote.)	Renato	Paulo	Carlos	Constanza	Cristina	Tie	Ronny	Rocío	Janis	Fabricio	Marcela
Vote	Quit (Note: No vote; Arturo chose to quit the game.)	5-2	5-2-1	Evacuated (Note: No vote; Moyenei was medically evacuated from the game.)	5-1	3-1-1	5-1-1	5-5	1-0 (Note: Fabricio chose to eliminate Renato.)	5-4	6-2-1	6-2	4-2-1	3-3	1-0 (Note: Janis chose to eliminate Ronny.)	Challenge	8-4 (Note: After Marcela was declared a finalist, the previously eliminated contestants had to vote out either Fabricio or Janis, deciding the second finalist.)	Final challenge	
Voter	Votes																		
Marcela			Renato				Paulo	Paulo		Paulo	Rocío	Constanza	Cristina	Ronny		Won	Immune (Note: Marcela won the public's vote with 55.32% of the votes, granting her the first spot in the finale.)	Sole Survivor	
Fabricio			Danitza				María Laura	Renato	Renato	Carlos	Carlos	Constanza	Cristina	Marcela		Won	Safe	Runner-up	
Janis			Danitza				María Laura	Paulo		Paulo	Carlos	Constanza	Rocío	Ronny	Ronny	Won	Eliminated		
Rocío		César			Javier	César		Renato		Carlos	Carlos	Constanza	Cristina	Marcela		Lost	Janis		
Ronny		César			Javier	César		Renato		Carlos	Carlos	Constanza	Cristina	Marcela			Janis		
Cristina		César			Javier	César		Renato		Paulo	Carlos	Constanza	Janis	Ronny (Note: The previous person voted out was granted an extra vote.)			Fabricio		
Constanza		Moyenei			Javier	Rocío		Paulo		Paulo	Rocío	Rocío	Janis				Fabricio		
Carlos			Renato				María Laura	Paulo		Paulo	Ronny	Rocío					Fabricio		
Paulo			Danitza				María Laura	Renato		Carlos	Carlos						Janis		
Renato			Danitza				María Laura	Paulo									Janis		
María Laura			Danitza				Janis										Janis		
César		Moyenei			Javier	Ronny											Janis		
Javier		César			Constanza												Janis		
Moyenei		César															Janis		
Danitza			Janis														Fabricio		
Arturo																			
