= Love in the Wild =

- Created by: Endemol USA
- Presented by: Darren McMullen (season 1); Jenny McCarthy (season 2)
- Country of origin: United States
- Original language: English
- No. of seasons: 2
- No. of episodes: 16

Production
- Executive producers: Tom Shelly; Liz Schulze; Mark Allen; Eric Gardner
- Production locations: Costa Rica (season 1); Dominican Republic and Hawaii (season 2)
- Running time: 43–44 minutes 88 minutes (season 2 premiere)
- Production companies: Steele Mill Productions; Endemol USA

Original release
- Network: NBC
- Release: June 29, 2011 – July 25, 2012

Love in the Wild is a reality television series that debuted on June 29, 2011, on NBC. The show is created and produced by Endemol USA. The first season was hosted by Darren McMullen; season 2 premiered on June 5, 2012, with new host Jenny McCarthy.

== Format ==
Set in Costa Rica (season 1) or in Dominican Republic and Hawaii (season 2), the series begins with ten men and ten women, paired into couples. The couples must compete in challenges that test their own abilities and their compatibility as a team. Following each episode's adventure, the winning couple spends the night at a luxurious resort called the Oasis, while the other contestants stay in ordinary cabins and socialize with each other. The next day at the choice ceremony, contestants choose their partners for the next episode's challenge. The last remaining unmatched man and woman are eliminated. The series will conclude with one winning couple, who receive a trip around the world.

=== Choice ceremony and elimination rules ===
To illustrate the mechanics of the choice ceremony, the following example is provided using these fictional couples:

1. Anna and Adam
2. Barbra and Bob
3. Connie and Carl
4. Daisy and Doug love on the spectrum

Couples are ordered by their finish in the previous day's challenge. (The gender that chooses first from each couple alternates with each ceremony; i.e., if women go first in one ceremony, men will go first in the next ceremony.)

Anna may choose first whether she would like to stay with Adam or ask someone else to partner with her. Because she and Adam finished first, if either of them wishes to partner with someone else, the other contestant cannot refuse. Anna chooses to stay with Adam, and Adam chooses to stay with Anna. They move on together.

Barbra and Bob are next. Barbra asks Carl to be her partner, and Carl accepts, so Barbra and Carl move on together. Bob asks Connie to be his partner, and Connie refuses. Bob moves to the Singles Area.

Connie may now choose between asking Doug or Bob to partner with her (despite having already rejected Bob). Connie asks Doug to be her partner, and Doug accepts. Connie and Doug move on.

Daisy and Bob are the final two unmatched contestants, and are eliminated.

If Doug had refused to partner with Connie, Connie would have joined Bob in the Singles Area. Daisy and Doug would then each choose to either stay together or ask Bob or Connie to partner up. If Daisy and Doug then both chose to stay together, Daisy and Doug would move on despite finishing last in the challenge, and Bob and Connie would be eliminated.

If there are more than two contestants in the Singles Area after all couples have chosen, the single contestants (in the order of their arrival in the Singles Area) may attempt again to create a partnership with one of the other singles. If all the single contestants continue to decline any partnerships with each other, they will all be eliminated. This feature resulted in the double elimination of Season 1, Episode 6, when the four remaining Singles Area competitors were unable to form any couples.

The show format gives a strong advantage to loyal couples, as they are guaranteed to move ahead as long as they do not finish last in a challenge. (Even then, they will advance if there is anyone in the singles area.) There are few circumstances in which betrayal can be advantageous. (One case being that a member of a last-place couple may accept a switch request, and certain survival for one round, rather than count on a partner's loyalty.) Attempted switches may leave a contestant vulnerable to subsequent retaliation, as in Season 1, when Steele's switch attempt led to a retaliatory rejection by Erica which eliminated both of them. In Season 1, the last three couples had formed romantic bonds which helped protect them from elimination.

Mike and Samantha won Season 1 and earned a trip around the world together.

== Season 1 (2011) ==
=== Contestants ===
Females
Contestant	Age	Hometown
Samantha Woods	23	Huntington Beach, California
Heather Pond	23	Sonoma, California
Theresa Trujillo	24	San Jose, California
Brandee Dillehay	25	Nashville, Tennessee
Erica Scherle	24	Nashville, Tennessee
Jessica "Jess" DeBolt	24	San Francisco, California
Jessica Soares	23	Bridgewater, Massachusetts
Kym Nguyen	24	Quincy, Massachusetts
Vanessa Guerrero	26	Phoenix, Arizona
Dawn Christjaener	27	Scottsdale, Arizona

Males
Contestant	Age	Hometown
Michael "Mike" Spiro	29	San Francisco, California
Miles Haefner	28	St. Louis Park, Minnesota
Skip Sullivan	30	Milton, Massachusetts
Benjamin "Ben" Hooker	27	Charleston, South Carolina
Steele Dewald	24	Scottsdale, Arizona
Derek Leach	28	Venice, California
Jason Jackson	28	San Francisco, California
Adam Rose	25	Taunton, Massachusetts
Peter Paris	31	Venice, California
Jared Ines	28	Los Angeles, California

=== Men ===
Partners	1	2	3	4	5 (Mandatory Switch)	6	7	8 (Finale)
Mike	Samantha	Samantha	Samantha	Samantha	Samantha (Theresa)	Samantha	Samantha	Samantha
Miles	Erica	Heather	Erica	Heather	Heather (Brandee)	Heather	Heather	Heather
Skip	Jessica	Theresa	Theresa	Theresa	Theresa (Jess)	Theresa	Theresa	
Ben	Heather	Brandee	Brandee	Brandee	Brandee (Samantha)	Brandee		
Steele	Vanessa	Vanessa	Kym	Erica	Erica (Heather)	Erica		
Derek	Kym	Jessica	Jess	Jess	Jess (Erica)			
Jason	Jess	Erica	Jessica	Jessica				
Adam	Brandee	Kym	Heather					
Peter	Theresa	Jess						
Jared	Dawn							

=== Women ===
Partners	1	2	3	4	5 (Mandatory Switch)	6	7	8 (Finale)
Samantha	Mike	Mike	Mike	Mike	Mike (Ben)	Mike	Mike	Mike
Heather	Ben	Miles	Adam	Miles	Miles (Steele)	Miles	Miles	Miles
Theresa	Peter	Skip	Skip	Skip	Skip (Mike)	Skip	Skip	
Brandee	Adam	Ben	Ben	Ben	Ben (Miles)	Ben		
Erica	Miles	Jason	Miles	Steele	Steele (Derek)	Steele		
Jess	Jason	Peter	Derek	Derek	Derek (Skip)			
Jessica	Skip	Derek	Jason	Jason				
Kym	Derek	Adam	Steele					
Vanessa	Steele	Steele						
Dawn	Jared							

Finished first and immune from elimination, except in episodes 5 and 7
Eliminated
Winner
Runner-up

=== Updates ===
Mike and Samantha announced their engagement in March 2013 and got married on April 19, 2014, in San Francisco, California, where they have been living together since the show ended. They have two children: daughter Audrey (born on December 29, 2015) and son Zachary (born February 1, 2018). Heather and Miles have also been residing in San Francisco. The two announced their engagement in March 2015 and were married on June 18, 2016. Their son Macklin was born in August 2018.

== Filming ==
Principal photography for the first season took place in Cahuita, Limón, La Fortuna, and San Carlos, Costa Rica. The second season's filming was split between the Dominican Republic and Hawaii.

== Season 2 (2012) ==
=== Contestants ===
Females
Contestant	Age	Hometown
Yanina Beccaria	33	Chicago, Illinois
Michelle Sacco	28	Atlanta, Georgia
Summer Mack	32	Indian Harbour Beach, Florida
Ali Leitza	33	Little Rock, Arkansas
Jenna Gillund	23	Dallas, Texas
Vanessa Ramirez	30	Phoenix, Arizona
Cina Luks	22	San Lorenzo, California
Jenny Blatt	27	Philadelphia, Pennsylvania
Lindsay Furman	29	Philadelphia, Pennsylvania
Melissa Alatorre	23	Los Angeles, California
Natalie Korzon	24	Ann Arbor, Michigan
Tara Locke	26	Miami Beach, Florida
Shauna Dillard	28	Kingsburg, California

Males
Contestant	Age	Hometown
Kenneth "Ken" Barrington	33	Miami Beach, Florida
Benjamin "Ben" Clark	27	Bolsover, United Kingdom
Aaron "Chase" Chase	28	Newport Beach, California
Jesse Wilson	33	Manhattan Beach, California
Ryan Smith	27	San Francisco, California
Jason Ewell	25	Dublin, California
Tim Parrish	32	Chicago, Illinois
Christian Seklecki	34	Atlanta, Georgia
Darwin Zook	32	Boston, Massachusetts
Franky Arriola	31	Miami, Florida
Jason Holmes	29	North Hollywood, California
Leonard "Leo" Borriello	27	Philadelphia, Pennsylvania
Mike Sweet	30	Los Angeles, California
Quaison "Q" Dodd	31	Los Angeles, California

=== Men ===
Partners	1	2	3	4	5	6	7	8 (Finale)
Ken	Yanina	Yanina	Yanina & Lindsay	Yanina	Yanina	Yanina	Yanina	Yanina
Ben	Jenny	Jenny	Jenny & Michelle	Michelle	Ali	Michelle	Michelle	Michelle
Chase	Cina	Ali	Ali & Jenna	Summer	Summer	Summer	Summer	
Jesse	Summer	Tara	Tara & Melissa	Ali	Michelle			
Ryan	Shauna	Shauna	Summer & Natalie	Jenna	Jenna			
Jason E.	Cina	Cina	Cina & Vanessa	Vanessa				
Tim	Tara	Summer						
Jason H.	Ali							
Leo	Tara							
Quaison	Summer							
Franky	Jenny							
Darwin	Ali							
Mike	Yanina							
Christian	Shauna							

=== Women ===
Partners	1	2	3	4	5	6	7	8 (Finale)
Yanina	Ken & Mike	Ken	Ken	Ken	Ken	Ken	Ken	Ken
Michelle	N/A	N/A	Ben	Ben	Jesse	Ben	Ben	Ben
Summer	Jesse & Quaison	Tim	Ryan	Chase	Chase	Chase	Chase	
Jenna	N/A	N/A	Chase	Ryan	Ryan			
Ali	Jason H. & Darwin	Chase	Chase	Jesse	Ben			
Vanessa	N/A	N/A	Jason E.	Jason E.				
Cina	Chase & Jason E.	Jason E.	Jason E.					
Jenny	Ben & Franky	Ben	Ben					
Lindsay	N/A	N/A	Ken					
Melissa	N/A	N/A	Jesse					
Natalie	N/A	N/A	Ryan					
Tara	Tim & Leo	Jesse	Jesse					
Shauna	Christian & Ryan	Ryan						

Finished first and immune from elimination, except in episodes 1,3 and 6
Eliminated
Winner
Runner-up

=== Updates ===
Winners Ken and Yanina got married in the Dominican Republic on January 17, 2015. They have two children: daughter Andi (born January 8, 2016) and son Lennox (born August 2018). Runner-ups Ben and Michelle were the first couple to get married, doing so on October 26, 2013. Summer and Chase announced their engagement September 2014. They were married on March 4, 2016. All couples remain together as of 2024.

Jesse Wilson was a contestant on Syfy's reality game show Opposite Worlds.

== Reception ==
Love in the Wild received mixed reviews from critics, with Metacritic scoring a 47 out of 100.

Emily Yahr of The Washington Post said that the best part of the show was all about the "sweeping views of Costa Rica", however, it did not go "far enough in any direction to make the premise intriguing to watch."

Love in the Wild premiered to a 2.2/6 rating in adults 18/49 and was watched by 6.48 million viewers. The premiere was the third most watched program of the night, and it was first in its timeslot. The premiere was the seventh most watched show that week.
