= Juan Hamilton Depassier =

Chilean politician (1927–2008)

Juan Hamilton
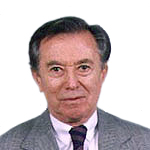

Member of the Senate
- In office 11 March 1994 – 11 March 2002
- Preceded by: Laura Soto
- Succeeded by: Nelson Ávila
- In office 15 May 1969 – 21 September 1973
- Succeeded by: Dissolution of the Congress (1973 military coup)

Minister of Mining
- In office 11 March 1990 – 11 March 1994
- President: Patricio Aylwin
- Preceded by: Jorge López Bain
- Succeeded by: Alejandro Hales

Minister of Mining
- In office 10 August 1966 – 9 October 1968
- President: Eduardo Frei Montalva
- Preceded by: Modesto Collados
- Succeeded by: Andrés Donoso

Undersecretary of the Interior
- In office 3 November 1964 – 10 October 1966
- President: Eduardo Frei Montalva
- Preceded by: Jaime Silva Silva
- Succeeded by: Enrique Krauss

President of the University of Chile Student Federation
- In office 1949–1950
- Preceded by: Jorge Luis Brazelatto
- Succeeded by: José Tohá

Personal details
- Born: 21 September 1927 Santiago, Chile
- Died: 7 September 2008 (aged 80) Santiago, Chile
- Party: National Falange; Christian Democratic Party
- Spouse(s): María Luisa Velasco (div.); Marta Atria
- Children: Four
- Education: University of Chile (LL.B)
- Profession: Lawyer

Juan Patricio José Hamilton Depassier (21 September 1927 − 7 September 2008) was a Chilean politician who served as Senator and minister of State.

He served as Senator for the 6th Senatorial Constituency, Valparaíso Region, for the 1994–2002 term, and previously for the 10th Provincial Grouping —Chiloé, Aysén and Magallanes— between 1969 and 1973.

He served as Minister of Housing and Urban Planning between 10 August 1966 and 9 October 1968, during the government of President Eduardo Frei Montalva. He later served as Minister of Mining between 11 March 1990 and 28 September 1992, under President Patricio Aylwin.

== Biography ==
=== Family and youth ===
He was born in Santiago, Chile, on 21 August 1927. He was the son of Carlos Hamilton and Rosa Depassier Varas.

He married María Luisa Velasco and, in a second marriage, Marta Atria Rawlins. He had four children.

=== Professional career ===
He completed his primary and secondary education at Saint George’s College in Santiago. He pursued higher education at the University of Chile Faculty of Law, where he obtained a degree in Legal and Social Sciences. His undergraduate thesis, titled Del objeto de la propiedad minera, was awarded the Rodolfo Castro Prize by the Faculty of Legal and Social Sciences. He qualified as a lawyer on 15 September 1950.

He practiced law in Santiago and, in 1950, served as a lawyer for Banco Sudamericano.

== Political career ==
He began his political career as a university student when he was elected delegate of the Law School to the Student Federation (FECH) in 1948. He later served as president of the Federation between 1949 and 1950. During this period, he joined the Falange Nacional, serving as president of the party’s youth organization. He later became a member of the Christian Democratic Party upon its formation.

Between 1964 and 1966, he served as Undersecretary of the Interior during the government of President Eduardo Frei Montalva. In this role, he organized the internal government service and coordinated emergency response and reconstruction efforts following the 1965 earthquake in Valparaíso and Aconcagua.

President Frei Montalva appointed him Minister of the newly created Ministry of Housing and Urban Planning, a position he held from 10 August 1966 to 9 October 1968. He also served as acting Minister of Mining between 26 May and 12 June 1967, and again between 25 May and 16 July 1968.

During the military regime of Augusto Pinochet, he devoted himself to the reconstruction of the Christian Democratic Party, which had first been declared in recess and later outlawed. In the 1980s, he served as a communal party president and ran for the party presidency in 1985, an election won by Gabriel Valdés. On multiple occasions, he served as vice president and national councilor, and during the military regime he was in charge of the party’s Department of International Relations.

In 1977, he collaborated in the founding of the magazine Hoy, and during the 1980s he served as chairman of the board of the newspaper La Época.

In the 1989 parliamentary elections, he ran for the Senate representing the Coastal Valparaíso Region for the 1990–1994 term, on behalf of the Christian Democratic Party. He obtained 112,626 votes, corresponding to 28.52% of the valid votes cast, but was not elected despite achieving the second-highest vote total.

On 11 March 1990, he assumed office as Minister of Mining in the government of President Patricio Aylwin, serving until 28 September 1992.

In 1993, he again ran for the Senate, this time for the 6th Senatorial Constituency, Valparaíso Region Coast, representing the Christian Democratic Party. He was elected with 116,515 votes, equivalent to 29.89% of the valid votes cast.

From 17 October 2004, he served as a member of the National Television Council (CNTV), remaining in office until his death.

He died in Santiago on 6 September 2008.
