= Arturo Longton (politician) =

Chilean lawyer and politician

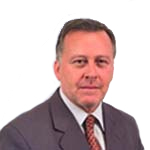

Governor of Marga Marga Province
- In office 17 March 2010 – 16 November 2012
- Succeeded by: César Molina

Member of the Chamber of Deputies
- In office 11 March 1990 – 11 March 2006
- Succeeded by: Amelia Herrera Silva
- Constituency: 12th district

Mayor of Valparaíso
- In office 1 September 1987 – 1 June 1988
- Preceded by: Francisco Bartolucci
- Succeeded by: Alejandro Navarrete Pinochet

Mayor of Quilpué
- In office 1983 – 1 September 1987
- Preceded by: Guido Olguín Ossandón
- Succeeded by: Fernando Márquez Espinoza

Personal details
- Born: 25 June 1948 Limache, Chile
- Died: 3 July 2015 (aged 67) Quilpué, Chile
- Party: National Renewal
- Spouse: Amelia Herrera Silva
- Children: Andrés Longton; Arturo Longton Herrera
- Education: Pontifical Catholic University of Valparaíso
- Profession: Lawyer

Arturo Longton Guerrero (25 June 1948 – 3 July 2015) was a Chilean lawyer and politician. He served as the first Governor of Marga Marga Province from 2010 to 2012.

Longton was born in Limache on 25 June 1948. In 1983, he was elected mayor of Quilpué until 1987, when he assumed the mayorship of Valparaíso. He served in this capacity for one year. Representing the National Renewal, Longton was a deputy of the Chamber of Deputies of Chile for the 12th district between 1990 and 2006. In 2010, he was appointed by President Sebastián Piñera as the first governor of Marga Marga Province, a position he held until 16 November 2012.

On 3 July 2015, Longton was found dead in his apartment in Quilpué, Chile, at the age of 67. The suspected cause of death was cardiac arrest. He is survived by his wife Amelia Herrera, who is also a politician; sons Arturo and Andrés Longton; and daughter Amelia Longton.

== Early life and family ==
Longton was born in Limache on 25 June 1948. He is the son of Arturo Conrado Longton Rolke and María Nora Guerrero Mutinelli.

He was married to Amelia Herrera, with whom he had three children: Amelia, Arturo, and Andrés Longton, who served as a parliamentary for the Valparaíso Region.

== Professional career ==
He completed his primary education at the Colegio Salesiano de Valparaíso and his secondary education at Liceo Nº 2 de Recreo in Viña del Mar.

After finishing school, he began studying History at the Pontifical Catholic University of Valparaíso but left after one year to pursue Law at the same institution. He completed his law degree at the University of Chile and obtained his attorney qualification on 15 April 1981. He later earned a doctorate in Historical Law from the Complutense University of Madrid.

He began his professional career as a legal procurator in Santiago and served as Investigating Prosecutor for the Agrarian Reform Corporation (CORA). Between 1981 and 1983, he was secretary-lawyer for the Administration and Finance Department of the Municipality of Valparaíso during the mayoralty of Francisco Bartolucci.

== Political career ==
In 1983, he was appointed mayor of Quilpué, serving until 1987. That year he was appointed mayor of Valparaíso, holding office until 1988.

He joined National Renewal (RN) in 1988.

In the November 2013 parliamentary elections, he ran as a candidate for the Chamber of Deputies representing District 12 in the Valparaíso Region for National Renewal, but was not elected.
