= Nelson Tapia =

Chilean footballer and manager (born 1966)

Personal information
- Full name: Nelson Antonio Tapia Ríos
- Date of birth: 22 September 1966 (age 60)
- Place of birth: Molina, Chile
- Height: 1.82 m (5 ft 11 1/2 in)
- Position: Goalkeeper

Youth career
- 1984–1987: O'Higgins

Senior career*
Years	Team	Apps	(Gls)
1987–1992	O'Higgins	100	(0)
1993–2000	Universidad Católica	183	(0)
1993	→ Deportes Temuco (loan)	17	(0)
2000–2001	Vélez Sársfield	3	(0)
2001	Deportes Puerto Montt	7	(0)
2002	Unión Española	21	(0)
2003	Cobreloa	35	(0)
2004	Santos	18	(0)
2005	Cobreloa	7	(0)
2005	Junior	12	(0)
Total		403	(0)

International career
2000	Chile Olympic (O.P.)	6	(0)
1994–2005	Chile	73	(0)

Managerial career
- 2015: Chile U17 (gk coach)
- 2016: Independiente Cauquenes
- 2018: Cobreloa (assistant)
- 2019: Barcelona SC (gk coach)
- 2019: Barcelona SC (interim)
- 2020–2021: Guayaquil Sport
- 2021–2022: Libertad FC
- 2022–2023: Aampetra
- 2023: Olmedo
- 2024: Audax Italiano (assistant)
- 2024: Audax Italiano (interim)
- 2025: Rangers (gk coach)
- 2025–2026: Constitución Unido
- 2026: Imperial Unido
Medal record
Representing Chile
Men's Football
Bronze medal – third place	2000 Sydney	Team competition
- * Club domestic league appearances and goals

Nelson Antonio Tapia Ríos (born 22 September 1966) is a former Chilean football goalkeeper and current football manager.

== International career ==
He made his debut for the Chile national team in 1994 against France. After his last match thus far, a 0–5 loss against Brazil in 2005, the tally is at 73 caps. He played all four games for Chile at the 1998 FIFA World Cup, and he also won an Olympic bronze medal with Chile at the 2000 Summer Olympics.

== Managerial career ==
While he was studying at the INAF (National Football Institute) to become a football manager, he worked as a goalkeeping coach of C.D. Universidad Católica at under-10 level and as the coach of the Molina football team, in his birthplace. In addition to this, he worked as coach at school and university level and as the Technical Director of both Unión Temuco and Colchagua. In 2015, he worked as a goalkeeping coach of Chile U17 and next he became the manager of Independiente de Cauquenes in the third category of the Chilean football.

After a time as an assistant coach in Cobreloa, in 2019 he moved to Ecuador and joined Barcelona S.C. as a goalkeeping coach. Next he joined Guayaquil Sport as manager, winning the 2020 Segunda Categoría. In 2021 season, he won again the same title along with Libertad FC Tapia was sacked by Libertad on 22 September 2022.

In December 2022, he signed with Aampetra in the Ecuadorian third division. In February 2023, he switched to Olmedo in the Serie B.

In 2024, Tapia returned to Chile and joined the technical staff of Audax Italiano, serving as assistant coach of Walter Erviti. After Erviti quit having led the team for four matches, Tapia assumed as interim coach.

In 2025, Tapia assumed as the goalkeeping coach for Rangers de Talca. On 22 July of the same year, he was appointed as the manager of Constitución Unido in the Chilean Tercera A and left them in June 2026.

In July 2026, Tapia took in charge Imperial Unido.

== Personal life ==
He is nicknamed Simpson because during his career he wore a hair style similar to cartoon character Bart Simpson.

In 2012, Tapia took part in the Chilean reality show Mundos Opuestos.

On 7 August 2026, Tapia suffered a serious car accident on Route 5, Retiro commune, allegedly by drunk driving. He had another accident under a similar situation in 2010.

== Honours ==
=== Player ===
Universidad Católica

- Copa Interamericana: 1994 Copa Interamericana
- Copa Chile: 1995 Copa Chile
- Primera División de Chile: 1997 Apertura

Cobreloa

- Primera División de Chile: 2003 Apertura, 2003 Clausura

Santos

- Serie A: 2004

Chile

- Olympic Games: (bronze) in Sydney 2000

=== Manager ===
Guayaquil Sport

- Segunda Categoría: 2020

Libertad

- Segunda Categoría: 2021
