= Alejandra Chellew =

Chilean artistic businesswoman

- Occupation: Businesswoman
- Known for: Selected among the 50 most important leaders in the country in 2005

Alejandra Chellew is a Chilean artistic businesswoman. One of the most important female leaders in the country, being selected among the 50 most important leaders in the country in 2005. She is a co founder of La Sala gallery, investing a lot of effort and resources supporting Chilean young talents.
