= Edmundo Searle =

Chilean cartoonist (1893–1982)

Edmundo "Mundo" Searle
- Born: March 15, 1893; Valparaíso, Chile
- Died: May 20, 1982 (aged 89)
- Occupations: Cartoonist, Draftsman, Painter
- Known for: Society and turf cartoons
- Spouse: Esperanza Artaza
- Children: Edmundo, Perla
- Parents: Juan Grosvenor Searle Bunster (father); Elvira Mercedes Lorca Muñoz (mother)

Edmundo "Mundo" Searle (March 15, 1893 – May 20, 1982) was a Chilean cartoonist who specialized in society and turf cartoons.

Searle was born in Valparaíso, and studied at the San Luis English School of Limache and at the Colegio de los Sagrados Corazones of Valparaíso, where he graduated in 1908. He started his career as cartoonist in 1909, working for the Sucesos magazine and the newspaper La Unión de Valparaíso. From early on he signed his work as "Mundo". He married Esperanza Artaza, and had two children: Edmundo and Perla. In 1917 he emigrated to the US, where he worked for the New York Herald, but soon returned to Chile in 1918.

Between 1928 and 1931 Searle moved with his family to London, where he worked for The Bystander, Daily Sketch, Illustrated London News and Tatler. He was an ardent turfman and a frequent visitor to Ascot, Epsom and Windsor, becoming a close friend of Edward VIII, then Prince of Wales.

After his return to Chile, he concentrated principally on turf matters. The first retrospective of his work was held in August 1976, at the central hall of the Catholic University of Chile. Searle died in Santiago in 1982 at the age of 89.
