= Mundos Opuestos (Colombian TV series) =

- Country of origin: Colombia
- Original language: Spanish

Original release
- Network: RCN TV
- Release: October 7, 2012

Related
- Mundos Opuestos (Chile)

Mundos Opuestos is a Colombian reality show that is produced and broadcast by RCN TV. It is based on the Chilean hit show of the same

Eighteen participants, live and compete together, but are separated in two different worlds. Some will have the comfort and technology of the future life, while others will have to live like their ancestors did 100 years ago, all for the prize of $400 million Colombian pesos, about $200,000 US dollars.

The premise of the competition is that participants are divided into two groups, one living "the life of the future" and other "past life". The two worlds present in the house are separated by a glass wall, allowing both groups to observe the actions of the other, the direct interaction between the two groups of participants is given in the courtyard, known as "the present." Participants of the two existing groups compete each week in various physical tests to determine which group will live in the past and which in the future and determine the participant to be eliminated from the competition.

== Rules ==
- "Protected for all time" is the only participant who has immunity, and does not run the risk of being eliminated or nominated, you can move freely throughout the past, present and future, but cannot deliver goods to both the future participants of the past, and past participants of the future. It has the blue suit to differentiate it from the other participants, and is the only one who decides who will be the nominee of the council of past and future in case there is a tie.
- "Punished for all time": The participant was the fewest votes from the public via text messages, becoming the nominee extra.
- "This": The place where all participants can move, but no participant may circulate in the present before 10:00 am nor after midnight.
- "Secret room": It is located in the world of the future and delivers additional conveniences and surprises the competitors of the winning team and those who have beaten the "Wellness Challenge" of the week. Also, the room allows this couple can communicate via video with a family member or close.

== Contestants, teams and ranking ==
Contestant	Original team	Merged team	Finish
Isabel Cristina Gómez; 23, Dental student	Infinito		1st Eliminated
Giorgio Difeo; 32, actor	Infinito		2nd Eliminated
Julieth Pinto; 22, footballer	Eternidad		3rd Eliminated
Hernando Colmenares; 49, personal trainer	Infinito		4th Eliminated
Sandra Muñoz; 34, actress & model	Infinito		5th Eliminated
Eduardo José Beleño; 25, singer	Eternidad		6th Eliminated
Víctor Aristizábal; 41, footballer	Eternidad	Individuales	7th Eliminated
Omar Murillo; 31, actor & media personality	Infinito	Individuales	8th Eliminated
Diana Caicedo; 25, model & Journalism student	Eternidad	Individuales	9th Eliminated
Ana María Córdoba; 26, model	Infinito	Individuales	10th Eliminated
Delmis Muñoz; 28, model, former Miss Playboy	Infinito	Individuales	11th Eliminated
Farina; 26, singer-songwriter & rapper	Infinito	Individuales	12th Eliminated
Edward Carrillo; 27, unemployed	Infinito	Individuales	13th Eliminated
Víctor Javier Torres; 29, gas station attendant	Infinito	Individuales	14th Eliminated
Abdu César; 39, engineer	Eternidad	Individuales	Semifinalists eliminated
Julián Rendón; 28, journalist	Eternidad	Individuales	Semifinalists eliminated
Daniela "Nanis" Ochoa; 23, model	Infinito	Individuales	Semifinalists eliminated
Ana Lucía Silva; 29, actress	Eternidad	Individuales	Semifinalists eliminated
Paola Tovar; 25, actress	Eternidad	Individuales	Runner-up
Pipe Calderón; 29, singer	Eternidad	Individuales	Runner-up
Sofía Jaramillo; 23, model & Social Comm. student	Eternidad	Individuales	Winner
Wesley Burger; 34, adventurer & safari guide	Eternidad	Individuales	Winner
