= Mundos Opuestos (Chilean TV series) =

- Created by: Sergio Nakasone
- Presented by: Sergio Lagos; Karla Constant
- Country of origin: Chile
- Original language: Spanish
- No. of seasons: 3

Production
- Executive producer: Juan Pablo Planas (S1-2)
- Production company: Canal 13

Original release
- Network: Canal 13
- Release: 15 January – 27 June 2012

Mundos Opuestos is a Chilean reality show produced and broadcast on Canal 13. 22 participants (10 famous and 12 unknown) initially entered production, being isolated in a house in Pirque, southeast of Santiago de Chile. The premise of the competition is that participants will be divided into two groups, one about living "the life of the future" and the other about living "the life of the past". The two worlds present in the house were separated by a glass wall, allowing both groups to observe the actions of the other, the direct interaction between the two groups of participants is given in the courtyard, known as "the present". Participants of the two existing groups compete each week in various physical tests to determine which group will live in the past, and which will live in the future and to determine which participant will be eliminated from the competition.

The winners of the first version of Mundos Opuestos were Sebastian Roca and Viviana Flores. The reality show premiered on 15 January 2012 at 11:00 pm and the grand final was on 27 June 2012 at 10:30 pm. This show was a total success in Chile, being watched by 2.9 million viewers per episode, with the second season premiered on 13 January 2013. The third season premiered on June, 2025.

== Season 1 ==
Contestant	Original teams	New Teams	Merged team	Finish
Tamara Sepúlveda; 22, model	Infinito			1st Eliminated
Daniela Muñoz; 20, Football player	Eternidad			2nd Eliminated
Fernando Poblete; 31, Educational assistant	Infinito			3rd Eliminated
Ivana Simunovic; 19, Commercial engineer student	Eternidad			Quit
Tony Kamo; 46, Mentalist	Eternidad			Quit
Camila Nash; 25, Calle 7 contestant	Eternidad			4th Eliminated
Francisco Huaiquipán; 33, Football player	Eternidad			Quit
Nicole "Luli" Moreno; 24, model	Infinito			Quit
Marcelo Marocchino; 23, model	Eternidad			5th Eliminated
Michelle Carvalho; 18, model	Eternidad			Quit
Romina Reyes; 27, Stylist	Eternidad			6th Eliminated
Francisco "Murci" Rojas; 37, Football player	Eternidad	Chronos		7th Eliminated
Yamna Lobos; 29, Dancer	Infinito	Chronos		8th Eliminated
Mario "Chapu" Moreno; 37, Member of the Marea Roja	Eternidad	Eternia		9th Eliminated
Camila Nash; 25, Calle 7 contestant	Eternidad	Chronos		10th Eliminated
Francisco "Murci" Rojas; 37, Football player	Eternidad	Chronos		11th Eliminated
Wilma González; 27, model	Infinito	Eternia		12th Eliminated
Nelson Tapia; 45, Football player	None	Chronos		13th Eliminated
Paz Gómez; 23, Calle 7 contestant	None	Eternia		14th Eliminated
Juan "Chispa" Lacassie; 23, Skater	Infinito	Eternia		Quit
Yamna Lobos; 29, Dancer	Infinito	Chronos	Individuales	15th Eliminated
Thiago Cunha; 30, Dancer	Eternidad	Eternia	Individuales	16th Eliminated
Mariana Marino; 31, model	Infinito	Eternia	Individuales	17th Eliminated
Agustín Pastorino; 30, model	None	Eternia	Individuales	18th Eliminated
Dominique Gallego; 22, model	Eternidad	Chronos	Individuales	19th Eliminated
Angélica Sepúlveda; 31, 1810 contestant	None	Chronos	Individuales	20th Eliminated
José Luis "Joshe" Bibbó; 27, model	Infinito	Chronos	Individuales	21st Eliminated
Andrés Longton; 29, Brother of Arturo Longton, lawyer	Infinito	Chronos	Individuales	22nd Eliminated
Stephanie "Fanny" Cuevas; 19, Peddler	Infinito	Chronos	Individuales	Runner-up
David Dubó; 25, Karateka	Infinito	Eternia	Individuales	Runner-up
Viviana Flores; 20, Justin Bieber Impressionist	Infinito	Eternia	Individuales	Winner
Sebastián Roca; 30, Student	Eternidad	Chronos	Individuales	Winner

== Season 2 ==
Contestant	Original team	New Team	Merged team	Finish
Carolina Nicolich; 20, Gipsy	Olimpo			1st Eliminated
Branislav Tepes; 26, Great-grandson of Vlad the Impaler	Nirvana			2nd Eliminated
Claudia Schmidt; 38, model	Nirvana			Removed
Tamara Primus; 26, Calle 7 contestant	Olimpo			Quit
Sofía Jaramillo; 23, Winner of Mundos Opuestos: Colombia	Nirvana			Quit
Juan "Yoan Amor" Briones; 24, Singer	Olimpo			3rd Eliminated
Alejandra Díaz; 30, model	Olimpo			4th Eliminated
Rosa Barros; 21, Stallholder	Nirvana			Quit
Juana María "Yendy" Rodríguez; 23, Housekeeper of Los Mendez	Olimpo			5th Eliminated
Juan "Chispa" Lacassie; 24, Skater	None			Removed
Mauricio Israel; 51, presenter	Nirvana			6th Eliminated
María Auxiliadora "Mariuxi" Domínguez; 30, Yingo contestant	Olimpo			7th Eliminated
Diego Pérez; 33, Audiovisual communicator	Nirvana			Quit
Jonathan Morales; 24, Electrician	Nirvana			8th Eliminated
Mariela Montero; 32, model	Olimpo			9th Eliminated
Damián Bodenhöfer; 29, Son of Bastián Bodenhöfer	Nirvana			10th Eliminated
Nadia Barrientos; 27, model	Nirvana			11th Eliminated
Jorge Olivares; 30, Protagonistas de la Fama contestant	Nirvana			12th Eliminated
Carla Pinto; 29, Daughter of Carlos Pinto	Nirvana	Gigantes		13th Eliminated
Diego Pérez; 33, Audiovisual communicator	Nirvana	Gigantes		14th Eliminated
Angélica Jaramillo; 27, model	Nirvana	Titanes		15th Eliminated
Cristián Labbé Jr. 33, Son of Cristián Labbé	Olimpo	Gigantes		16th Eliminated
Valentina Roth; 21, model	None	Gigantes		Quit
Valentín Benet; 25, model	Nirvana	Titanes		17th Eliminated
Pilar Bezanilla; 19, Student	Nirvana	Gigantes	Individuales	18th Eliminated
Mario Ortega; 28, Amor Ciego 2 winner	None	Titanes	Individuales	19th Eliminated
Mariela Montero; 32, model	Olimpo	Gigantes	Individuales	20th Eliminated
Sebastián Ramírez; 26, Pareja Perfecta contestant	Nirvana	Gigantes	Individuales	21st Eliminated
Simone Mardones; 21, CQC, Chile cast	Nirvana	Titanes	Individuales	22nd Eliminated
Juan Pablo Úbeda; 32, Football player	Olimpo	Titanes	Individuales	23rd Eliminated
Michelle Carvalho; 21, model	None	Titanes	Individuales	24th Eliminated
Richard Rubin; 30, TV personality	Olimpo	Titanes	Individuales	25th Eliminated
Katherina Contreras; 23, Calle 7 contestant	Olimpo	Titanes	Individuales	26th Eliminated
Melina Figueroa; 22, model	Olimpo	Titanes	Individuales	27th Eliminated
Arturo Longton; 34, La Granja contestant	Nirvana	Titanes	Individuales	28th Eliminated
Rubén Hilcker; 22, Student	Olimpo	Gigantes	Individuales	29th Eliminated
Rocío Marengo; 33, model	Nirvana	Gigantes	Individuales	Runner-up
Andrés Longton; 30, Brother of Arturo Longton	Olimpo	Titanes	Individuales	Runner-up
Stephanie "Fanny" Cuevas; 20, Mundos Opuestos 1 contestant	Olimpo	Gigantes	Individuales	Winner
Artur Logunov; 23, actor	Olimpo	Gigantes	Individuales	Winner

== Mundos Opuestos around the World ==
Country	Name / Official Website	Channel	Winners
Chile	Mundos opuestos Official website	Canal 13	First edition, 2012: Viviana Flores and Sebastián Roca; Second edition, 2013: Stephanie Cuevas and Artur Logunov
Colombia	Mundos Opuestos (Colombia)	RCN -Official website	First edition, 2012: Sofia Jaramillo and Wesley Burger
Croatia	TBA -	Nova TV	First edition, 2014: Coming Soon
Mexico	Mundos Opuestos -	TV Azteca	First edition, 2015: Coming Soon
Paraguay	Mundos opuestos (programa de televisión paraguayo)	RPC Canal 13	First edition, 2017: Nicolás Neumann and Liliana Cornet
Turkey	TBA -	ATV Avrupa	First edition, 2014: Coming Soon
United States	Opposite Worlds -	SyFy	First edition, 2014: Frank Sansonetti

== Rules ==
There is a contestant who is "protected for the times". They are the only participant who has immunity, and not at risk of being eliminated. They can move freely between the past, present and future; but cannot deliver goods from the future to the past or vice versa. They have a blue suit to differentiate her from other participants. In case of a tie, they are the sole decider of the nominee to the council of past and future.

"Punished for the times": The participant with the fewest votes via public text message, who becomes nominated for elimination.

"The Present": A place where all participants can visit. However, no participant may circulate in the present between midnight and 10:00 am.

"Secret room": Located in the future and delivers additional amenities and surprises. Available to the couple of competitors from the winning team who has won the "Wellness Challenge" of the week. Also the room allows couples to communicate with family members or close friends via video.
