= Opposite Worlds =

Reality television show

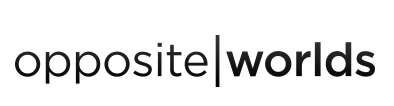
- Genre: Reality competition
- Created by: Sergio Nakasone
- Directed by: Hans van Riet
- Presented by: Luke Tipple
- Countries of origin: United States; Chile (Franchise)
- Original language: English
- No. of seasons: 1
- No. of episodes: 12

Production
- Executive producer: Curtis Colden
- Running time: 43 minutes

Original release
- Network: Syfy
- Release: January 21 – February 26, 2014

Related
- Mundos Opuestos

Opposite Worlds is an American reality game show that originally aired on the cable channel Syfy. The format of the show was based on the successful Chilean series Mundos Opuestos which aired from 2012 to 2013 on the national free-to-air channel Canal 13. The series revolved around a group of strangers divided into two teams, and made to live in a house divided by "future" and "past" themes. The teams competed in weekly challenges to determine where they would live. One contestant, known as the Decider, selected two contestants to compete in a challenge, with the loser being eliminated from the game. The winner of the series, determined after six weeks, won a $100,000 prize. The series was hosted by Luke Tipple. The show premiered on January 21, 2014 and aired on Tuesdays and Wednesdays, with the latter being a live elimination episode. The show was cancelled after one season.

== History ==
The Chilean series Mundos Opuestos first premiered in January 2012, and featured a total of thirty-two contestants who were both celebrities and non-celebrities, including Richard Rubin of Beauty and the Geek. The series proved to be an early success, and editions for Turkey, Mexico, and the United States were later announced to be in the works. The series was first announced in October 2013, and was slated for a January 2014 release. The series officially launched on January 21, 2014. In a Tweet dated March 1, 2015, the host, Luke Tipple, confirmed the show was canceled.

== Format ==
Opposite Worlds is a game show in which a group of contestants live in isolation from the outside world in a custom built "house", constantly under video surveillance. The house is divided by a "future" (luxurious Space Age) and "past" (primitive Stone Age) theme, with a glass wall dividing the two areas. The contestants are divided into two teams, and participate in a weekly "Worldly Challenge" to determine which area the teams will stay; the winning team is given the option to live in the future or the past. The two teams later select one of their own to be "protected" for the week, and thus are not able to be eliminated that week. Viewers then vote for one of the two protected contestants to become the "Decider", who then select one player from each team to face off in "The Duel of Destiny". The loser of the duel is eliminated from the competition. Though the show is hosted by Luke Tipple, the house also features an electronic voice, Athena, who communicates with those in the "future" area of the house.

While the series was airing, it featured a "Twitter Popularity Index" (TPI), which was used to determine the popularity of each contestant; the most popular contestant received a reward, while the least popular received a punishment.

== Season details ==
Season	Launch date	Finale date	Days	Contestants	Winner	Prize money	Average viewers (millions)	Episodes
Season 1	January 21, 2014	February 26, 2014	42	14	Frank Sansonetti	$100,000	TBA	12

== Development ==
In October 2012, it was confirmed that SyFy had picked up the rights to air the series for twelve episodes for a total of six weeks. Mark Stern, president of content over SyFy, said the series "has become an absolute phenomenon [...] This groundbreaking, edgy program is a remarkable television experiment transporting the audience and the contestants into starkly opposite worlds, simultaneously." The series was executive produced by J. D. Roth, Todd A. Nelson, Brant Pinvidic, Adam Kaloustian and Curtis Colden for Eyeworks USA. Casting for the series was done both online and through casting calls, with applicants being able to submit videos to SyFy or to appear at a casting call. It was noted that eight out of the original twelve contestants were from California, while three of the potential four contestants were from California as well. Wyatt, JR, Frank, and Charles were the only contestants who submitted their applications online.

It was announced on January 9, 2014 that Luke Tipple would host the series. Tipple had previously been on television series' for networks such as The CW and the Discovery Channel. The contestants entered the house on January 16, 2014. The cast was revealed on January 14, 2014. Rachel Lara is a working actress and starred in Lionsgate's thriller movie, 'Killer Holiday', and had previously been a character model for Capcom's' Resident Evil: Operation Raccoon City video game. Jesse Wilson had previously appeared on the reality series Love in the Wild (2012). Aside from the original twelve contestants, an additional four contestants were revealed to be potential contestants, with the public deciding which two should enter the game. The two contestants selected entered the house at a later date.

Opposite Worlds originally aired on Tuesdays and Wednesdays on the Syfy network. The Wednesday episode of the series was announced to be live, making it the first Syfy series to air live episodes. The show was simulcasted in Canada on Bell Media's Space channel. In addition they hold the rights to produce a local edition of the show.

== Contestants ==
Contestant	Original team	Switched team	Merged team	Finish
Charles Haskins; 39, New York City, NY	Epoch			14th Place; Day 5
Rachel Lara; 27, Sherman Oaks, CA	Chronos			13th Place; Day 7
Wyatt Werneth; 47, Cocoa Beach, FL	Epoch			12th Place; Day 14
Angela Lima; 34, Minneapolis, MN	Epoch			11th Place; Day 21
Danielle Pascente; 25, Phoenix, AZ	Chronos	Chronos		10th Place; Day 28
Steve DiCarlo; 24, Burnt Hills, NY	Epoch	Epoch		9th Place; Day 29
Mercy Ukpolo; 25, Rancho Cucamonga, CA	Chronos	Chronos		7th/8th Place; Day 35
Jesse Wilson; 34, Knights Ferry, CA	Chronos	Chronos		7th/8th Place; Day 35
Lisette Resille; 32, Tucson, AZ	Chronos	Chronos	Individuals	5th/6th Place; Day 36
Lauren Schwab; 27, Valley Center, KS	Epoch	Epoch	Individuals	5th/6th Place; Day 36
Samm Murphy; 28, Jacksonville, FL	Epoch	Epoch	Individuals	4th Place; Day 42
Jeffry Calle; 25, Suffern, NY	Chronos	Chronos	Individuals	3rd Place; Day 42
J.R. Cook; 28, Knoxville, TN	Epoch	Epoch	Individuals	2nd Place; Day 42
Frank Sansonetti; 33, Staten Island, NY	Chronos	Epoch	Individuals	Winner; Day 42

=== Potential candidates ===
Four of the potential cast members were revealed for a public vote prior to the start of the season. The two players with the most votes moved into the house in time for the January 21 taped episode. The poll was won by Mercy and Steve.

Name	Age	Hometown
Kevin	38	Monroe, NY
Mercy	25	Rancho Cucamonga, CA
Natela	30	Sochi, Russia
Steve	24	Burnt Hills, NY

== Summary ==
On Day 1, the original twelve players entered the house in two groups; Danielle, Frank, Jeffry, Jesse, Lisette, and Rachel formed the Chronos team, and lived in the future area while Angela, Charles, JR, Lauren, Samm, and Wyatt formed the Epoch team in the past area. The following day, the contestants competed in the first Worldly Challenge, which saw the contestants facing off on a platform attempting to knock one another off using stun guns. During the competition, Charles broke his leg and Lauren broke her finger and sprained her wrist. Though Lauren returned to the game that night, Charles remained outside of the house. Chronos won the competition after it came down to a tie-breaker round, and chose to remain in the future area. On Day 3, Lisette and JR were chosen to be the two protected contestants. On Day 7, It was revealed J.R. won The Decider with 90% of the vote. J.R. decided to put in Angela and Rachel in The Duel in which Angela won.

== Game history ==
	Week 1	Week 2	Week 3	Week 4	Week 5		Week 6	Final	
Worldly Challenge Winners	Chronos	Chronos	Chronos	Epoch	Chronos		Frank; JR	JR	none
Protected	Lisette	Frank	Danielle	Jesse	Jeffry		none	Frank	none
Protected	JR	Lauren	Samm	JR	Lauren		none	Frank	none
The Decider	JR	Lauren	Samm	JR	none	Lauren	Frank; JR	none	none
Duel Nominees	Rachel	Jesse	Frank	Danielle	none	Jesse	none	none	none
Duel Nominees	Rachel	Jesse	Frank	Danielle	none	Mercy	none	none	none
Duel Nominees	Angela	Wyatt	Angela	Steve	none	Frank	none	none	none
Duel Nominees	Angela	Wyatt	Angela	Steve	none	Samm	none	none	none
Frank	Safe	Protected (7%)	Nominated	Safe	Safe	Nominated	Co-Decider	Protected	Winner
JR	The Decider (>90%)	Safe	Safe	The Decider (>93%)	Safe	Safe	Co-Decider	Won Quiz	Runner Up
Jeffry	Safe	Safe	Safe	Safe	Protected (>14%)		Chosen	Lost Quiz	Eliminated (Day 42)
Samm	Safe	Safe	The Decider (86%)	Safe	Safe	Nominated	Chosen	Lost Quiz	Eliminated (Day 42)
Lauren	Safe	The Decider (93%)	Safe	Safe	Protected	The Decider (<86%)	Not Chosen ^{4}	Eliminated (Day 36)	
Lisette	Protected (<10%)	Safe	Safe	Safe	Safe	Safe	Not Chosen ^{4}	Eliminated (Day 36)	
Jesse	Safe	Nominated	Safe	Protected (<7%)	Safe	Nominated	Eliminated (Day 35)		
Mercy	Not in House	Safe	Safe	Safe	Safe	Nominated	Eliminated (Day 35)		
Steve	Not in House	Safe	Safe	Nominated	Voted Out ^{3}	Eliminated (Day 29)			
Danielle	Safe	Safe	Protected (14%)	Nominated	Eliminated (Day 28)				
Angela	Nominated	Safe	Nominated	Eliminated (Day 21)					
Wyatt	Safe	Nominated	Eliminated (Day 14)						
Rachel	Nominated	Eliminated (Day 7)							
Charles	Evacuated (Day 5)								
Rewarded	none	JR	Lauren	Jesse	Lauren		Lauren	none	
Punished	none	Jeffry	Jesse	Jeffry	Jeffry		Lisette	none	

=== Notes ===
- Represents Team Chronos
- Represents Team Epoch
- ^Note 3 After losing the challenge Team Epoch had to vote someone off. They voted off Steve.
- ^Note 4 After winning the challenge, each of the two winners pick another to continue as well, effectively removing the two unpicked players.

== Reception ==
Writing on ChicagoNow, NaShantá Fletcher called the show "freakishly addicting." Tyler Stevenson, in his book Reality Television: Guilty Pleasure or Positive Influence?, compares Opposite Worlds to Survivor, the latter of which rigorously tests its games to ensure that they are safe for competitors.
