= Amelia Herrera =

Chilean politician

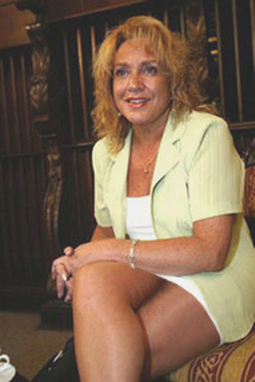

Member of the Chamber of Deputies
- In office 11 March 2006 – 11 March 2010
- Preceded by: Arturo Longton
- Succeeded by: Arturo Squella
- Constituency: 12th district

Mayor of Quilpué
- In office 6 December 1996 – 6 December 2004
- Preceded by: Iván Manríquez
- Succeeded by: Mauricio Viñambres

Personal details
- Born: Chile
- Party: National Renewal
- Spouse: Arturo Longton (died 2015)
- Children: 3
- Education: University of Chile
- Profession: Lawyer

Maria Amelia Herrera Silva is a Chilean politician. She served as deputy for the 12th district and previously was mayor of Quilpué from 1996 to 2004.

In 2015, her husband Arturo Longton died. They had sons Arturo and Andrés Longton; and a daughter Amelia Longton.

== Biography ==
Herrera was born on 25 August 1950, daughter of Luis Herrera Carvajal and Julia Silvia Muñoz. She was married to Arturo Longton Guerrero, who served as mayor of Quilpué (1983–1987) and Valparaíso (1987–1988), and as a deputy for the 12th District in the periods 1990–1994, 1994–1998, 1998–2002 and 2002–2006. She is the mother of three children, including National Renewal (RN) deputy Andrés Longton Herrera.

She attended primary school at Colegio Nuestra Señora de la Concepción in Caracas, Venezuela, and secondary school at Colegio Compañía de María in Santiago. She then enrolled at the University of Chile, where she earned a law degree in 1975. In 1978, she validated her studies at the Complutense University of Madrid, Spain. Between 1975 and 1982, she resided in that country.

== Political career ==
After returning to Chile, between 1989 and 1993 she was campaign manager for deputy Arturo Longton in the Fifth Region. From 1992 to 1996, she served as a councillor of the commune of Quilpué. She was elected mayor of the same municipality in 1996 and re-elected for the 2000–2004 term. Between 1994 and 2004, she was a member of the Executive Committee of the Chilean Association of Municipalities at both regional and national levels.

As a member of the National Renewal (RN) party, she served on the National Council and as president of the 12th District from 1996 to 2005. From 2004 to 2005, she sat on the Political Commission and was vice president of the Municipal Sector.

In 2003, she represented Chilean municipalities at the Barcelona Congress, presenting on women and local governance and the deficits of competence and financing that hinder effective city development.

In the parliamentary elections of 11 December 2005, she was elected as a deputy representing National Renewal for the 12th District in the Valparaíso Region, obtaining 33,184 votes (28.69%).

In the December 2009 elections, she sought re-election for the same district but, after a close vote count initially leaving her out of the Chamber of Deputies and a review by the Electoral Qualification Tribunal (Tricel), her defeat by 16 votes was confirmed.

In the elections held on 19 November 2017, she ran for a seat on the Regional Council of the Valparaíso Region representing the Province of Marga Marga and was elected with the highest vote count, with 18,253 votes (15.27% of the total votes).
