= Banco del Estado de Chile =

Chilean public bank

Banco del Estado de Chile (BancoEstado)

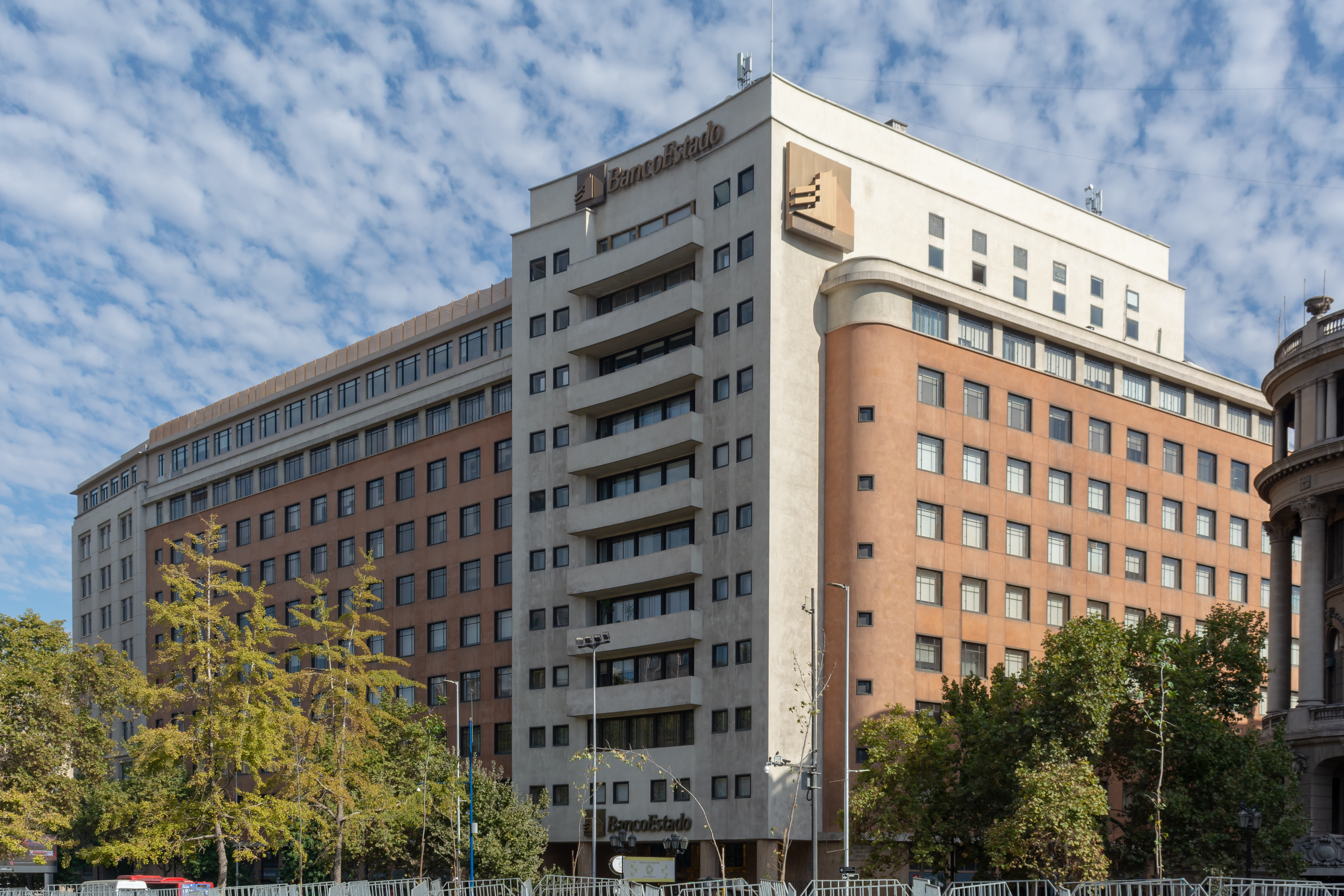
- Headquarters in Santiago, Chile
- Type: Public bank
- Industry: Financial services
- Predecessors: Caja Nacional de Ahorros Caja de Crédito Hipotecario Caja de Crédito Agrario Instituto de Crédito Industrial
- Founded: 1855; 171 years ago (as Caja Nacional de Ahorros); 1953; 73 years ago (as Banco del Estado de Chile)
- Headquarters: Av. Libertador Bernardo O'Higgins nº 1111, Santiago, Chile
- Area served: Chile, United States
- Key people: Mario Farren Risopatrón (President); Paulina Yazigi Salamanca (Vice President); Andrea Silva Da Bove (General manager)
- Products: Asset management, consumer banking, corporate banking, credit cards, investment banking, mortgage loans, private banking, wealth management
- Website: www.bancoestado.cl

Banco del Estado de Chile (lit. 'Bank of the State of Chile'), commercially operating under the brand BancoEstado, is the sole public bank in Chile and was created by government decree in 1953. It provides financial services to consumers and companies, with a focus on national coverage in terms of geography and social sectors and a particular emphasis on the unbanked and small and medium enterprises, although it serves all types of businesses. It is the country's largest mortgage lender and largest issuer of debit cards. In addition, BancoEstado performs part of the Chilean government's financial activities through the accounts managed by the General Treasury of the Republic of Chile.

The bank was created by Decree no. 126 of 1953, which merged the National Savings Bank (Caja Nacional de Ahorros), Mortgage Credit Savings Bank (Caja de Crédito Hipotecario), Agrarian Credit Savings Bank (Caja de Crédito Agrario) and Industrial Credit Institution (Instituto de Crédito Industrial) into a single institution.

By the end of 2009, BancoEstado was the third-largest bank in Chile, covering all areas of the country via branches or delegate banking contact points called CajaVecina (Spanish trade name roughly translatable as 'Neighbourhood Savings Bank'). As of 2018, the bank had 417 branches (including the New York office), 107 smaller offices (ServiEstado), 3,701 automated services (ATMs, dispensers and letter boxes) and 25,400 CajaVecina contact points. It is the only bank with presence in all the communes in the country (even in the Antarctic), reaching geographically isolated areas where no other bank is present. Until 2018, the bank reached 134 localities that had no other banking services Since 2012, Global Finance magazine has ranked BancoEstado as the safest Bank in Latin America, while in 2015 it was ranked as the 48th-safest bank in the world (6th-safest in the Southern Hemisphere).

== Legal framework ==
BancoEstado is regulated mainly by the provisions of the Organic Law of the Bank of the State of Chile (Ley Orgánica del Banco del Estado de Chile), which defines the bank as an autonomous state-owned company with separate legal personality and its own assets, supervised exclusively by the Bank and Financial Institution Board (Superintendencia de Bancos e Instituciones Financieras). The bank deals with the Government through the Ministry of Finance.

As a banking institution, BancoEstado is subject to the laws applicable to banks generally as well as those regulating the private sector as a whole, and thus is not governed by general laws and regulations aimed at the public sector.

In 2005, BancoEstado was the first Chilean bank to open a branch in New York. This branch operates under the U.S. banking law.

== Subsidiaries ==
The bank has several subsidiaries that complement its activities. Among these are the following:

- Stock and securities trading: BancoEstado Corredores de Bolsa S.A. (1989)
- Insurance: BancoEstado Corredores de Seguros S.A. (1999)
- Mutual funds: BancoEstado Administradora General de Fondos S.A.
- Financial consulting: BancoEstado Microempresas S.A., Asesorías Financieras. (1995)
- BancoEstado Contacto 24 Horas S.A. (2001)
- Collections: BancoEstado Cobranzas (2000)

The bank also has a program known as "BancoEstado Cine" which since 2004 has supported Chilean film production.

== Industry development ==
By a decision of the Ministry of Economy, Development and Tourism, BancoEstado's mission includes fostering the development of private companies. To this end the bank has created several programs, including:

- Development Projects (Proyectos de Fomento)
- Small Entrepreneur Warranty Fund (Fondo de Garantía Pequeño Empresario)
- Supplier Development Program (Programa de Desarrollo de Proveedores)
- Technical Assistance Fund (Fondo de Asistencia Técnica)
