= Huneeus =

Huneeus is a surname. Notable people with the surname include:

- Cristián Huneeus (1935–1985), Chilean essayist and writer
- Pablo Huneeus (born 1940), Chilean writer and social critic
- Carlos Huneeus (born 1947), Chilean political scientist and diplomat
