= Sebastián Piñera =

President of Chile (2010–2014; 2018–2022)

His Excellency Sebastián Piñera
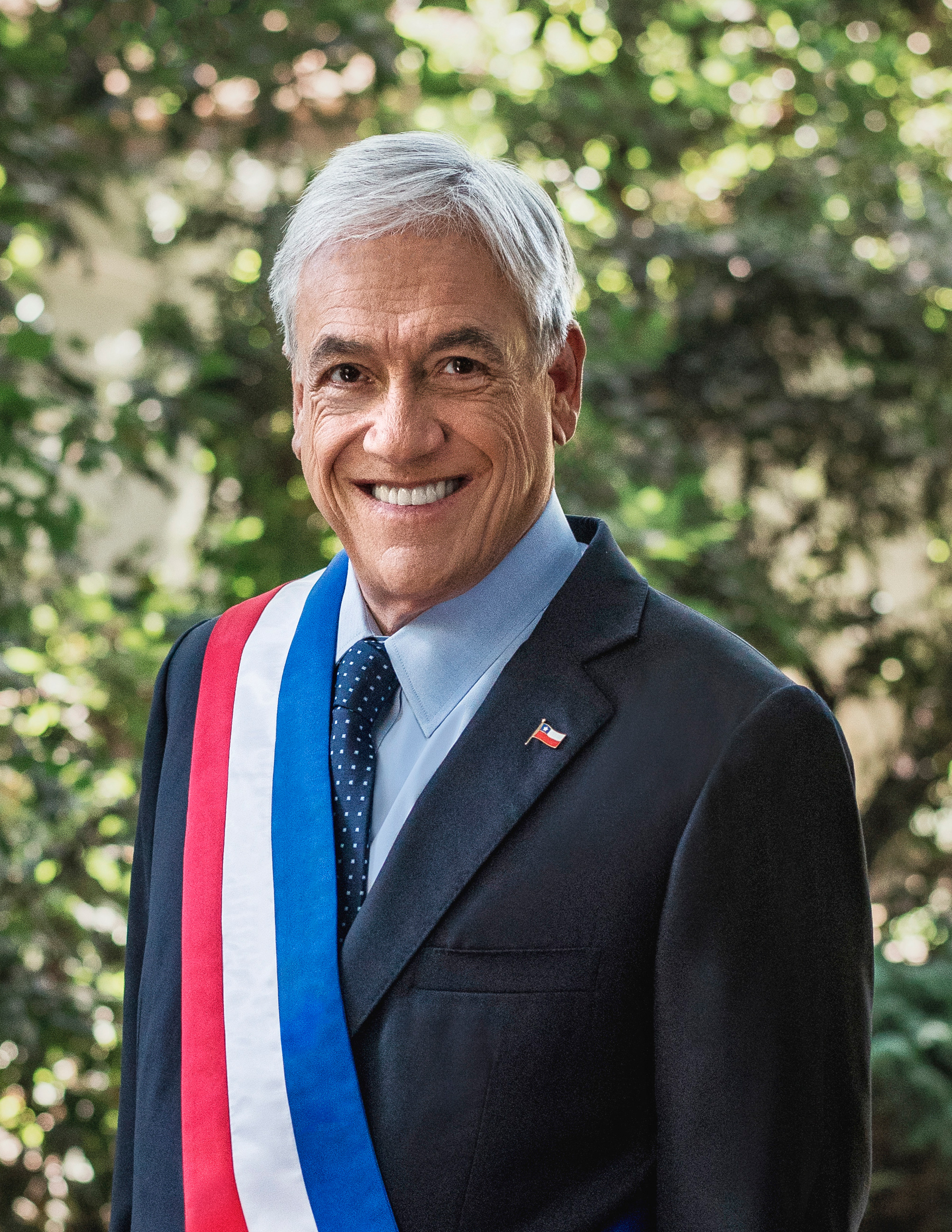
- Official portrait, 2018

35th & 37th President of Chile
- In office 11 March 2018 – 11 March 2022
- Preceded by: Michelle Bachelet
- Succeeded by: Gabriel Boric
- In office 11 March 2010 – 11 March 2014
- Preceded by: Michelle Bachelet
- Succeeded by: Michelle Bachelet

President pro tempore of PROSUR
- In office 22 March 2019 – 12 December 2020
- Preceded by: Position established
- Succeeded by: Iván Duque

Leader of National Renewal
- In office 26 May 2001 – 10 March 2004
- Preceded by: Alberto Cardemil
- Succeeded by: Sergio Diez

Member of the Senate
- In office 11 March 1990 – 11 March 1998
- Preceded by: Position established
- Succeeded by: Carlos Bombal

Personal details
- Born: Miguel Juan Sebastián Piñera Echenique; 1 December 1949 Santiago, Chile
- Died: 6 February 2024 (aged 74) Lake Ranco, Los Ríos Region, Chile
- Cause of death: Helicopter crash
- Resting place: Parque del Recuerdo
- Party: National Renewal (1989–2010) (Note: Membership suspended while President.); Independent (2010–2024)
- Other political affiliations: Coalition for Change (2009–2013); Chile Vamos (2015–2024)
- Spouse: Cecilia Morel (m. 1973)
- Children: 4
- Education: Pontifical Catholic University of Chile (BS); Harvard University (MA, PhD)
- Occupation: Businessman; Politician
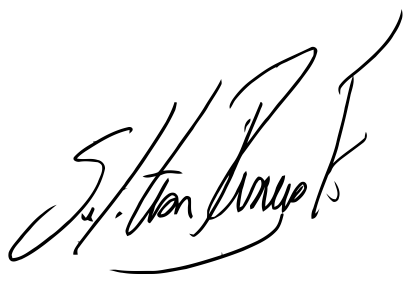
- Signature
- Website: Official website
- Nickname: Tatán

Miguel Juan Sebastián Piñera Echenique (Spanish: [miˈɣel ˈxwan seβasˈtjam piˈɲeɾa etʃeˈnike]; 1 December 1949 – 6 February 2024) was a Chilean businessman and politician who served as 34th and 36th president of Chile from 2010 to 2014 and from 2018 to 2022. The son of a Christian Democratic politician and diplomat, he studied business administration at the Pontifical Catholic University of Chile and economics at Harvard University. At the time of his death, he had an estimated net worth of US$2.7 billion, according to Forbes, making him the third richest person in Chile.

A member of the liberal-conservative National Renewal party, he served as a senator for the East Santiago district from 1990 to 1998, running for the presidency in the 2005 election, which he lost to Michelle Bachelet, and again, successfully, in 2010. As a result, he became Chile's first conservative president to be democratically elected since 1958, and the first to hold the office since the departure of Augusto Pinochet in 1990.

The legacy of Piñera's two administrations include the reconstruction following the 2010 Chile earthquake, the rescue of 33 trapped miners in 2010, a rapid response to the COVID-19 pandemic, and the legalization of same-sex marriage in Chile in 2021–2022. His administrations also faced the two largest protests movements since the return of democracy in 1990; the 2011 student protests and the more massive and violent 2019–2020 protests. After leaving office in 2022 Piñera developed amicable relations with the new left-wing president Gabriel Boric, who had previously been a harsh critic of him. Piñera died in a helicopter crash on Lake Ranco on 6 February 2024 at age 74. Piñera's supporters form a cross-party centre-right and right-wing faction called Piñerism.

== Early life and education ==
Piñera was born in Santiago on 1 December 1949, as the third child of José Piñera Carvallo (1917–1991) and Magdalena Echenique Rozas (1919–2000). Among his ancestors on his maternal side is his mother's great-great-grandmother, Luisa Pinto Garmendia, the sister of President Aníbal Pinto Garmendia and daughter of President Francisco Antonio Pinto and Luisa Garmendia Alurralde, who was a descendant of the penultimate Inca emperor, Huayna Capac. He was a nephew of the former oldest living Roman Catholic bishop in the world, Bernardino Piñera, who died in 2020 due to complications from COVID-19.

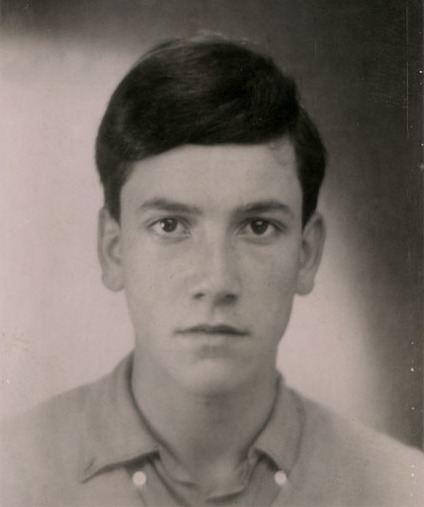
Piñera in 1965

Piñera's family moved to Belgium one year after his birth and later to New York City, where his father was the Chilean ambassador to the United Nations. Piñera returned to Chile in 1955 and enrolled in the Colegio del Verbo Divino ("Divine Word School"), from which he graduated in 1967.

Piñera then enrolled at the Pontifical Catholic University of Chile, from which he graduated in 1971 with an undergraduate degree in commercial engineering. Upon graduation, he was awarded the Raúl Iver Oxley Prize, which is given to the best overall student in each class.

Piñera continued on to Harvard University on a partial Fulbright Program for postgraduate studies in economics. During his time at Harvard, Piñera and a classmate coauthored an article, "The Old South's Stake in the Inter-Regional Movement of Slaves", for the Journal of Economic History. After three years at Harvard, Piñera graduated with both a Master of Arts and PhD in economics.

== Career ==
=== Teaching ===
Piñera was an economics lecturer from 1971 until 1988 at the University of Chile, the Pontifical Catholic University of Chile, and Adolfo Ibáñez University. In 1971, he was in charge of Economic Political Theory in the School of Economics at the University of Chile, and in 1972, at the Valparaiso Business School - currently Adolfo Ibanez University.

=== Foundations ===
In 1989, with Cecilia Morel, Danica Radic, and Paula Délano, Piñera created the Enterprising Women Foundation (Fundación Mujer Emprende), originally called The House of Youth (La Casa de la Juventud). The foundation aims to assist in the development of young women of lower income.

In 1973, Piñera created the foundation Fundación Futuro, of which he was president and whose directors are Cristián Boza D., María Teresa Chadwick P., Hugo Montes B., Cecilia Morel M., Renato Poblete S.J., and Fabio Valdés C. The head director of the foundation is Magdalena Piñera. The foundation's mission is to help in Chile's development of justice, freedom, and democracy. The foundation was renamed Fundación Cultura y Sociedad after Piñera was elected president.

Under the Fundación Cultura y Sociedad (formerly Fundación Futuro), the Grupo Tantauco has the mission of environmentalism, and is administered by Juan Carlos Urquidi. It was created to support the proposals Piñera instituted or planned to institute during his presidency. In 2005, Piñera created Tantauco Park (Spanish: Parque Tantauco), a 1,180 square kilometres (460 sq mi) a private natural reserve he bought and owned on the south end of Chiloé Island, to protect 118,000 hectares (290,000 acres) of the region's unique ecosystem. His foundation runs the park, which is open to the public and is an ecotourist location. Piñera bought the 118,000 hectares (290,000 acres) in Chiloé through an offshore company in Panama. He faced pressure to cede eight hectares to sixteen indigenous families whose presence pre-dates Piñera's purchase and who have spent years negotiating to obtain title to their familial lands.

An additional project, Grupo Tantauco: Derechos Humanos, was proposed in hopes of beginning a reconciliation between the Chilean people who suffered human rights violations during Augusto Pinochet's dictatorship.

=== Businesses ===
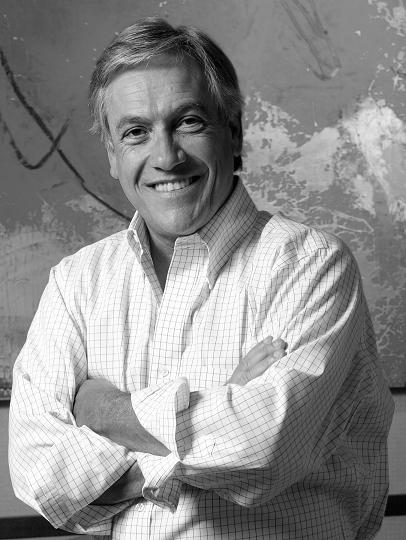
Before entering politics, Piñera was a successful businessman. Despite this, he faced several corruption charges during that period.

Piñera was general manager of the Banco de Talca. In 1982, a warrant was issued for his arrest on charges of violating banking law and fraudulent loans, in an event where over US$38 million was not paid to the Central Bank of Chile, Piñera being the Banco de Talca's CEO. The money disappeared and was never paid. Piñera spent 24 days in hiding while his brother, José Piñera, appealed the order, making some calls to underestimate the crime. A writ of habeas corpus, first rejected by the Appeals Court but then approved by the Supreme Court, acquitted Piñera. According to the Pandora Papers, Piñera's case was thrown out of court due to political intervention.

Piñera was also involved in the Chispas Case, on which a fraudulent buyout of the Chilean electrical company Enersis netted its participants over $400 million. All involved were convicted, resulting in a $75 million fine.

Between 1992 and 2004 Piñera engaged in tax evasion through the use of shell companies, for which he was never formally charged. Due to Pandora Papers leaks, he was formally charged for tax-evasion and bribery due to selling a family-owned copper mine Dominga to his best friend through shell companies registered in the British Virgin Islands.

Piñera once owned 90% of Chilevisión, a terrestrial television channel broadcasting nationwide. He also owned 27% of LAN Airlines (LAN); 13% of Colo-Colo, a football (soccer) club; and other minor stock positions in companies such as Quiñenco, Enersis, and Soquimich.

In July 2007, Piñera was fined approximately US$680,000 by Chile's securities regulator (SVS) for not withdrawing a purchase order after receiving privileged information (an infraction similar to insider trading) of LAN Airlines stock in mid-2006. Later that month, he resigned from the boards of LAN and Quintec.

To avoid a conflict of interest, he sold Chilevisión for $160 million in 2010 to Time Warner. He also sold his shares of LAN in several rounds between February and March 2010.

Piñera built an estimated fortune of US$2.8 billion as of February 2018, according to Forbes magazine. His wealth was largely due to his involvement in introducing credit cards to Chile in the late 1970s and his subsequent investments, mainly in LAN Airlines stock. Piñera acquired shares of the formerly state-owned company from Scandinavian Airlines in 1994, as part of a joint venture with the Cueto family.

== Political career ==
In 1988, after Pinochet had lost the referendum on his continued rule and Chile was returning to democracy, Piñera offered his support for the Christian Democrat Eduardo Frei Ruiz-Tagle in his pre-candidacy for president.

Between 11 March 1990 and 11 March 1998, Piñera was senator for Eastern Santiago.

In 1998, Piñera opposed the arrest and detention of Augusto Pinochet in London, initiated by Baltasar Garzón, arguing that it was an attack on Chile's sovereignty and dignity.

On 14 May 2005, in a surprise move, Piñera announced his candidacy for the 2005 presidential election (RN was supposed to support UDI's Lavín). He described his political philosophy as Christian humanism.

=== 2009–10 presidential elections ===
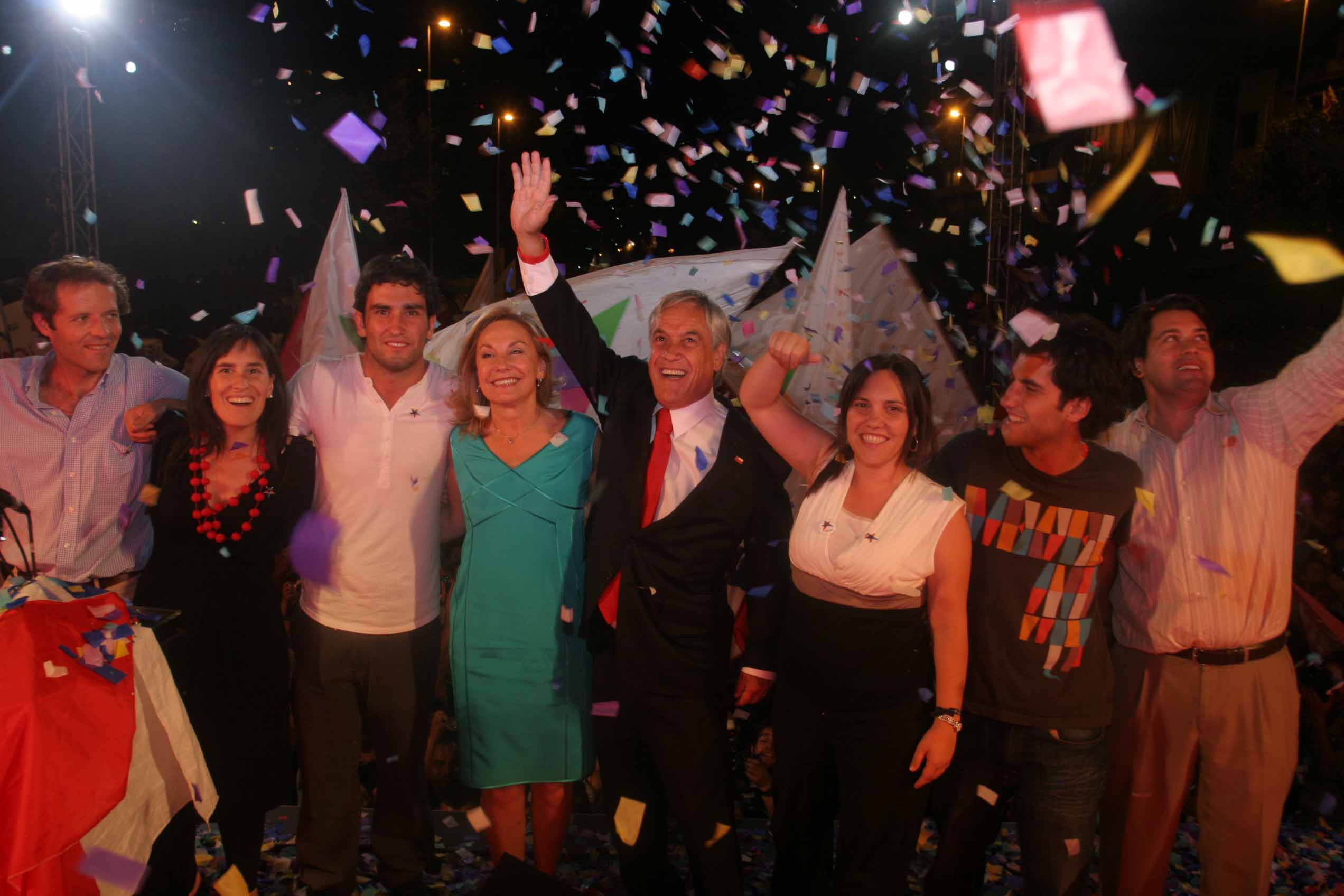
Piñera celebrates alongside his wife and family after winning the 2009–10 presidential election

Piñera ran for President of Chile in the 2009–2010 election. From August 2009, he led in opinion polls, competing with left-of-center candidates Eduardo Frei Ruiz-Tagle, Marco Enríquez-Ominami, and Jorge Arrate. In the 13 December 2009 election, Piñera placed first in the results with 44.05% of the votes, while Frei placed second with 29.6%. Neither candidate received more than half of the total votes; therefore, as per the Constitution, Chileans returned to the polls for a final run-off election on Sunday, 17 January 2010.

That evening, the third and final preliminary results were announced by the Undersecretary of the Interior, accounting for 99.77% of the total ballot boxes. Piñera received 51.61% of the votes and Frei received 48.39%.

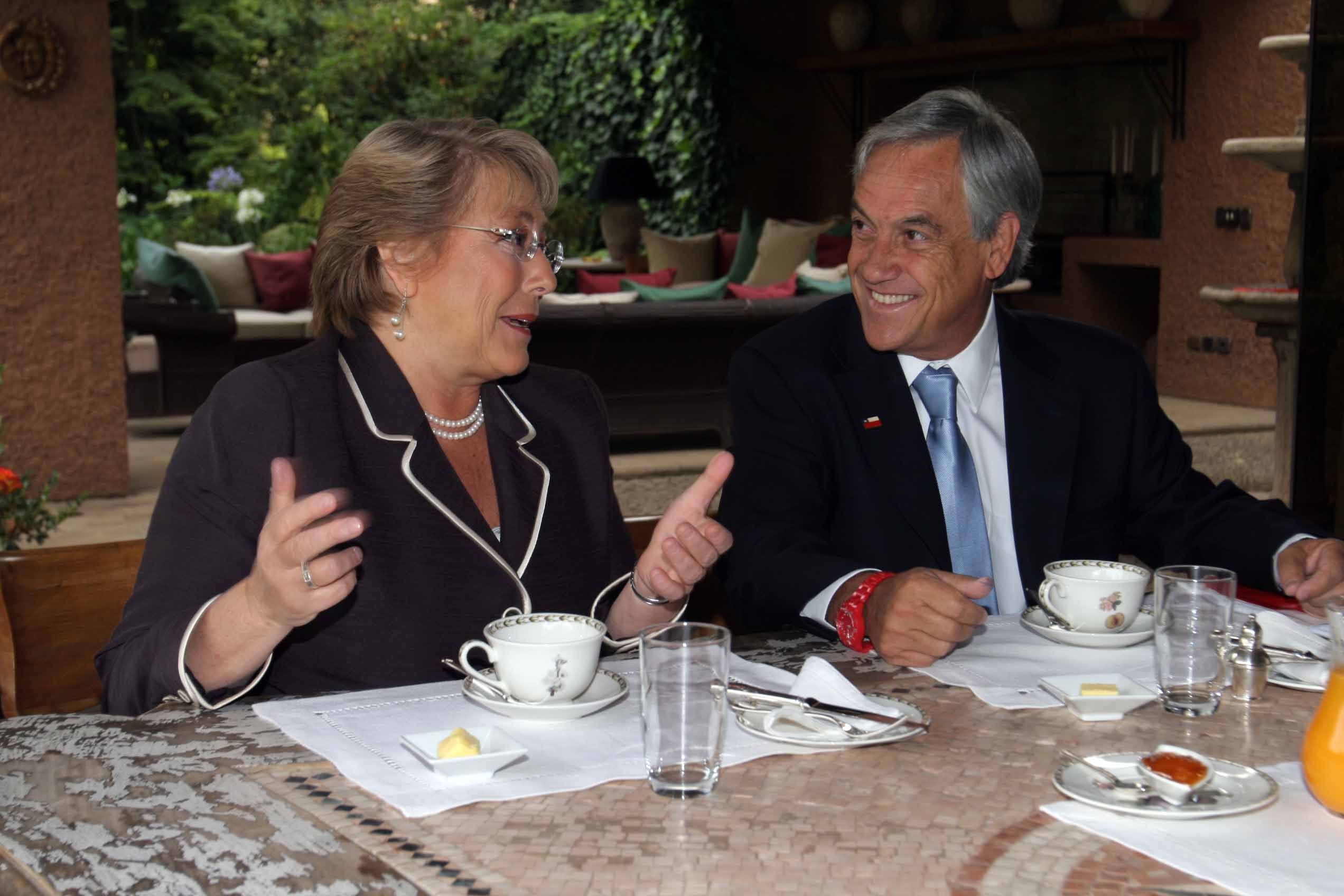
Piñera meeting with Michelle Bachelet during the presidential transition

Piñera invested an estimated US$13.6 million in his presidential campaign, which included items such as a campaign anthem and "Thank You" banners. Piñera's banners and billboards carried statements throughout the country such as "Delinquents, your party is over," and "Small businesses, Big opportunities". Piñera's campaign released a national TV spot on YouTube featuring a male gay couple, something never seen before in a presidential campaign run in Chile. Amongst his promises were increasing education rates and improving international relations with the neighboring nation of Peru.

Piñera's victory meant a shift towards the right, breaking two-decades of center-left political leadership in Chile and I. the process becoming the first elected right-wing leader in 52 years.

On 28 January, Piñera suspended his membership in National Renewal party and unofficially became an independent. RN's bylaws require successful presidential candidates from the party to renounce their association to govern the country fairly, foremost with the interest of the people, not with the interest of a political party or particular political philosophy.

=== Private to public transition ===
Piñera became the first billionaire to be sworn into the Chilean Presidency. He offered to sell his shares in major corporations before being sworn in on 11 March 2010, to avoid conflicts of interest. Piñera placed US$400 million in blind trusts.

The Monday following Piñera's election, expectations of sale from his largest holdings created a surge in trade of Axxion and LAN shares, causing three brief suspensions (19–20, 22 January 2010) in the Santiago Stock Exchange to ease trade. Axxion shares more than tripled before falling 39% on Friday, 22 January. Bachelet's Finance Minister Andrés Velasco urged Piñera to get the sale "sorted out quickly." The value of Piñera's interest in Axxion was estimated at US$700 million, of his US$1.2 billion fortune at the beginning of that week.

On 5 February, Piñera confirmed plans to sell his 26.3% stake in LAN airlines at an extraordinary shareholders' meeting for his main holding company, Axxion. Under the pact, Axxion shareholders have agreed to fix the price of the sale, estimated at US$1.5 billion. The Cueto family, who at that point held 25.5% of LAN through their holding company Costa Verde Aeronáutica, had the first option to purchase the stake. On 18 February, Axxion posted a statement on their website confirming the sale of a 21.18% stake in LAN Airlines to the Cueto family for US$1.23 billion. Announcement regarding the sale of the remaining shares was pending until March 2010, when the whole package left Piñera's hands.

Piñera sold his 9.7% stake in the upscale private hospital Clinica Las Condes at a price of 25,113 CLP per share (US$48.00) through his holding company Bancard on Tuesday, 16 February. The total sale of the 792,000 shares grossed US$37.85 million and was purchased by the brokerage firm Celfin. The proceeds from the sale will go to paying off Bancard debt.

Piñera announced in February he had the intention to transfer 100% of his stake in Chilevisión to a not-for-profit organization called Fundación Cultura y Sociedad (formerly Fundación Futuro), of which he was owner. The foundation's board will include some of the station's current executives. Under that proposal, Piñera maintains the right to remove and replace the foundation's president at any given time. Cristián Patricio Larroulet Vignau, current Minister of the Secretariat of the Presidency of Chile, stated that Piñera was honoring his promise of removing himself from private corporations, as Chilevision will become the property of a non-profit organization. MP Cristián Monckeberg (RN), stated there was no law obligating Piñera to do otherwise and thus this decision was legally legitimate. The option above did not take place in the end; Piñera decided to sell the TV station, and after a failed attempt in May 2010 with the Linzor Capital investment fund, the president announced it had sold Chilevisión to Time Warner, in late August 2010.

Piñera said he would not sell his 12.5% stake in Blanco y Negro, a company that owns the Colo-Colo soccer team. He stated: "We want big things and not only achieve local victories. The idea is to return the Copa Libertadores to Chile. That is our great goal." Although he will remain part owner, he will take no administrative duties or role while President.

=== Council of Ministers ===
Piñera announced his "cabinet of unity" on 9 February 2010 in Chile's National Historical Museum. The cabinet was made up of 16 men and 6 women. Among Piñera's nominees was Jaime Ravinet, the previous president's defense minister; until accepting Piñera's offer, he had been a member of the Christian Democratic Party. Another nominee was Cristián Larroulet, who was an economic planning adviser under Pinochet. Piñera first met with his new ministers one day later and issued a formal memorandum calling upon all members to renounce their positions in all private companies by 28 February to avoid conflicts of interest. The memorandum also said that in regards to national heritage, secretaries of state whose affiliation with companies having direct receipt of fiscal monies must either remove themselves from those associations or honor the restrictions of their competitors.

== First presidency (2010–2014) ==
=== Cabinet ===
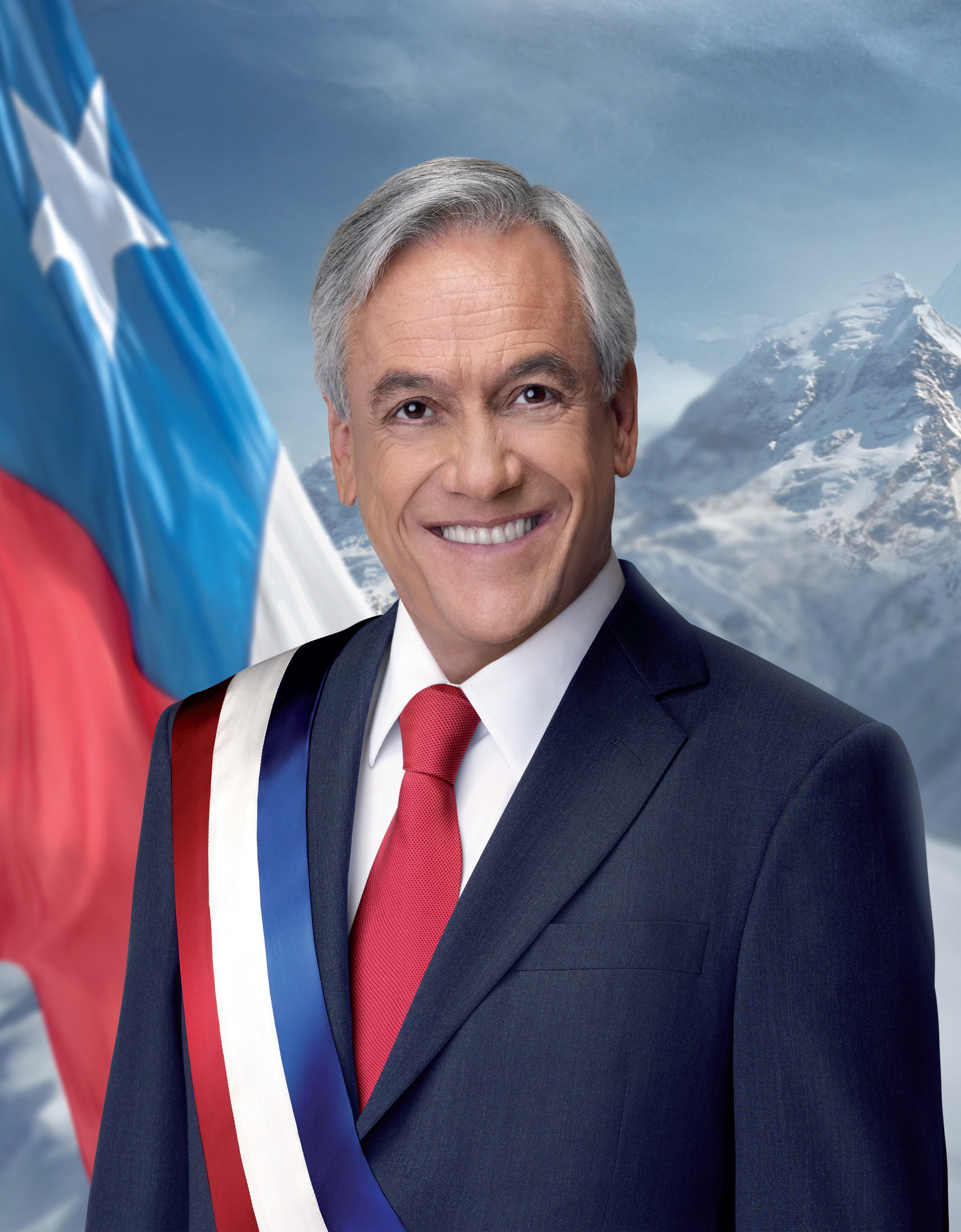
Piñera's official portrait for his first term as president

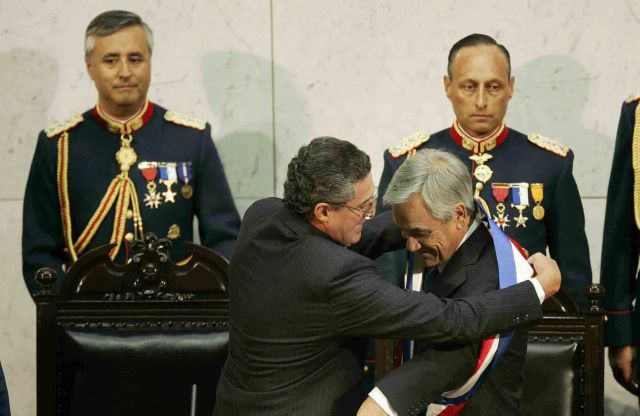
Piñera receives the presidential sash from Senate President Jorge Pizarro at the National Congress of Chile on 11 March 2010

Piñera was sworn in as the 34th President of the Republic of Chile on 11 March 2010, in a ceremony held in a plenary session of the National Congress in Valparaíso. In the same ceremony, Piñera's Cabinet ministers were sworn in. The ceremony was also marked by a 6.9 M_{w} earthquake and subsequent aftershocks that upset the invitees.

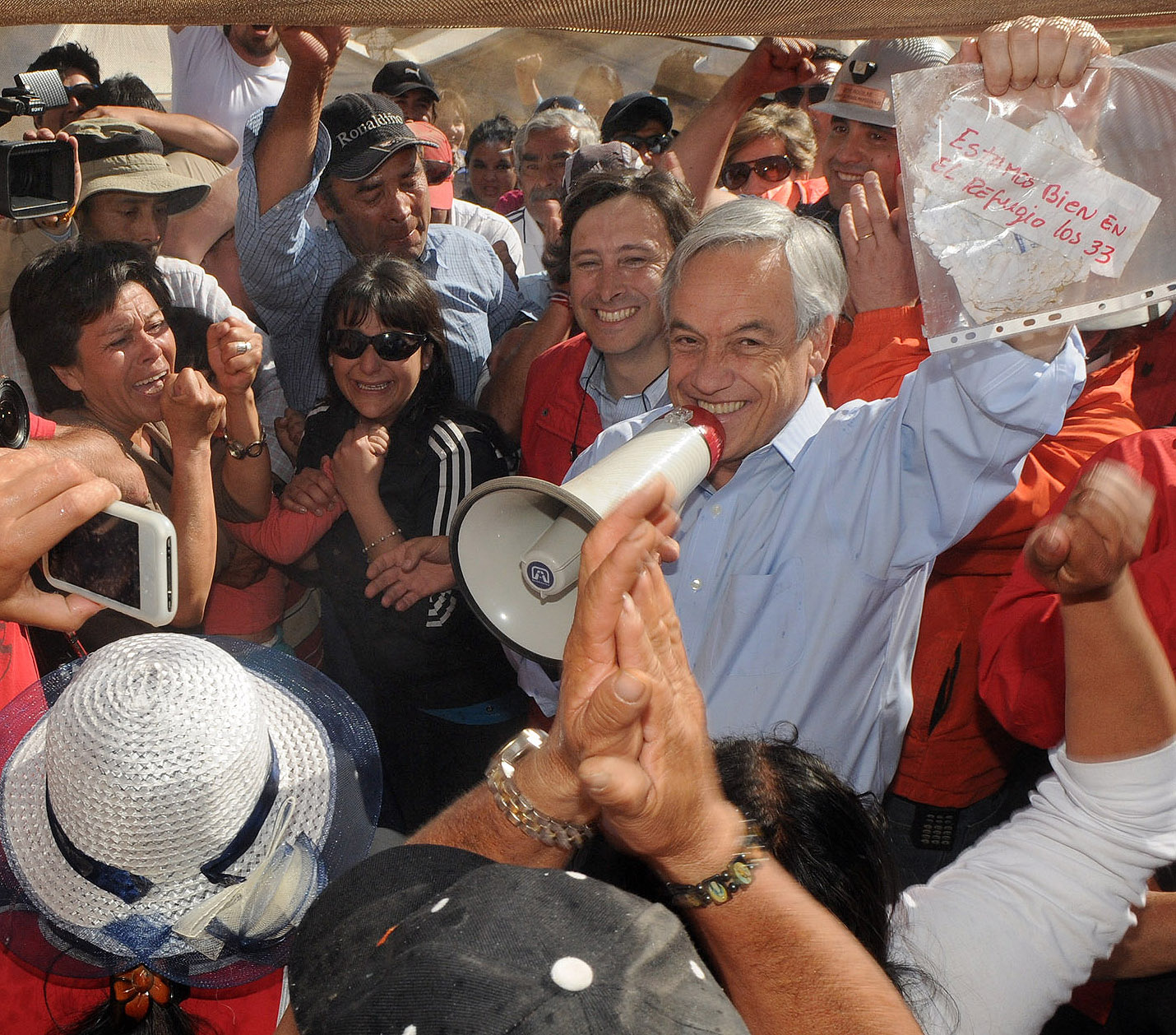
President Sebastián Piñera during the 2010 Copiapó mining accident rescue efforts, with a paper confirming that the 33 miners were alive.

Among the milestones of his first government was the rescue of the San José mine in 2010, a year in which Chile lived the Bicentennial, in addition to the earthquake of 27 February and the subsequent reconstruction of the country after it. The national soccer team participated in the 2010 FIFA World Cup in South Africa, the approval of a tax reform for education (increasing taxes), the Zamudio law (a law against discrimination in favor of sexual minorities), the closure of the Cordillera prison and the installation in the political discourse of the concept of "passive accomplices" from the Pinochet Government, the reception of the decision of the International Court of Justice in The Hague on the maritime delimitation between Chile and Peru in 2014, the six-month postnatal law, the sending of the Civil Union Agreement law, the creation of Chile Atiende, the automatic registration, voluntary voting and primary laws, the law for the direct election of regional councilors, the elimination of the 7% contribution charge for retirees, the creation of the Ethical Family Income, the Luchsinger-Mackay case, the student protests of 2011, in addition to protests in the Chilean Patagonia. He helped to create the Pacific Alliance, started recognizing the State of Palestine, participated in the Colombian peace process and celebrated the Summit between the Community of Latin American and Caribbean States and the European Union in Santiago in 2013.

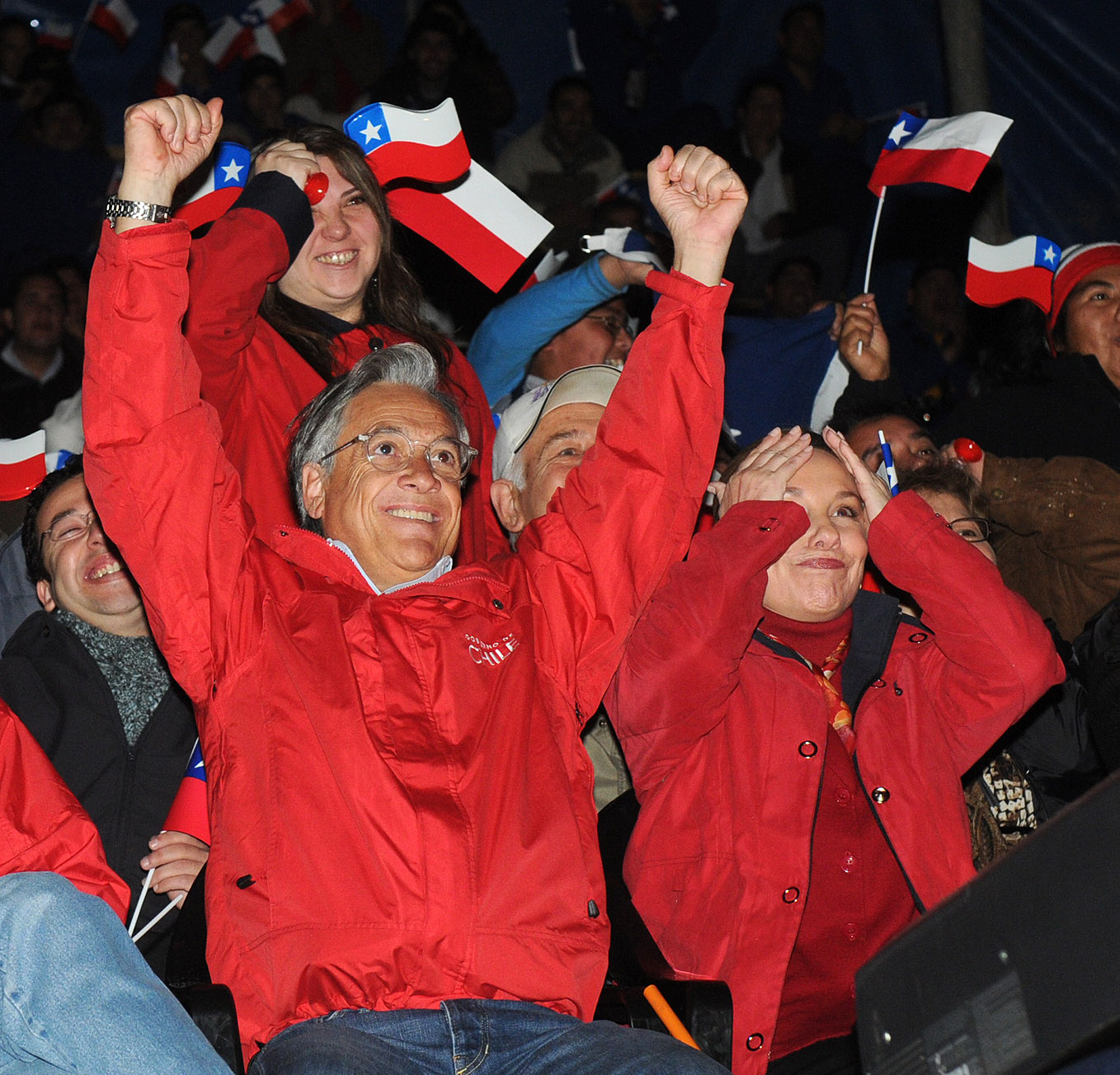
President Piñera watching the Chile vs. Switzerland match in the 2010 FIFA World Cup.

In 2014, during the end of his term, the president highlighted the creation of 990 thousand new jobs, in addition to the fact that the country was in a position to grow economically between 6 or 7%, in addition to the reduction of poverty rates in the country.

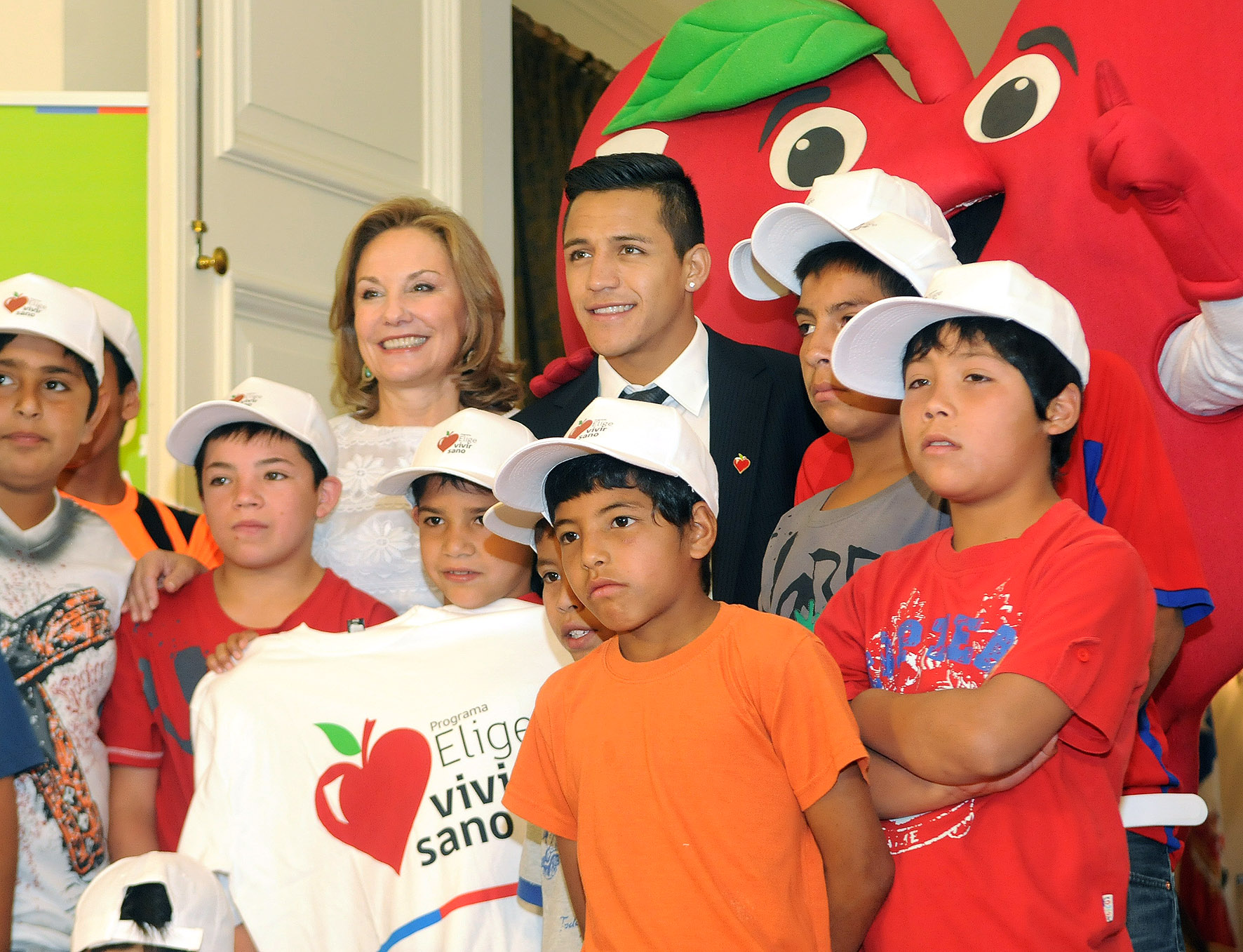
Football player Alexis Sánchez promoting the Elige Vivir Sano program with First Lady Cecilia Morel.

The first lady, Cecilia Morel, was in charge of the Elige Vivir Sano program, and the Ministry of Sports and the Ministry of Social Development were created during the administration.

The composition of his government was marked by the presence of former officials of the Pinochet dictatorship. For example, the head of the cabinet of the Undersecretary of Defence, Major Mario Larenas Gutiérrez, was accused by the communist deputy Hugo Gutiérrez of having participated in the Caravan of Death following the 1973 coup. The same deputy recalled the past of the general appointed by Piñera as director of the Gendarmerie, Iván Andrusco, who had worked at DICOMCAR, a repressive body dissolved following the Caso Degollados (1985), and who had been forced to resign.

On 12 October 2010, Piñera rallied his countrymen in the rescue of 33 trapped miners, all of whom were rescued after 70 days following a mining accident near Copiapó. "Chile will never be the same", he said to the miners' foreman, Luis Urzúa, as he (the last of the miners to emerge from the cavern) greeted Piñera, in a broadcast carried live across the globe.

Despite much goodwill in Chile following this incident, he faced continuing opposition from Chileans calling for amendments to anti-terrorism laws on the grounds that Mapuche Indigenists could be treated as terrorists. This matter led to hunger strikes which started before the mining disaster, and were set to continue afterward. The Araucanía Region suffers from constant burnings of trucks and private infrastructure by some radical groups.

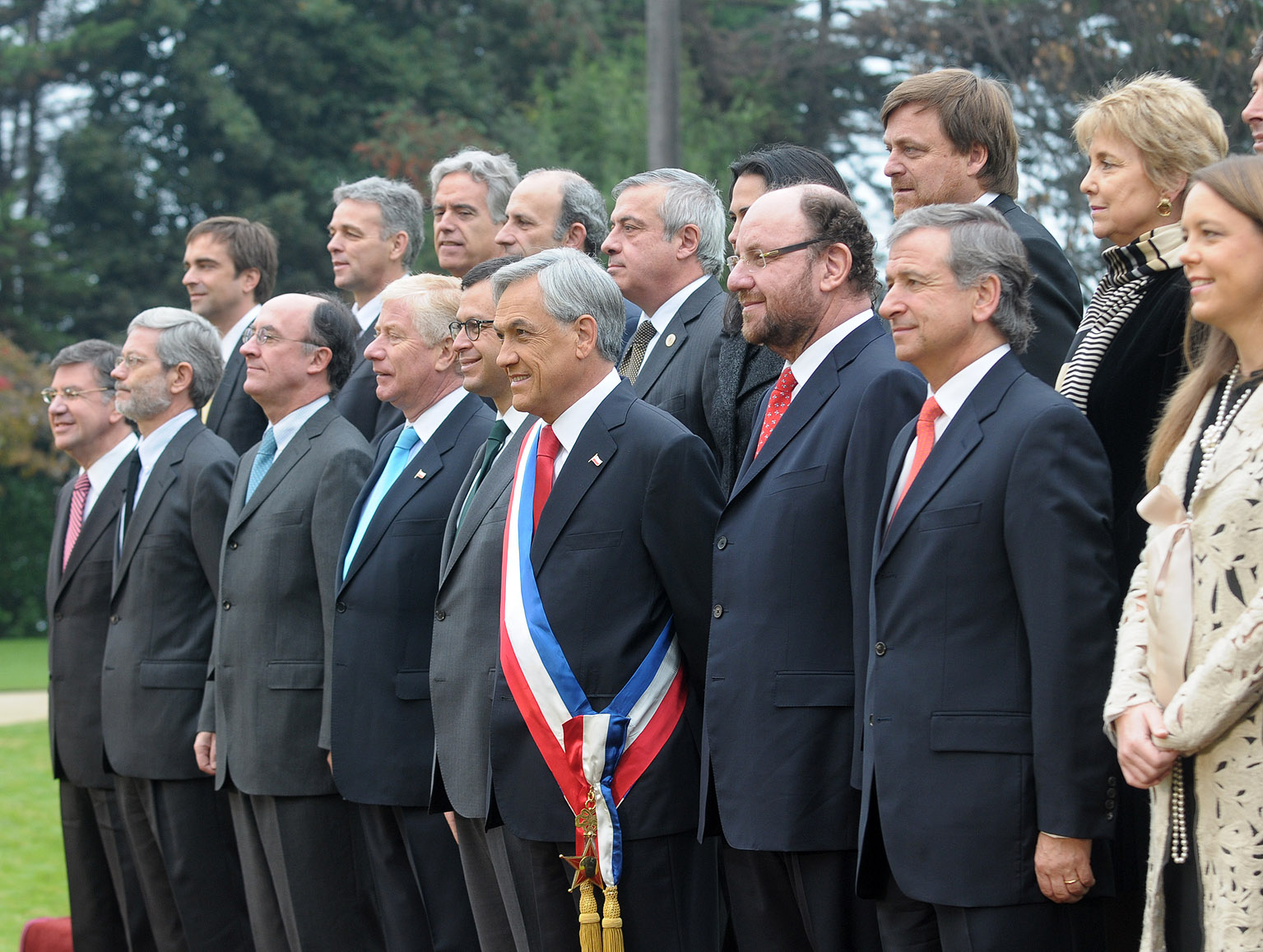
Sebastián Piñera and his Council of Ministers in Chile's Palacio de Cerro Castillo

In January 2011 he faced protests in Magallanes Region in response to a proposed increase in the price of natural gas there by 16.8%. The protests left more than two thousand cars isolated while trying to cross from the Argentine province of Tierra del Fuego to the province of Santa Cruz through Chilean territory. Another 1,500 tourists were left without movement in Torres del Paine National Park after routes to Puerto Natales and El Calafate were cut. In consequence, on 14 January, Minister Secretary General of Government Ena von Baer announced changes in Sebastián Piñera's government cabinet, including the resignation of Ricardo Raineri as Energy Minister. Laurence Golborne became Mining and Energy Minister, on 16 January.

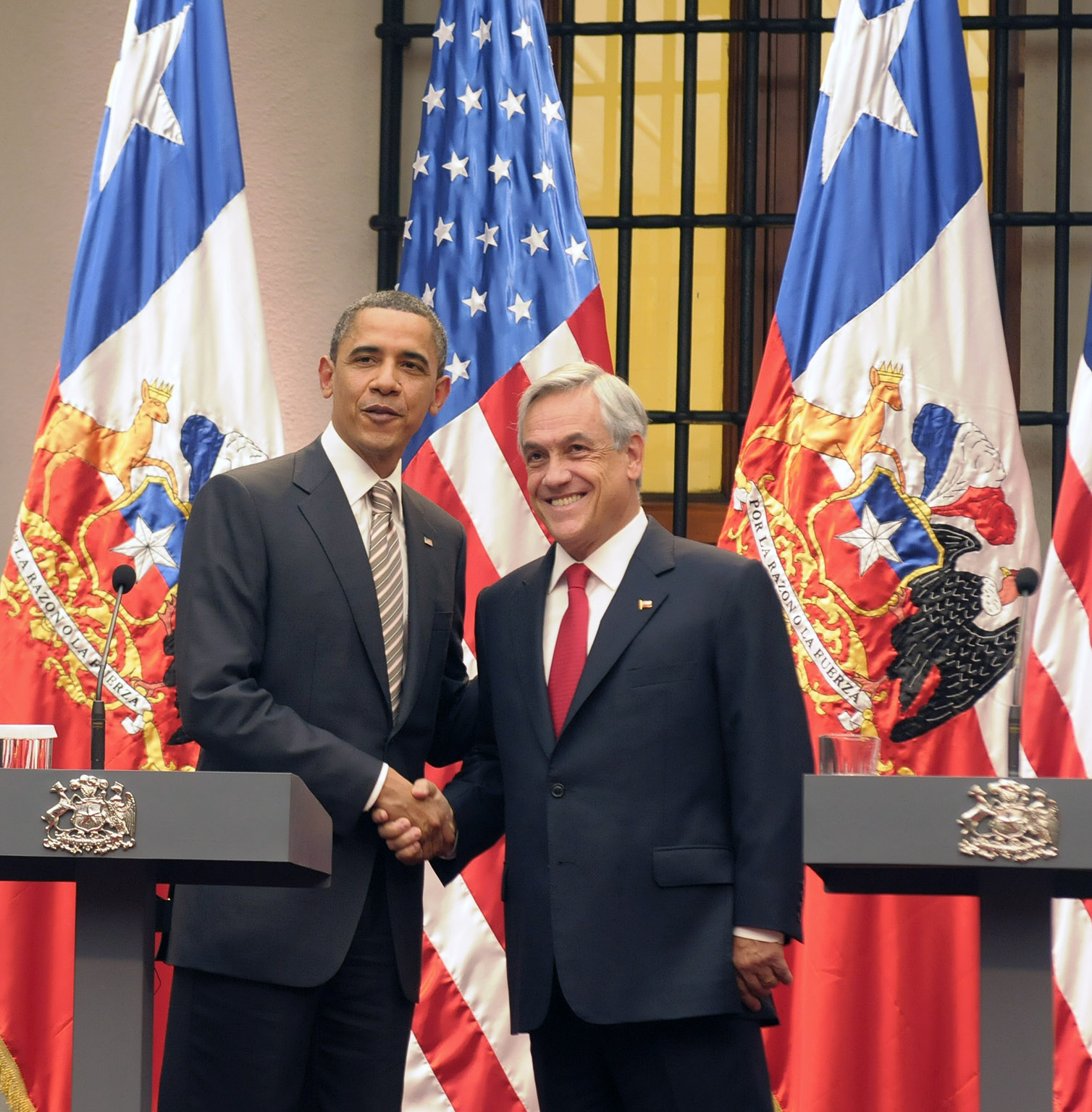
Presidents Barack Obama and Sebastián Piñera at La Moneda Palace in 2011.

Amidst the severe 2011 Chilean student protests Piñera shuffled his cabinet and removed Joaquín Lavín from the post of minister of education. With respect to the protest, Piñera defended for-profit activity in education and proposed to legalize it, rejecting the students' demands for the public ownership of educational establishments. During August 2011, Piñera's public approval declined precipitously amidst continuous protests, to the extent that some polls indicated that he was the least popular Chilean leader since Augusto Pinochet. His approval ratings dropped to as low as 22% according to a CERC survey. As such, Piñera's chances of passing sought reforms were seen as remote.

=== Foreign affairs ===
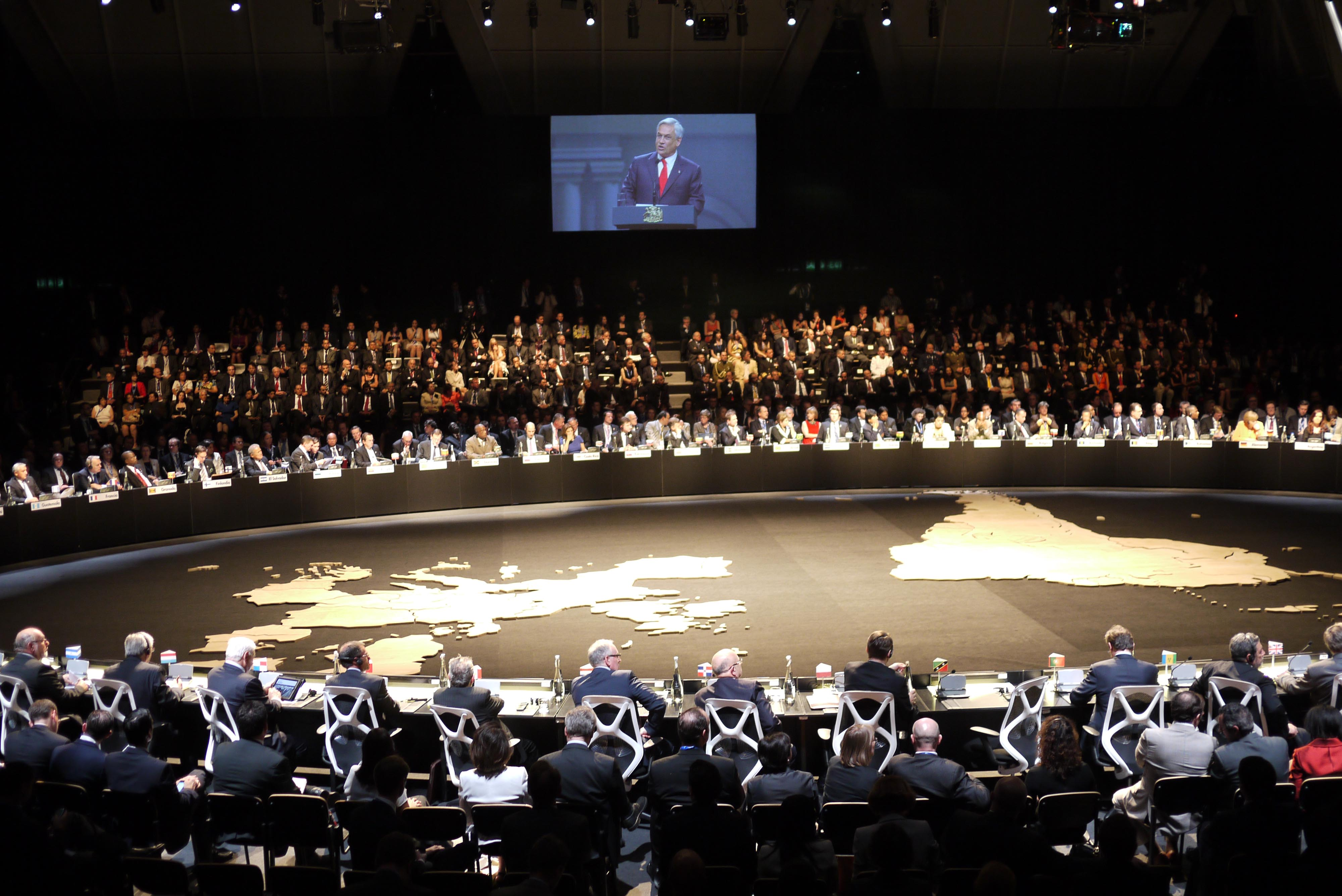
President Piñera speaking during the 2013 Celac-European Union Summit organized in Santiago by his administration.

In March 2011, President Piñera led a state visit to Spain to boost relations between the two countries. While in Spain, President and Mrs Piñera, with Prince Felipe and Princess Letizia, opened the exhibition "Don Qui. El Quijote de Matta", at the Cervantes Institute of Madrid.

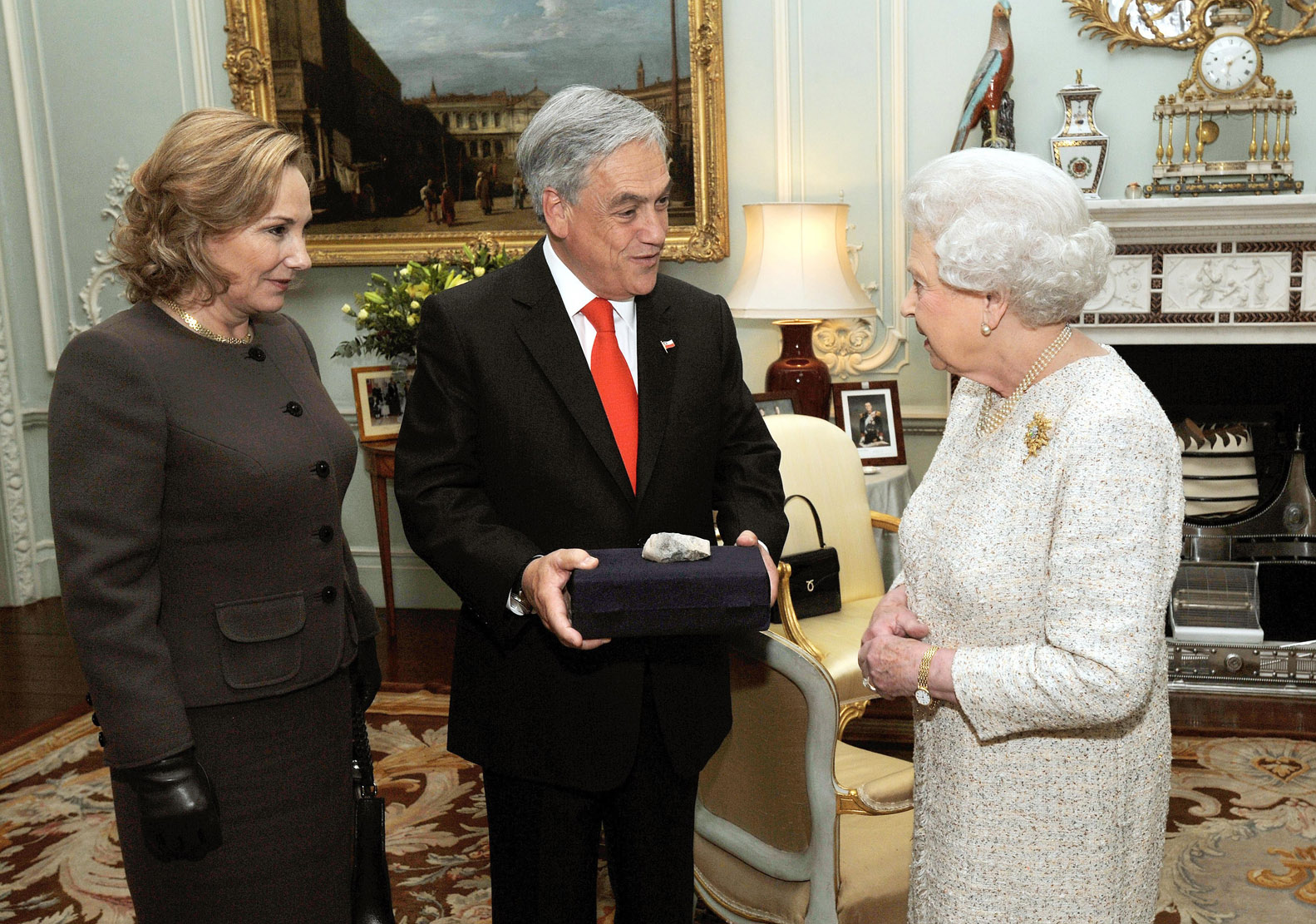
President Piñera & First Lady Morel with Elizabeth II during their state visit to United Kingdom in October 2010

As president, Piñera expressed support for the Argentine claim on the Falkland Islands, referring to "the unrenounceable rights of Argentina on the islands". In March 2012, Piñera visited Vietnam with the intention of increasing cooperation between the two countries in general and with Ho Chi Minh City, Vietnam's most populous and largest economic hub, in particular. HCM City also called for a Chilean sister city while receiving Piñera on 23 March. The visit included the signing of a bilateral trade agreement and several cooperation pacts in education, tourism, culture, and finance.

Piñera had a fundamental role in the creation of the Pacific Alliance, and also involved Chile in the international arena by celebrating the CELAC-EU Summit in Santiago in 2013 in which he had a discussion with Bolivian President Evo Morales on the topic of the Bolivian Government demanding sea access.

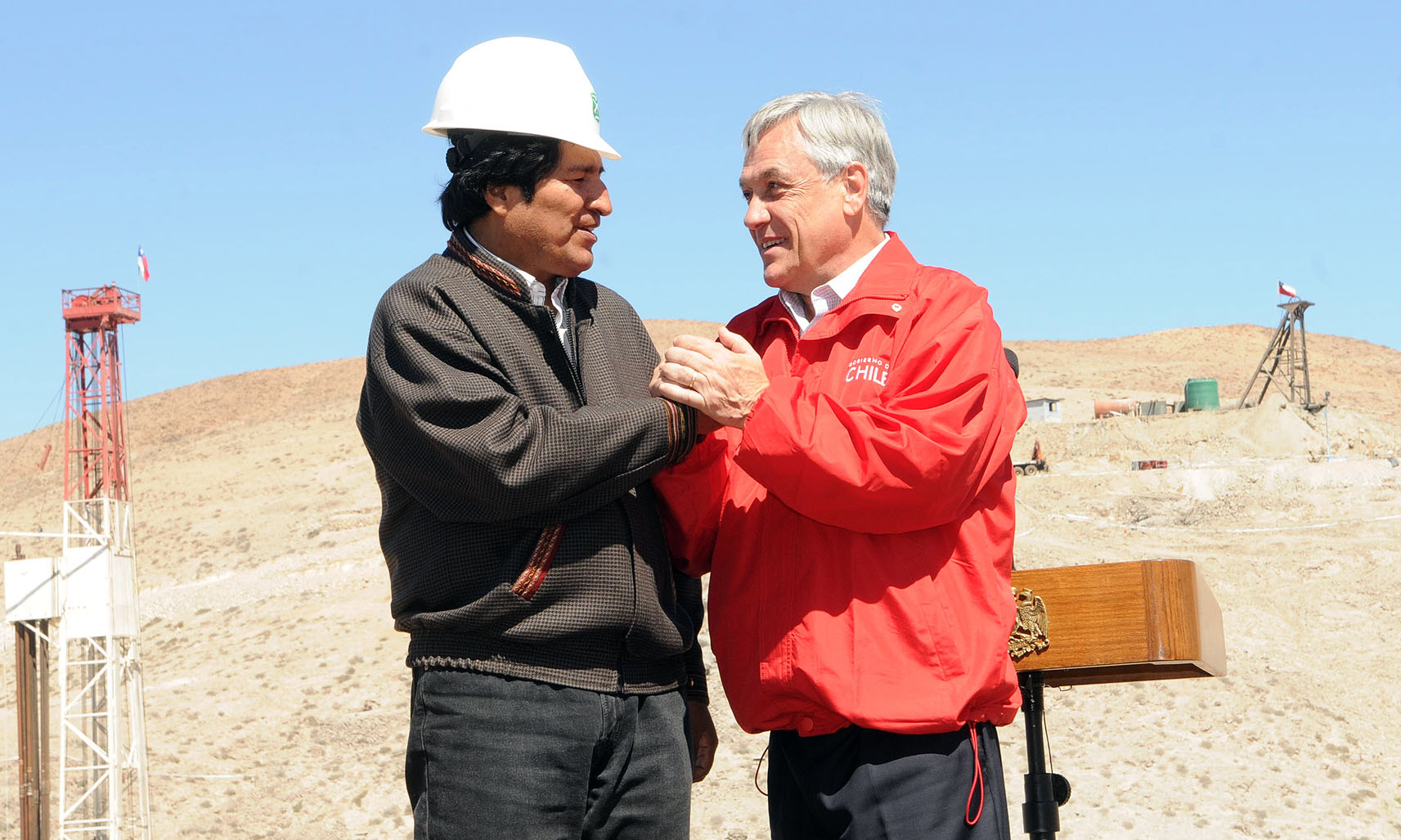
President Piñera with Bolivian President Evo Morales at the San José Mine in 2010.

=== Criticism ===
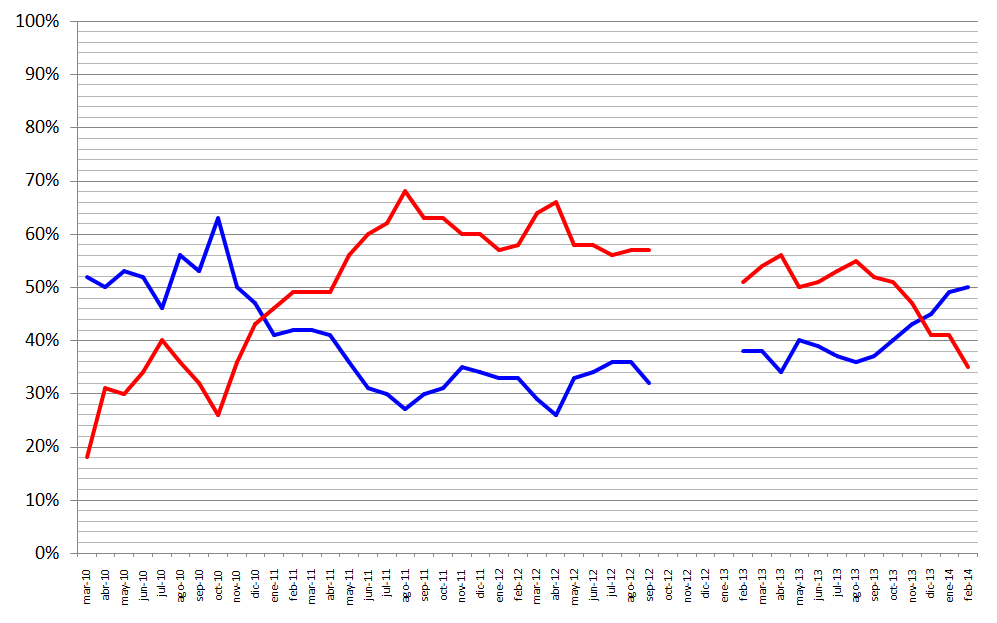
Levels of approval (blue) and disapproval (red) of Piñera's term from 2010 to 2014, according to the Adimark survey. Piñera left office in March 2014 with an approval rating of 50%

Early in 2012, physicist Frank Duarte sharply criticized Piñera's performance in the handling of the Chilean–Peruvian maritime dispute at The Hague, deemed as favoring commercial interests over the interest of the Chilean people, and called for Chile's withdrawal from The Hague. Following the adverse ruling against Chile in 2014, several political figures in Chile, from a variety of political parties, also called for Chile's withdrawal from The Hague that would, in addition, imply a withdrawal from the Pact of Bogota.

According to Hermógenes Pérez de Arce Ibieta, President Piñera had pushed for Harold Mayne-Nicholls to be replaced as President of the Chilean Football Board in 2010. Pérez de Arce hold Piñera, owner of football club Colo-Colo, had a long-term interest in removing Mayne-Nicholls from the Presidency of the Chilean Football Board. Marcelo Bielsa, the manager of the Chile national football team, subsequently made headlines for his brief and cold greeting to Piñera in the farewell before the 2010 FIFA World Cup. Both Bielsa and Mayne-Nicholls had good relations with former president Michelle Bachelet, Piñera's political rival.

== First post-presidency (2014–2018) ==
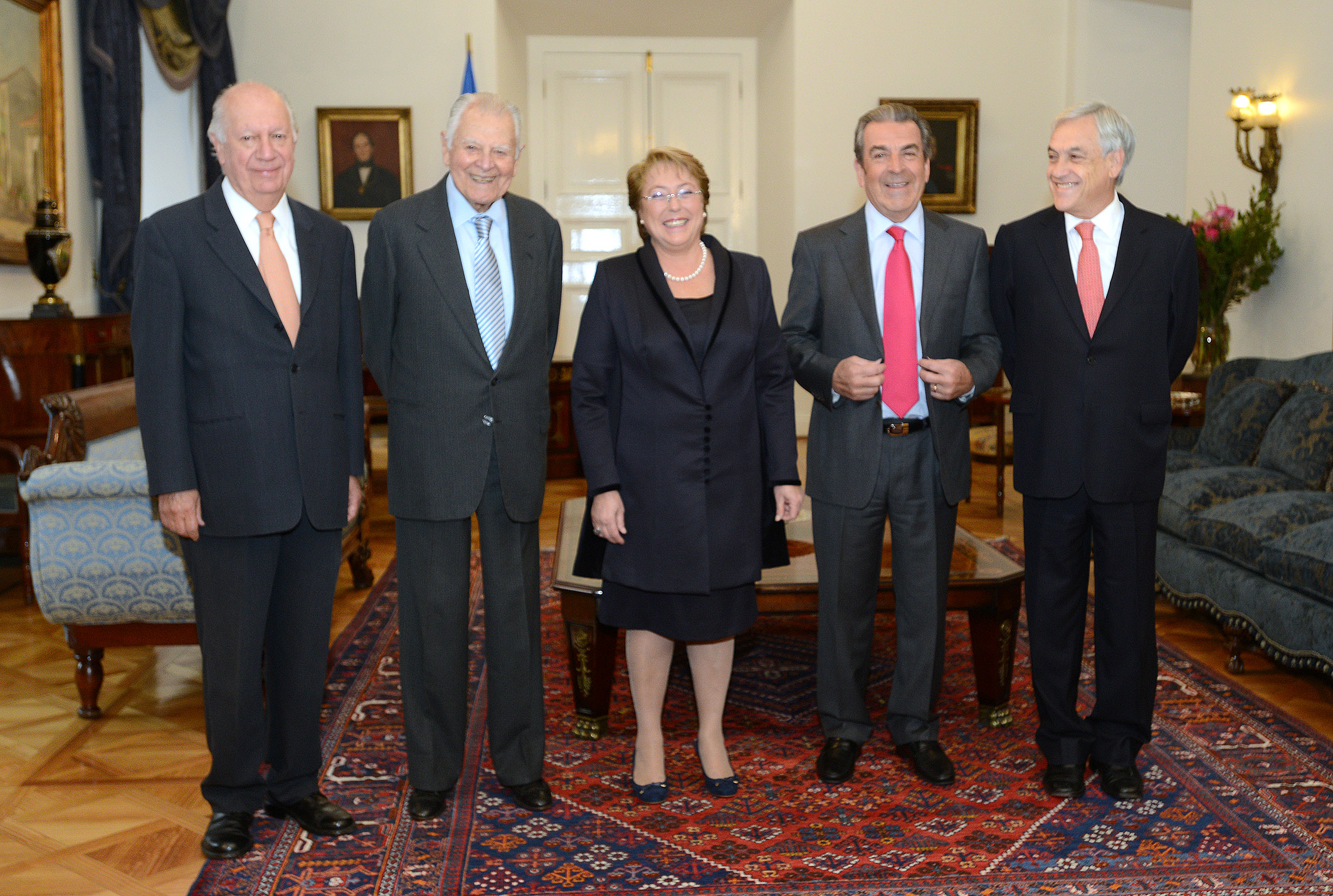
Piñera, together with President Bachelet and the other former presidents of Chile, in 2014.

Following his departure from power on 11 March 2014, Piñera dedicated himself to the creation of Fundación Avanza Chile, a center-right think tank that sought to play an important role in the opposition to Michelle Bachelet's government. In addition to Piñera, several of his former ministers were members of the foundation's board. At the same time, the former president participated in conferences and seminars.

In May 2014, he was invited to join the Club of Madrid.

== 2017 presidential elections ==
Piñera's campaign logo in the first round of the election

Piñera's campaign logo in the second round of the election

On 17 December 2017, Sebastián Piñera was elected president of Chile for a second term. He received 36% of the votes, the highest percentage among the eight candidates in the election. In the second round, Piñera faced Alejandro Guillier, a television news anchor who represented Bachelet's New Majority (Nueva Mayoría) coalition. Piñera won the elections with 54% of the votes.

During the campaign, much emphasis was placed on anti-communism with the slogan "Chilezuela" in reference to the Chilean left on social media. Piñera received support from his right-wing rival in the first round, José Antonio Kast, in the second round. Piñera promised to lower taxes from 27% to 24%, criticizing Bachelet's tax reform. Piñera promised to lead a "modern right".

== Second presidency (2018–2022) ==
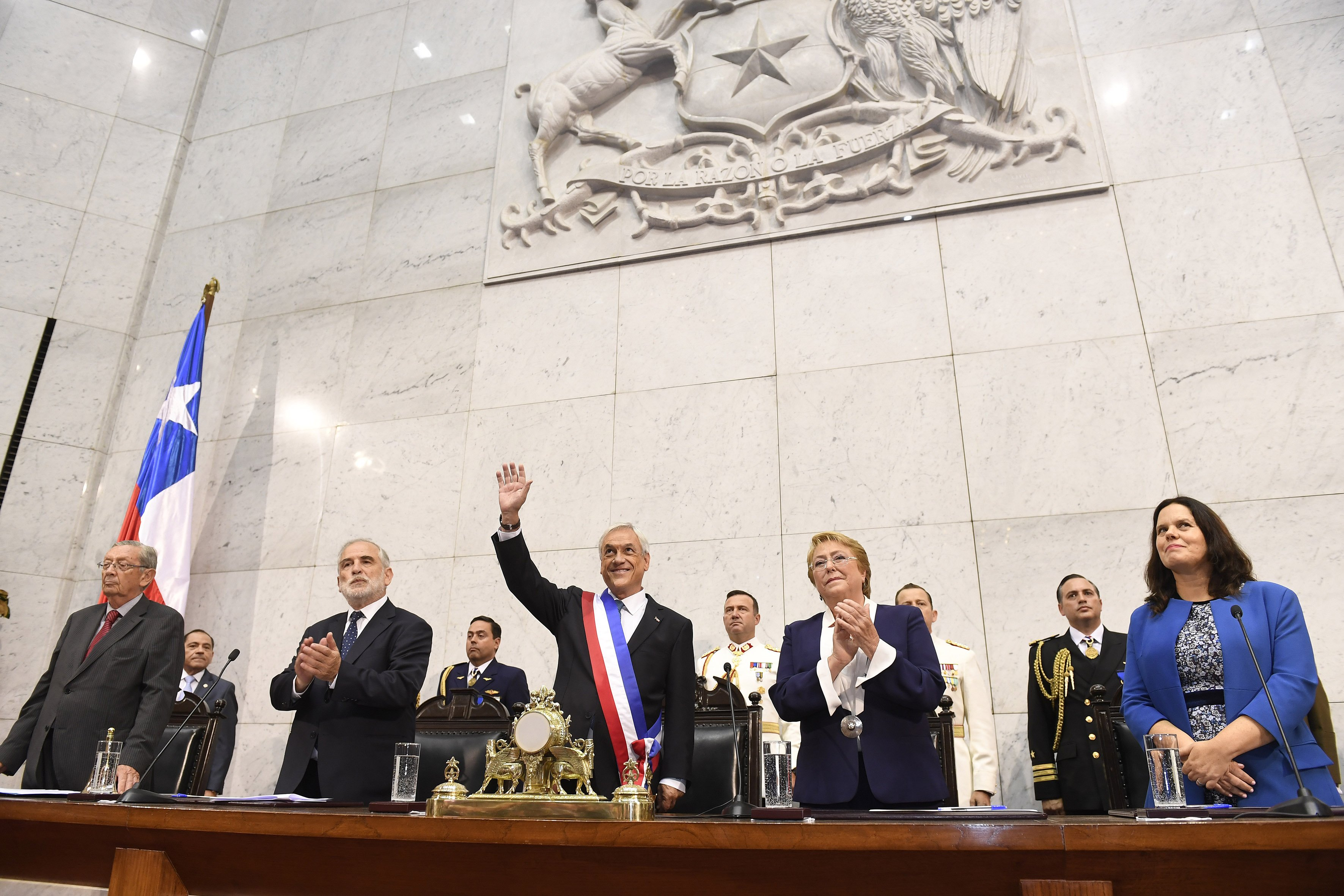
President Piñera receives presidential sash and the O'Higgins Pioche for the second time, 11 March 2018

Piñera took office for a second time on 11 March 2018, succeeding the outgoing Michelle Bachelet. Environmental NGOs accused the government of yielding to pressure from the mining lobby to thwart any draft legislation. In 2018, Piñera buried an initiative to ban industrial activities near glaciers. In 2019, a draft law from the ranks of the opposition caused tensions. It is supposed to convert glaciers and their surrounding environment "into protected areas, prohibiting any intervention except scientific and that can benefit sustainable tourism". At least 44 mining projects will likely be completed between 2019 and 2028.

In May 2018, in response to massive feminist demonstrations, his government adopted The Women's Agenda, which combined a conservative social vision and economic liberalism. In June 2021, Piñera said that he would push for the adoption of a same-sex marriage bill, drawing criticism from his conservative allies. In December 2021 he enacted the law before the second round of the presidential election. Previously in 2019 he enacted the gender identity law.

During the end of the administration, the Universal Guaranteed Pension was enacted, benefiting 2.5 million Chileans. In addition, he started the organization of the 2023 Pan American Games.

=== Cabinet ===
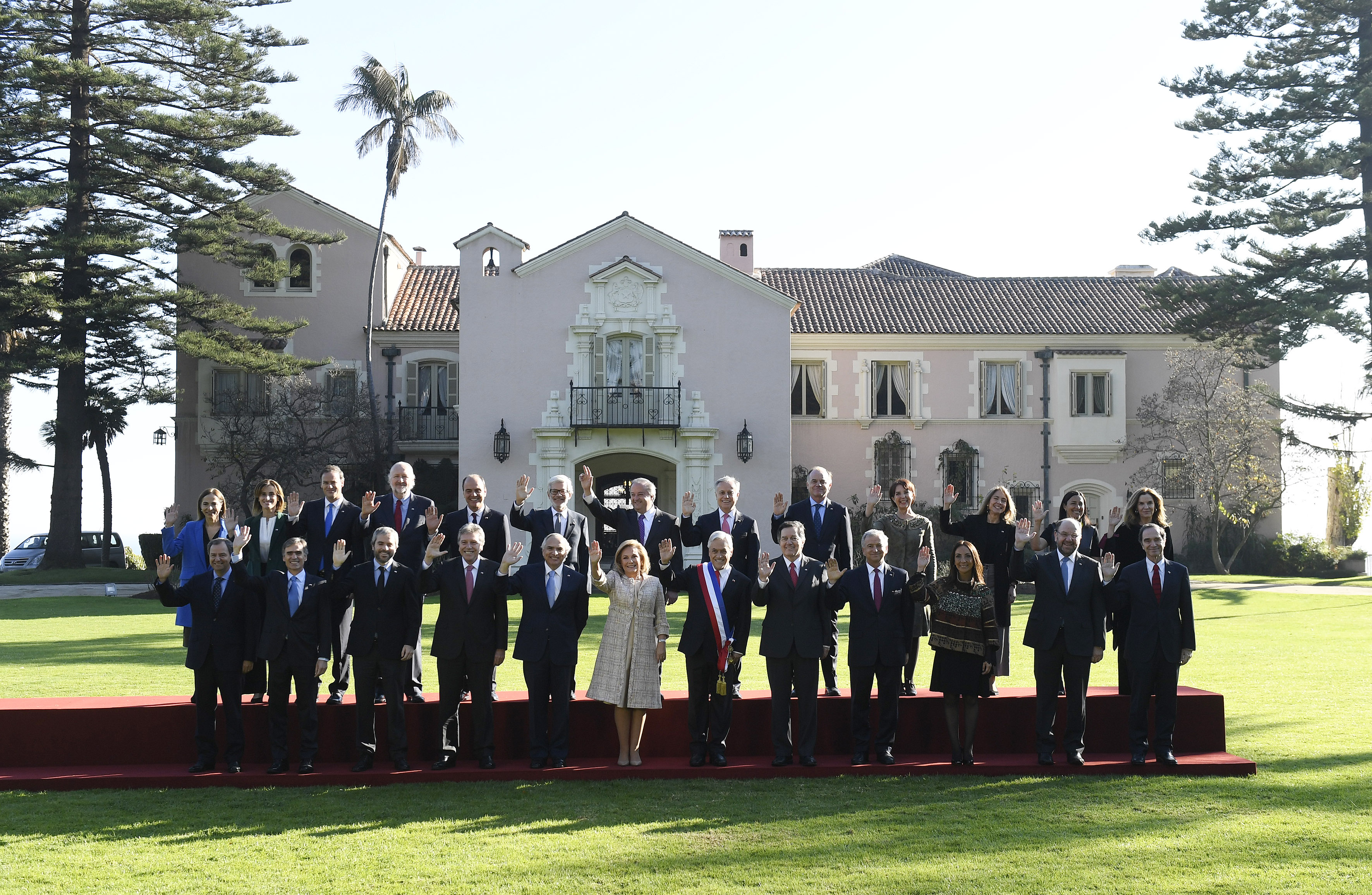
Piñera's original Cabinet during his second term.

In January 2018, Piñera unveiled his cabinet to harsh criticism: his interior minister, Andrés Chadwick, was a vocal supporter of the Pinochet dictatorship, which had previously appointed him president of the Catholic University Students Federation. In 2012 Chadwick expressed "deep repentance" for this support after discovering "over the years" serious human rights violations committed by the dictatorship, while defending the regime on other grounds.

Chadwick and justice minister Hernán Larraín were also "supporters and defenders of the secretive German enclave Colonia Dignidad, which was established by the fugitive Nazi officer and paedophile Paul Schäfer in the early 60s". Colonia Dignidad was used by Pinochet security officials to torture and murder opponents of the regime.

=== Immigration ===
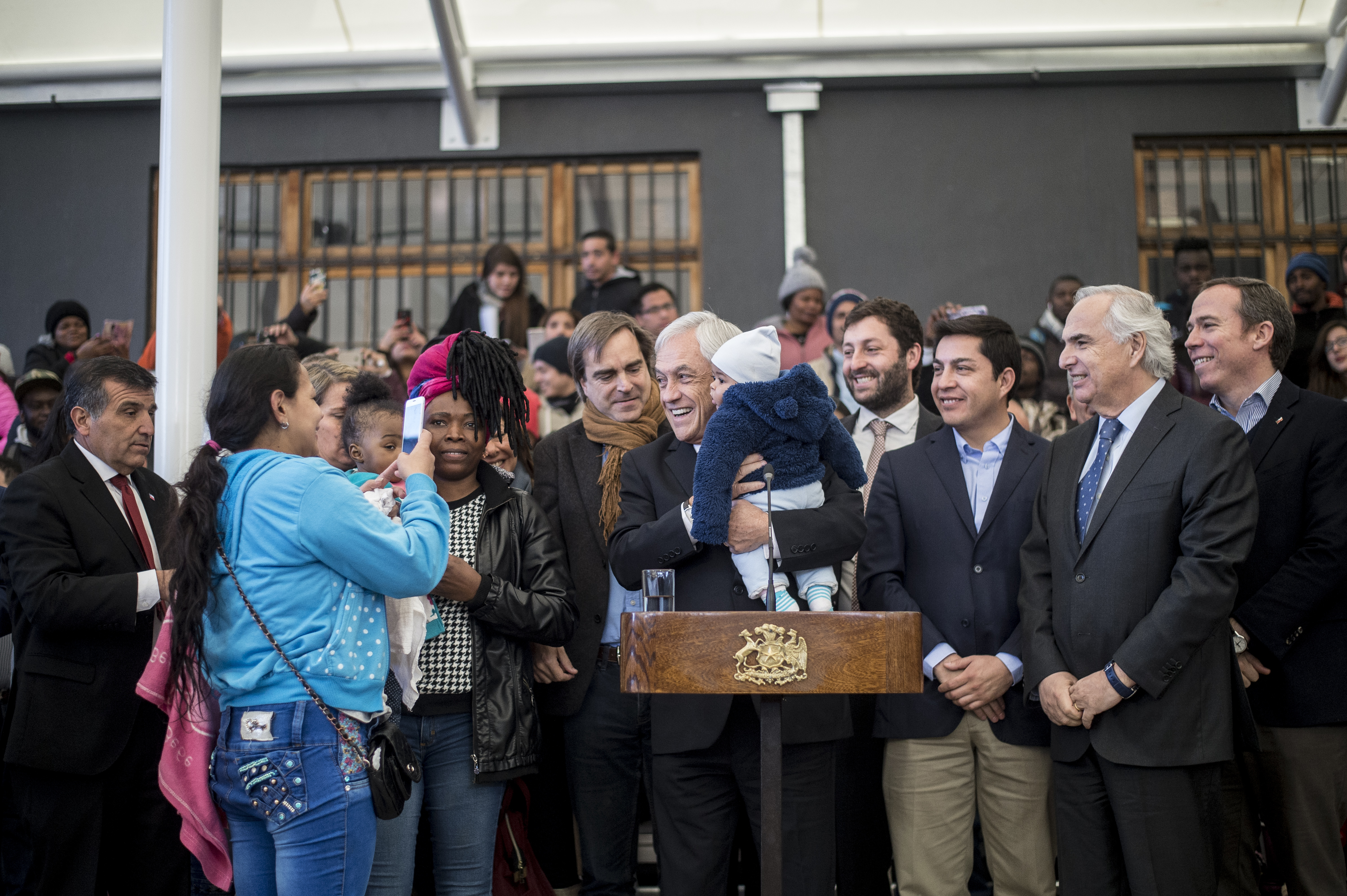
Sebastián Piñera in 2018 with immigrants after normalizing their migratory status.

In March 2018, just after taking office and during an interview with Deutsche Welle, the president expressed: "we are going to continue receiving Venezuelans in Chile, because we have a duty of solidarity and I never forget that when Chile lost its democracy, Venezuela was very generous with Chileans who were looking for new opportunities". However, Piñera's supporters pushed for new immigration regulation to avoid what they called a "Chilezuela" scenario.

On 9 April 2018, the president announced a new immigration law approved in 2019, thanks to which 300,000 illegal immigrants were regularized. The "Democratic Responsibility Visa" was created for Venezuelan immigrants in addition to the "Simple Consular Visa for Tourism" and the "Visa for Humanitarian Purposes" for Haitians, in order to regulate the immigration situation that was brought in by the previous government, but increasing it by legal means. In December 2018, the government announced that Chile would not sign the Global Compact for Migration, however, the government did sign the Global Compact on Refugees.

On 8 July 2019, the government's spokesperson, Cecilia Pérez, expressed that Venezuelans would continue to be allowed in "until the country resists it...That means being able to have the relevant demands to be able to attend to health, education, housing and work."

In mid-2019, as a result of the mass exodus of Venezuelans from their country, an immigration crisis emerged in the Chacalluta border complex, Senator Felipe Kast, a member of the government coalition, said that: "It is positive that the Government is implementing a policy orderly and humanitarian immigration; closing the borders to people with criminal records, and supporting children and women who seek to reunite with their relatives residing in Chile" and requested to "reach out to them" by directly managing that Venezuelans could carry out immigration procedures with their expired passport.

On 31 July 2019, Foreign Minister Teodoro Ribera signed an agreement with the resident coordinator of the United Nations System in Chile, Silvia Rucks, on collaboration on immigration and refuge.

=== Response to 2019–2020 Chilean protests ===
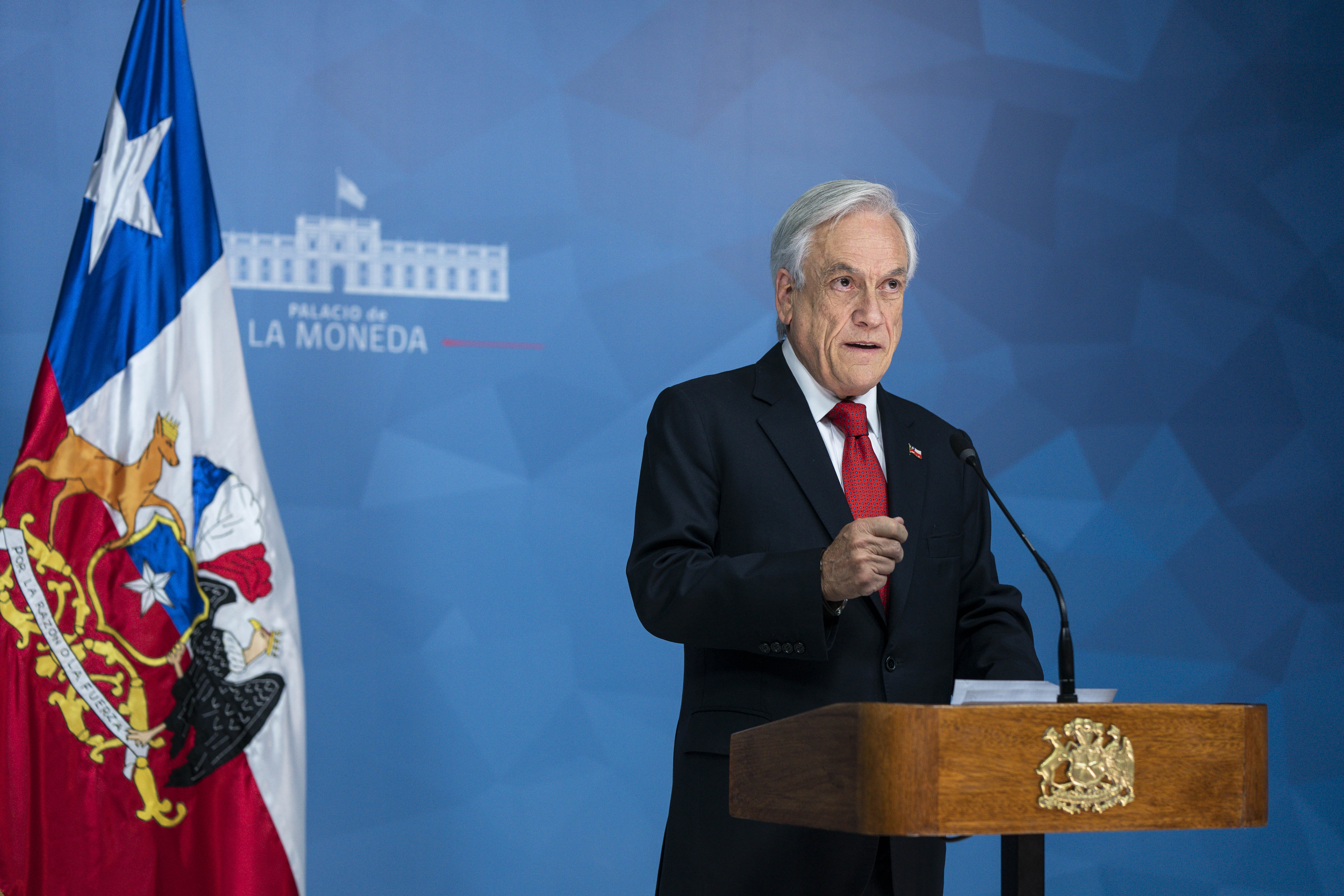
Piñera decreeing a State of Emergency during the political crisis in October 2019.

Following widespread protests that broke out across Chile in October 2019 and the burning of multiple subway stations in Santiago as well as public and private infrastructure destroyed throughout the country, President Piñera declared on 18 October that Chile was "at war with a powerful enemy" and declared a state of emergency, authorizing the deployment of the Chilean Army across the main regions to enforce order and prevent the destruction of public property, and invoked before the courts the Ley de Seguridad del Estado (State Security Law) against dozens of detainees. As a result, Piñera was criticized for his actions, resulting in an approval rate of 9% by 24 October, according to a poll by Active Research, although it increased to 13% by 1 June 2020, against 73% disapproval. This consistently low level of support was attributed to losing support from officials due to failure to restore order and enforce the rule of law.

On 15 November the Agreement for Peace was reached between many political parties agreeing the realization of the 2020 Chilean constitutional referendum, having the support of the president.

On 12 December 2019 the National Congress rejected an opposition-led motion to impeach him. The impeachment resolution accused him of "failing to protect human rights" in relation to the protests.

In response to the unrest, Piñera removed Chadwick as Interior and Public Security Minister on 28 October 2019 and replaced him with Gonzalo Blumel. On 11 December Chadwick was impeached for his role in the protests, including the many eye injuries attained by protesters. Chadwick was banned from holding public office for five years.

=== Response to COVID-19 pandemic ===
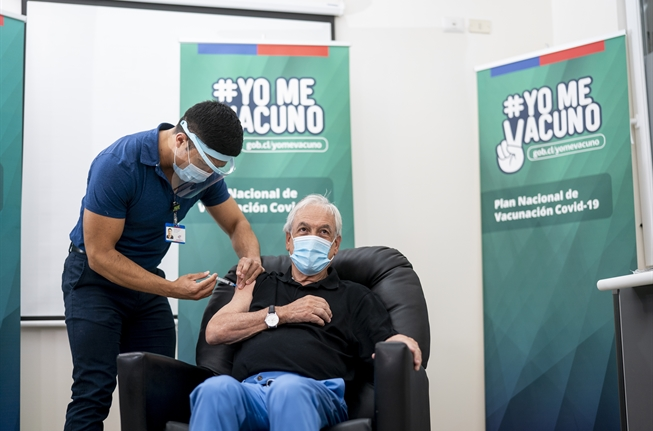
Piñera getting vaccinated.

As of 19 April 2021, Chile had recorded 1,131,340 cases of COVID-19 and 25,277 deaths from COVID-19, placing the country in the 50th and 31st places by total cases per million and total deaths per million respectively. In response, Piñera banned events with more than 500 people and issued lock-down orders in certain areas of the country, most notably the Santiago Metropolitan Region. Despite heavy criticism amidst the still ongoing political crisis, Chile managed to achieve one of the fastest vaccination rates worldwide.

Following the social unrest that erupted in late 2019, Piñera's diminished capacity to govern according to the principle of presidentialism led to claims that Chile was in a state of de facto parliamentarism or should become parliamentary. (Note: Other observers claim instead the Piñera administration had become increasingly presidential as result of the COVID-19 pandemic in Chile.)

=== Conflict in Araucanía ===
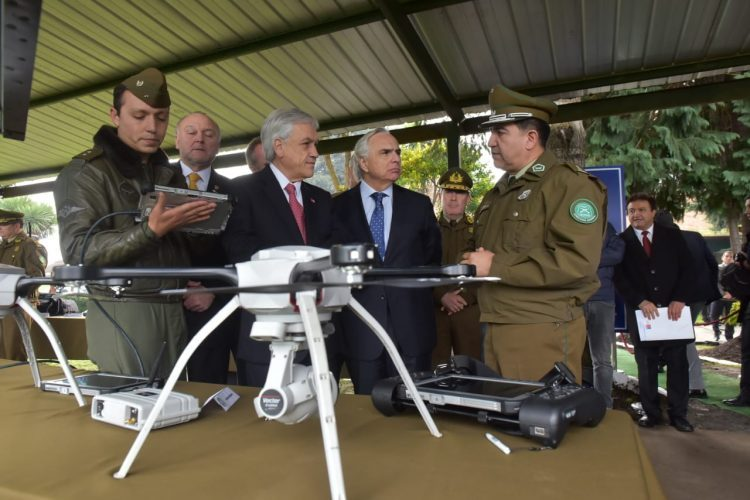
President Piñera presents the Carabineros Special Task Force Group against terrorism.

Piñera faced conflict in the Araucania region and nearby provinces, where Mapuche Indigenist groups demanded the ownership of lands that they consider "ancestral" and also consider that were taken over by large companies. Militants have carried out attacks and arson attacks on large logging operations, leading the Chilean government to declare a state of emergency in October 2021 and to militarise the region. Several civilians were killed as a result of law enforcement actions.

On 14 November 2018, the shooting of Camilo Catrillanca happened. Additionally, and within the context of the trial for the Luchsinger-Mackay case, a series of incidents developed in Araucanía, with riots, arson attacks, road blockades and other demonstrations in 2020.

On 9 February 2020, the trucker Juan Barrios was resting on the side of the road inside his vehicle when it was set on fire. He ended up with burns on 30% of his body and with his respiratory tract compromised. He died on 4 March 2020, and inspired the creation of a law bearing his name. The main objective of this bill is to increase criminal penalties for arson attacks on motor vehicles by modifying the Penal Code. In August and September 2020, several truck drivers' unions carried out a national strike alleging insecurity in the south of the country.

On 30 October 2020, the shooting of the Carabinero Eugenio Nain occurred. He was shot to death by an unidentified armed group in the Padre Las Casas commune.

=== Foreign affairs ===
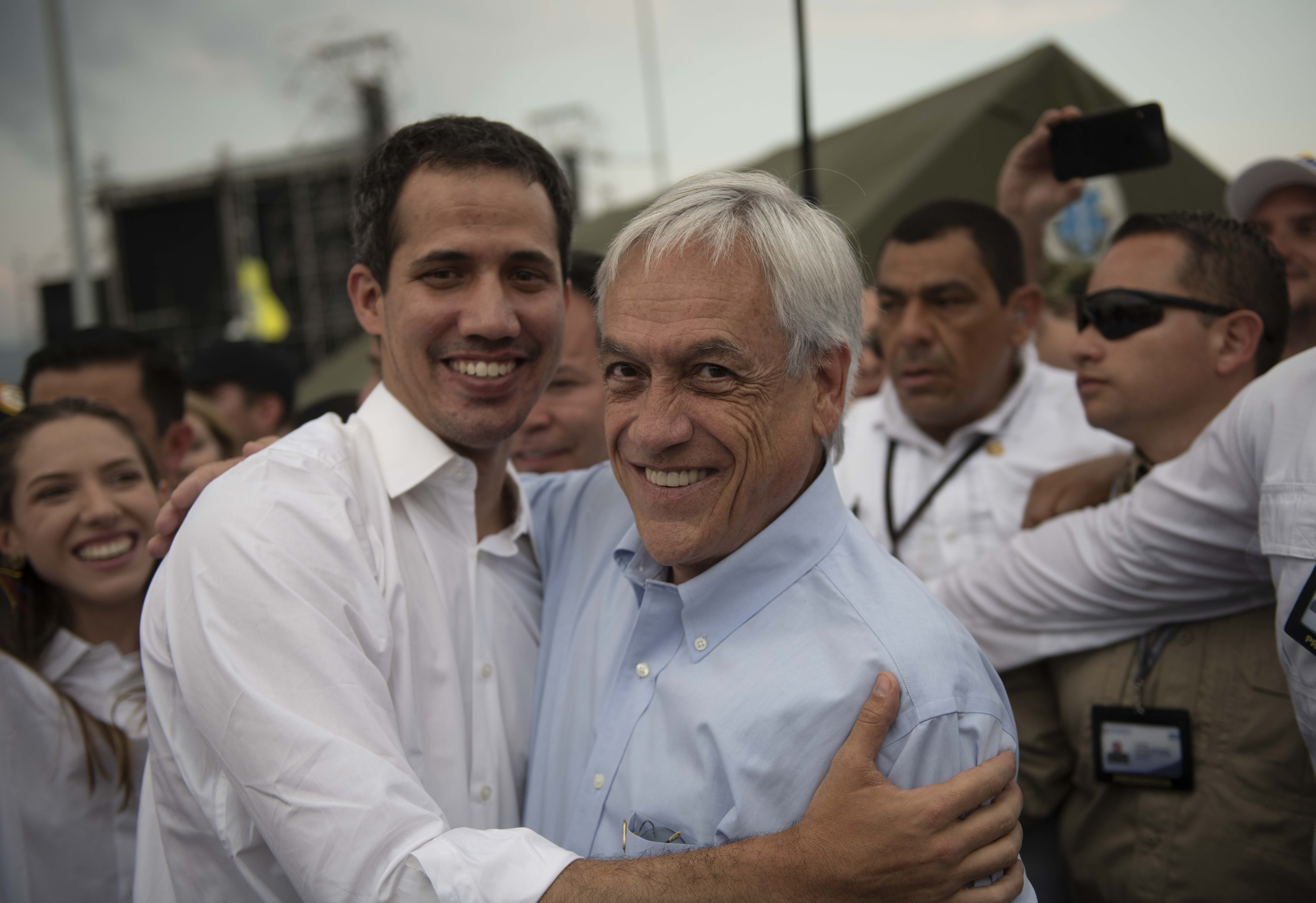
President Piñera with the Venezuelan opposition leader Juan Guaidó.

On 22 February 2019, Piñera met with Venezuelan opposition leader Juan Guaidó in Cúcuta, Colombia. President Piñera also attended the Venezuela Aid Live concert.

Sebastián Piñera showed closeness with Latin American leaders related to his political sector, such as Mauricio Macri, and has been critical of those who are not, especially with the Venezuelan government.

On 13 April, the executive attended the VIII Summit of the Americas, where he met with other leaders of the region.

On 11 May 2018, Argentina and Chile announced that they were working on the final stage of eliminating “roaming” between both countries.

On 1 October 2018, the ruling of the International Court of The Hague on the maritime case between Bolivia and Chile was read, which was favorable to Chile. The government celebrated the result along with the opposition and citizens.

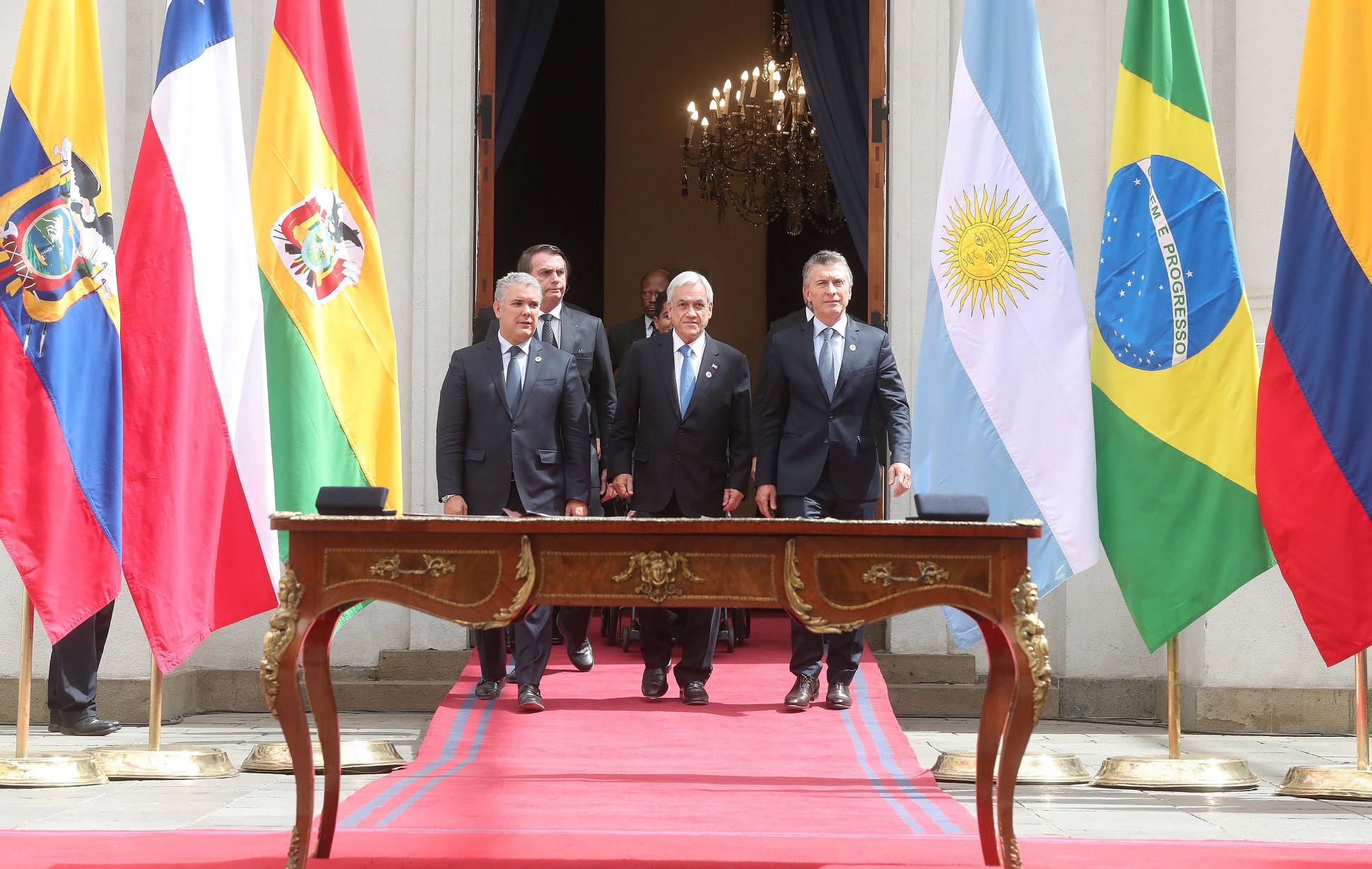
Signing of the Presidential Declaration on the Renewal and Strengthening of the Integration of South America at the Palacio de La Moneda (March 2019).

In March 2019, Chile hosted the first Meeting of Presidents of South America, which was part of the first Summit of the Forum for the Progress of South America (Prosur), a regional organization that was founded in said year as a proposal from the Chilean and Colombian presidents, Sebastián Piñera and Iván Duque.

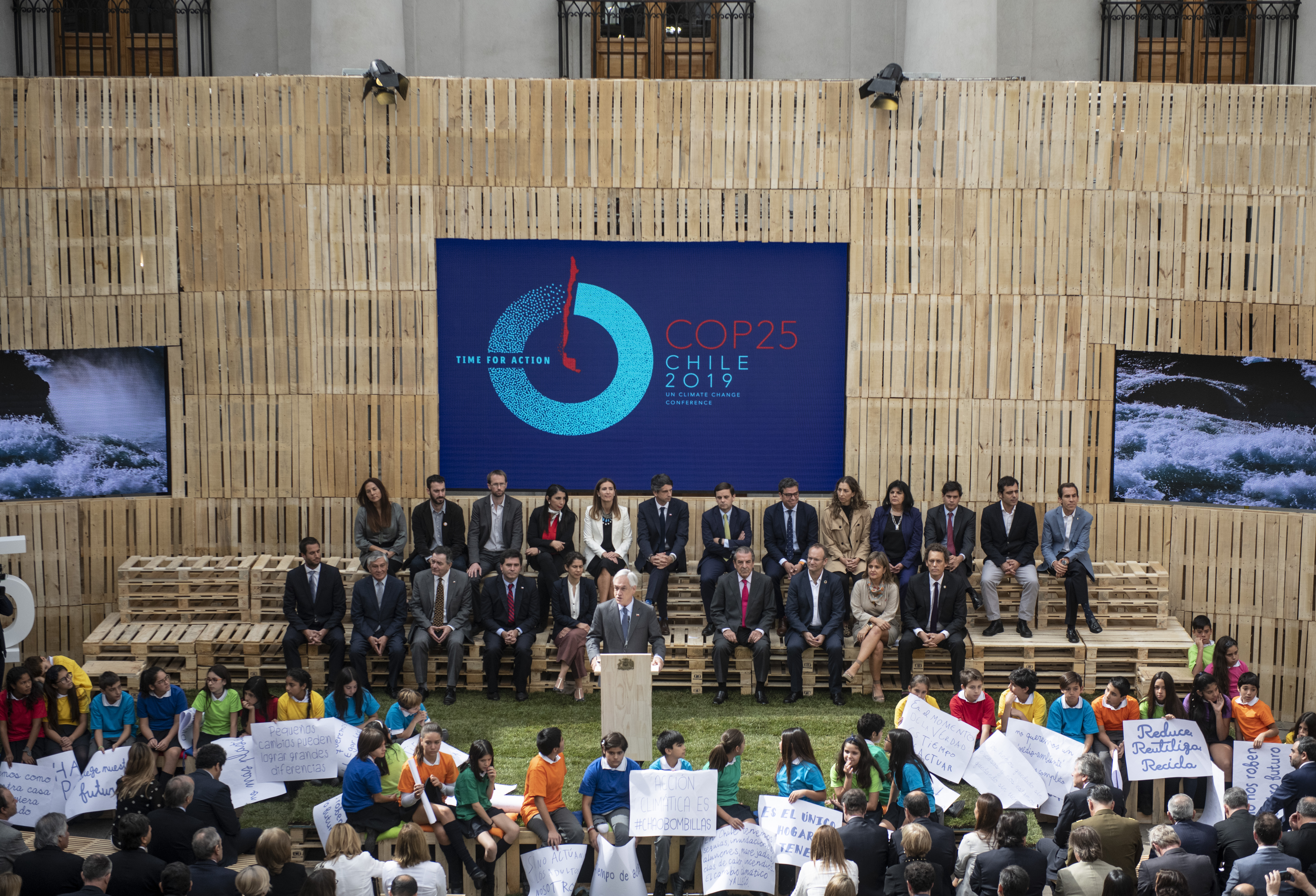
President Piñera leads the launch of COP 25 in April 2019.

During the government, the Escazú Agreement was not signed, despite having led its negotiations during the previous administration of Michelle Bachelet, alleging reasons of "national sovereignty" in abandoning the agreement. For the 2019 United Nations Climate Change Conference (COP25) was planned to be held in Chile along with the APEC summit, however, both events had to be canceled due to the political crisis at the end of the years, being the first reorganized in Madrid at the offer of the Pedro Sánchez government.

US President Donald Trump planned to sign an agreement with the People's Republic of China to end the trade war between China and the United States at the APEC event in Chile. President signed the Environmental Crimes Law in January 2019. Piñera also participated in the 2018 G20 Buenos Aires summit as a guest of Argentine President Mauricio Macri and in the 2019 G20 Osaka summit as President of APEC 2019.

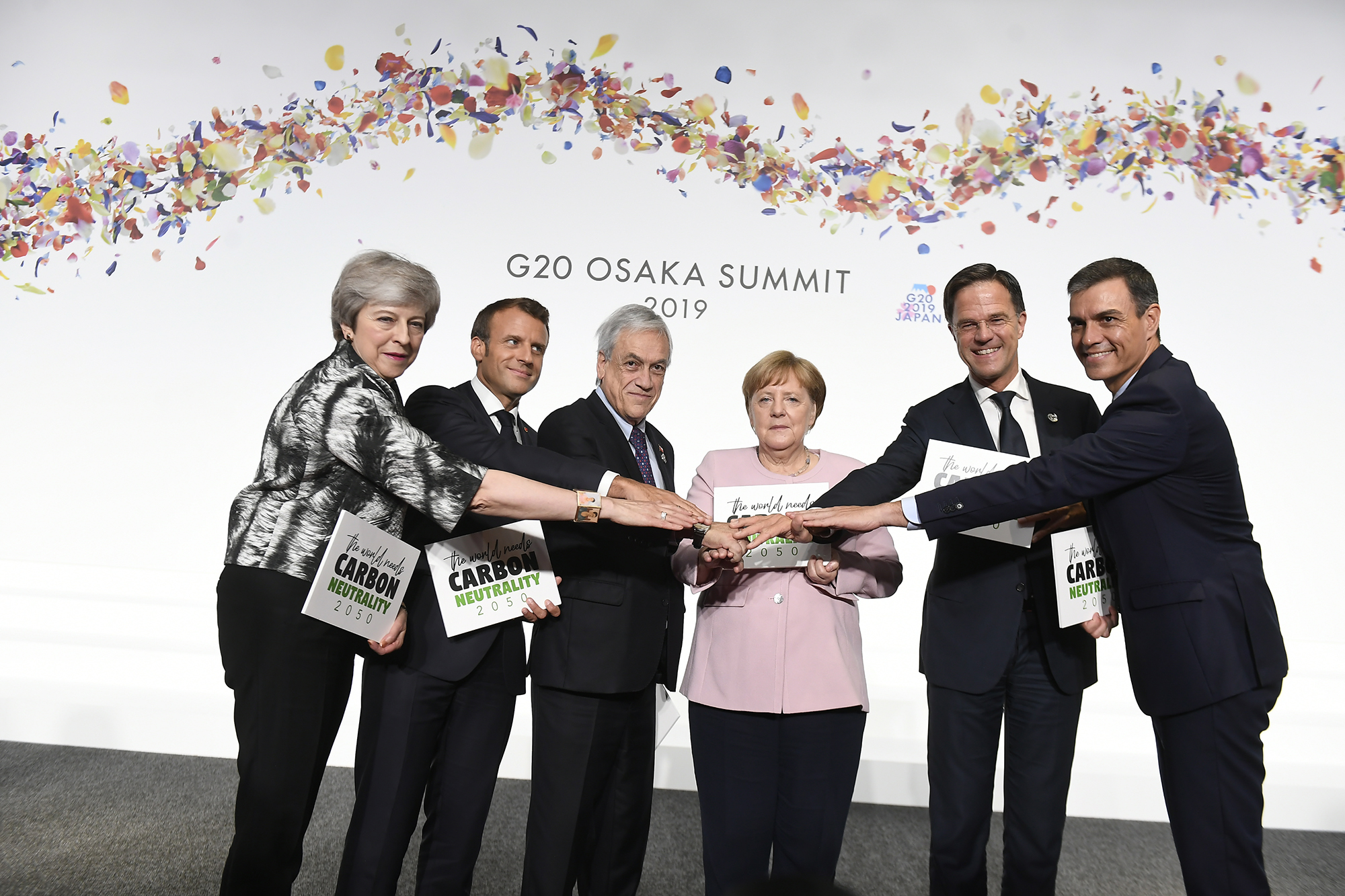
President Piñera at the 2019 G20 Osaka summit.

On 1 August, the government signed with the United Nations the United Nations Cooperation Framework for Sustainable Development 2019-2022, being the fourth document of this type to be prepared for Chile and the first to be adopted under the challenges of the 2030 Agenda and the 17 Sustainable Development Goals. Future government chancellors ratified the government's commitment to the implementation of the 2030 Agenda for Sustainable Development in Chile.

In 2021, Piñera authorized the chart SHOA N° 8 not to show the rectangle in the non-demarcated zone of the Southern Patagonian Ice Field with regards to the continental shelf claimed by Chile in the Sea of the Southern Zone. Until before the enacted decree, and also afterward on official Chilean maps and on tourist maps, Chilean maps show a rectangle clarifying that the boundary was not demarcated according to the 1998 agreement. In the map of Piñera's decree of 23 August of that year, it was not shown as such and the cartography prior to 1998 was used. Both countries consider that they have about a thousand kilometers more ice than the other, which is reflected in the cartographic difference in the Southern Patagonian Ice Field dispute.

=== Pandora Papers ===
In the Pandora Papers leak of 3 October 2021, Piñera was named in the revealed documents. According to the Spanish newspaper El País, Chilean media organizations CIPER and LaBot allegedly documented that Piñera was involved in "particularly controversial activity". According to reports, Piñera took money from a prominent mining executive in exchange for government support for Minera Dominga – a controversial mining investment project located in an environmentally sensitive area. The mining executive in question is Piñera's childhood friend Carlos Alberto Délano of Andes Iron.

El País wrote:

In December 2010, when Piñera had been in the presidential residence, La Moneda Palace, for just nine months, the presidential family sold the business to Délano with a deed signed in Chile for $14 million and another in the Virgin Islands for $138 million. The amount was to be paid in three installments, with a caveat: the last payment was conditional on there not being environmental protection imposed on the mining operations area, as environmental groups were demanding. The decision on the viability of Minera Dominga was left in the hands of the Piñera government, which failed to promote environmental protection, so the third installment was finally paid.

According to Infobae, Piñera's family and other investors allegedly made a 1,000% profit over an eighteen-month period on the project that required approval from Piñera's government.

In response, Piñera's business manager said that Piñera had not been in control of his own companies for about twelve years and that he was not aware of the sale of Minera Dominga to Délano.

=== Impeachment ===
As a consequence of the leaked information by the Pandora Papers; a formal impeachment was launched against him. On 9 November 2021, the Chamber of Deputies passed the impeachment and it then moved to the Senate, where a two-thirds vote is needed to remove a sitting president. On 16 November 2021, the Senate voted against removing Piñera from office, ending the impeachment process.

== Second post-presidency (2022–2024) ==
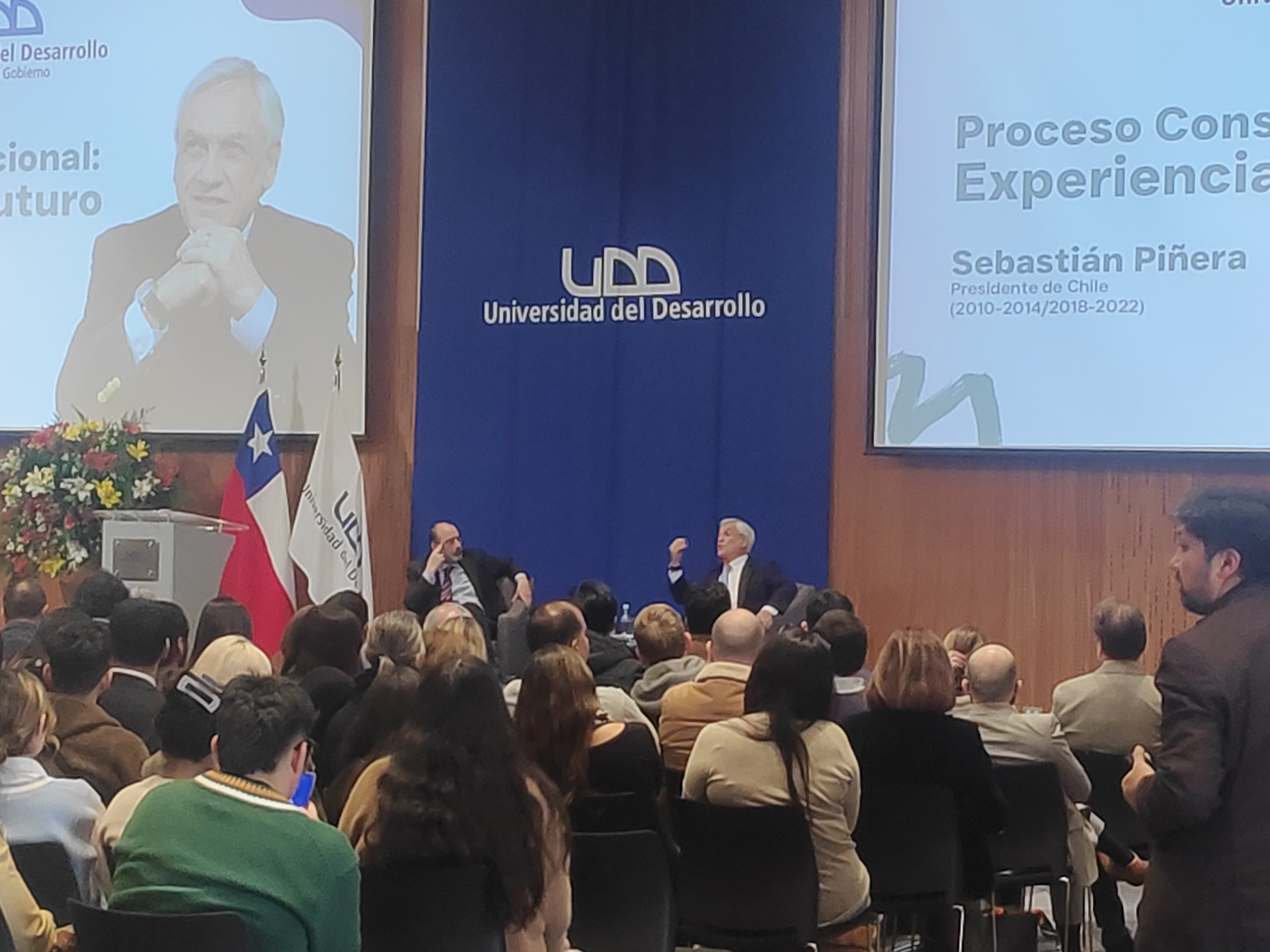
Former President Sebastián Piñera in 2023 in the University for Development.

During 2022 Piñera kept a low public profile, keeping silent during the first months of Boric's government and during the campaign for the constitutional plebiscite of 2022, something that would gradually change and in mid 2023 he began to participate publicly in politics again.

During an interview in 2023 he ruled out a third term candidacy, saying that "I want to be a good former president. And what a good former president does is contribute to unity, to improve the level of debate, to favor dialogue and agreements, to denounce bad ideas - those that harm the country - to promote good ideas and, now, I want to become a person who puts his weight behind great causes". He also had a surge in popularity in the polls and President Boric himself began to call him "a democrat".

At the same time, he continued to actively participate in politics, proposing a simile of the Concertación, but ranging from the centrist Amarillos to the hard-right Republican Party. He also criticized Boric saying that: "He is not leading the country on the right path."

That same year he spoke about the political crisis of 2019 saying "the left did not condemn the violence and sought to overthrow the president" and that "it was a non-traditional coup d'état."

Furthermore, in the context of the 50th anniversary of the 1973 coup, he stated that "Allende's government did not respect the principles of democracy." He also signed the letter made by President Boric together with the other Former Presidents entitled "For democracy, always", challenging his Chile Vamos coalition. He also met with Boric in La Moneda on the first day of the month.

He supported Javier Milei's successful presidential campaign in the 2023 Argentine general election.

In the 2023 Chilean constitutional referendum he voted in favor, and also expressed at the end of 2023 that Evelyn Matthei would be the "best presidential figure" in his political sector.

In both 2023 and 2024, Piñera made his administration's work team available to coordinate aid for the victims of the 2024 wildfires with the government of Gabriel Boric, with whom he had phone calls days before his death.

== Public image ==
Since the return to democracy in 1990 Piñera has been the president with the lowest approval rating in polls. According to diplomat and political scientist Carlos Huneeus, Piñera showed himself well-prepared in his public appearances with a good command of relevant facts, yet he failed to show empathy. In an interview with Cristián Warnken, Piñera acknowledged he had difficulties in expressing his feelings. In April 2012, The Economist described Piñera as being considered an "inept politician" by both the opposition and supporters. (Note: The Chilean government responded by stating that The Economist's comment was disrespectful.)

Piñera's supporters form a cross-party centre-right and right-wing faction called Piñerism. In his second post-presidency he had a surge in popularity in the polls; also, his successor, President Boric, has called Piñera "a democrat", a view shared by other former presidents.

=== Jokes and informal style ===
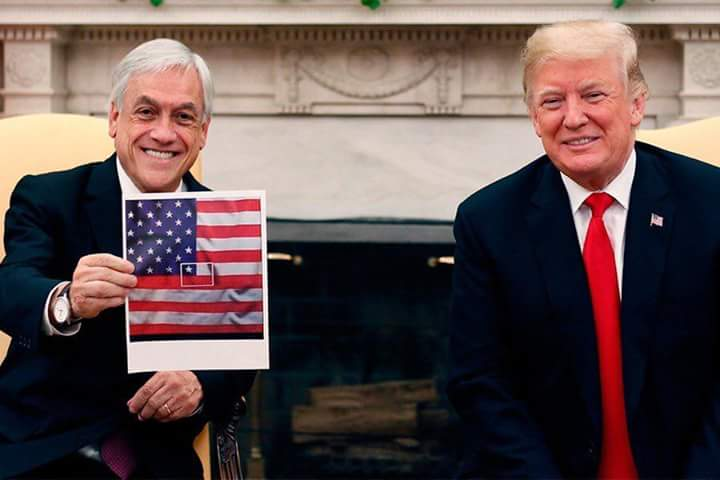
Piñera showing Trump a sign with the Chilean flag inside the American one.

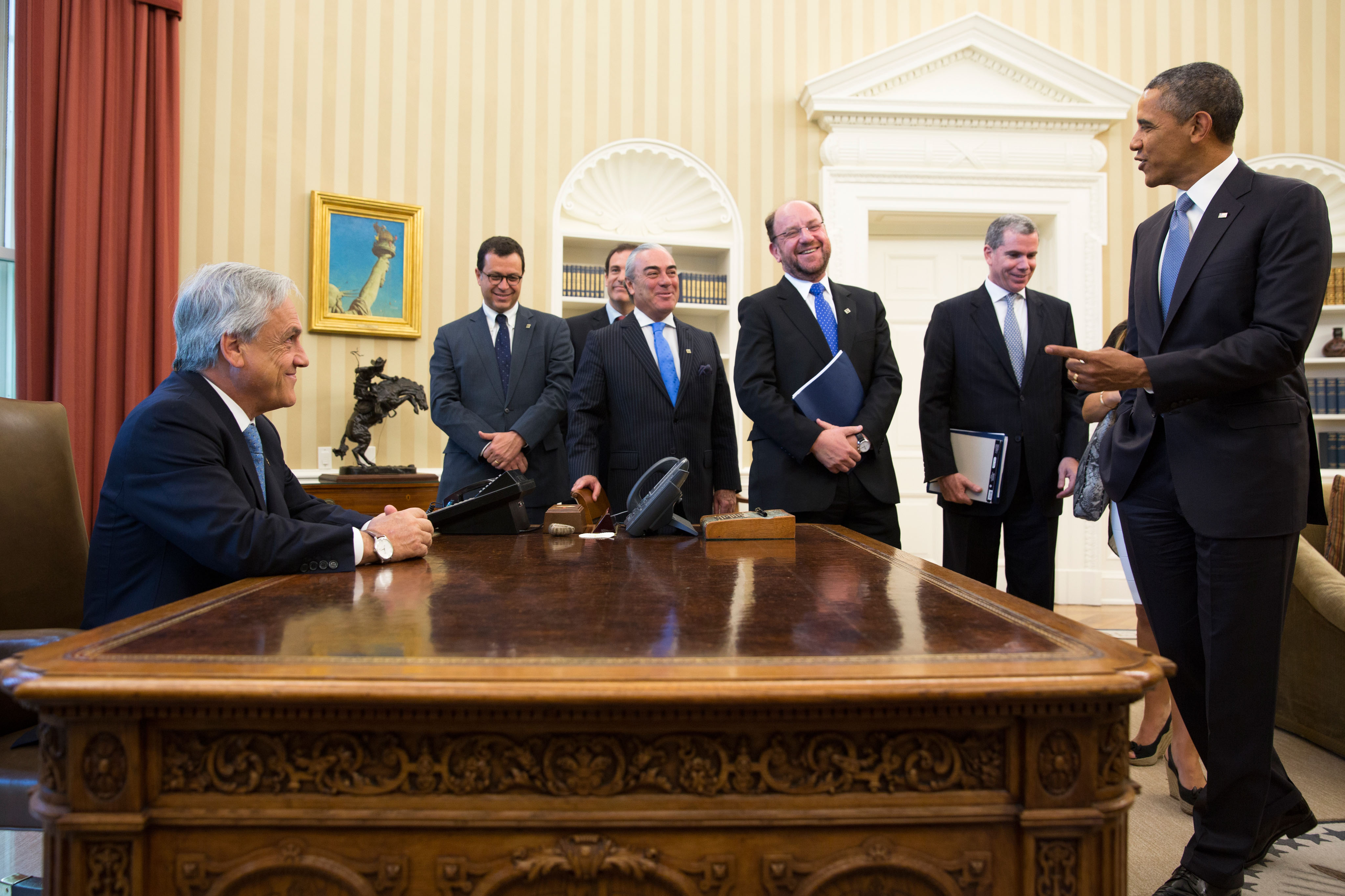
President Piñera sitting at the Oval Office Resolute Desk alongside President Barack Obama.

Many of Piñera's jokes were, according to diplomat and political scientist Oscar Godoy, attempts to gain sympathy.

In December 2011, during a state visit to Mexico, a joke made by Piñera where he compared women with politicians caused uproar in Chile, sparking criticism from his own minister Carolina Schmidt who said of the joke that it was "[hurtful] to many women". In the joke, Piñera said that "when a lady says 'no' it means maybe, when she says maybe it means yes and when she says yes she is not a lady." The Chilean Network Against Domestic and Sexual Violence called the joke "misogynistic" and "a shame for the whole country". Previously on a state visit to Peru in 2011, Piñera received criticism for his informal style after he revealed to Peruvian president-elect Ollanta Humala that he was a descendant of the Inca Huayna Capac. Senator Jorge Pizarro criticized Piñera's comment to Ollanta Humala, calling for more careful and respectful attitudes.

In June 2013, after visiting U.S. President Obama in the White House, he said, "I'm going to sit at the President of the United States' desk", breaking the White House's political protocols. Alfredo Moreno Charme, Minister of Foreign Affairs, said "How many other presidents have done the same?" and Obama responded, "This is the only one," causing laughter between those there. Piñera then justified his abrupt actions by stating his daughter was born in the United States.

=== Bad luck and ridicule ===
Piñera was often publicly associated with bad luck. The BBC listed a series of situations of "bad luck" concerning Piñera's presidency: the 2010 Maule earthquake followed by another quake during Piñera's inauguration ceremony, the Copiapó mining accident of 2010, the 2010 Santiago prison fire, the 2011 Puyehue-Cordón Caulle eruption and the 2012 Araucanía wildfires. His lapses, errors and inconveniences were labelled "piñericosas" in Chile. Carlos Peña was deeply critical of Piñera's failed public appearances, calling his improvised visit to Plaza Baquedano, the epicenter of the 2019–2020 protests, in April 2020 an act of "provocation and contempt" and "narcissism bordering on evil" (Spanish: narcicismo cercano a lo maligno).

Chilean impressionist Stefan Kramer recurrently personified Piñera since at least 2010. This initially caused some displeasure in the Government, which filed a complaint in 2010 to the National Television Council regarding what they saw as a disrespectful portrayal. In 2011, Kramer again personified Piñera, alongside his brother Miguel, in the Teletón charity event while Piñera was present in the audience. Judging the situation, journalist Fernando Paulsen said Piñera acted correctly by letting the imitation pass, while claiming anything else would have been seen as an abuse of authority. Afterwards, organizers were concerned that they put the president in an really uncomfortable position, and Kramer chose to not personify Piñera for the 2012 Teletón. However, earlier in 2012, Piñera had been ridiculed again by Kramer in the blockbuster film Stefan versus Kramer. In the movie, Piñera was portrayed as a Machiavellian politician, and was mocked among other things for his real-life impasse with the highly popular football coach Marcelo Bielsa. Some pundits argued, however, that the portrayal may not be merely negative but could have the effect of humanizing him before the public.

José Mujica, president of Uruguay, stated Piñera's low approval ratings might have being caused by a lack of "glamour".

=== Use of bellicose rhetoric ===
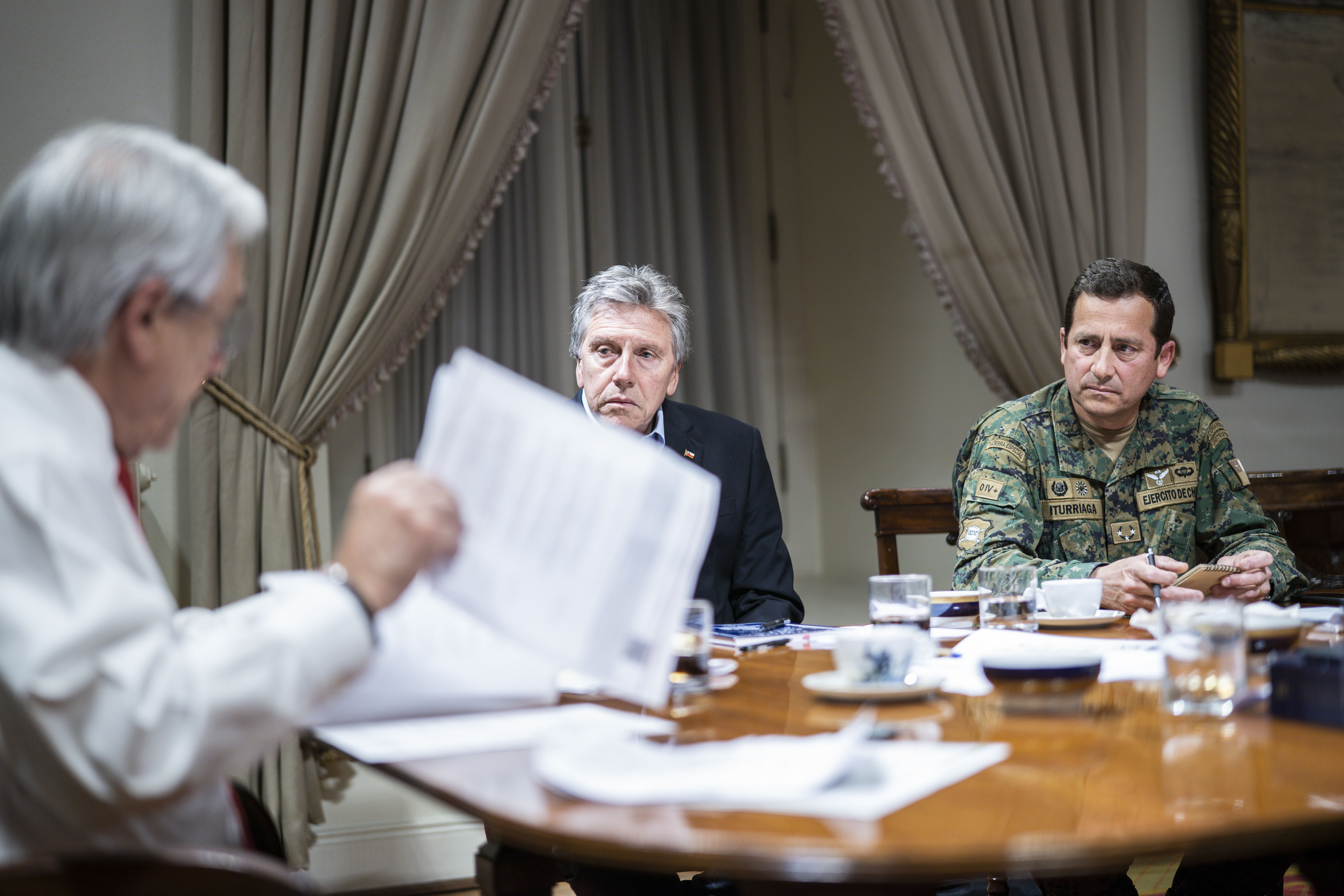
President Piñera with Minister Alberto Espina and the head of National Defense for the Metropolitan Region Javier Iturriaga del Campo.

During the 2019–20 Chilean protests Piñera made himself known for the use of bellicose language. When Piñera addressed the nation on the evening of 20 October during the height of the unrest he remarked that the country was "at war with a powerful and relentless enemy" and announced that the state of emergency would be extended across much of the country. Some opposition politicians described his rhetoric as "irresponsible", while a Latin America editor for BBC News Online expressed concern about the impact his words would have on the protesters and on the chances for meaningful dialogue. Hours shortly after the President's speech, chief of national defense Javier Iturriaga del Campo appeared to contradict this declaration, asserting that he was "content" and "not at war with anyone".

However, the use of bellicose rhetoric can be traced back to at least 2018 when Piñera began his second government. He referred to a variety of subjects like drug trafficking, terrorism, and organized crime as "powerful and relentless enemies". Besides this Piñera made frequent use of words like "battle", "conquest", "defeat" and "combat" in his verbal communication. The use of such language is not unique to Piñera but has also been heard from European right-wing populists and George W. Bush. According to economist Carlos Tromben who studied Piñera's political discourse, the aim of this rhetoric was to rally the nation behind what was perceived as a common interest, but the success of this was variable. Tromben also views the bellicose rhetoric as a defensive communicational strategy aimed to gain time for a "counterattack".

== Personal life ==
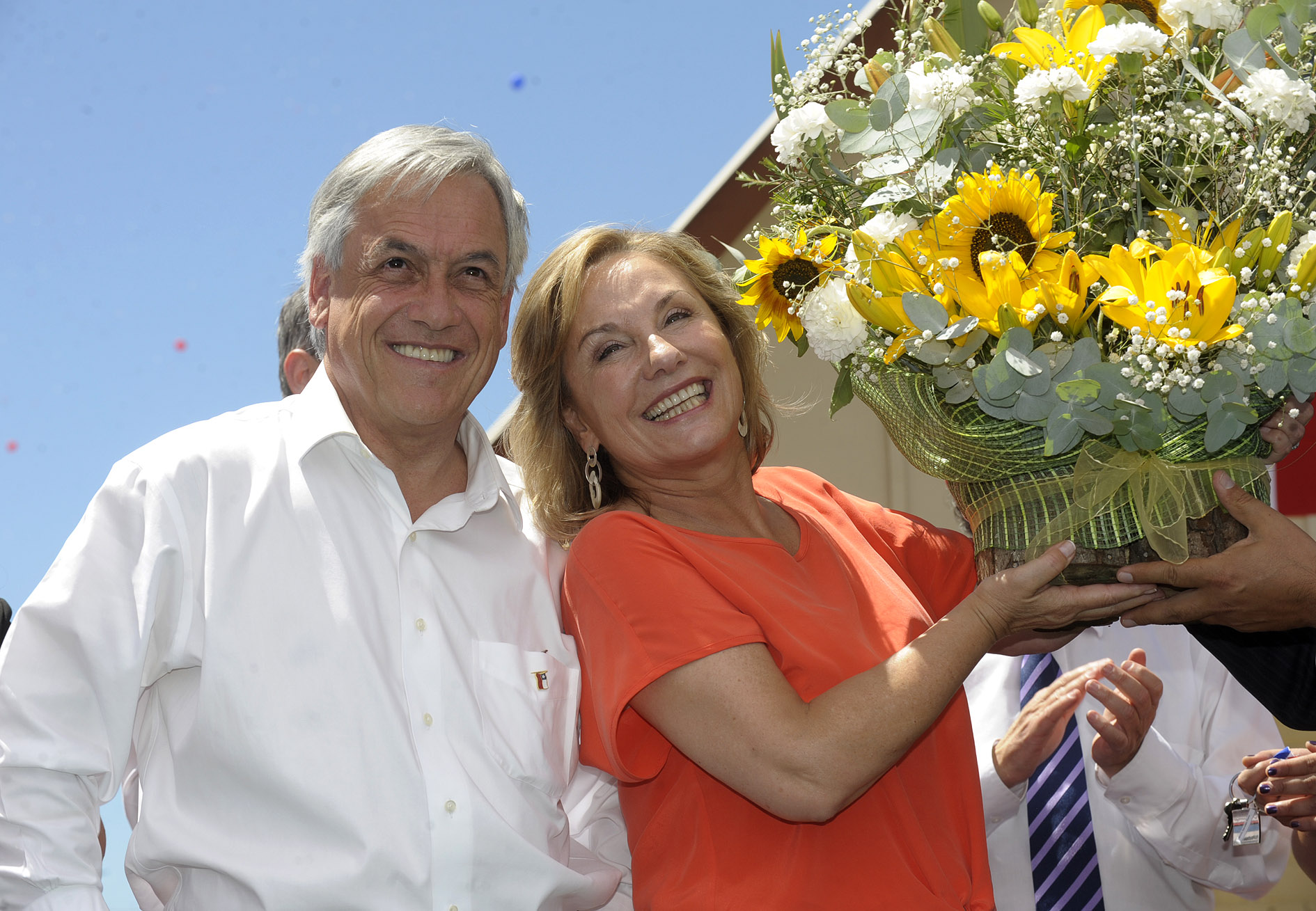
Piñera and Morel in February 2012

Piñera married Cecilia Morel in 1973. They were neighbors on Avenida Américo Vespucio in Santiago. They had four children, born in 1975, 1978, 1982, and 1984.

Piñera was also a member of the Inter-American Dialogue, a Washington, D.C.–based think tank.

== Death and funeral ==
Map of the Lake Ranco helicopter crash in which Sebastián Piñera died

At 2:47 p.m. Chile Summer Time (UTC−3) on 6 February 2024, a few minutes after take-off, the Robinson R44 helicopter (Registration CC-PHP) that Piñera was piloting crashed nose-first into Lake Ranco in the province of El Ranco in Los Rios Region. The helicopter crashed about 40 m from the southern shore of the lake at Ilihue, east of the town of Lago Ranco. Piñera had a summer house near Coique, 42 km (26 mi) from the crash site on the opposite side of the lake. At the time of the crash there had been a strong storm in the area. According to La Nación, he survived the crash itself but the impact left him unconscious and unable to remove his safety belt, resulting in his drowning. The other three people on board were his sister Magdalena and businessman Miguel Ignacio Guerrero with his son Bautista Guerrero, all of whom survived. His body was subsequently retrieved by the Chilean Navy from a depth of 28 m (92 ft).

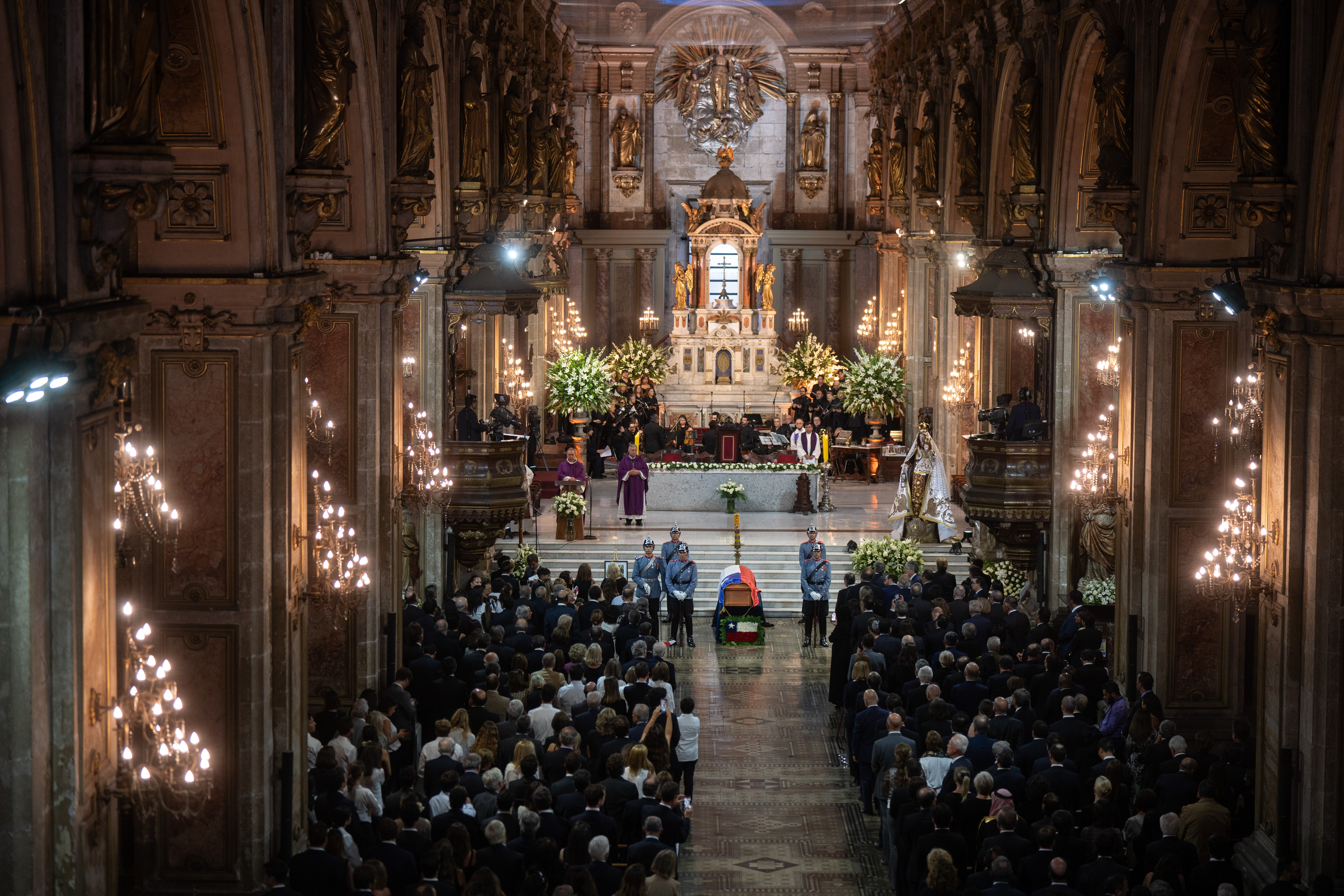
Funeral mass of Sebastián Piñera at Santiago Metropolitan Cathedral

In an address from La Moneda Palace later that evening, President Gabriel Boric declared three days of national mourning and announced that Piñera would be given a state funeral to be organized by foreign minister Alberto van Klaveren. Tatiana Rivera, the regional attorney for Los Rios, said that Piñera's body would be transported to Valdivia for an autopsy. Following its completion, his body was transferred to a base of the Chilean Air Force in Santiago Air Base, then transported to the Former National Congress of Chile building in Santiago, where it lay in state. A private ceremony for the family was held on the morning of 7 February, after which the public was allowed to enter the building. On 9 February, Piñera's body was transported to Santiago Metropolitan Cathedral for a requiem mass officiated by Archbishop Fernando Chomalí Garib. President Boric, along with former presidents Michelle Bachelet, Eduardo Frei Ruiz-Tagle, and President of Senate Juan Antonio Coloma gave speeches. Piñera's body was then transported to La Moneda for a eulogy by President Boric, to be later taken to the Parque del Recuerdo for burial.

== Styles, honours and arms ==
Presidential styles of Sebastián Piñera Echenique
- Reference style: His Excellency
- Spoken style: Your Excellency
- Alternative style: Mr. President

=== National honours ===
- Grand-Master (2010–2014 and 2018–2022) and Collar of the Order of Merit
- Grand-Master (2010–2014 and 2018–2022) and Collar of the Order of Bernardo O'Higgins

=== Foreign honours ===
- Brazil: Grand Collar of the Order of the Southern Cross (9 April 2010)
- Colombia: Grand Collar of the Order of Boyacá (24 November 2010)
- Peru: Grand Cross with Diamonds of the Order of the Sun (25 November 2010)
- Spain: Collar of the Order of Isabella the Catholic (4 March 2011)
- Palestine: Order of the Star of Palestine (5 March 2011)
- Mexico: Collar of the Order of the Aztec Eagle (7 July 2011)
- Panama: Collar of the Order of Manuel Amador Guerrero (5 June 2013)
- Norway: Grand Cross of the Order of Saint Olav (27 March 2019)
- Paraguay: Collar of the National Order of Merit (28 September 2021)

=== Arms ===
As Grand Master of the Chilean Order of Merit
(Attributed)

== In popular culture ==
Actor Bob Gunton portrays Piñera in the 2015 film The 33, directed by Patricia Riggen.

== Notes ==
Senate of Chile
New constituency	Senator for Eastern Santiago; 1990–1998	Succeeded by Carlos Bombal
Party political offices
Preceded by Alberto Cardemil	Leader of National Renewal; 2001–2004	Succeeded by Sergio Díez
Preceded by Joaquín Lavín	National Renewal nominee for President of Chile; 2005–2006, 2009–2010	Succeeded by Evelyn Matthei
Preceded by Joaquín Lavín	Alliance for Chile nominee for President of Chile; 2005–2006, 2009–2010	Succeeded by Evelyn Matthei
New alliance	Chile Vamos nominee for President of Chile; 2017	Succeeded by Sebastián Sichel
Political offices
Preceded by Michelle Bachelet	President of Chile; 2010–2014	Succeeded by Michelle Bachelet
Preceded by Michelle Bachelet	President of Chile; 2018–2022	Succeeded by Gabriel Boric
Diplomatic posts
New office	President pro tempore of PROSUR; 2019–2020	Succeeded by Iván Duque
Preceded by Peter O'Neill	Chair of the Asia-Pacific Economic Cooperation; 2019	Succeeded by Muhyiddin Yassin
