= Carlos Huneeus =

Chilean professor and diplomat

Carlos Huneeus Madge (born 1947, in Santiago, Chile) is a Chilean university professor and diplomat. He is since August 2003 professor in Instituto de Estudios Internacionales in the University of Chile and the general director of Instituto de Sondeo de Opinión in Centro de Estudios de la Realidad Contemporánea.
