= Karen Poniachik =

Chilean journalist and politician (1965–2022)

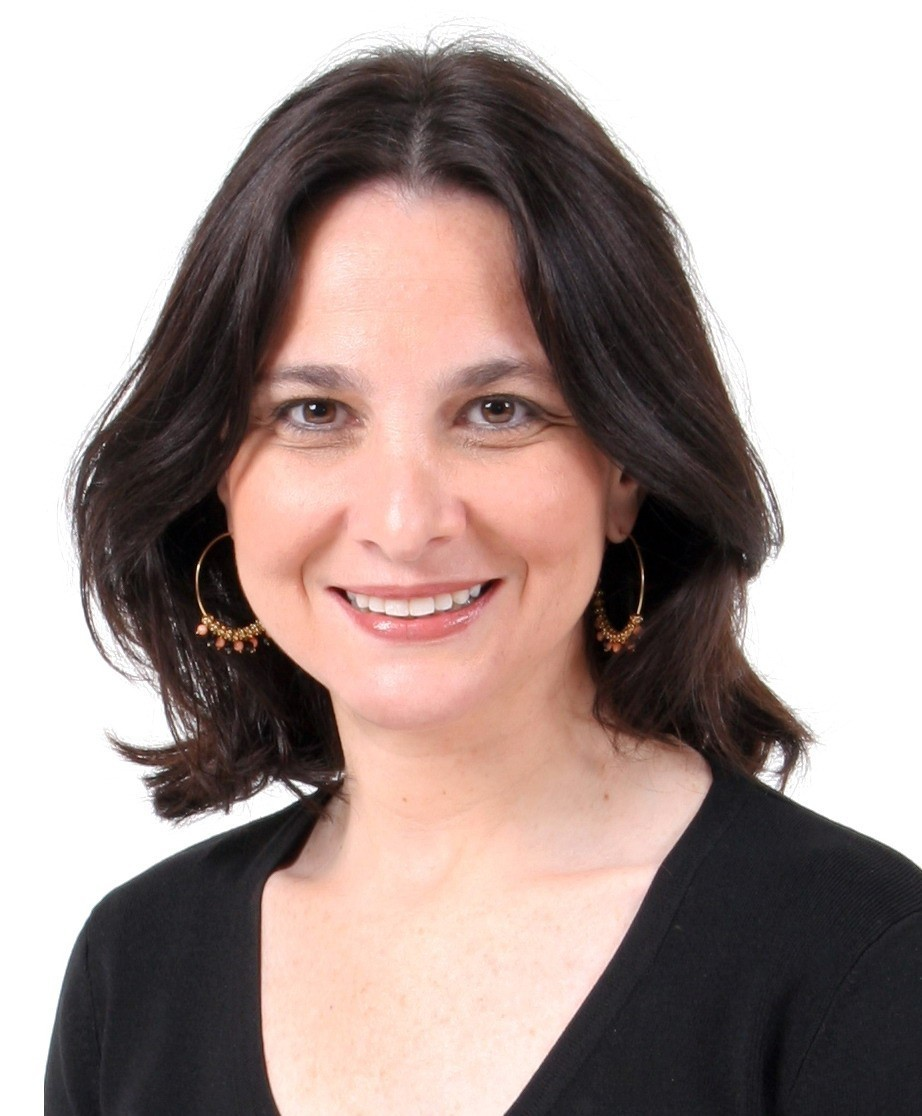
- Poniachik in 2007

Minister of Mining
- In office 11 March 2006 – 8 January 2008
- President: Michelle Bachelet
- Preceded by: Alfonso Dulanto Rencoret
- Succeeded by: Santiago González Larraín

Minister of Energy
- In office 11 March 2006 – 26 March 2007
- President: Michelle Bachelet
- Preceded by: Marcelo Tokman
- Succeeded by: Jorge Rodríguez Grossi

Personal details
- Born: Karen Paulina Poniachik Pollak; 20 April 1965 Santiago, Chile
- Died: 12 October 2022 (aged 57) Santiago, Chile
- Occupation: Journalist, consultant, politician

Karen Paulina Poniachik Pollak (20 April 1965 – 12 October 2022) was a Chilean journalist, consultant, and politician. She served as Minister of Mining and as Minister of Energy during the first government of President Michelle Bachelet.

Poniachik was born in Santiago on 20 April 1965. Her grandparents were Jews who came to Chile from Romania and Poland to escape the Nazi siege that was beginning to feel strong in Europe in the early 1930s. Once in the South American country they devoted themselves to commercial and industrial activities. Poniachik's father was an active entrepreneur who went through various activities, such as industrial, textile and financial field. Her mother was a housewife who, after having four children, studied law.

Poniachik lived with her family in the Chilean capital until the arrival of the leftist Popular Unity to power in 1970, when they decided to immigrate to the United States. They returned home shortly before the coup of September 1973. She died on 12 October 2022, at the age of 57.

== Family and education ==
She was born in Santiago, Chile, on 20 April 1965, the granddaughter of Jewish immigrants who arrived in Chile from Romania and Poland, fleeing the growing threat of National Socialism in Europe during the early 1930s. After settling in Chile, her family became involved in commercial and manufacturing activities. Her father was an entrepreneur active in a range of sectors, including manufacturing, textiles, and finance, while her mother was a homemaker who later studied law after raising her four children.

She lived with her family in the Chilean capital until the election of the left-wing Popular Unity coalition in 1970, when they decided to emigrate to the United States. The family returned to Chile shortly before the 1973 Chilean coup d'état.

She completed her primary and secondary education at The Grange School, Santiago. She later earned a degree in journalism from the Pontifical Catholic University of Chile in 1987 and obtained a master's degree in international relations from Columbia University in New York City, United States, in 1990.

At the age of thirty-five, she was diagnosed with breast cancer, a disease she successfully overcame through radiation treatment. At forty-four, she became the mother of a daughter, Ana Victoria. As a single mother, she later arranged for her daughter to bear her surnames in reversed order (Pollak Poniachik) through a legal modification registered with the Civil Registry.

== Professional career ==
Professionally, she worked as an international political analyst for ECO/Televisa between 1990 and 1995. During the same period, she also served as a correspondent in New York for Canal 13 and the magazine Cosas.

From 1995 to 2000, she was Director of Corporate Programs at the Council of the Americas in New York. She also worked as a consultant for private companies and for Chile's Ministry of Foreign Affairs and Ministry of Finance.

During the administration of President Ricardo Lagos, she served as Executive Vice President of Chile's Foreign Investment Committee (CEI) from March 2000 to March 2006.

== Political career ==
On 11 March 2006, President Michelle Bachelet appointed her as a dual cabinet minister, serving simultaneously as Minister of Mining and head of the National Energy Commission (CNE). As Minister of Mining, she also chaired the boards of the state-owned enterprises Codelco, ENAP, and ENAMI.

On 26 March 2007, she resigned from the leadership of the National Energy Commission and was succeeded by economist Marcelo Tokman. He inherited responsibility for addressing one of Chile's principal challenges: insufficient long-term investment in electricity generation capacity, compounded by reductions in natural gas imports from Argentina and a severe drought that significantly affected the country's major reservoirs.

In January 2008, Bachelet carried out a cabinet reshuffle in which Poniachik was removed as Minister of Mining and replaced by engineer Santiago González Larraín.

In March 2008, she was appointed chief negotiator for Chile's accession to the Organisation for Economic Co-operation and Development (OECD), a goal ultimately achieved in January 2010.

In August 2009, she became chair of Chile Transparente, the Chilean chapter of Transparency International. During her tenure, she faced controversy over a report criticizing presidential candidate Sebastián Piñera, which had reportedly been published without the approval of the organization's board. She resigned from the position on 20 April 2010.

Because of her association with Fundación Expansiva, she was often regarded as politically close to her former professor Andrés Velasco, who served as Minister of Finance under Bachelet and was one of the most influential members of her cabinet. She later served as Director of the Columbia Global Center for Latin America, based in Santiago, and sat on the boards of four companies.

She died in Santiago on 12 October 2022 at the age of fifty-seven from pancreatic cancer. Political figures and former colleagues, including Ricardo Lagos, Michelle Bachelet, and the then Ministers of Mining and Energy under President Gabriel Boric, Marcela Hernando and Diego Pardow, publicly expressed their condolences.
