= Tama Te Ra'a Photovoltaic Plant =

Photovoltaic power plant in Easter Island, Chile

- Country: Chile
- Location: Easter Island
- Coordinates: 27°09′46.6″S 109°25′50.0″W
- Commission date: 2018

Solar farm
- Type: Standard PV

Power generation
- Nameplate capacity: 100 kW
- Annual net output: 200 MWh

The Tama Te Ra'a Photovoltaic Plant is a photovoltaic power station in Easter Island, Chile. It is the first photovoltaic power station in Easter Island.

== History ==
The power plant was commissioned in 2018 as the first photovoltaic power station in the island. It was inaugurated by Chile Energy Minister Susana Jiménez Schuster on 9 November 2018.

== Technical specifications ==
The power plant has a generation capacity of 100 kW. It produces 200 MWh of electricity annually. It consists of 400 polycrystalline silicon panels. The outgoing transformer converts the electricity from 0.42 kV to 13.2 kV which will be distributed through 100-meter-long distribution line to Mataveri Substation.

== See also ==
- List of power stations in Chile
