= Máximo Pacheco Gómez =

Chilean politician and jurist (1924–2012)

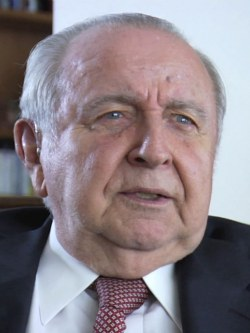
- Pacheco Gómez in 2011

Ambassador of Chile to the Holy See
- In office 2001–2007

Judge of the Inter-American Court of Human Rights
- In office 1992–2003

Member of the Senate of Chile
- In office 11 March 1990 – 11 March 1994
- Preceded by: Creation of the position
- Succeeded by: Francisco Javier Errázuriz
- Constituency: 10th Circunscription (Northern Maule)

Minister of Education
- In office 4 March 1968 – 3 November 1970
- President: Eduardo Frei Montalva
- Preceded by: Juan Gómez Millas
- Succeeded by: Mario Astorga

Ambassador of Chile to the Soviet Union
- In office 1965–1968
- Preceded by: Luis David Cruz Ocampo
- Succeeded by: Óscar Pinochet de la Barra

Personal details
- Born: Máximo José Nemesio Pacheco Gómez; 26 October 1924 Santiago, Chile
- Died: 5 May 2012 (aged 87) Santiago, Chile
- Party: Christian Democratic Party
- Spouse(s): Adriana Matte Alessandri; Mercedes Pérez Campino
- Children: Nine
- Education: Instituto Nacional General José Miguel Carrera
- Alma mater: University of Chile (LL.B); Sapienza University of Rome (Ph.D)
- Occupation: Politician
- Profession: Lawyer

Máximo Pacheco Gómez (Note: In this Spanish name, the first or paternal surname is Pacheco and the second or maternal family name is Gómez.) (26 October 1924 − 5 May 2012) was a Chilean politician and lawyer. He served as a senator, minister of education, and ambassador to both the Soviet Union and the Vatican, and was a judge on the Inter-American Court of Human Rights.

== Professional life ==
Máximo Pacheco Gómez was born in Santiago in 1924 to Máximo Pacheco del Campo and Sara Gómez Pérez. In 1926 his father was appointed governor of Rengo and Pacheco Gómez's first days at school took place there. The family returned to Santiago in 1930, and he continued his education at the Instituto Nacional. From 1942 to 1948 studied at the Universidad de Chile, where he earned a law degree. In 1949 he won a scholarship awarded by the government of Italy to study at the University of Rome, where he completed his doctorate. After returning to Chile, he taught at the University of Chile's law school.

In 1965, following the previous year's re-establishment of diplomatic relations between the two countries, President Eduardo Frei Montalva appointed him ambassador to the Soviet Union, where he remained until 1968. President Frei then selected him to serve as his minister of education until the end of his presidential term in 1970. Two of his most important achievements at the ministry were introducing standardized uniforms for all schools, both public and private, and allowing high-school students to discharge their military service obligations simultaneously with their studies.

From 1970 until his removal by de facto president Augusto Pinochet in 1974, he was the dean of the law school at the University of Chile. In 1978, together with Jaime Castillo Velasco and others, he founded the Chilean Human Rights Commission, an advocacy NGO with which he served as both vice-president and president. His human rights work continued with his 1984 election as vice-president of the Paris-based International Federation for Human Rights and his 1985 appointment to the board of the Inter-American Institute of Human Rights in San José, Costa Rica.

In March 1989, in the final months of the Pinochet regime following the 1988 plebiscite, Pacheco was allowed to return to his teaching duties at the University of Chile. In the December 1989 general election he was elected to the Senate for the Maule Region on the Christian Democratic Party ticket as part of the Concertación alliance.

In 1991 he was elected by the General Assembly of the Organization of American States, held in Santiago, to a six-year term as a judge on the Inter-American Court of Human Rights. He served on the court from 1992 to 2003 (following his re-election in 1997), including a term as its vice president in 2000–2001. The cases on which he and his fellow judges ruled during his tenure included The Caracazo v. Venezuela (1999), Barrios Altos v. Peru (2001) and the Mayagna (Sumo) Awas Tingni Community v. Nicaragua (2001). He also contributed to advisory opinions on such matters as the right to information on consular assistance and the human rights of children.

In 2001, President Ricardo Lagos appointed him ambassador to the Holy See, where he served until 2007 during the papacies of both John Paul II and Benedict XVI. In 2010 he was named Professor Emeritus of the University of Chile.

Máximo Pacheco Gómez died in Santiago on 5 May 2012 after being hospitalized a few days earlier. The government of Chile declared a national day of mourning on 7 May.

== Personal life ==
Pacheco Gómez married Adriana Matte Alessandri, the daughter of senator and 1952 presidential candidate Arturo Matte Larraín, in 1948. Following Adriana's death in 2000, he married Mercedes Pérez Campino in 2003.

He was the father of nine children, including Máximo Pacheco Matte, who served as minister of energy in 2014–2016 under President Michelle Bachelet.

Pacheco's parents were both agnostics – his mother, in particular, was anti-clerical –and he had no religious instruction in his early years. After meeting his future wife, however, he embraced the Roman Catholic faith and received his First Communion at the age of 19.
