= 2011 Magallanes protests =

2011 protests over rising of gas prices in Magallanes
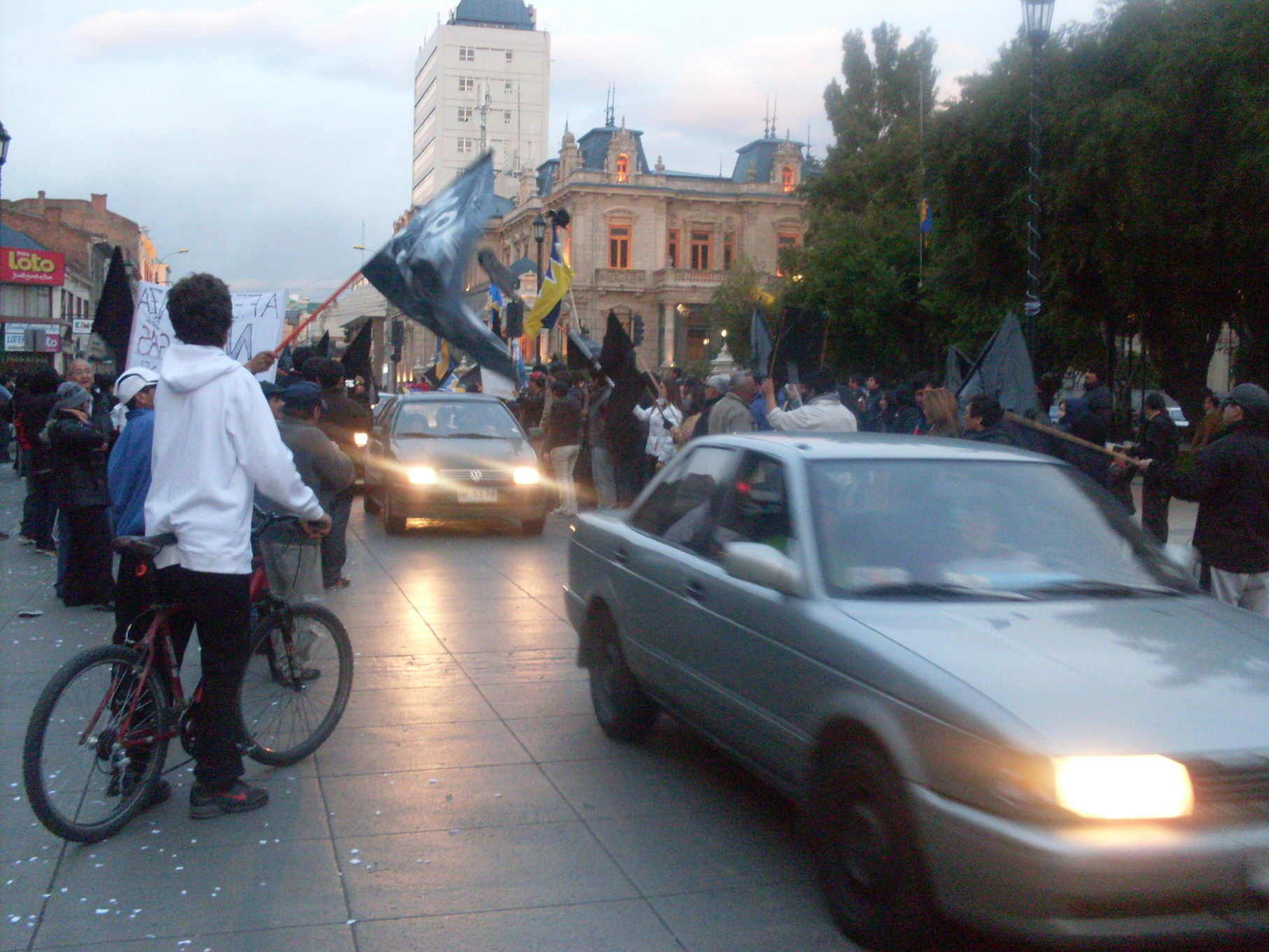
- Protests in Punta Arenas, Magallanes y la Antártica Chilena Region
- Date: January 2011
- Location: Magallanes y la Antártica Chilena Region, Chile
- Also known as: El Segundo Puntarenazo (the Second Puntarenazo)

The 2011 Magallanes protests were a series of protests provoked by the rising of natural gas prices in the Chilean region of Magallanes, in January 2011. The conflict ended on January 18, when Laurence Golborne and the Citizens Assembly of Magallanes reached an agreement.

== Background ==
On December 29, 2010, the directory of Empresa Nacional del Petróleo (ENAP, National Petroleum Company) faced with high deficits due to subsidies provided to XII Region (Magallanes and Antártica Chilena) gas customers, proposed to increase the price of the natural gas by 16.8% in the region, located in the southern extreme of Chile, where everything requires gas heating because of the extreme climate. The apparent increase in the price was actually the result of a reduction of the heavily subsidised pricing for natural gas for users in this region. ENAP provides subsidies of approximately 80 percent of the delivered cost of gas in this region. As a result, users receive extremely low-cost natural gas, while residential users of natural gas in the Santiago region pay extremely high prices for the same commodity.

== Protests ==
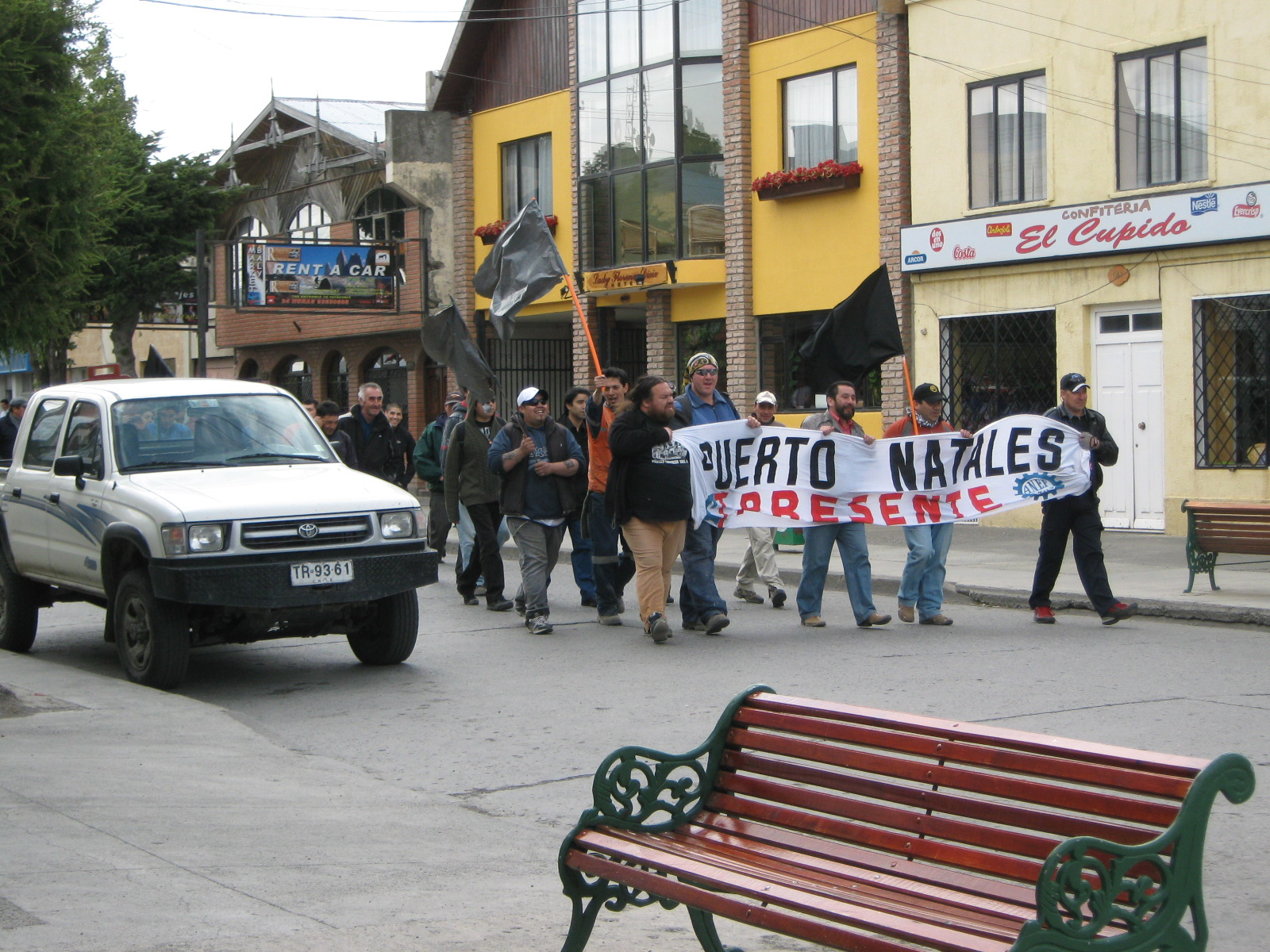
Residents of Puerto Natales protesting against the increasing of the gas price.

Empresa Nacional del Petróleo's decision, supported by the President Sebastián Piñera, the Energy Minister Ricardo Raineri, and the Mining Minister Laurence Golborne, prompted a series of protests in that region during the following weeks, including mass mobilisations, and a stoppage in the region's most important cities, such as Punta Arenas and Puerto Natales.

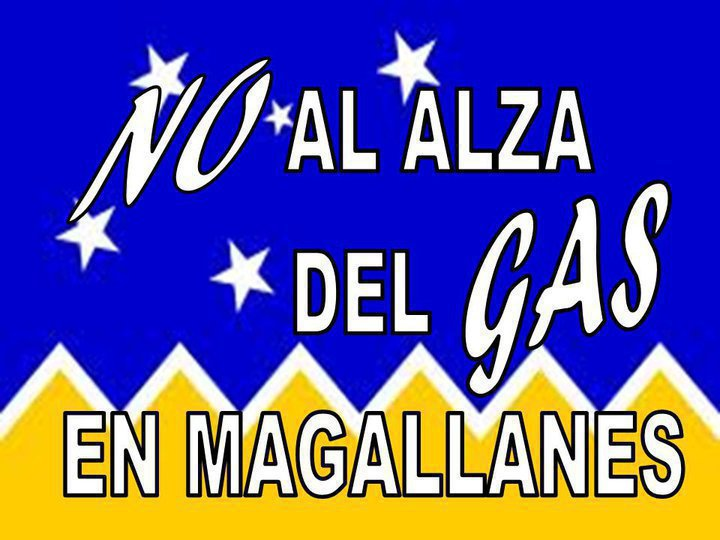
Stylized version of the Magallanes y la Antártica Chilena Region flag, saying "No to the increase of gas [prices] in Magallanes."

On January 11, the Asamblea Ciudadana de Magallanes (Magallanes Citizens' Assembly) convoked an indefinite strike from that midnight. Two women, Claudia Castillo Campos, 19, and Melisa Silva Ruiz, 23, were killed by a truck during the protests in Punta Arenas that night. The driver of the truck was trying to run through the illegal barricades that were being operated by the persons who were injured. The events took place late at night and involved the serious injury of an unsupervised small child. The parents, who could have been charged with endangering the child, received no legal sanctions. On the same day, more than thirty-one persons were arrested, some while trying to loot, burn, or otherwise destroy public property. Punta Arenas judges ordered the nearly immediate release of almost all those who were caught by the police. After the first manifestations, Carabineros de Chile requested a contingent of Special Forces to control the strike.

During the January 12, the strike continued in the main towns of the Magallanes y la Antártica Chilena Region, extending itself to the main border crossings with Argentina. More than two thousand cars remained isolated while trying to cross from the province of Tierra del Fuego to the province of Santa Cruz through Chilean territory. Another 1,500 tourists were left without movement in Torres del Paine National Park after routes to Puerto Natales and El Calafate were cut. Actions by the protesters halted buses of people attempting to flee from Chile, leaving them at barricaded locations outside the cities, unable to move except by walking. This "forced march" situation adversely affected many elderly tourists, including those with disabilities, resulting in human rights complaints and well as violations of Chilean national law providing for free passage within the country. The Chilean national police, the Carabineros, refused to act on behalf of the foreign visitors by enforcing the national law, instead leaving these people without access to food or water, stranded without transportation outside the cities. Many elderly and handicapped people were thus forced to walk for up to 20 km. Before the regional protests and rebellion against the law were over, thousands of people had to be evacuated. Some chose to walk from Puerto Natales to the frontier with Argentina, where they were received as refugees, and given assistance to onward travel and other accommodation. Eventually the US Embassy quietly arranged for a cooperative effort involving the Chilean Air Force. Squadron Commander Vegas was credited with a successful airlift of several thousand visitors, with most being delivered to the Punta Arenas airport for onward transportation so that those people could flee from southern Chile. LAN airlines was able to evacuate many of these affected people with flights to Santiago.

Although it worked normally, cuts in the route to President Carlos Ibáñez del Campo International Airport forced the suspension of Sky Airline and LAN Airlines flights.

== Consequences ==
Prior to the conclusion of the protests, the Interior Ministry invoked the Law of Internal Security of the State, with the intent to begin judicial determination of those responsible for the damages inflicted during the disturbances. The value of the damages varies, but was estimated in the Prensa Austral as being economic damage of approximately US$14 million, with additional damages to the infrastructure of Punta Arenas. The law of Internal Security of the State also provides for the use of the Chilean armed forces in restoring civil order, and the invocation of this law may have played a part in bringing the Asambla Ciudadana de Magallanes to the bargaining table. On January 14, the Minister Secretary General of Government Ena von Baer announced changes in Sebastián Piñera's Government cabinet, including the resignment of Ricardo Raineri as Energy Minister. Laurence Golborne became Mining and Energy Minister, on January 16.

== End of the conflict ==
On January 18, an agreement between the Government of Chile and the Magallanes Citizens' Assembly was signed. The government proposed to increase the price of gas by 3%, far less than its originally planned increase of almost 17%. Industries will also be benefited by the agreement. Also, the government proposed to give 17,000 subsidies to the poorest families in the region, which will not be affected by the 3% increase.

== See also ==
- 2006 student protests in Chile
- 2011–2012 Chilean student protests
- 2012 Aysén protests
- 1997 Chilean student movement
