= Citizens' assembly (disambiguation) =

A citizens' assembly is a deliberative assembly of randomly selected citizens.

- Citizens' Assembly (Ireland), established in 2016
- Citizens' assembly (Venezuela), a direct democracy component of a Communal Council
- Ecclesia (ancient Greece), an assembly of citizens

Citizens' Assembly may also refer to:

- Citizen legislature or "citizens' assembly", a U.S. term for a legislature where legislators have other jobs
- Citizens Assembly of Magallanes, involved in the 2011 Magallanes protests
- Helsinki Citizens' Assembly, a human rights NGO
- Citizens' assemblies of the Roman Republic, direct democratic legislative bodies overseen by magistrates who held absolute power, checked only by other magistrates.

== See also ==
- Category:Citizens' assemblies
- Popular assembly
