= Santiago González Larraín =

Chilean politician

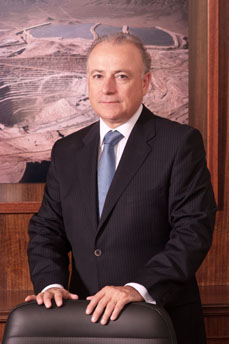
- González Larraín at 2018

Rector of the Central University of Chile
- Incumbent
- Assumed office 15 July 2015
- Preceded by: Rafael Rosell

Minister of Mining
- In office 11 March 2006 – 11 March 2010
- Preceded by: Karen Poniachik
- Succeeded by: Laurence Golborne

Personal details
- Born: 15 May 1956 (age 70) Santiago, Chile
- Party: Radical Party; Radical Social Democrat Party (1994−2018)
- Spouse: María Loreto Lihn
- Children: Four
- Parent(s): Carlos González Márquez; Silvia Larraín Talloni
- Education: University of Santiago, Chile (BA); Pontifical Catholic University of Chile (MA); University of Chile (PhD)
- Occupation: Researcher and Scholar
- Profession: Civil engineer

Santiago Fernando González Larraín (born 15 May 1956) is a Chilean engineer who served as minister during the first government of Michelle Bachelet (2006–2010).

Since 2015, he is rector of the Central University of Chile.

He was a member of the board of directors of the National Mining Company (Enami) during the administration of President Eduardo Frei Ruiz-Tagle from 1994 to 1998 and, subsequently, from 2006 during the first government of Michelle Bachelet.

== Biography ==
He is the son of former Radical Party senator, party leader, and sports commentator Carlos González Márquez, who served as regional governor of the Valparaíso Region during the administration of socialist president Salvador Allende. He has been married since 1983 to María Loreto Lihn Merino, with whom he has four children: Carlos Andrés, Macarena Loreto, Tomás Ignacio, and a fourth child.

He studied civil engineering with a specialization in Civil Works at the University of Santiago, Chile between 1977 and 1982. He holds a master's degree in liberal arts from the Adolfo Ibáñez University and a postgraduate diploma in business administration from the Pontifical Catholic University of Chile (PUC), as well as a diploma in project planning and evaluation from the Faculty of Economics and Business (FEN), University of Chile.

He served as Administration and Finance Manager of Eulogio Gordo y Cía., a contracting company specializing in major civil engineering and mining development projects.

== Public career ==
Between 1997 and 1999, he served as General Manager of the Metropolitan Sanitary Works Company (Emos).

From 2000 to 2007, he was General Manager of the state-owned company Polla Chilena de Beneficencia, a gambling and lottery operator.

He assumed office as Minister of Mining on 8 January 2008. In that capacity, he also served as chairman of the boards of Codelco, ENAP, and Enami.

One of his principal responsibilities as minister was to improve the corporate governance of Codelco, a company that generates a substantial share of the Chilean government's annual revenues.

In mid-2015, he became rector of the Central University of Chile.
