= Aurora Williams =

Chilean politician

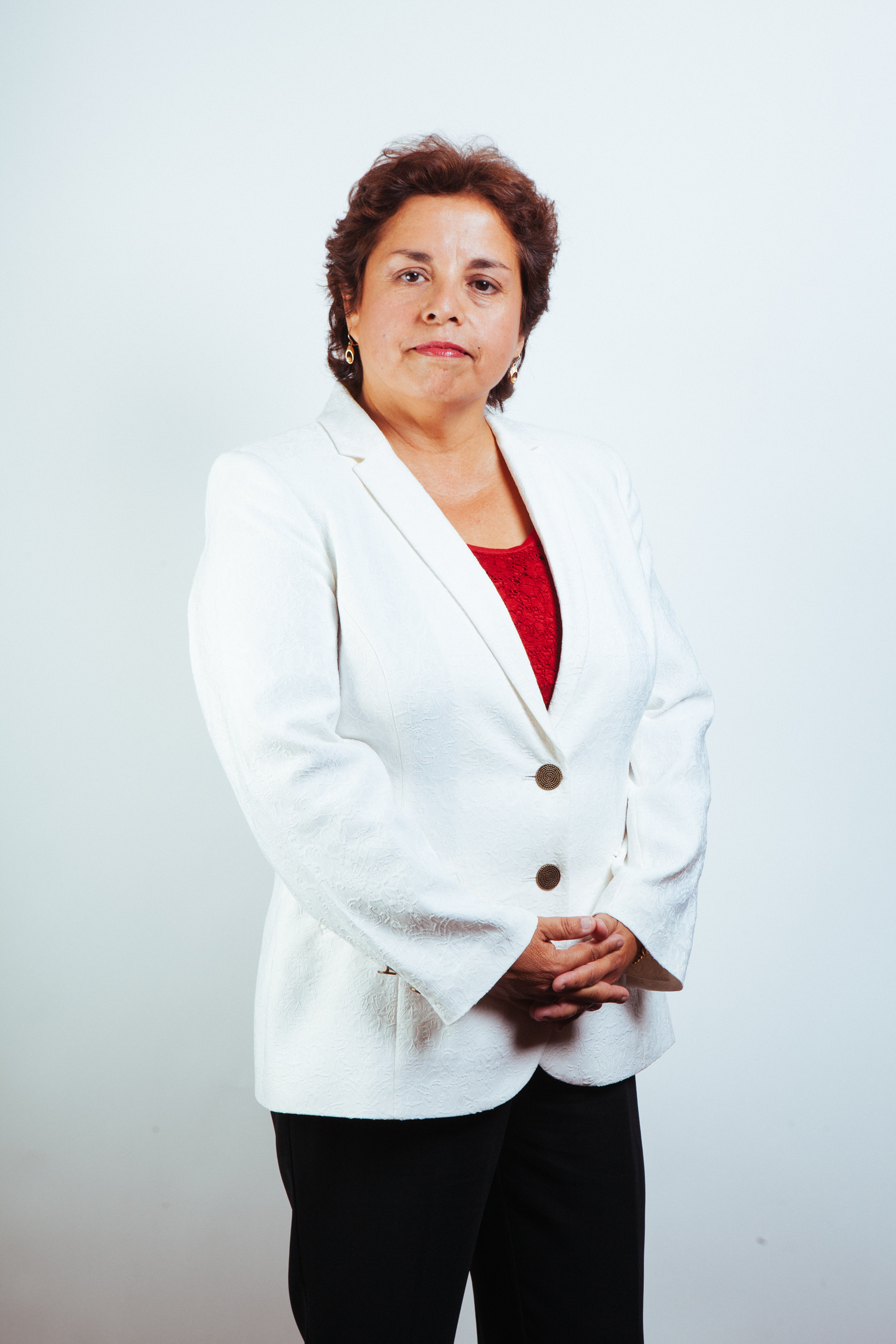

Minister of Mining
- In office 16 August 2023 – 11 March 2026
- President: Gabriel Boric
- Preceded by: Marcela Hernando
- Succeeded by: Daniel Mas
- In office 11 March 2014 – 11 March 2018
- President: Michelle Bachelet
- Preceded by: Hernán de Solminihac
- Succeeded by: Baldo Prokurica

Personal details
- Born: 13 August 1962 (age 63) Antofagasta, Chile
- Party: Social Democrat Radical Party; Radical Party
- Website: www.minmineria.gob.cl/ministerio/aurora-williams-baussa-ministra-de-mineria/

Aurora Elvira Williams Baussa (born 13 August 1962) is a Chilean economist and politician affiliated with the Radical Party (PR). She served as Minister of Mining under President Gabriel Boric, having been reappointed to the post in August 2023. She previously held the same position during the second administration of President Michelle Bachelet from 2014 to 2018, becoming the first and, so far, only person to serve a full presidential term as Minister of Mining in Chilean history.

== Early life and education ==
Williams was born in Antofagasta, Chile, to Federico Williams Rojo and Rina Ester Baussa Ortiz. She earned a degree in ingeniería comercial—a program combining economics and business administration—from the Catholic University of the North, followed by a master's in Business Administration and Management from the University of Lleida in Spain. She also completed an MBA in Business Management and Training at IEDE Business School in Chile.

== Career ==
Williams has worked in both the public and private sectors, primarily in executive roles. She served as client manager and later as administrative and financial manager at the Antofagasta Sanitary Services Company, and then as client manager at Aguas de Antofagasta. Her roles focused on resource management, goal planning, and procurement.

During Michelle Bachelet's first presidential term (2006–2010), Williams was appointed Regional Ministerial Secretary (Seremi) of Public Works for the Antofagasta Region. In this capacity, she oversaw infrastructure investments in the region and coordinated the reconstruction efforts following the 2007 Tocopilla earthquake.

Subsequently, she worked as administrative and financial manager at Antofagasta Terminal International (ATI), a port concessionaire responsible for 60% of private mining exports in the region and associated with the Luksic Group.

=== Minister of Mining (2014–2018) ===
In March 2014, Williams was appointed Minister of Mining by President Michelle Bachelet, becoming the second woman to lead the ministry after Karen Poniachik. As minister, she also assumed the presidency of the boards of the state-owned National Mining Company (ENAMI) and the Chilean Copper Commission (COCHILCO).

During her tenure, she:

- Oversaw the repeal of the Ley Reservada del Cobre, removing the secrecy surrounding defense-related copper revenues.
- Promoted the capitalization of Codelco to finance its structural projects.
- Introduced legislation creating a Price Stabilization Mechanism for Small-Scale Mining.
- Oversaw the definitive closure of two controversial mining projects: the Chilean-Argentine Pascua Lama project and the Dominga project.
- Led the government's response to the fatal flooding incident at the Cerro Bayo mine in Chile Chico in 2017, where two miners were trapped and later found dead.

She also created the National Lithium Commission, aimed at developing a public policy for lithium mining in Chile. The commission classified lithium as a strategic mineral and recommended the State retain ownership of lithium resources. However, following negotiations, the Chilean Economic Development Agency (CORFO) reached an agreement with private mining company SQM (Soquimich) to continue exploiting lithium until 2030. This followed a failed public tender during Sebastián Piñera's first administration, which had awarded lithium rights to SQM despite the company's ongoing legal disputes with the State. The controversy led to the resignation and later prosecution of then-Deputy Mining Secretary Pablo Wagner for document forgery.

=== Other roles ===
Between March and October 2018, after leaving the national cabinet, Williams served as Executive Secretary of the Municipal Corporation for Social Development in Antofagasta. Her appointment by right-wing mayor Karen Rojo caused discontent within her own Radical Party.

=== Return as Minister of Mining (2023–2026) ===
In August 2023, President Gabriel Boric appointed Williams as Minister of Mining in a cabinet reshuffle, replacing Marcela Hernando.

== Personal life ==
Williams has been married to Homero Francisco Bonilla Pizarro since 2000 and has one daughter.

== Honors ==
=== Foreign honors ===
- Grand Cross of the Order of Civil Merit (Spain, 24 October 2014).
