= Claudio Huepe Minoletti =

Chilean politician (born 1966)

Claudio Huepe
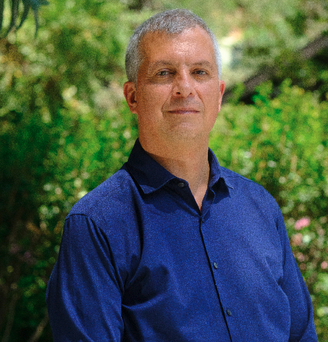
- Claudio Huepe in 2022

Minister of Energy
- In office 11 March 2022 – 6 December 2022
- President: Gabriel Boric
- Preceded by: Juan Carlos Jobet
- Succeeded by: Diego Pardow

Personal details
- Born: 7 February 1966 (age 60) Santiago, Chile
- Party: Social Convergence (2019−present)
- Spouse: Daniela Marinovic
- Parent(s): Claudio Huepe; Gilda Minoletti
- Education: Pontifical Catholic University of Chile (B.Sc); University College London (M.Sc)
- Occupation: Politician
- Profession: Business administration

Claudio Humberto Huepe Minoletti (born 7 August 1966) is a Chilean politician who has served as the Minister of Energy since 11 March 2022.

From March to September 2022, he served as Minister of Energy under the government of Gabriel Boric.

== Family and education ==
He is the son of Gilda Minoletti Scaramelli and Christian Democratic politician Claudio Huepe García, who served as a member of the Chamber of Deputies between 1990 and 1994, and as Minister Secretary-General of Government during the administration of President Ricardo Lagos.

He pursued higher education in business administration at the Pontifical Catholic University of Chile (PUC), and later completed a master's degree in economics at the same institution. He also obtained a Master of Science in natural resource economics and environmental economics from University College London, England. He was married to Daniela Marinovic Chodowiecki (died in 2012).

== Professional career ==
He has worked in both the public and private sectors. During the government of President Patricio Aylwin, he worked at the Ministry of Mining (1992–1994) in the Environmental Unit, of which he was appointed head at the beginning of the administration of President Eduardo Frei Ruiz-Tagle.

He subsequently worked as a private consultant and, from 2007 onward, served as head of the studies department of the National Energy Commission (CNE) during the first government of Michelle Bachelet under Minister Marcelo Tokman.

In February 2010, he was appointed head of the Division of Foresight and Policy of the newly created Ministry of Energy, a position he continued to hold during the first government of Sebastián Piñera until 2011.

He served as director of the Center for Energy and Sustainable Development at Diego Portales University (UDP) and was an academic at that institution until 2024.

== Political career ==
In January 2022, he was appointed by then president-elect Gabriel Boric as Minister of Energy, assuming office on 11 March of that year with the formal start of the administration.
