= Juan Carlos Jobet =

Chilean politician

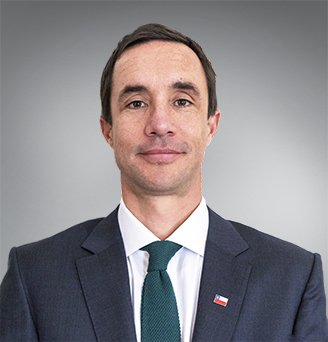
- Official portrait

Minister of Mining
- In office 18 December 2020 – 11 March 2022
- President: Sebastián Piñera
- Preceded by: Baldo Prokurica
- Succeeded by: Marcela Hernando

Minister of Energy
- In office 13 June 2019 – 11 March 2022
- President: Sebastián Piñera
- Preceded by: Susana Jiménez Schuster
- Succeeded by: Claudio Huepe Minoletti

Minister of Labor and Social Provision
- In office 24 July 2013 – 11 March 2014
- President: Sebastián Piñera
- Preceded by: Evelyn Matthei
- Succeeded by: Javiera Blanco

Personal details
- Born: 14 October 1975 (age 51) Santiago, Chile
- Party: Renovación Nacional
- Education: Pontifical Catholic University of Chile (BS); Harvard University (MS)
- Profession: Business administrator

Juan Carlos Jobet Eluchans is a Chilean politician and former member of Renovación Nacional. He was the Minister of Mining of Chile between 2020 and 2022.

== Early life and career ==
Jobet is the son of Juan Carlos Jobet Sotomayor and the journalist Celia Eluchans. He is also a nephew of Edmundo Eluchans Urenda.

Jobet studied commercial engineering at the Pontificia Universidad Católica de Chile. He has a master's degree in Business Administration and Public Administration from Harvard University.

Between 2000 and 2010 Jobet worked at the company ASSET Chile.

== Political career ==
Between 2013 and 2014, Jobet served as Minister of Labor and Social Security during President Sebastián Piñera's first government. On 13 June 2019, he was appointed Minister of Energy during Piñera's second government.

Jobet entered politics with his incorporation into the organization Independientes en Red, created by Cristina Bitar. Later, he was founder, along with Felipe Kast, of a think tank called Horizontal. Then, in 2010 he joined to political party Renovación Nacional. At Sebastián Piñera's first government beginning, he assumed as Chief of Staff of then Minister of the Interior Rodrigo Hinzpeter. On 29 July 2011, he was appointed Undersecretary of Housing. He worked there until 12 November 2012. On 24 July 2013, he assumed as Minister of Labor and Social Security of Chile following Evelyn Matthei (UDI) resignation. He remained in the charge until the end of Piñera's government.

On 13 June 2019, Jobet was appointed Minister of Energy during Piñera's second government. He replaced Susana Jiménez.

On 18 December 2020, he became the Minister of Mining under Sebastián Piñera.

== Other activities ==
- P4G – Partnering for Green Growth and the Global Goals 2030, Member of the Board of Directors (since 2020)

== Personal life ==
In 2004 Jobet married the historian Luz María Díaz de Valdés Herrera, daughter of the lawyer and former Club Deportivo Universidad Católica's president Manuel Díaz de Valdés. He had two daughters with her.
