= Andrés Rebolledo =

Chilean politician

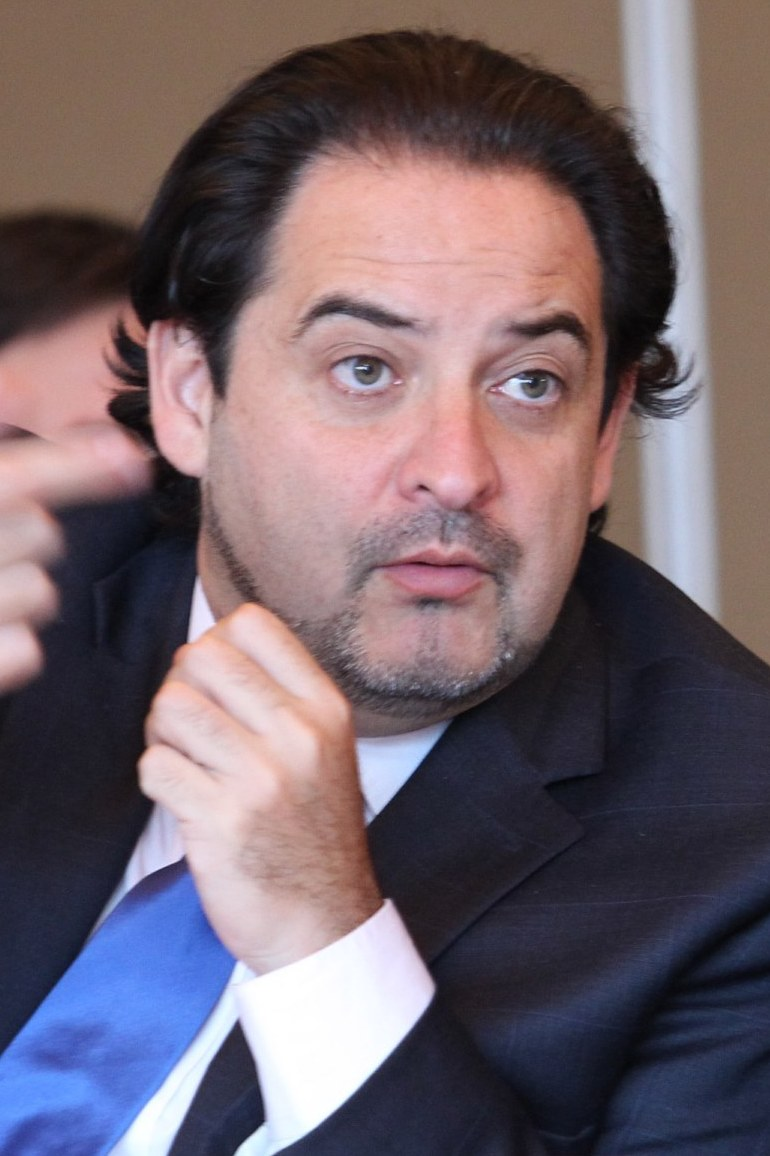

Minister of Energy
- In office 19 October 2016 – 11 March 2018
- President: Michelle Bachelet
- Preceded by: Máximo Pacheco Matte
- Succeeded by: Susana Jiménez Schuster

General Director of Economical Foreign Affairs
- In office 11 March 2014 – 19 October 2016
- Preceded by: Álvaro Jana Linetzky
- Succeeded by: Paulina Nazal Aranda

Personal details
- Born: 17 April 1968 (age 58) Santiago, Chile
- Party: Socialist Party
- Education: University of Chile (B.Sc); Complutense University of Madrid (M.Sc)
- Occupation: Politician
- Profession: Economist

Andrés Ignacio Rebolledo Smitmans (born 17 April 1968) is a Chilean politician and economist. He was a minister during the second government of Michelle Bachelet.

In 2009, Bachelet appointed him as Ambassador of Chile to Uruguay as well as the representative of the country to ALADI. From 2010 to 2014, he was a consultant in the Integration and Trade area of the Inter-American Development Bank (IDB) in Washington DC, United States.

In March 2014, he was appointed as general director of the Direcon during Bachelet's second government. Then, in October 2016 he became Minister of Energy in replacement of Máximo Pacheco Matte.

== Early life and education ==
Rebolledo studied at the Instituto Nacional and later at the Faculty of Economics and Business (FEN) of the University of Chile, where he joined the Socialist Party of Chile. He subsequently pursued postgraduate studies in international economics and economic development at the Complutense University of Madrid in Spain.

During the 1990s, Rebolledo joined the General Directorate of International Economic Relations (Direcon), where he was responsible for relations with Mexico, Central America, and the Latin American Integration Association (ALADI). He later became head of the Department of Latin America and Integration, and from 2005 to 2008 served as director of bilateral economic affairs at Direcon.

== Political career ==
In 2009, President Michelle Bachelet appointed Rebolledo as ambassador of Chile to Uruguay and the country's representative to the Latin American Integration Association (ALADI). Between 2010 and 2014, he worked as a consultant in the Integration and Trade Division of the Inter-American Development Bank (IDB) in Washington, D.C., United States.

In March 2014, Rebolledo was appointed director general of Direcon during the Michelle Bachelet's second administration. In October 2016, he became Minister of Energy, succeeding Máximo Pacheco.

From 2020 to 2022, Rebolledo served as dean of the Faculty of Administration and Business at SEK University Chile. In December 2022, he was elected to lead the Latin American Energy Organization (OLADE) and assumed office as executive secretary on 1 March 2023.
