= Ignacio Pérez Walker =

Chilean politician (born 1948)

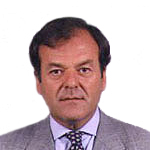

Member of the Senate of Chile
- In office 11 March 1990 – 11 March 2002
- Preceded by: Creation of the Circumscription
- Succeeded by: Baldo Prokurica
- Constituency: 3rd Circumscription

Personal details
- Born: 4 August 1948 (age 78) Santiago, Chile
- Party: National Renewal (RN)
- Spouse(s): Carmen Noguera (div.); Marianela López
- Children: Three
- Parent(s): Clemente Pérez Zañartu; Teresa Walker Concha
- Relatives: Horacio Walker (grandfather)
- Education: Pontifical Catholic University of Chile (LL.B); Université catholique de Louvain (MD)
- Occupation: Politician
- Profession: Lawyer

Juan Ignacio Pérez Walker (born 4 August 1948) is a Chilean politician who served as Senator.

He served as Senator for the 3rd Senatorial Constituency, Atacama Region, for two consecutive terms between 1990 and 2002, representing Renovación Nacional.

== Biography ==
=== Family and youth ===
He was born in Santiago, Chile, on 4 August 1948. He is the son of Clemente Pérez Zañartu, who served as Ambassador to the Holy See during the government of President Eduardo Frei Montalva, and Teresa Walker Concha.

In April 2013, he married Marianela de Lourdes López Diez. He is the father of three daughters.

=== Professional career ===
He completed his secondary education at the Instituto de Humanidades Luis Campino in Santiago and at the Notre Dame International School in Rome, Italy. After finishing school, he entered the Law program at the Pontifical Catholic University of Chile. He qualified as a lawyer on 25 November 1974.

During his university years, he served as a teaching assistant in Political Law between 1972 and 1974 and later became a full professor of Sociology at the School of Engineering of the University of Chile.

After graduating, he completed a Master’s degree in Development Sciences with a specialization in Economics at the Institute of Social Doctrines (ILADES), a degree validated by the Catholic University of Leuven, Belgium.

He practiced law independently and, between 1974 and 1976, was a member of the law firm of Ángel Fernández Sotomayor. In parallel, he served on the board of directors of Coopeseguros S.A. and the José Cardijn Foundation. He also worked as a legal advisor for Cooprev Ltda. Between 1976 and 1977, he was Director of Peugeot Chile S.A., and subsequently served as director of Compañía Forestal de Chiloé S.A. and the Hogar de Cristo.

Between 1984 and 1988, he worked as a political and economic affairs commentator for the Television Corporation of the University of Chile and Televisión Nacional de Chile.

In 1987, he was a member of the editorial committee of the magazine Master Club.

== Political career ==
He began his public career when he was appointed by the Military Government as Executive Secretary of the Economic and Social Council in 1985. Between 1988 and 1989, he served as Vice President of that body.

In 1987, he acted as an advisor to the General Directorate of the State Railways Company of Chile (EFE).

In the parliamentary elections of December 1989, he was elected Senator representing Renovación Nacional in the Democracy and Progress electoral pact, for the 3rd Senatorial Constituency of the Atacama Region, for the 1990–1994 term. He obtained 24,147 votes, corresponding to 22.20% of the validly cast votes. In 1993, he was re-elected for the same constituency for the 1994–2002 term, with 23,737 votes, equivalent to 21.65% of the valid votes.
