= Máximo Pacheco (politician, born 1953) =

Chilean politician

Máximo Pacheco Matte
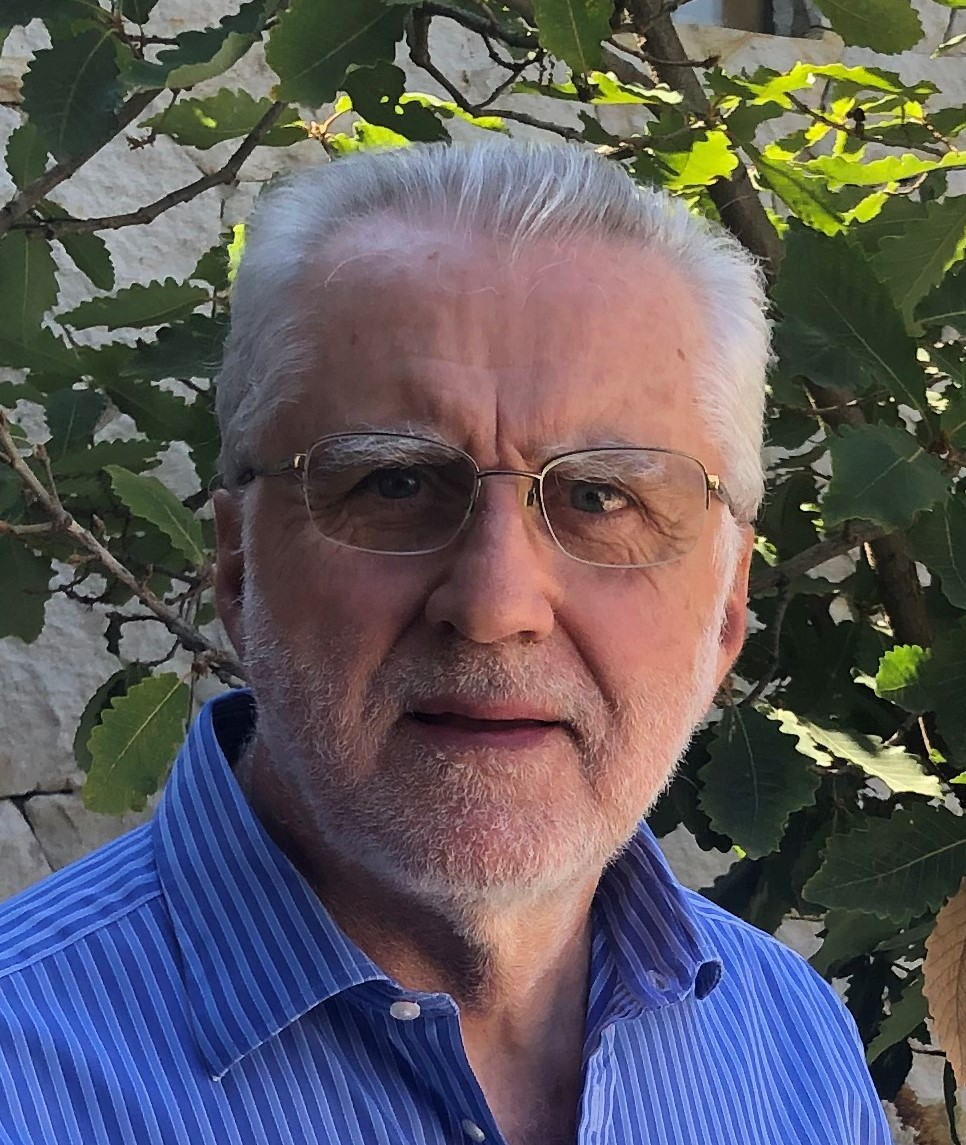

Minister of Energy
- In office 11 March 2014 – 19 October 2016
- President: Michelle Bachelet
- Preceded by: Jorge Bunster
- Succeeded by: Andrés Rebolledo

Personal details
- Born: 12 February 1953 (age 73) Santiago, Chile
- Party: Socialist Party
- Spouse: Soledad Flanagan
- Children: Four
- Education: University of Chile (BA) (MD)
- Occupation: Scholar; Politician
- Profession: Economist

Jorge Máximo Arturo Pacheco Matte (born 12 February 1953) is a Chilean economist and politician. He served as minister of energy in Michelle Bachelet's second government (2014−2018).

== Early life ==
Born in the capital city Santiago de Chile, Pacheco is the son of Christian-Democratic politician Máximo Pacheco Gómez. He attended Saint George's College, located in Las Condes, Santiago. He studied at the University of Chile, earning a Bachelor of Arts in business administration. He finished in 1976 with the specialty of business manager. He continued there and completed an MBA with a mention in economics.

He married designer Soledad Flanagan, with whom he fathered four daughters.

== Career ==
At university Pacheco was a member of the Popular Unitary Action Movement (MAPU), a Christian socialist political movement ally of socialist president Salvador Allende from 1970 to 1973. After the 1973 coup d'état and the military dictatorship, he joined the Socialist Party.

In the late 1990s and 2000s, he was a close collaborator of the presidential campaigns of Ricardo Lagos (1999−00), and Michelle Bachelet (2005−06). Both candidates were ultimately elected to the presidency; during their governments, however, Pacheco worked for American pulp and paper company International Paper (2000−2012).

Pacheco returned to Chile in 2013 after leaving the business world. He helped Bachelet in her campaign for the general elections. Once re-elected, she appointed him as minister of energy in January; he took office on 11 March 2014.

On 19 October 2016, Pacheco resigned from the ministry to become the generalissimo of Lagos's presidential pre-candidacy for the 2017 general election.

== See also ==
- Matte family
