= Baldo Prokurica =

Chilean politician

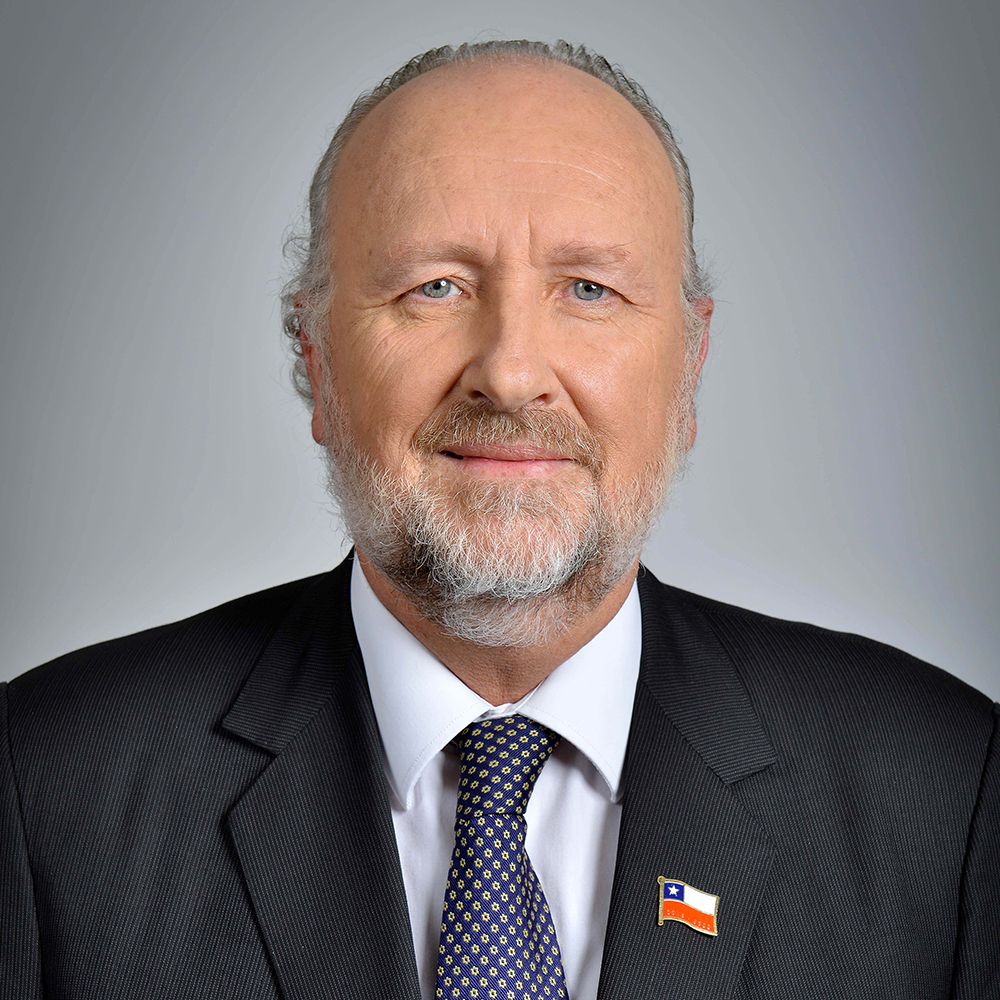

Minister of Defense
- In office 18 September 2020 – 11 March 2022
- President: Sebastián Pinera
- Preceded by: Mario Desbordes
- Succeeded by: Maya Fernández

Minister of Mining
- In office 11 March 2018 – 18 September 2020
- President: Sebastián Pinera
- Preceded by: Aurora Williams
- Succeeded by: Juan Carlos Jobet

Member of the Senate of Chile
- In office 11 March 2002 – 11 March 2018
- Preceded by: Ignacio Pérez Walker
- Succeeded by: Rafael Prohens
- Constituency: 3rd Circumscription

Member of the Chamber of Deputies
- In office 11 March 1990 – 11 March 2002
- Preceded by: District created
- Succeeded by: Alberto Robles
- Constituency: 6th District

Governor of Huasco Province
- In office 1988 – 11 March 1990
- Appointed by: Augusto Pinochet
- Succeeded by: Carlos López Cortés

Personal details
- Born: 2 July 1958 (age 68) Vallenar, Chile
- Party: Renovación Nacional (RN)
- Spouse: Ana María de Las Heras
- Children: Two
- Education: Pontifical Catholic University of Chile (LL.B)
- Occupation: Politician
- Profession: Lawyer

Baldo Petar Prokurica Prokurica (born 2 July 1958) is a lawyer, academic, and politician of Croatian descent.

A Chilean lawyer and politician of the National Renewal party, he served as a Senator for the 3rd Senatorial Circumscription, representing the Atacama Region, for two consecutive terms between 2002 and 2018. Previously, he was a Member of the Chamber of Deputies for District No. 6 in the Atacama Region, serving three consecutive terms between 1990 and 2002.

He served as Minister of Mining from 11 March 2018 to 18 December 2020, and as Minister of National Defense from 18 December 2020 to 11 March 2022, during the second administration of President Sebastián Piñera.

== Early life and education ==
Prokurica was born in Vallenar on 2 July 1958. He is the son of Juan Prokurica Arkelin and Kate Prokurica Pusic. He is married to Ana María de Lourdes de las Heras de Pablo and has two children, Juan Andrés and Francisco.

He completed his primary education at Colegio San Francisco of Vallenar and at the Conciliar Seminary of La Serena between 1965 and 1971. He continued his secondary education at the same seminary, the Liceo de Hombres of Vallenar, and the Scuola Italiana of Santiago between 1972 and 1975.

In 1976, he entered the Faculty of Law at the Pontifical Catholic University of Chile (PUC), where he obtained a degree in Legal and Social Sciences with a thesis titled Advances in Penology. He was admitted to the bar on 28 March 1988.

== Professional career ==
Prokurica worked as a legal clerk at the Labour Directorate for one year. He later engaged in agricultural activities and served on the Financing Commission for the construction of the El Toro Reservoir in the Atacama Region.

Between 2003 and 2005, he served as a visiting professor at the University of Atacama in Copiapó.

== Political career ==
Prokurica began his political activity as a delegate of his faculty to the Student Federation of the PUC (FEUC), where he served for three years.

In 1988, he was appointed Governor of the Huasco Province during the regime of Augusto Pinochet. During his administration, he expanded sewerage coverage to 95%, implemented potable water services for Domeyko, constructed the Hermanos Carrera and Estación health clinics, delivered social housing projects, and paved major streets in several residential neighborhoods of Vallenar.

He later served as acting Intendant of the Atacama Region.

In 1987, Prokurica joined the National Renewal party and assumed the position of vice president of the party in Vallenar. In 1996, Prokurica was awarded by the National Mining Society of Chile (SONAMI) as the best parliamentarian.

As of 30 March 2017, he was a member of the Political Commission of National Renewal, serving as First Vice President of the party.

Between 11 March 2018 and 18 December 2020, Prokurica served as Minister of Mining. From that date until 11 March 2022, he served as Minister of National Defense during the second administration of President Sebastián Piñera Echenique.
