= Jorge Bunster =

Chilean businessman and politician

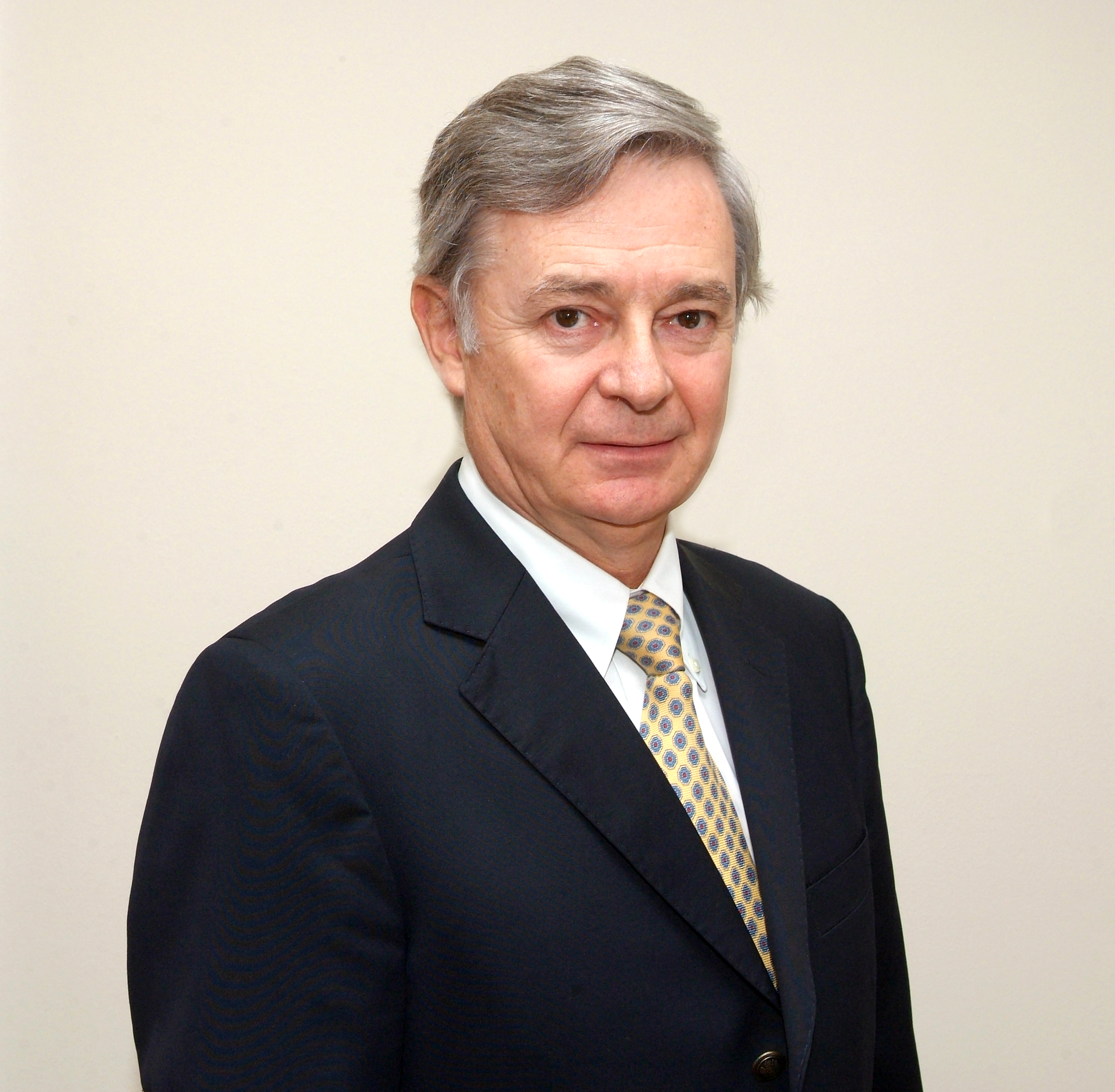
- Jorge Bunster in 2012

Minister of Energy
- In office 3 April 2012 – 11 March 2014
- President: Sebastián Piñera
- Preceded by: Rodrigo Álvarez Zenteno
- Succeeded by: Máximo Pacheco Matte

Personal details
- Born: 17 March 1953 (age 73) Santiago, Chile
- Education: Pontifical Catholic University of Chile
- Occupation: Businessman, politician

Jorge Bunster (born 17 March 1953) is a Chilean businessman and politician. He was the general manager of Empresas Copec for 19 years. He was the Chilean Minister of Energy from 2012 to 2014.

Prior to entering public service in 2010 as an official of the Chilean Ministry of Foreign Affairs, he had an extensive career in the private sector, particularly within the Angelini Group founded by Anacleto Angelini. There, he led Empresas Copec, one of the largest conglomerates in Chile by market capitalization.

== Family and education ==
He was born to the marriage of engineer Gabriel Bunster Saavedra and Sylvia Betteley Besa, who had four other children: Gabriel, Eduardo, Maruja, and Tomás.

He was educated at The Grange School in Santiago, the same institution attended by his father. He later studied business administration at the Pontifical Catholic University of Chile (PUC) and earned a Master of Business Administration (MBA) degree from the IESE Business School of the University of Navarra in Spain.

He is married to María Consuelo Benavente, with whom he has four children: María Consuelo, Josefina, Martín, and Jorge Andrés.

== Professional career ==
Between 1981 and 1985, he was chief executive officer and executive director of AFP Alameda. During the following two years, he worked as general manager of Alimentos Bresler.

In 1986, he was recruited by businessman Anacleto Angelini to work as an executive at Cruz del Sur General Insurance Company. That same year, he joined the board of Compañía de Petróleos de Chile (Copec). After four years, he was appointed chief executive officer. He held this position until 2003, when he went on to lead the fuels division of the newly formed Empresas Copec.

He entered public service in 2010, during the administration of President Sebastián Piñera, as director of the General Directorate of International Economic Relations of the Ministry of Foreign Affairs. On 3 April 2012, he was appointed Minister of Energy.

During his tenure, the bill creating the public electric highway was introduced in the National Congress of Chile.

He left office in March 2014, at the end of Piñera’s administration. He is a member of the board of directors of Organización Terpel S.A. (Colombia).
