= 2012 Aysén protests =

Series of protests in Chile

2012 protests in Aysén Region
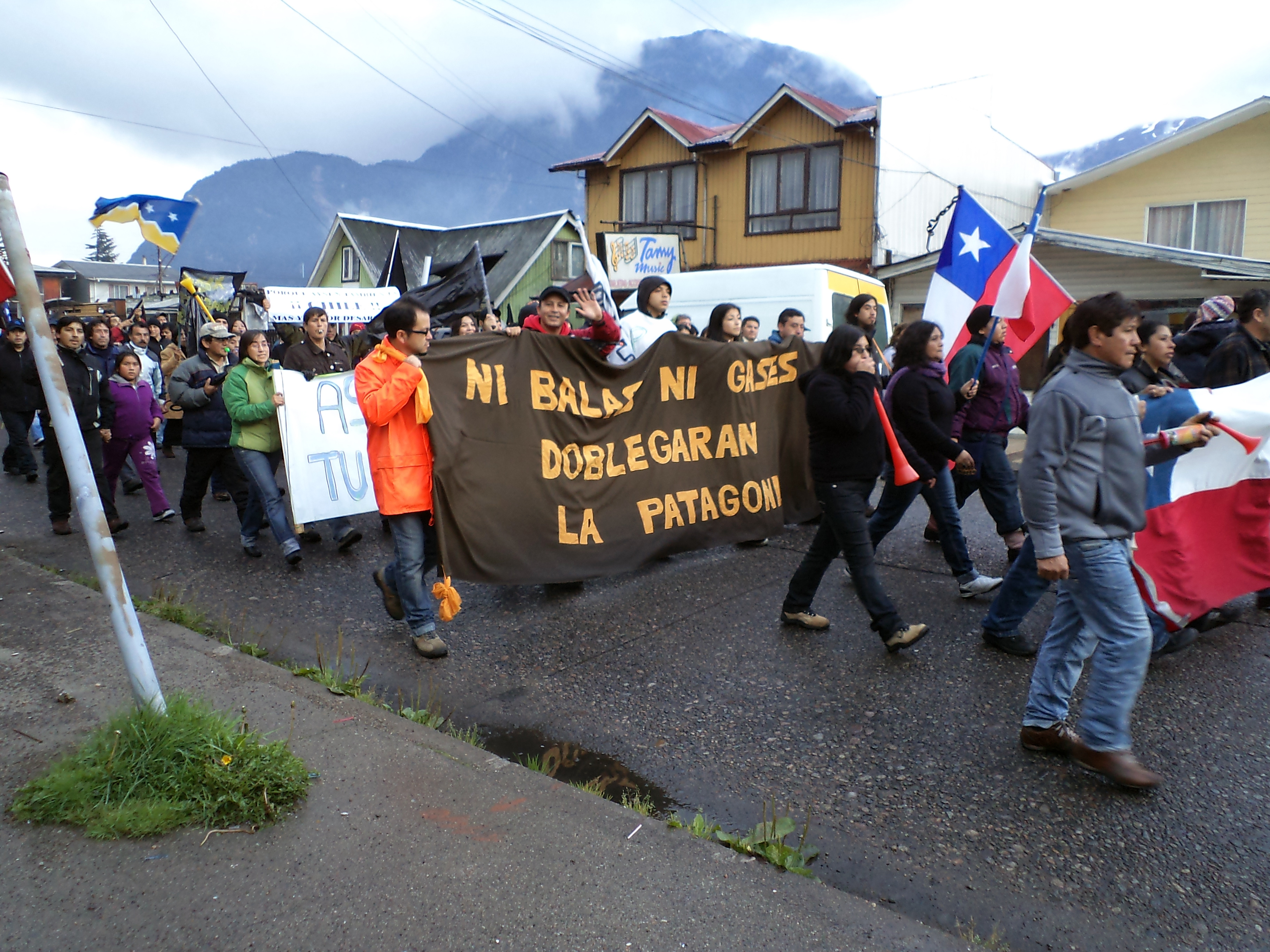
- Protests in Puerto Aysén, Aysén Region.
- Date: February 2012
- Location: Aysén Region, Chile

The 2012 Aysén protests were a series of protests that occurred in Aysén Region in central Chilean Patagonia in February 2012.

== Protests ==
The protests were organized by Movimiento Social por Aysén (Social Movement for Aysén), a leftist organization grouping together 20 other organization including Workers' United Center of Chile, ANEF and Patagonia Sin Represas and local fishermen. The protests centered on demands for subsidies from the national government, even though Aysén already receives a disproportionately high (per capita) level of national subsidies and expenditures for the region. Many of the demands were considered to be contrary to the existing constitution of the country. The protests paralysed air, land, and water transport not only within the region but also into and out of the central Patagonia region, effectively trapping thousands of tourists. Protesters also damaged a Chilean government air ambulance that was being used to evacuate injured people. The protests resulted in hundreds of injuries and several millions of dollars in damage to local industry, personal and commercial property, and public infrastructure. Towards the end of the protests, the national government invoked the national internal security law, which is intended to deal with acts of terrorism against the country.

== Demands ==
Demands included:

- Lowering of prices for gas, petroleum, paraffin/kerosene, LP gas and wood (subsidies)
- Improvements to the healthcare infrastructure of the region
- Regional adjustments to the minimum wage
- The creation of a University based in Aysén Region
- Regionalization of water, agropecuarian and mining resources (contrary to Chilean constitutional law)
- Increased rights and benefits for fishermen
- Regional adjustments in pensions for seniors and the handicapped

There were also support protests for Aysén by leftist organisations in other Chilean cities like Arica, Viña del Mar, Talca, Concepción and Ancud.

== See also ==
- HidroAysén
- 2011–2012 Chilean student protests
- 2011 Magallanes protests
- List of protests in the 21st century
- Eye injury in the 2019–2020 Chilean protests
