= Miodrag Marinović =

Chilean politician

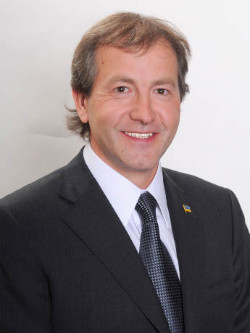
- Official portrait, 2010

Member of the Chamber of Deputies
- In office 11 March 2010 – 11 March 2014
- Preceded by: Rodrigo Álvarez Zenteno
- Succeeded by: Gabriel Boric
- Constituency: Magallanes Region (60 District)

Personal details
- Born: 7 January 1967 (age 59) Punta Arenas, Chile
- Party: Independent
- Spouse: Gabriela Muñoz Rodríguez
- Children: 2
- Education: Federico Santa María Technical University

Miodrag Arturo Marinović Solo de Zaldívar (born 7 January 1967) is a Chilean politician who served as a member of the Chamber of Deputies, representing the former District 60 of the Magallanes Region from 2010 to 2014.

== Early life and family ==
Marinovic was born on 7 January 1967 in the Magallanes region of Chile. He is the son of Miodrag Marinovic, a civil engineer and employee of the National Petroleum Company (ENAP), and Victoria Solo de Zaldívar.

He is married to Gabriela Muñoz Rodríguez and is the father of two children, Constanza and Miodrag.

== Professional career ==
He completed his primary and secondary education at Liceo Salesiano San José in Punta Arenas, graduating in 1984. He continued his studies at the Business School of the Federico Santa María Technical University, graduating in 1989 as a commercial engineer.

In 1990, after a professional training trip to England, he joined Banco O'Higgins as a risk analyst and was later promoted to the Corporate Management division, where he worked as a money desk operator. In 1992, he returned to Magallanes to work at Banco Osorno as a corporate accounts executive.

From 1994 onward, he assumed management of his family's investments in the tourism, livestock, and real estate sectors. In 1995, he began active involvement in trade associations, serving as a business leader within the Chamber of Commerce and the Confederation of Production and Commerce (CPC) of the XII Region. In this capacity, he worked jointly with the Central Unitary Workers' Union (CUT) and neighborhood associations in defense of regional and workers’ interests.

In 2003, after his family acquired the Pecket Harbour estancia, he assumed management of the estate. He has overseen approximately 300,000 hectares in Patagonia, including Cabo Froward and around 90,000 hectares of largely undeveloped land, fjords, glaciers, and islands, with plans for the development of a private natural park.

In 2008, he participated in the commercial management of the newspaper El Pingüino in Punta Arenas.
