= Fernando Echeverría =

Chilean politician (born 1961)

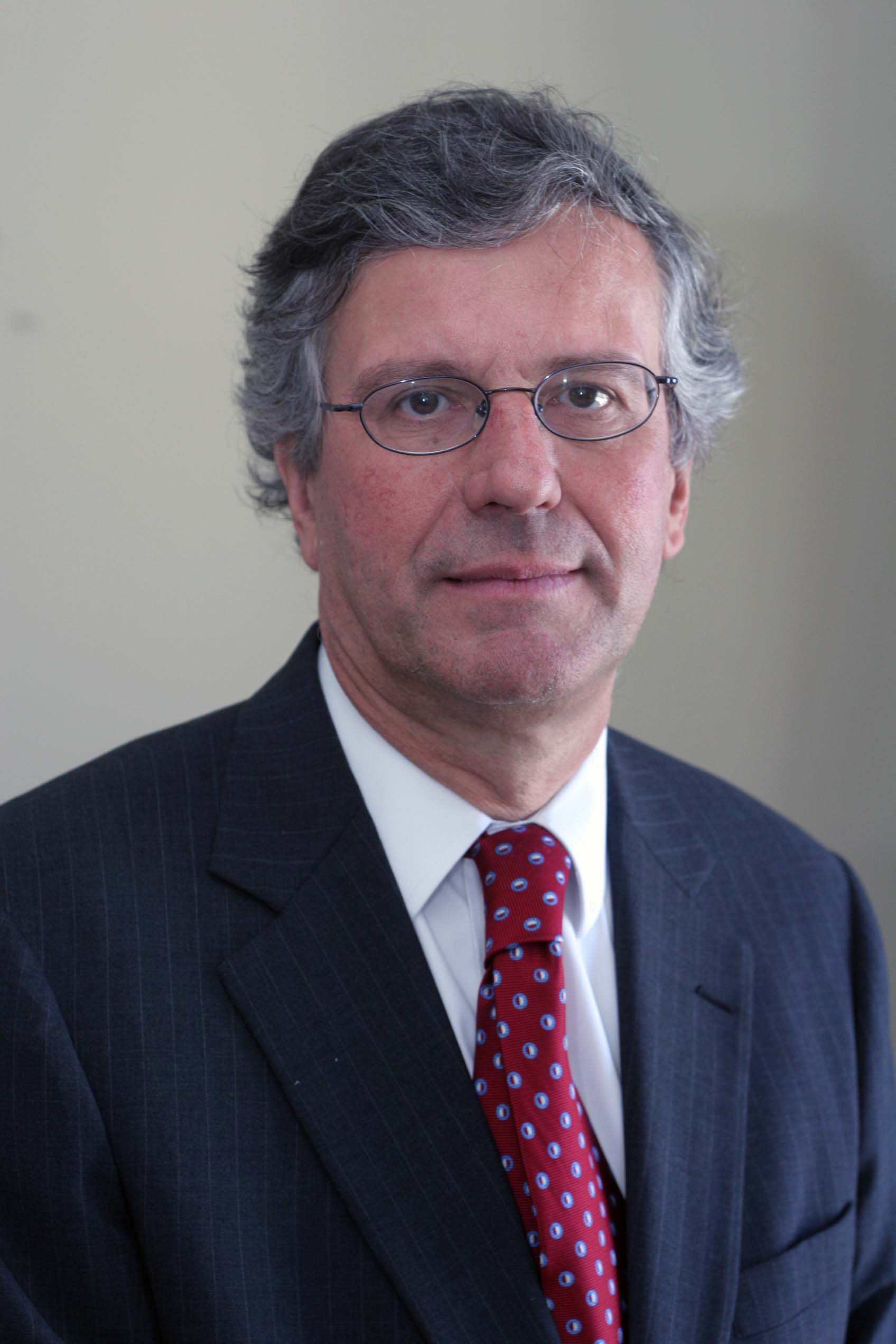

Minister of Energy
- In office 18 July 2011 – 21 July 2011
- President: Sebastián Piñera
- Preceded by: Laurence Golborne
- Succeeded by: Rodrigo Álvarez Zenteno

Intendant of Santiago Metropolitan Region
- In office 11 March 2010 – 18 July 2011
- Preceded by: Igor Garafulic
- Succeeded by: Cecilia Pérez

Personal details
- Born: 4 September 1953 (age 73) Santiago, Chile
- Party: Renovación Nacional
- Spouse: Francisca Alcaíno
- Children: Three
- Education: Pontifical Catholic University of Chile (BS); Stanford University (MS)
- Occupation: Politician entrepreneur
- Profession: Civil engineer

Fernando Echeverría Vial (born 19 November 1961) is a Chilean civil engineer and politician who served as Minister of Energy during the first government of Sebastián Piñera.

== Biography ==
=== Early life and education ===
He studied at Colegio San Ignacio in the Santiago commune of El Bosque and later pursued a degree in civil engineering at the Pontificia Universidad Católica de Chile (PUC) between 1972 and 1978. He later obtained a diploma in business management from the University of Chile.

Although politically independent, those close to him describe him in his youth as opposed to the government of the Popular Unity (1970–1973). It is noted that in that context his stance "clashed" with that of one of his brothers, Bernardo, who at the time was an active socialist militant.

=== Professional career ===
In 1978, shortly after graduating from university, he founded a construction company with two classmates, Francisco Javier Silva and Álvaro Izquierdo. They began by building swimming pools and renovating homes until Pierre Lehmann, one of the owners of the construction firm Delta, commissioned them to build his retreat in Farellones. This was followed by the renovation of the Embassy of Australia in Santiago and branches of Santiago Bank and Banco de Crédito e Inversiones.

In 1982, he faced the severe economic crisis of that year from within one of the industries most affected nationwide. With no projects for a year and a half, he returned to salaried work, joining the Central Bank of Chile. There he met his future wife, Francisca Alcaíno. Three years later, the earthquake in central Chile generated strong demand for construction works, revitalizing the sector, after which he returned to his company.

His involvement in business associations dates back to 1998, when he became vice president of the Contractors Committee of the Chilean Chamber of Construction (CChC). After that experience he remained active within the institution, serving as director, vice president of its affiliate Caja de Compensación Los Andes, and finally president of the trade association between 2002 and 2004, following the first competitive elections in three decades.

His tenure as president was marked by controversy and involvement in what were described as "national issues". First, when he demanded that Minister of Public Works Javier Etcheberry annul a multi-million-peso road tender; later, during the so-called Gate Case, regarding 100 million pesos paid by contractor companies of the MOP for an environmental impact study that had no commercial value. Echeverría publicly described the situation as "unacceptable".

In 2001 he completed the Stanford Executive Program at the business school of Stanford University in the United States.

In December 2004 he unsuccessfully sought the presidency of the Confederation of Production and Commerce.

Among his closest friends are the businesspersons Juan Ignacio Silva, Andrés Santa Cruz, José Cox, and the lawyer and politician Andrés Allamand.

=== Political career ===
As a member of Renovación Nacional (RN), he was appointed in 2010 as Intendant of Santiago Metropolitan Region by the new President of Chile. He left that position in July 2011 to assume office at the Ministry of Energy, where he remained for only three days, citing a potential conflict of interest.

In 2012, as chairman of the board, he led the stock market debut of Echeverría Izquierdo on the Santiago Stock Exchange.
