= Hernán de Solminihac =

Chilean engineer and minister

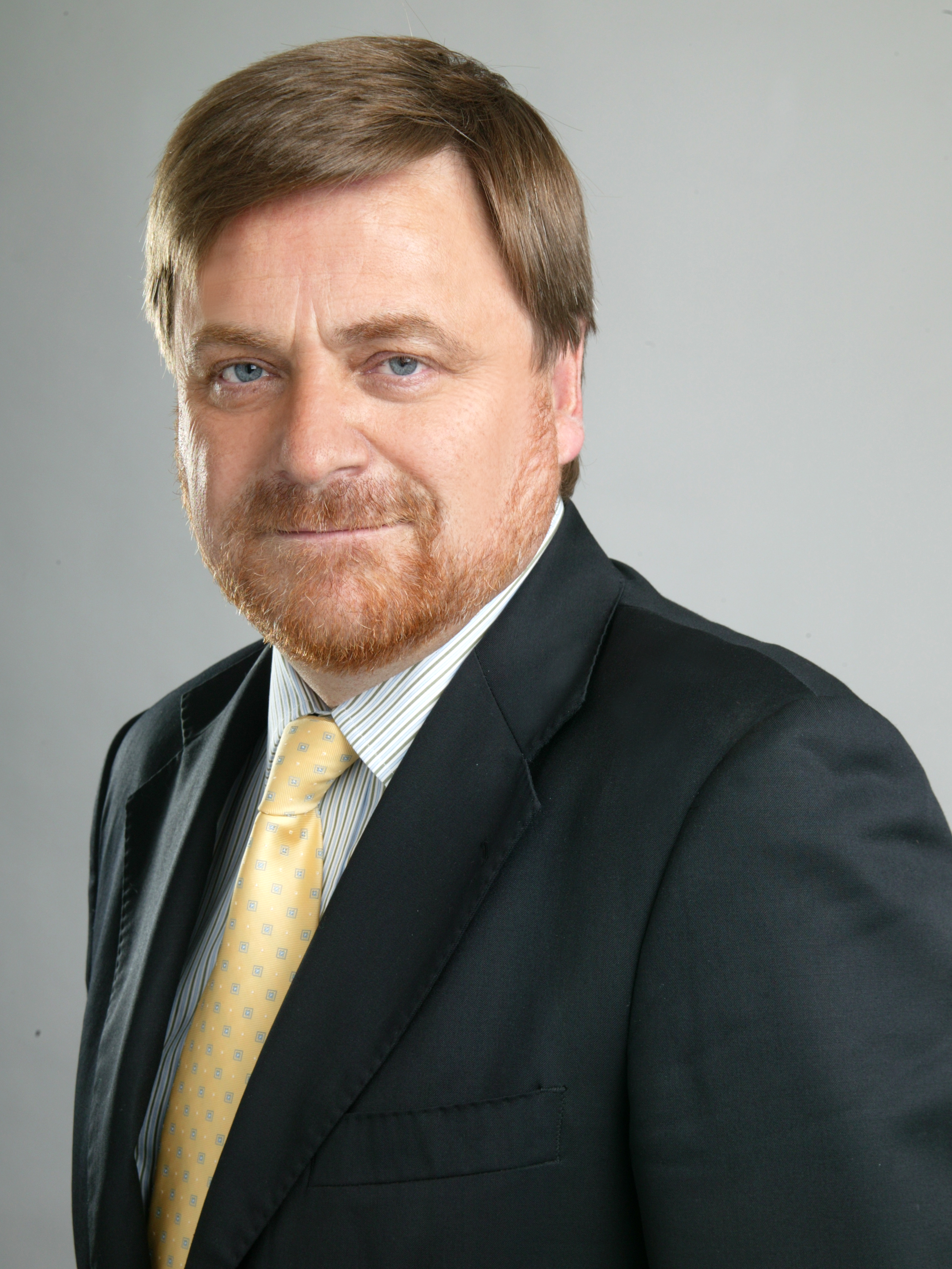

Minister of Public Works
- In office 11 March 2010 – 18 July 2011
- President: Sebastián Piñera
- Preceded by: Sergio Bitar
- Succeeded by: Laurence Golborne

Minister of Mining
- In office 18 July 2011 – 11 March 2014
- President: Sebastián Piñera
- Preceded by: Laurence Golborne
- Succeeded by: Aurora Williams

Personal details
- Born: 11 January 1958 (age 68) Santiago, Chile
- Spouse: Alejandra Aranda
- Children: 3
- Education: Pontifical Catholic University of Chile (BS); University of Texas at Austin (MS)
- Occupation: Politician
- Profession: Civil engineer

Hernán Eduardo de Solminihac Tampier (born 11 January 1958 ) is a Chilean engineer, academic, researcher, and consultant who served as a minister of state during the first administration of President Sebastián Piñera.

He has currently a professor and director of the Department of Construction Engineering and Management at his alma mater, the Pontifical Catholic University of Chile (PUC). He has also served on the boards of Cruzados SADP, Codelco, and Canal del Fútbol (CDF).

== Early life and education ==
De Solminihac is of French descent. He completed his secondary education at The American School of Puerto Montt, the Alianza Francesa school in Osorno, and later at the Instituto Nacional General José Miguel Carrera in Santiago. Among his siblings is Patricio de Solminihac, a senior executive for several decades at Sociedad Química y Minera de Chile (SQM).

He graduated as a civil engineer in construction from the Pontifical Catholic University of Chile in 1982. De Solminihac later pursued graduate studies at the University of Texas at Austin in the United States, earning a master's degree in 1986 and a doctorate in engineering sciences in 1992.

He received the Presidente de la República scholarship and a scholarship from the Organization of American States (OAS) to support his graduate studies.

== Professional career ==
His research has focused primarily on road infrastructure management in Chile and abroad.

At the PUC, he created the road infrastructure management research line and directed the Asphalt Pavement Control and Monitoring Plan carried out for the Directorate of Roads of the Ministry of Public Works, calibrating performance models to Chilean conditions.

He has served as a full professor at the School of Engineering of the PUC and as director of Dictuc (Dirección de Investigaciones Científicas y Tecnológicas de la UC), and has published around one hundred academic articles.

He participated in the development of the strategic plan of the Cámara Chilena de la Construcción.

Following his election as president, Sebastián Piñera appointed him Minister of Public Works in early 2010. At the time of his appointment, he was serving as dean of the Faculty of Engineering of the PUC.

As Minister of Public Works, he addressed the infrastructure damage caused by the 27 February 2010 earthquake, which affected central Chile and resulted in damages exceeding US$1 billion. In July 2011, he was appointed Minister of Mining, being replaced at the Ministry of Public Works by Laurence Golborne.

In October 2022, he was elected president of the Colegio de Ingenieros de Chile.
