= Rodrigo Álvarez Zenteno =

Chilean politician

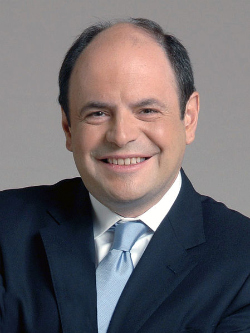

Member of the Constitutional Convention
- In office 4 July 2021 – 4 July 2022
- President: Sebastián Piñera
- Constituency: 28th District

Minister of Energy
- In office 22 July 2011 – 27 March 2012
- Preceded by: Fernando Echeverría
- Succeeded by: Jorge Bunster

Undersecretary of Finances
- In office 11 March 2010 – 22 July 2011
- Preceded by: María Olivia Recart
- Succeeded by: Julio Dittborn

President of the Chamber of Deputies
- In office 11 March 2010 – 22 July 2011
- Preceded by: Francisco Encina
- Succeeded by: Alejandra Sepúlveda

Member of the Chamber of Deputies
- In office 11 March 1998 – 11 March 2010
- Preceded by: Vicente Karelovic
- Succeeded by: Miodrag Marinovic
- Constituency: 60th District

Personal details
- Born: 30 July 1966 (age 60) Punta Arenas, Chile
- Party: Unión Demócrata Independiente
- Other political affiliations: Acción Republicana
- Spouse: Francisca Alcaíno
- Children: 3
- Education: Pontifical Catholic University of Chile; University of Navarra; Harvard University
- Occupation: Politician
- Profession: Lawyer

Rodrigo Álvarez Zenteno (born 30 July 1966) is a Chilean lawyer, academic, and politician.

A member of the Independent Democratic Union, he served as a member of the Chamber of Deputies of Chile for the Magallanes and Chilean Antarctic Region between 1998 and 2010, including as President of the Chamber from 2009 to 2010.

He later served as Minister of Energy between 2011 and 2012 during the first administration of President Sebastián Piñera. Then, he was vice-president of the Constitutional Convention.

== Early life and family ==
Álvarez was born on 30 July 1966 in Punta Arenas, Chile. He is the son of Manuel Álvarez and Lucía Zenteno.

He is married to Pamela Serra Freire and has five children.

== Education and academic career ==
Between 1972 and 1979, Álvarez completed his primary and secondary education at Colegio Miss Sharp and Colegio San José in Punta Arenas, later graduating from Liceo Salesiano San José in 1983.

He studied law at the Pontifical Catholic University of Chile, qualifying as a lawyer on 28 May 1990. In 1993, he obtained a PhD in Law from the University of Navarra, Spain, with a doctoral thesis titled The Venture Capital Financing System: Legal and Business Aspects.

Between 1996 and 1997, he completed a Master of Laws degree at Harvard University.

Álvarez developed an academic career at the Faculty of Law of the Pontifical Catholic University of Chile, where he taught Commercial Law (1993–2009), Tax Law (1994–2000; 2006), and Competition Law (1996; 1998–2006). He also served as academic secretary of the postgraduate and Master’s programs in Business Law at the same institution.

He additionally taught at the Austral University of Chile, University for Development, Finis Terrae University, Adolfo Ibáñez University, University of Atacama, and Alonso Ovalle University.

== Professional career ==
Between 1990 and 2003, Álvarez practiced law and advised companies on tax, commercial, and competition law matters. From 1995 to 1997, he worked in the Legal and Tax Advisory Department of Price Waterhouse.

Between 2000 and 2003, he was a partner at the law firm Passano, Álvarez y Compañía. From 2007 onward, he joined the law firm Pérez de Arce Abogados.

He has served as president of the Association of Food and Beverage Industries of Chile (AB Chile) and as a board member of the Society for Industrial Development of Chile (SOFOFA). In 2017, he presented his candidacy for the presidency of SOFOFA but later withdrew.

== Political career ==
Álvarez began his political activity in 1987 as president of the Student Council of the Faculty of Law at the Pontificia Universidad Católica de Chile. In 1988, he joined the Independent Democratic Union, where he served as vice president of the party’s youth wing.

Between 2006 and 2008, he was a member of the national leadership of the Independent Democratic Union, serving as vice president of the party.

He was elected as a deputy for District No. 60 of the Magallanes and Chilean Antarctic Region, serving three consecutive terms between 1998 and 2010. On 19 March 2009, he was elected President of the Chamber of Deputies, holding the position until 10 March 2010.

In March 2010, Álvarez was appointed Undersecretary of Finance. On 22 July 2011, he was appointed Minister of Energy by President Sebastián Piñera. He resigned from the position on 26 March 2012, a resignation that was accepted by the President.

In the December 2010 parliamentary elections, he ran for re-election as a deputy for District No. 21 of the Metropolitan Region but was not elected.
