= Claudio Huepe =

Chilean politician, engineer and economist

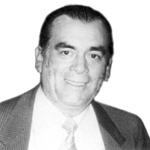

Minister Secretary-General of Government
- In office 11 March 2020 – 6 February 2022
- President: Ricardo Lagos
- Preceded by: Carlos Mladinic
- Succeeded by: Heraldo Muñoz

Personal details
- Born: 25 December 1939 Chillán, Chile
- Died: 11 May 2009 (aged 69) Caracas, Venezuela
- Party: Christian Democratic Party
- Spouse(s): Gilda Minoletti; Susana Schkolnik
- Children: Three (Among them, Claudio)
- Parent(s): Luis Huepe; Marta García
- Profession: Lawyer

Claudio Huepe García (December 25, 1939 – May 11, 2009) was a Chilean politician, engineer and economist, member of the Christian Democrat party, who occupied several government and political positions. During his career, he was the provincial intendant of Arauco, a member of the Chilean Chamber of Deputies, a government minister, and the Chilean ambassador to Venezuela. He was also among the first in his party to reject the 1973 coup by Pinochet and was exiled by the military dictatorship from 1975 until 1984.

The son of Luis Huepe Godoy lebanese immigrant and Marta García Norambuena, renowned businesspeople from Chillán, he studied Industrial Civil Engineering in the Universidad Católica de Chile and later obtained a master in economic development at the Center for Development Economics of Williams College (Williamstown, Massachusetts).

== Beginnings in politics ==
During the government of President Eduardo Frei Montalva, he was named the provincial intendant of the Province of Arauco (1964–1968), the youngest to hold such position, at age of 24. After four years, he resigned to pursue a master in Economic Development in the United States at the Center for Development Economics of the Williams College in Massachusetts. He returned to Chile in 1969, and was soon elected as a representative (member of the Chamber of Deputies) for the province of Arauco (1969–1973) with the support of the PDC (Chilean Christian Democrat Party).

He was reelected in 1973, but his tenure was soon interrupted by the military coup against the democratically elected socialist government of Salvador Allende. Huepe soon expressed publicly his rejection to the coup and its interruption of the Chilean democratic tradition by signing the so-called Statement of the Group of Thirteen. As a consequence of his opposition to the military dictatorship, he was later detained and sent to the political prisoner camps of Tres Álamos and Ritoque for three months. He was then exiled, in 1975, living in England and Venezuela until he was allowed to return to Chile in 1984, as the dictatorship slowly started to open-up politically.

== Return to democracy ==
During his years of exile and after returning to Chile, Claudio Huepe continued to be actively involved in politics, working for the return of democracy. As one of the most left-leaning Christian Democrats (a party that in Chile occupies the political center) he was instrumental in the formation of what later became the Concerted Parties for Democracy; the center-left coalition that defeated the dictatorship and has won all presidential elections since the military rule ended in 1990. With the return to democracy, in 1990, Claudio Huepe was elected again to the Chamber of Deputies, for the same region he had represented before the coup, now District 46 (Lota, Lebu, Arauco, Curanilahue, Los Álamos, Cañete, Contulmo, and Tirúa), with a 35.93% of the votes.

In 1997, he was appointed Undersecretary at the Ministry General Secretariat of Government (1997–2000) by President Eduardo Frei Ruiz-Tagle. In 2000, the newly elected President Ricardo Lagos named him Minister Secretary-General of Government (2000–2002), While he succeeded as a cabinet-member in completing several important initiatives such as the Chilean Press Law or the Freedom of Religion Law, and in modernizing the image of the Chilean government, his work as the government spokesperson (an additional responsibility of this position) was considered opaque. He was replaced in 2002 by the Heraldo Muñoz, of the Socialist Party.

In 2005, he ran again as a candidate for the Chamber of Deputies to represent a different zone (District 41), but was not elected. He was later named Ambassador to Venezuela by President Michelle Bachelet, but presented his resignation in mid-2007, after accepting the political responsibility for unveiling a private conversation with the President on the Venezuelan television channel teleSur regarding the 2006 Chilean vote for the United Nations Security Council.

Claudio Huepe died of a heart attack on May 11, 2009, while visiting Caracas, Venezuela.
