= Carlos González Márquez =

Chilean politician

President of the Radical Party of Chile
- In office 4 June 1991 – 14 April 1994
- Preceded by: Enrique Silva Cimma

Member of the Senate of Chile
- In office 11 March 1990 – 11 March 1994
- Preceded by: District created
- Succeeded by: Carlos Ominami
- Constituency: 6th Circumscription

Personal details
- Born: 11 June 1930 Iquique, Chile
- Died: 25 September 2015 (aged 85) Santiago, Chile
- Party: Radical Party; Radical Social Democrat Party
- Spouse: Silvia Larraín
- Children: Three
- Education: University of Chile (LL.B)
- Occupation: Politician
- Profession: Lawyer

Carlos Rubén González Márquez (11 June 1930 – 25 September 2015) is a Chilean politician who served as a senator.

He was a member of the Country Club and the Chilean Bar Association. He also served as president of the Circle of Sports Journalists and was a member of the Commission for the Monument to Luis Bossay Leiva in Valparaíso.

== Biography ==
=== Family and youth ===
He was born in Iquique on 11 July 1930, the son of Fernando González and Ferminia Márquez. In July 1953, he married Sylvia Larraín Talloni, with whom he had three children: Patricia, Cecilia, and Santiago, who later served as Minister of Mining during the first government of President Michelle Bachelet. He died in Santiago on 25 September 2015.

=== Professional career ===
He completed his primary education in Iquique and his secondary education at the José Abelardo Núñez Higher Normal School in Santiago, qualifying as a primary school teacher. He later entered the School of Law of the University of Chile, obtaining a degree in Legal and Social Sciences with a thesis entitled “Inheritance Law and the Minor”. He was admitted to the bar in 1963.

In his professional career as a teacher, he served between 1950 and 1953 as a teacher and inspector at the San Bernardo High School; from 1953 to 1963 as principal of Primary School No. 250 in Santiago; and from 1963 to 1970 as a professor of Commercial Law at the Evening Commercial Institute No. 2.

He also pursued a career in sports journalism, beginning at Radio Corporación. He later worked at Radio Agricultura, Radio Prat, and for ten years at Radio Minería; from 1968 onward, he worked at Radio Cooperativa. In this capacity, he covered three Basketball World Championships and the FIFA World Cups held in Chile and England, traveling on journalistic assignments throughout South America and Mexico.

He also practiced law independently.

=== Political career ===
He began his political activities in 1946 after joining the Radical Party of Chile. In 1953, he was elected a leader of the Santiago Teachers’ Union, serving in that role for three years.

In 1963, he joined the National Statistics and Census Directorate, where he served as a legal officer. In 1972, he became Chief of Staff to the Minister of Justice, Jorge Tapia Valdés, and in the same year was appointed Intendant of Valparaíso during the government of President Salvador Allende. In May 1973, he was constitutionally accused, and the accusation was upheld by the Senate of Chile on 14 June 1973, resulting in his removal from office in accordance with Article 42 of the Constitution then in force.

At the time of the 1973 military coup, he was serving as president of Banco Curicó.

After the coup, he returned to party leadership within the Radical Party, rebuilding the Department of Radical Lawyers and later the Front of Professionals and Technicians. In 1979, he assumed the National Directorate of the party; in 1983, he was elected Secretary General; and in March 1990, he became vice-president of the party. He also participated in the founding of the Center for Research and Study of Democracy and Socialism (CIDES).

In the parliamentary elections of 14 December 1989, he ran for the Senate of Chile representing the Radical Party within the Concertación coalition for the Fifth Senatorial District (Cordillera), Valparaíso Region, for the 1990–1994 term. He was elected with the highest vote share in the district, obtaining 72,721 votes (21.33% of valid votes). In the 1993 parliamentary elections, he sought re-election but was not elected.

On 23 May 2000, he was appointed by President Ricardo Lagos as Director of the San Antonio Port Company.
