= Ricardo Raineri =

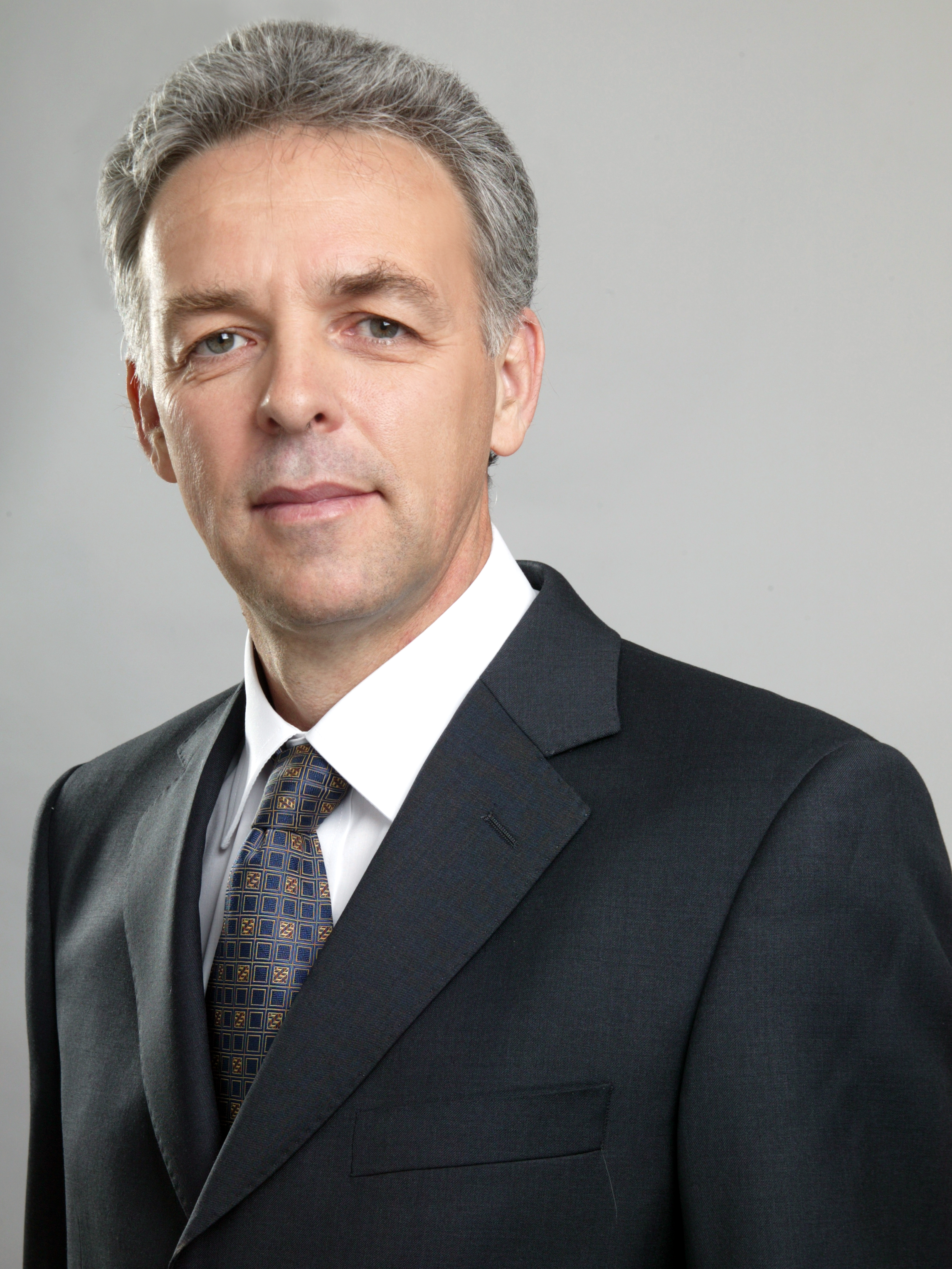

Minister of Energy
- In office 11 March 2010 – 14 January 2011
- President: Sebastián Pinera
- Preceded by: Marcelo Tokman
- Succeeded by: Laurence Golborne

Personal details
- Born: 25 November 1961 (age 64) Santiago, Chile
- Party: Independent
- Education: Pontifical Catholic University of Chile; University of Minnesota
- Occupation: Economist, Academic, Researcher, Consultant
- Website: RicardoRaineri

Ricardo Jorge Raineri Bernain (born 25 November 1961) is an economist, academic, researcher, consultant, and politician. On February 9, 2010, Chile's then President Sebastián Piñera nominated him to the Ministry of Energy.

== Biography ==
Raineri completed his studies at the Adventist high school in Santiago, Chile. He went on to major in Business at the Pontifical Catholic University of Chile in 1987. He completed his Masters of Arts in 1991 and Ph.D. in 1993 at the University of Minnesota. His studies concentrated on industrial organization and regulation, and monetary economics. He is married and the father of three children.

== Career ==
Upon his return to his country Chile, Raineri joined the Department of Industrial Engineering and of the School of Engineering Systems at his Alma mater, the Pontifical Catholic University of Chile, as a professor and researcher. He would later become the director of the department between April 1998 and April 2002. He was also managing director and economic coordinator in the Department of Industrial Engineering and Systems between March 1994 and October 1995.

He collaborated with Sebastián Piñera as a coordinator in the area of energy of the group Tantauco.

In 2012, he was appointed as alternate executive director of the World Bank Group representing Argentina, Bolivia, Chile, Paraguay, Peru, and Uruguay.

In 2012, he was elected by experts around the world for a period of two years as vice president for academic affairs of the International Association for Energy Economics. In 2014 was re-elected for a second two-year term (2015–16). In 2015 he was elected as IAEE president-elect for 2016 and as IAEE president for 2017.

== Politics ==
On February 9, 2010, Chilean president Sebastián Piñera named him to his cabinet as Minister of Energy.

His achievements leading the Ministry of Energy were presented on Tuesday, January 5, 2011, in the Montt Varas Hall of the Palacio de La Moneda. In this public hearing, he highlighted community support projects, the promotion of non-conventional renewable energies, security of supply and energy efficiency, among others.
