= Chilean school uniform =

School dress codes in Chile

The Chilean school uniform has since the early-1930s been used by the majority of students in Chilean schools by the vast majority of primary and secondary educational institutions.

== History ==
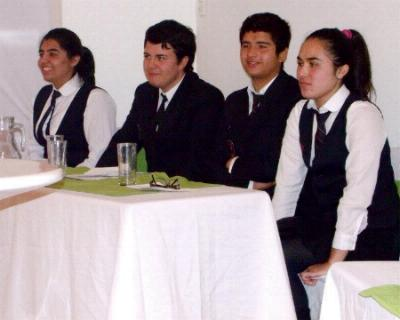
Chilean school uniform, known as the “penguin uniform” due to its monochrome colors

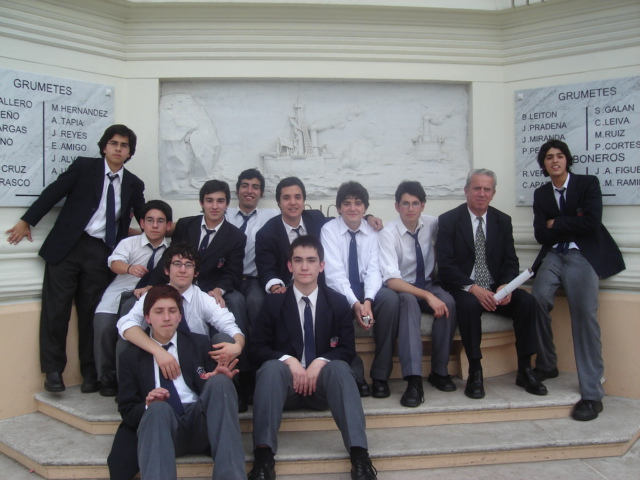
Students from the National Institute wearing the traditional Chilean school uniform

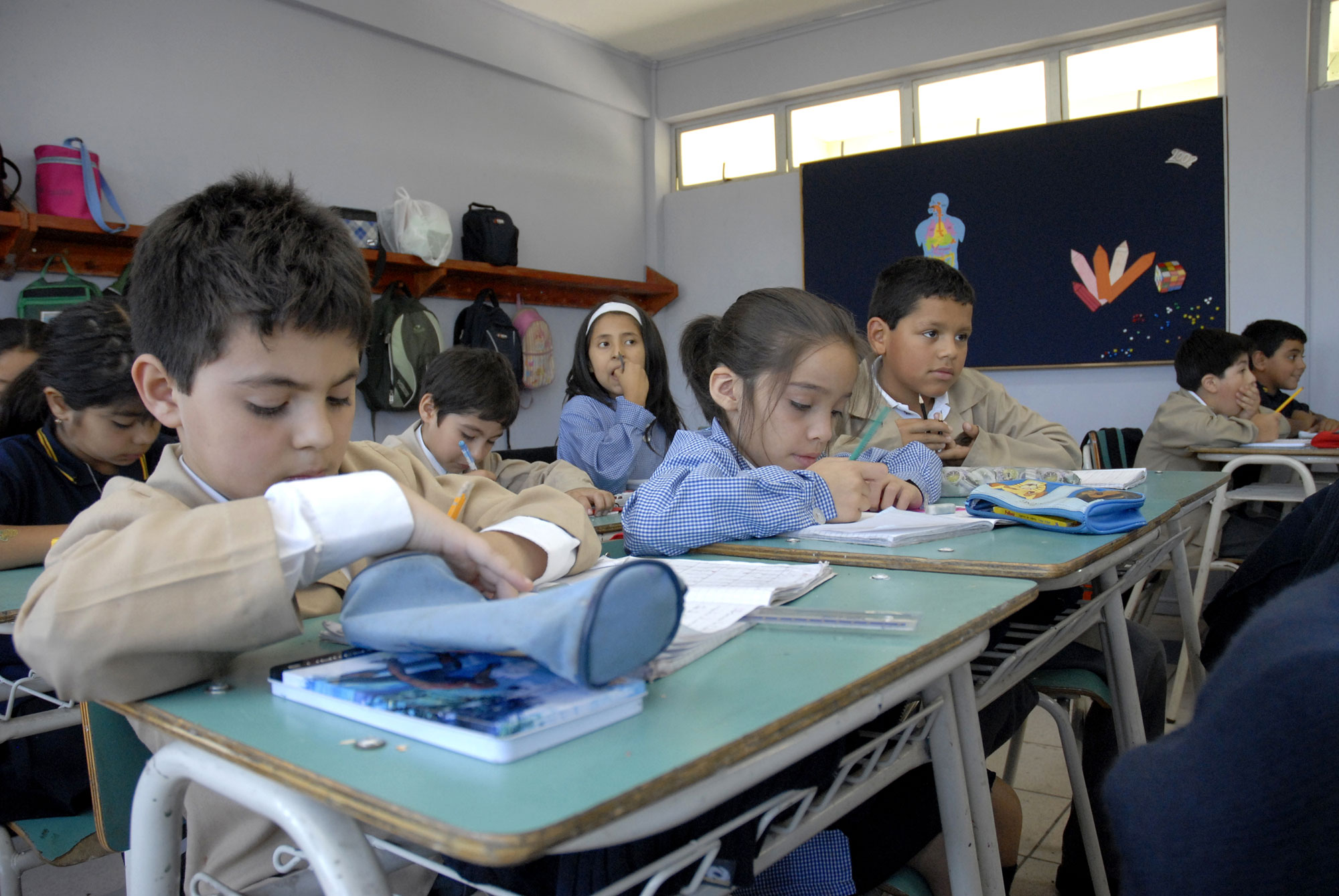
Schoolchildren working in white and light blue tartan aprons (girls) and light brown smocks (boys)

Until 1930, it was not very common for schools and colleges to impose a uniform on their students. For example, state-run high schools did not require uniforms, although some, such as the National Institute, required students to wear formal attire. It was during the government of Carlos Ibáñez del Campo that primary and secondary educational institutions were required to establish uniforms for students. The reasons for this were varied, but the main one was an attempt to eliminate discrimination and promote education in a country with a considerable number of children not attending school. Although the latter did not succeed, the uniform became a distinguishing feature between school and university education, which did not accept the imposition of such a measure. During the administration of Eduardo Frei Montalva (1964-1970), and as part of the educational reform implemented during his administration, a unified school uniform was established for all educational institutions, whether public or private. This measure remained in place, with some modifications, until 1995.

Although according to Chilean law, no school can require the use of school uniforms, this is enforced in most schools, both public and private. The most traditional uniform for boys consisted of a white shirt (although there are some exceptions in light blue), a navy blue jacket, and gray pants, while the girls' uniform consisted of a white shirt and a sleeveless navy blue dress called a jumper. Navy blue sweaters and socks of the same color were added to this outfit for both sexes. The colors of this uniform (white, navy blue, and gray) have given Chilean students the nickname “penguins,” a name that became popular during the so-called Revolución de los pingüinos (Penguin Revolution), a series of secondary protests in 2006.

In lower grades, the uniform traditionally includes a smock for boys and an apron for girls, which are similar to lab coats. The smock is usually light brown (or coffee-colored), and the girls' apron is white and light blue tartan (or checkered), or both garments are white. In the past, students up to the age of 14 were distinguished by wearing knee-length pants, a custom that has now disappeared.

Since the mid-1990s, traditional school uniforms have gradually begun to disappear, mainly in private and subsidized schools, which have preferred to use their own designs and colors that allow students to identify with the institution. Jumpers have given way to skirts of various shades and pleats, and shirts have begun to be replaced by T-shirts or polo shirts, especially during the summer.

However, there are some schools that have kept the traditional uniform unchanged. In recent years, several schools that use uniforms with distinctive colors have resumed the use of white shirts or blouses with navy blue jackets or, in some cases, other official colors of their school, especially for ceremonies and official events.

== Contemporary uniform ==
The contemporary Chilean uniform generally reflects broader global trends in school uniforms. For boys, the uniform is usually a white dress shirt and long pants in shades ranging from light gray to black. Ties may be included.

For girls, the uniform usually consists of a short-sleeved polo shirt or long-sleeved shirt, a skirt, and short school leggings that must be worn under the skirt. Knee-high socks are a common optional item. Polo shirts can vary in color, usually white or blue, but dress shirts are always white. Skirts mostly follow the design that has emerged as the main stylistic paradigm for secondary school girls in the Western world and parts of Asia, which is the pleated tartan skirt that originated in Catholic school uniforms and ultimately derives from the Scottish kilt. The color of the tartan on the pleated skirt is usually navy blue, green, burgundy, or light gray. School leggings are usually navy blue, short enough to always be hidden inside the skirt, and made of cotton (alternatively, they may be biker leggings that include Lycra, known as “bike shorts” in English). (Note: Although they may look like children's boxer shorts, they are not intended as underwear.)

== Discussions about the use of uniforms ==
From time to time, the use of uniforms is criticized, based on the difficulty that low-income parents would have in obtaining one. However, compared to the opposite option of not wearing uniforms, international experience shows that students compete for expensive clothing, which would put the poorest children at a disadvantage. Another argument is that students can be identified by their distinctive badges or uniforms.

Arguments against this are that schools should teach minors not to discriminate, so that every child can wear the clothes they like.
