= Susana Jiménez Schuster =

Chilean Energy minister

Susana Jiménez
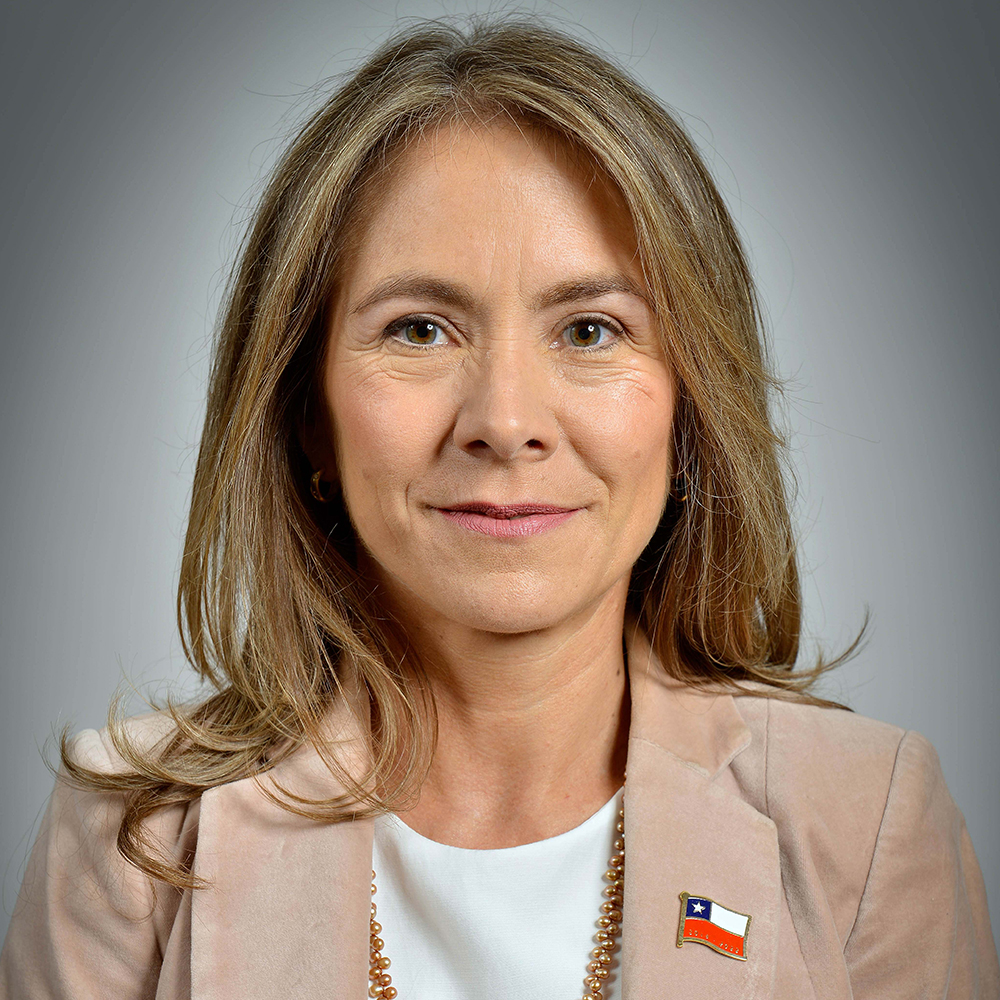
- Official portrait (2018)

Minister of Energy
- In office 11 March 2018 – 13 July 2019
- President: Sebastián Piñera
- Preceded by: Andrés Rebolledo
- Succeeded by: Juan Carlos Jobet

Personal details
- Born: 26 July 1969 (age 57) Santiago, Chile
- Party: Close to centre-right
- Parent(s): Guillermo Jiménez Ormeño; Eveline Schuster Korpitsch
- Education: Pontifical Catholic University of Chile; Universidad del Desarrollo (MA)
- Occupation: Politician
- Profession: Lawyer

Susana Alejandra Isabel Jiménez Schuster (born 26 July 1969) is a Chilean politician and business manager.

From 1995 to 1997, Jiménez Schuster worked as an economist in the Central Bank of Chile's Research Division.

After her spell during the second government of Sebastián Piñera (2018–2022), she assumed on 28 May 2020 as vice-president of Sociedad de Fomento Fabril (SOFOFA). Likewise, Jiménez Schuster also arrived Soprole's board in April 2020.

== Professional career ==
She began her professional career as an economist at the Research Division of the Central Bank of Chile between 1995 and 1997. In 1999 she served as an economic assistant at the representation office of the Ministry of Finance of Chile in New York. Between 2000 and 2002 she was Head of Research at Zahler & Co. consulting firm. She later worked at P. Rojas y Asociados as Associate Economist, becoming a partner in 2009.

She subsequently joined the Advisory Council of the Ministry of the Environment and was a member of the National Fisheries Council and of the Civil Society Council of the National Energy Commission. In parallel, she was a professor at the Institute of Economics of the Pontifical Catholic University of Chile.

In May 2010 she joined the think tank Libertad y Desarrollo (LyD) as senior economist, overseeing studies related to regulation and competition policy, environment, water resources, energy, telecommunications and fisheries. In January 2017 she became deputy director of LyD.

On 11 March 2018 she joined the second administration of Sebastián Piñera as Minister of Energy—becoming the first woman to hold that position. She left office on 13 June 2019 during a cabinet reshuffle and was replaced by Juan Carlos Jobet. From 24 June 2019 she served as presidential adviser on regulatory policies.

After leaving the ministry, she was appointed by the government as a director of BancoEstado. Since April 2020 she has served on the board of Soprole and in May 2020 she assumed as vice president of the Society for Industrial Development (SOFOFA).

In December 2024, she became president of the Confederation of Production and Commerce (CPC), becoming the first woman to hold the position.
