= Laurence Golborne =

Chilean engineer and entrepreneur

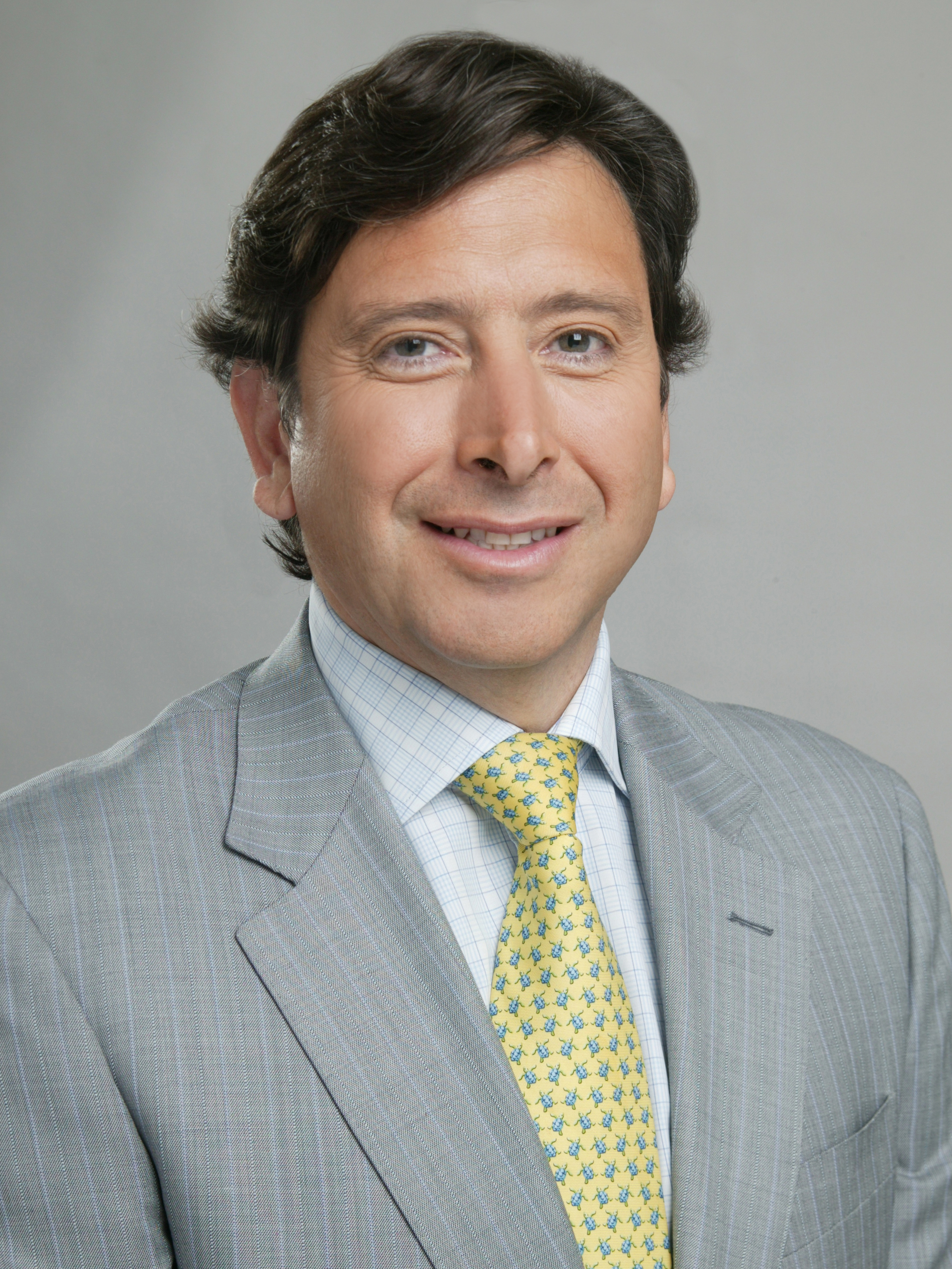
- Laurence Golborne Riveros

Mining Minister of Chile
- In office March 11, 2010 – July 18, 2011
- Preceded by: Santiago González Larraín
- Succeeded by: Hernán de Solminihac

Energy Minister of Chile
- In office January 16, 2011 – July 18, 2011
- Preceded by: Ricardo Raineri
- Succeeded by: Fernando Echeverría

Personal details
- Born: Laurence Nelson Golborne Riveros; July 11, 1961 (age 65) Santiago, Chile
- Party: no political party
- Spouse: Carolina Reinoso
- Children: Six
- Education: Pontifical Catholic University of Chile (B.S.); Stanford University and Northwestern University
- Occupation: Civil engineer

Laurence Nelson Golborne Riveros (born Lorence Nelson Golborne Riveros, Santiago, July 11, 1961) is a Chilean engineer and entrepreneur. He was minister of public works until November 7, 2012, when he announced his decision to run for President of Chile. He previously had been bi-minister of Mining and Energy in the administration of President Sebastián Piñera. He withdrew from the presidential campaign on April 29, 2013, after two consecutive public scandals.

== Family and education ==
Golborne grew up in Maipú, a working-class commune in the south-west of the capital Santiago, where his father, Wilfred, a merchant of English descent developed his entrepreneurial streak through an ironmonger business.

The youngest of six children in the family, as a teenager Golborne became involved in meetings that the conservative National Party was organizing against the Popular Unity government. Nevertheless, his family situation is described as diverse, with members sympathetic to both the left and the right.

Golborne graduated from the Instituto Nacional José Miguel Carrera, and then was admitted to the Pontifical Catholic University of Chile, where he pursued civil engineering. In university he was honored as the best graduate in his class. He is married to Carolina Reinoso, after having previously divorced Karin Oppermann. Later, he studied business administration at Northwestern and Stanford universities in the United States.

Golborne is an Agnostic.

== Government career ==
Golborne was appointed Minister of Mining on March 11, 2010 by President Sebastián Piñera. As minister, he oversaw the 2010 Copiapó mining accident rescue operations. His management of the rescue operation resulted in his becoming the most popular politician in Chile.

On January 14, 2011 Golborne was designated Minister of Energy by president Piñera. He was sworn in on January 16, 2011.

In July 2011, Golborne was appointed minister of public works. On November 7, 2012 he announced his candidacy in the 2013 Chilean presidential election. He withdrew from the presidential campaign on April 29, 2013, after two consecutive public scandals.

In July 2016, Golborne was charged by the Chilean government prosecutor for tax offenses.

== In popular culture ==
Actor Rodrigo Santoro portrays Golborne in the 2015 film The 33, directed by Patricia Riggen.
