= Marcela Hernando =

Chilean politician (born 1960)

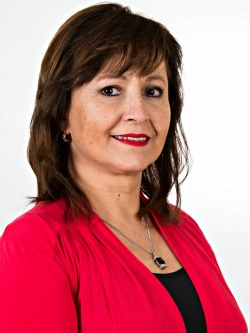
- Hernando in 2018

Member of the Chamber of Deputies
- Incumbent
- Assumed office 11 March 2026
- Constituency: 3rd District
- In office 11 March 2018 – 11 March 2022
- Preceded by: District created
- In office 11 March 2014 – 11 March 2018
- Preceded by: Pedro Araya Guerrero
- Succeeded by: District dissolved
- Constituency: 4th District

Minister of Mining
- In office 11 March 2022 – 2025
- President: Gabriel Boric
- Preceded by: Juan Carlos Jobet
- Succeeded by: Aurora Williams

Mayor of Antofagasta
- In office 6 December 2008 – 6 December 2012
- Preceded by: Gonzalo Dantagnan Vergara
- Succeeded by: Jaime Araya Guerrero

Intendant of the Antofagasta Region
- In office 11 March 2006 – 19 December 2007
- President: Michelle Bachelet
- Preceded by: Jorge Molina Cárcamo
- Succeeded by: Cristián Rodríguez Salas

Regional Ministerial Secretary of Health of the Antofagasta Region
- In office March 2005 – June 2005
- President: Ricardo Lagos

Personal details
- Born: 12 February 1960 (age 66) Santiago, Chile
- Party: Party for Democracy (1987−2008); Independent (2008−2012); Radical Social Democratic Party (2013−2018); Radical Party (2018−present)
- Education: University of Chile (BA in Medicine); University of Paris (MA in Public Health); Catholic University of the North (PgD in Business Administration); University of Barcelona (MA in Marketing; Adolfo Ibáñez University (MA in Management and Public Policies)
- Occupation: Politician
- Profession: Physician; Public Administrator; Business administrator

Marcela Ximena Hernando Pérez (born 12 February 1960) is a Chilean politician and physician who served as Minister of Mining from March 11, 2022 to August 16, 2023.

== Biography ==
=== Family and youth ===
She was born in Santiago on 12 February 1960. She is the daughter of Sergio Enrique Hernando Ferre and Elia del Carmen Pérez Bobadilla.

She is married to Marco Alberto González Vallejos and is the mother of three children.

=== Professional career ===
She completed her secondary education at Liceo María Auxiliadora in Santiago in 1976.

In 1979, she entered the Medicine program at the University of Chile, graduating in 1985 with the degree of Medical Surgeon. In 1986, she settled in the city of Antofagasta, where she devoted herself to professional medical practice.

In 1992, she began postgraduate studies in Public Health at the Xavier Bichat Faculty of the University of Paris, France, while simultaneously undertaking advanced training in Economic Evaluation of Health Programs at the International Child Center in Paris.

In 1996, she completed a diploma in Organization of Community Medical Services and Multiple-Victim Disaster Management at the International Histadrut Institute in Israel.

Between 1997 and 1998, she pursued a Master’s degree in Business Administration at the Catholic University of the North. From 1998 to 1999, she attended the Master’s program in Public Management at the University of Barcelona, C&S Soluciona, and IEDE Spain, while also participating in the State Modernization Program.

Between 2002 and 2003, she completed a Master’s degree in Public Management and Public Policy at Adolfo Ibáñez University. In 2004, she took part in a diploma program in Planning and Management of Disaster Prevention and Response at the War Academy.

== Political career ==
After settling in Antofagasta in 1986, she worked as a general physician at the Corvallis and Centro Sur health centers. In 1987, she was appointed director of the Central Oriente Health Center and concurrently served as a physician in the Bronchopulmonary Service of the Regional Hospital of Antofagasta.

In 1990, she was appointed Director of Primary Care of the Antofagasta Regional Health Service, and in 1994 became Deputy Director of the Antofagasta Health Service. That same year, she was elected secretary and later vice-president of the Antofagasta Regional Chapter of the Medical Association of Chile.

Between 2002 and February 2005, she served as director of the Antofagasta Health Service. In parallel, she acted as interim Regional Ministerial Secretary of Health (Seremi), assuming the position permanently on 1 March 2005. In June of that year, she was appointed director of the Antofagasta Health Services by President Ricardo Lagos Escobar.

On 11 March 2006, she assumed office as Intendant of the Antofagasta Region, having been appointed by President Michelle Bachelet. She remained in office until 1 December 2007.

In 2008, she resigned from the Party for Democracy (PPD). That same year, she ran as an independent candidate for mayor of Antofagasta and was elected with 46,668 votes, equivalent to 51.42% of valid votes cast.

In the 2012 municipal elections, she sought re-election but was not elected, obtaining 21,340 votes (29.11% of valid votes). On 16 November 2012, following her electoral defeat, she resigned early from her mayoral term in order to run for the Chamber of Deputies.

In February 2013, she joined the Radical Social Democratic Party (PRSD). In August 2013, she participated in the Nueva Mayoría primaries and was selected as a candidate for Deputy for District No. 4, Antofagasta Region. In December 2013, she was elected Deputy with the highest vote share, obtaining 27,226 votes (24.52% of valid votes), representing the PRSD.

In the parliamentary elections of November 2017, she was re-elected Deputy for the new District No. 3 of the Antofagasta Region, representing the Radical Social Democratic Party within the La Fuerza de la Mayoría pact, obtaining 14,817 votes (9.13% of valid votes).

In the parliamentary elections held on 21 November 2021, she ran as a candidate for the Senate for the 3rd Constituency, Antofagasta Region, but was not elected, obtaining 14,649 votes (7.82% of valid votes).

On 21 January 2022, she was appointed Minister of Mining by President-elect Gabriel Boric. She held the position from 11 March 2022 until 18 August 2023.

On 29 July 2024, she registered her candidacy for Governor of the Antofagasta Region representing the Radical Party. After obtaining 18.90% of the vote in the elections held on 26 and 27 October 2024, she advanced to a second round on 24 November, but was not elected.
