= Diego Pardow =

Chilean politician

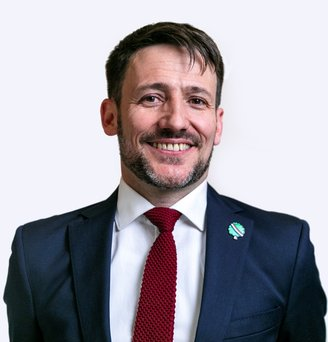

Minister of Energy
- In office 6 September 2022 – 16 October 2025
- President: Gabriel Boric
- Preceded by: Claudio Huepe Minoletti
- Succeeded by: Álvaro García Hurtado

Personal details
- Born: 1 January 1981 (age 45) Santiago, Chile
- Party: Democratic Revolution (2012−2016); Social Convergence (2019−present)
- Other political affiliations: Autonomist Movement (2016−2018)
- Relatives: Rodrigo Pardow (brother); Mariana Loyola (sister-in-law)
- Education: University of Chile (LL.B); University of California, Berkeley (MA, 2011) (Ph.D., 2014)
- Occupation: Politician
- Profession: Lawyer

Diego Gonzalo Pardow Lorenzo (Santiago, March 23, 1980) is a Chilean lawyer and politician, a member of the Social Convergence (CS) party. From September 6, 2022 to October 16, 2025, he served as the Minister of Energy in his country, under the government of President Gabriel Boric.

== Early life and education ==
Pardow was born on 23 March 1980, in Santiago, Chile. He is the grandson (on his mother's side) of Spanish immigrants who arrived on the SS Winnipeg. His parents, Gilberto Álvaro Pardow Smith and Beatriz Lorenzo Gómez de la Serna, were exiled during the military dictatorship of General Augusto Pinochet. In 1989, he returned to Chile from Spain. He completed his undergraduate studies in legal sciences at the University of Chile in 2007, and was admitted as a lawyer before the Supreme Court in the same year. Subsequently, he pursued a Master's degree in law at the University of California, Berkeley, in the United States in 2011, and obtained his doctorate in 2014.

== Professional career ==
Pardow worked as a legal advisor at the General Directorate of International Economic Relations (DGREI) of the Ministry of Foreign Affairs from 2007 to 2008, during the first government of President Michelle Bachelet.

Subsequently, Pardow held positions as a professor of civil law at both the Adolfo Ibáñez University and the University of Chile from 2008 to 2010. Additionally, he taught Economic Analysis of Law at the University of California from 2012 to 2013 and later became a professor of Economics at the University of Chile in 2016. In 2017 and 2018, he was honored with the "Edgardo Buscaglia Award" for outstanding empirical research by the Latin American and Caribbean Law and Economics Association (ALACDE).

Pardow also worked as a consultant for the Inter-American Development Bank (IDB) on matters related to infrastructure regulation. Furthermore, he served as the executive president of the independent think tank Espacio Público from 1 November 2019, to 3 June 2021.

== Political career ==
As a member of the Social Convergence party since 2019, Pardow played a pivotal role as the coordinator of Gabriel Boric's campaign in the 2021 presidential election. Boric emerged victorious in the election and began his term as president from 2022 to 2026. On September 6, 2022, Boric carried out his first cabinet reshuffle, appointing him as the Minister of Energy, succeeding Claudio Huepe Minoletti in the role.

On October 16, 2025 Pardow resigned amid a scandal over errors in billing electricity accounts.

He is the longest-serving energy minister since the ministry was created.
