= Marcelo Tokman =

Chilean politician

Minister of Energy
- In office 1 February 2010 – 11 March 2010
- President: Michelle Bachelet
- Preceded by: Office created
- Succeeded by: Ricardo Raineri

Personal details
- Born: 8 June 1967 (age 59) Oxford, England
- Party: Party for Democracy
- Spouse: Paula Herrera
- Children: 2
- Parent(s): Víctor Eduardo Tokman Spavosky; Olga Ramos
- Education: University of Chile (MA); University of California, Berkeley (BA)
- Occupation: Politician
- Profession: Economist

Marcelo Tokman Ramos (born 8 June 1967) is a Chilean economist who served as minister during the first government of Michelle Bachelet (2006–2010).

== Biography ==
He was born in England while his father, Víctor Edgardo Tokman Sapovsky, an Argentine-born Jewish economist who would later serve as an adviser to former Chilean president Ricardo Lagos, was pursuing doctoral studies at the University of Oxford. His mother is Olga Elena Ramos Partarrieu, a librarian and painter.

He is the brother of Andrea and Carla Tokman, both prominent economists.

He earned a degree in business administration with a specialization in economics from the Pontifical Catholic University of Chile. He also holds a Ph.D. in economics from the University of California, Berkeley, in the United States.

Between 1991 and 1993, he served as a macroeconomic adviser at the Ministry of Finance. Between 1997 and 1998, he worked as a researcher at CIEPLAN and as adviser to the director and head of studies of the Budget Office. From 2002 to 2006, he served as Coordinator of Economic Policy at the Ministry of Finance, and from March 2006 to March 2007 as General Coordinator of Advisers to the ministry.

He has taught economics at the Institute of Economics and the Master's Program in Economics of the Pontifical Catholic University of Chile, public finance in the Master of Public Management program at the Adolfo Ibáñez University, and health economics in the MBA program at Andrés Bello University.

He has published numerous academic articles, including contributions to the Center for Public Studies (CEP), Fundación Expansiva, the Revista Economía Chilena of the Central Bank of Chile, and the OECD's Journal on Budgeting.

His tenure in government was marked by the energy crisis caused by reduced natural gas supplies from Argentina, below-average rainfall, and the sharp increase in international petroleum prices, particularly through mid-2008. In response, the ministry implemented an ambitious national energy-saving program, which enabled the country to avoid residential electricity rationing of the kind experienced during a similar crisis in the late 1990s.

In 2013, he joined the policy team of independent presidential pre-candidate Andrés Velasco, who had previously served as Minister of Finance under Michelle Bachelet.

In 2014, he was appointed by President Michelle Bachelet as Chief Executive Officer of the state-owned ENAP during her second administration.
