= Ministry of Energy (Chile) =

Government ministry of Chile

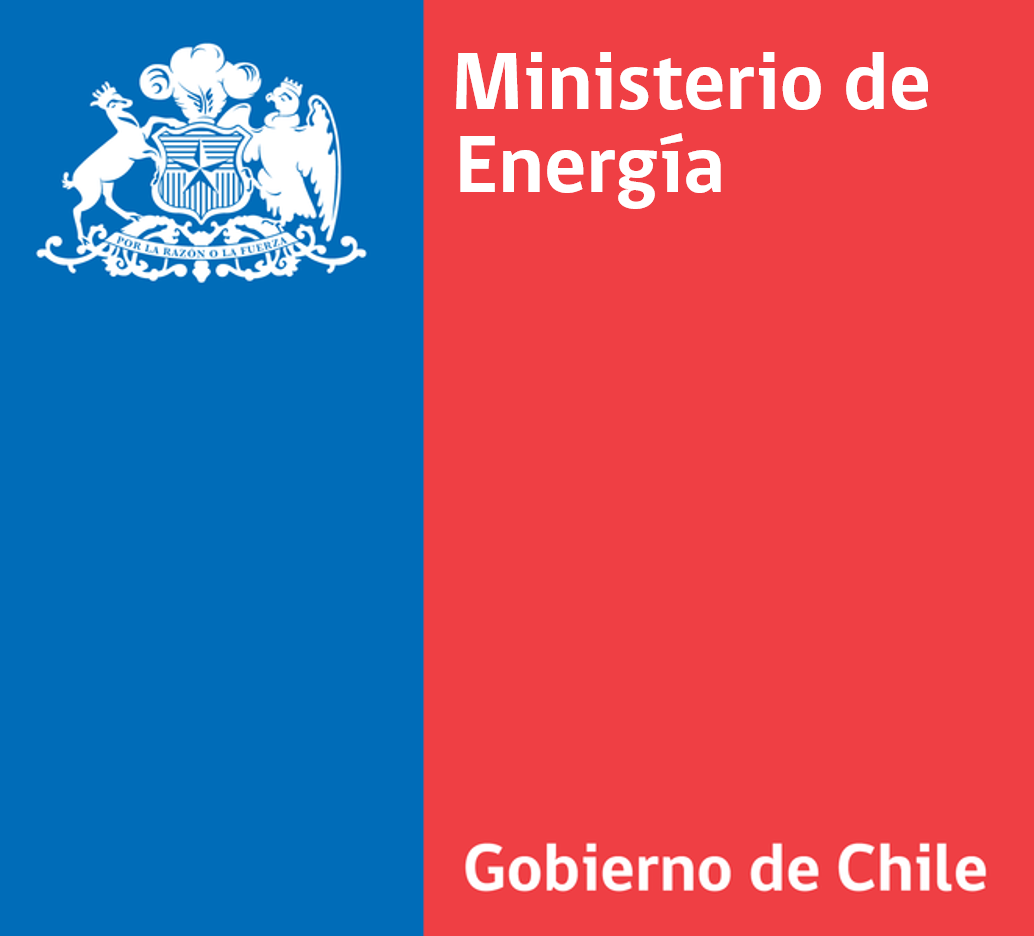

The Ministry of Energy (Spanish: Ministerio de Energía) is an entity created during the late part of the first presidency of Michelle Bachelet (2006−2010) after the releasing of the N°20.402 Decrete of Law on 1 February 2010.

Since that date, the current minister was separated from the Ministry of Mining. Its current minister is Ximena Rincón.

== List of representatives ==
| Minister | Party | Term start | Term end | President |
|---|---|---|---|---|
| Marcelo Tokman | PPD | 1 Febaruary 2010 | 11 March 2010 | Michelle Bachelet |
| Ricardo Raineri | RN | 11 March 2010 | 14 January 2011 | Sebastián Piñera |
| Laurence Golborne | UDI | 16 January 2011 | 18 July 2011 | Sebastián Piñera |
| Fernando Echeverría | RN | 18 July 2021 | 21 July 2018 | Sebastián Piñera |
| Rodrigo Álvarez Zenteno | UDI | 22 July 2011 | 27 March 2012 | Sebastián Piñera |
| Sergio del Campo | UDI | 27 March 2012 | 3 April 2012 | Sebastián Piñera |
| Jorge Bunster | Independent | 3 April 2012 | 11 March 2014 | Sebastián Piñera |
| Máximo Pacheco Matte | PS | 11 March 2014 | 19 October 2016 | Michelle Bachelet |
| Andrés Rebolledo | PS | 19 October 2016 | 11 March 2018 | Michelle Bachelet |
| Susana Jiménez Schuster | Independent | 11 March 2018 | 13 June 2019 | Sebastián Piñera |
| Juan Carlos Jobet | Independent | 13 June 2019 | 11 March 2022 | Sebastián Piñera |
| Claudio Huepe Minoletti | Independent | 11 March 2022 | 6 September 2022 | Gabriel Boric |
| Diego Pardow | Social Convergence | 6 September 2022 | 16 October 2025 | Gabriel Boric |
| Álvaro García Hurtado | PPD | 16 October 2025 | 11 March 2026 | Gabriel Boric |
| Ximena Rincón | Ind. | 11 March 2026 | Incumbent | José Antonio Kast |
