= James Reardon-Anderson =

American academic administrator

1st Dean of Georgetown University School of Foreign Service in Qatar
- In office 2005–2009
- President: John J. DeGioia
- Preceded by: Position established
- Succeeded by: Gerd Nonneman
- In office 2016–2017
- President: John J. DeGioia
- Preceded by: Gerd Nonneman
- Succeeded by: Ahmad S. Dallal

Interim Dean of Georgetown University School of Foreign Service
- In office 2013–2015
- President: John J. DeGioia
- Preceded by: Carol Lancaster
- Succeeded by: Joel Hellman

Personal details
- Born: April 1, 1944
- Died: November 24, 2022 (aged 78) Dallas, Texas, U.S.
- Spouse: Kathleen Reardon-Anderson
- Children: 3
- Education: Williams College (BA); Columbia University (MA, PhD)

James Reardon-Anderson (April 1, 1944 – November 27, 2022) was an American sinologist, historian, and academic administrator. He was the Sun Yat-sen Professor of Chinese Studies at Georgetown University, the founding dean of Georgetown University in Qatar, and the director of the university's Master of Science in Foreign Service program. He was also the interim dean of the Edmund A. Walsh School of Foreign Service from 2013 to 2015.

Reardon-Anderson was the author of five books on Chinese history, including The Study of Change: Chemistry in China, 1840–1949, which is considered "the first full-length study of the history of a modern science in China."

== Early life and education ==
Reardon-Anderson was born on April 1, 1944. He grew up in Farmington, Michigan. He obtained a B.A. in history from Williams College before earning an M.A. and Ph.D. from Columbia University in 1975.

== Career ==
Reardon-Anderson first visited and developed an interest in China in 1966, when he taught English in Hong Kong through the Williams in Hong Kong program.

He then taught at the University of Michigan and the Johns Hopkins School of Advanced International Studies before serving as the director of the Inter-University Program for Chinese Language Studies in Taipei in the 1980s. Reardon-Anderson also led the C.V. Starr East Asian Library of Columbia University as chief librarian from 1982 to 1985.

Reardon-Anderson joined the faculty of Georgetown University in 1985, where he taught history and the signature "Maps of the Modern World" course of the School of Foreign Service. He led the university's Asian Studies program from 1992 to 1995 and then the Master of Science in Foreign Service (MSFS) program from 2002 to 2005. He also served as the director of the Committee on Scholarly Communication with the People's Republic of China of the National Academies from 1990 to 1992, in which he oversaw a joint project between Western and Chinese scientists on the grassland ecosystem in China.

In 2005, Reardon-Anderson became the founding dean of Georgetown's branch campus in Qatar, serving from 2005 to 2009 and subsequently returning in 2016. During his tenure as dean, he led the joint efforts with the Qatar Foundation to protect migrant worker safety and welfare. He was also the interim Dean of the School of Foreign Service from 2013 to 2015. He transitioned to the faculty in 2017 and retired from his teaching at Georgetown in 2021.

Following his death, the School of Foreign Service in Qatar, where Reardon-Anderson served as the founding chair, named its library after him. Additionally, Georgetown University created the James Reardon-Anderson Medal, which is awarded to the graduating student with the strongest commitment to Reardon-Anderson's signature course, Map of the Modern World. The inaugural recipient was Kiernan Christ, a long-time teaching assistant for the Map course. The next two recipients were Elisabeth Koch and Chendi Liu for their commitment as Lead Teaching Assistants of "Map of the Modern World".

== Personal life ==
Reardon-Anderson was married to Kathleen Reardon-Anderson. They had a daughter, Jane, and two sons, Peter and William.
