= Clyde Wilcox =

Academic and political scientist

- Occupations: Political scientist, academic administrator
- Title: Acting Dean of Georgetown University in Qatar

Academic background
- Education: West Virginia University (BA); Ohio State University (MA, PhD)

Academic work
- Discipline: Political science
- Sub-discipline: American politics, religion and politics, campaign finance, public opinion
- Institutions: Georgetown University; Union College

Clyde Wilcox is a political scientist and professor of government at Georgetown University, where he has taught since 1987. On 1 June 2026, he became acting dean of Georgetown University in Qatar (GU-Q), having previously served as interim dean from 2021 to 2022.

Wilcox's research and teaching address religion and politics, gender politics, interest groups, public opinion and electoral behavior, campaign finance, and the relationship between science fiction and politics. He has published more than 30 books as an author, co-author, editor, or co-editor.

== Education and early career ==
Wilcox received a Bachelor of Arts degree from West Virginia University in 1975, and a master's degree and PhD in political science from Ohio State University in 1980 and 1984, respectively. Before joining Georgetown, he worked as a statistician at the Federal Election Commission and taught at Union College.

== Academic career ==
Wilcox joined Georgetown University's Department of Government in 1987. He began teaching at Georgetown University in Qatar in 2014 and subsequently held appointments at both Georgetown's Washington, D.C., campus and GU-Q. He has spent all or part of each academic year at the Doha campus since 2014.

He was the F. Ross Johnson Visiting Scholar at the University of Toronto in 2007, the William E. Phipps Religion and Politics Interdisciplinary Professor at Davis & Elkins College in 2007, and the A. Barton Hepburn Visiting Professor at the University of Tokyo in 2008. He also served as a visiting professor of political science at the Financial University under the Government of the Russian Federation in 2015 and 2016.

Wilcox has lectured internationally, participated in U.S. State Department programs for international visitors, and provided training to diplomats in the United States and other countries.

=== Administrative roles ===
Wilcox became interim dean of Georgetown University in Qatar on 16 October 2021, following the departure of Ahmad Dallal to become president of the American University in Cairo. He served in the position during the 2021–2022 academic year.

On 1 June 2026, Wilcox became acting dean of GU-Q during Dean Safwan Masri's research leave for the 2026–2027 academic year.

== Research ==
Wilcox's scholarship focuses primarily on American politics and comparative politics. His work has examined the role of religion in politics, the Christian right in the United States, abortion politics, campaign finance, gun control, gender politics in the United States and Europe, interest groups, public opinion, and science fiction and politics.

== Awards and recognition ==
In 2000, Kalamazoo College awarded Wilcox an honorary Doctor of Humane Letters. That year, he also received a Distinguished Alumnus Award from West Virginia University.

In 2025, Wilcox and political scientist Jocelyne Cesari were the joint recipients of the Susanne Hoeber Rudolph Outstanding Scholar Award from the Religion and Politics section of the American Political Science Association.

== Selected publications ==
- God's Warriors: The Christian Right in Twentieth-Century America (Johns Hopkins University Press, 1992)
- Between Two Absolutes: Public Opinion and the Politics of Abortion (with Elizabeth Adell Cook and Ted G. Jelen, Westview Press, 1992)
- Public Attitudes Toward Church and State (with Ted G. Jelen, M. E. Sharpe, 1995)
- Serious Money: Fundraising and Contributing in Presidential Nomination Campaigns (with Clifford W. Brown Jr. and Lynda W. Powell, Cambridge University Press, 1995)
- Onward Christian Soldiers? The Religious Right in American Politics (first published by Westview Press in 1996; fourth edition with Carin Robinson, 2010)
- Political Science Fiction (co-editor, University of South Carolina Press, 1997)
- The Changing Politics of Gun Control (co-editor, Rowman & Littlefield, 1998)
- Religion and Politics in Comparative Perspective: The One, the Few, and the Many (co-editor, Cambridge University Press, 2002)
- Interest Groups in American Campaigns: The New Face of Electioneering (with Mark J. Rozell and David Madland, second edition, CQ Press, 2006)
- Understanding Public Opinion (co-editor, third edition, CQ Press, 2009)
- Federalism: A Very Short Introduction (with Mark J. Rozell, Oxford University Press, 2019)
