= Nirupam Bajpai =

US-based Indian educationist and economist

- Born: Uttar Pradesh, India
- Education: University of Lucknow (M.Com., Ph.D. in Economics)
- Occupations: Educationist; Economist
- Awards: Padma Shri (2008)

Nirupam Bajpai, a US-based Indian educationist and economist, is the Senior Research Scholar at the Earth Institute of the Columbia University and the Senior Development Advisor and Director of its South Asia Program. He is the founding director of the Columbia Global Centers South Asia, an office he held between July 2010 and August 2014, and is the author of a number of publications, including India in the Era of Economic Reforms.

== Education and career ==
Bajpai was admitted to the M.Com. programme at the University of Lucknow in 1983 after completing his B.Com. in Mumbai. He graduated from the University of Lucknow and was awarded a PhD in Economics in 1988 before moving to the United States in 1992. where he worked at the Massachusetts Institute of Technology before joining Harvard Institute for International Development of Harvard University in 1995. He worked at Harvard University till 2002 during which time he also worked at the Kennedy School of Government of the University and led the Harvard India Program. In 2002, he joined Columbia University and is associated with the institution since then, working in various capacities.

== Awards and recognition ==
He has been a part of the team under Jeffrey Sachs who served three successive Indian governments from 2002, two of them led by Manmohan Singh and one by Atal Bihari Vajpayee, as advisors on rural health and education services. The Government of India awarded him the fourth highest civilian honour of the Padma Shri, in 2008, for his contributions to society.

== Books ==
- Improving Access and Efficiency in Public Health Services, SAGE Publishing India, 2008, ISBN 9351509338
- India in the Era of Economic Reforms, Oxford University Press, 1999, ISBN 0195648307

== See also ==
- Columbia Global Centers
- Earth Institute
- Jeffrey Sachs
