= Georgetown University in Qatar =

US university campus in Education City, Doha

- جامعة جورجتاون في قطر
- English-language logo of Georgetown University in Qatar, featuring the regular seal of Georgetown University
- Former names: Georgetown University, School of Foreign Service in Qatar (2005–2015)
- Motto: Utraque Unum ("Both into One")
- Type: Satellite campus of Georgetown University
- Established: August 31, 2005; 21 years ago
- Parent institution: Georgetown University
- Affiliations: Roman Catholic (Jesuit)
- Dean: Clyde Wilcox
- Faculty: 66
- Undergraduates: 433
- Location: Education City, Qatar; 25°18′56″N 51°26′5″E
- Campus: Suburban
- Language: English
- Newspaper: The Georgetown Gazette
- Colors: Blue and gray
- Nickname: Hoyas
- Mascot: Jack the Bulldog
- Website: www.qatar.georgetown.edu

Georgetown University in Qatar (GU-Q) is a campus of Georgetown University (Washington, D.C.) in Education City, Doha, Qatar. It is one of Georgetown University's eleven undergraduate and graduate schools, and is supported by a partnership between Qatar Foundation and Georgetown University.

In 2015, the university broadened its remit to include executive and professional education and custom training programs, in addition to the primary Bachelor of Science in Foreign Service degree. It rebranded to Georgetown University in Qatar (previously Georgetown University School of Foreign Service in Qatar or SFS-Q) to reflect the broadening of its remit.

== History and background ==
In 2002, Georgetown University studied the feasibility of opening a campus of the Edmund A. Walsh School of Foreign Service in Qatar in October 2002 and joined four other U.S. universities in opening a campus in Education City in 2005.

Since 2005, the campus became the home to the Center for International and Regional Studies (CIRS), GU-Q's premier research institute, which focuses on issues facing the Middle East and broader Asian region.

In April 2022, Georgetown University has appointed Safwan M. Masri, professor at Columbia University, Executive Vice President of Columbia Global Centers, as the new dean of Georgetown University in Qatar (GU-Q), effective 1 October 2022.

In September 2023, on the occasion of the 20th anniversary of the Iraq War, former Iraqi President Dr. Barham Salih attended and delivered a speech at an academic conference organized by GU-Q.

GU-Q has trained three recipients of the prestigious Rhodes Scholars, namely Khansa Maria (Class of 2021), who won the award in 2020, Asma Shakeel (Class of 2024), who won the award in 2023, and Fatima Yunusa (Class of 2024), who won the award in 2025. GU-Q has also educated two Schwarzman Scholars, namely Kingwell Ma (Class of 2026), and Zarrish Ahmed (Class of 2026), who won the award in 2026.

The Qatar Foundation provides funding for GU-Q’s operations.

On 16 April 2025, the Georgetown University and the Qatar Foundation renewed their partnership agreement to operate the campus in Doha for an additional 10 years. The agreement was signed while GU-Q was celebrating its 20th anniversary. Since its inaugural class of 18 students in 2009 the university has graduated almost 1,100 undergraduate and master’s degree students.

== Academics and admissions ==
=== Undergraduate programs ===
Georgetown offers a four-year Bachelor of Science in Foreign Service (BSFS), with five majors within the program, the curriculum and course materials of which are identical to those offered at Georgetown's main campus in Washington D.C:

- Culture and Politics (CULP)
- International Economics (IECO)
- International History (IHIST)
- International Politics (IPOL)
- Science, Technology and International Affairs (STIA)

Georgetown University in Qatar also offers three certificate options:

- The Certificate in American Studies
- The Certificate in Arab and Regional Studies
- The Certificate in Media and Politics, opened in partnership with Northwestern University in Qatar

Additionally, GU-Q offers six minors:

- Africana Studies Minor
- Arabic Language Program and Minor
- Indian Ocean Studies Minor
- Art, Heritage, and Cultural Diplomacy Minor
- Women’s and Gender Studies Minor
- French Language Program and Minor

GU-Q students also have the choice to pursue any of the minors available to students on the GU in DC campus, subject to course availability.

=== Executive and Professional programs ===
Georgetown University in Qatar offers three executive master's programs:

- Executive Master's in Diplomacy and International Affairs (EMDIA)
- International Executive Master's in Emergency and Disaster Management (IEDM)
- Executive Master's in Leadership-Qatar (EML-Q)

GU-Q also offers custom designed certificates, including programs on Public-Private Partnerships and Strategic Leadership Development.

Current students and graduates of GU-Q are offered special accelerated program considerations to enroll at Georgetown University's graduate professional schools and programs.

The IEDM is a collaboration with GU-Q's Office of Executive and Professional Education offered by the Georgetown School of Continuing Studies (SCS), the EMDIA is offered by the Georgetown University Walsh School of Foreign Service (SFS) and the EML-Q is offered by Georgetown Universitty’s McDonough School of Business.

In the fall 2027, the GU-Q is introducing a two year Master of Arts in International Politics and Security.

=== Admissions ===
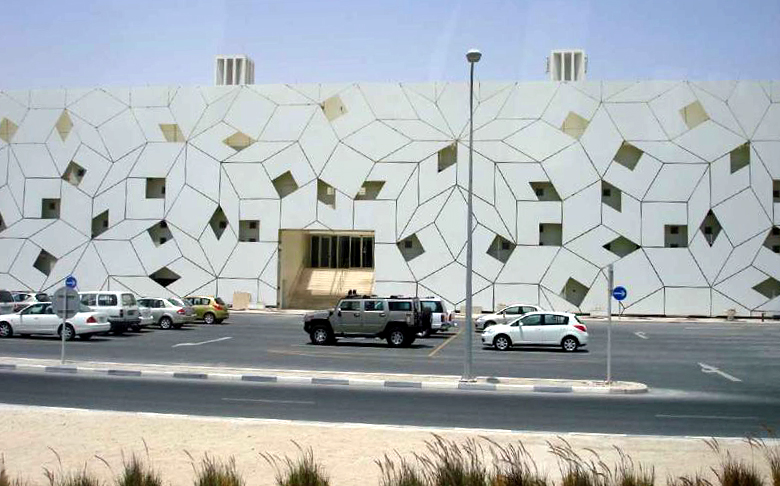
GU-Q's former building

Georgetown University in Qatar had an acceptance rate of less than 9% for the class of 2030, making it more selective than its main campus in DC, which had an acceptance rate of 13%. GU-Q's student body boasts representation from 66+ nationalities. The university is need-blind.

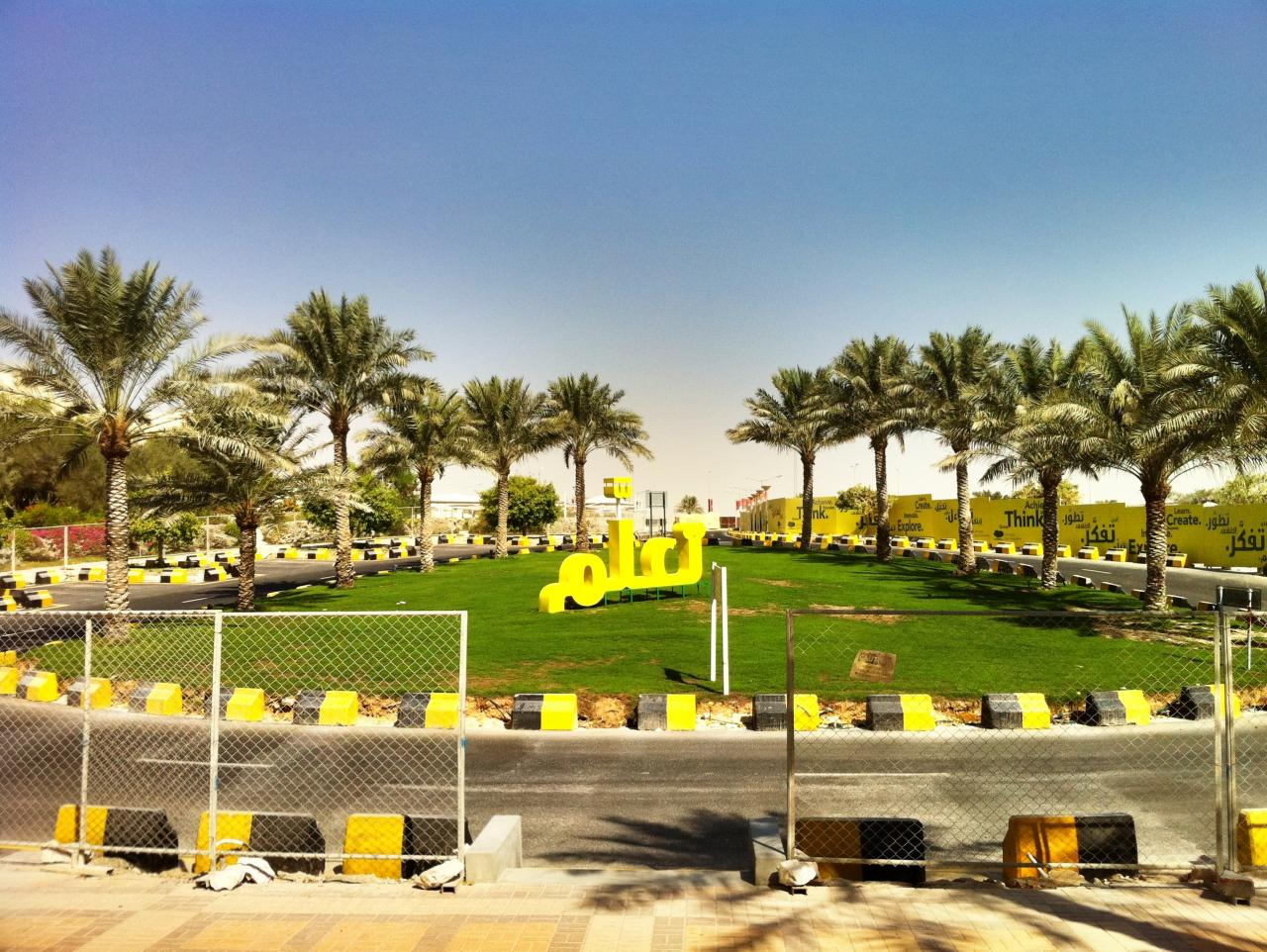
Doha Education City

== Research and faculty ==
The Center for International and Regional Studies (CIRS) sponsors studies of regional and international significance, including research initiatives in the areas of international relations, political economy, and domestic politics of the Persian Gulf.

Past and current research projects have included the study of Islamic bioethics, skills training for migrant workers, food security in Qatar, Arabic language pedagogy for heritage learners, and the history of women in Persian Gulf countries, among many other topics. Funding sources are available both within GU-Q and from external funding bodies.

GU-Q students formed the Middle Eastern Studies Association (MESSA) in 2012 as a forum for organizing an annual global conference to showcase undergraduate research in the social sciences and humanities. The conference is also fully organized by GU-Q students who consult extensively with a faculty board to help select papers for presentation and to peer review papers for possible publication in the annual Journal of the Georgetown University in Qatar Middle Eastern Studies Student Association. This journal is the first peer-reviewed scholarly journal run by students in Qatar.

GU-Q students have access to research grants funded by the Qatar National Research Fund Undergraduate Research Experience Program (QNRF-UREP) for research projects with topics that are relevant to Qatar's national development.

=== Notable faculty ===
In 2022, GU-Q faculty numbered 66, which includes both teaching and research staff.

- Gerd Nonneman, Chair of International Politics, Professor of International Relations and Gulf Studies
- Patrick Laude, French theologian and philosopher, Professor of Theology
- Ian Almond, Professor of World Literature
- Karl Widerquist, Professor of Philosophy
- Rogaia Mustafa Abusharaf, Professor of Anthropology
- Androulla Kaminara, Distinguished-Diplomat-in-Residence, First female European Union (EU) Ambassador to the Islamic Republic of Pakistan
- Maurice Jackson, American historian and visual artist, Visiting Associate Professor of History

=== GU-Q Publications ===
- Basic Income Studies
- HAWWA: Journal of Women in the Middle East and the Islamic World
- Journal of Arabian Studies
- Monsoon
- The Muslim World

== Campus ==
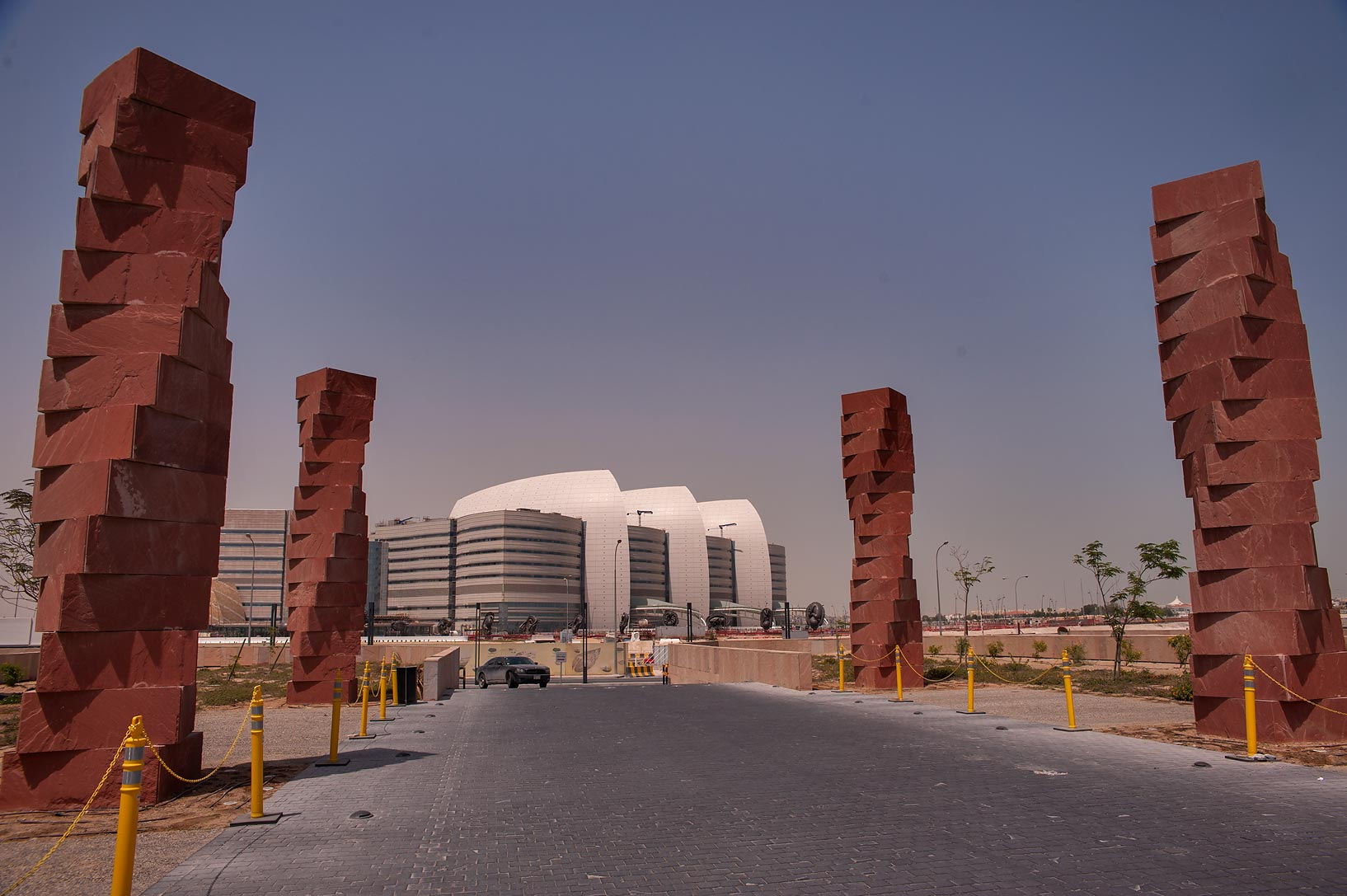
The entrance to Georgetown's campus in Education City

The Georgetown University in Qatar building in Education City was inaugurated in February 2011. The purpose-built 360,000-square-foot (33,000 m2) building features a three-story high atrium, an auditorium with a seating capacity for 300 people and 14 classrooms and lecture halls. It includes offices, classrooms, a library and other facilities for more than 200 undergraduate and graduate students. The facility was designed by Mexican architect Ricardo Legorreta.

GU-Q's office in Washington, D.C. is located at the Leavey Center at Georgetown University.

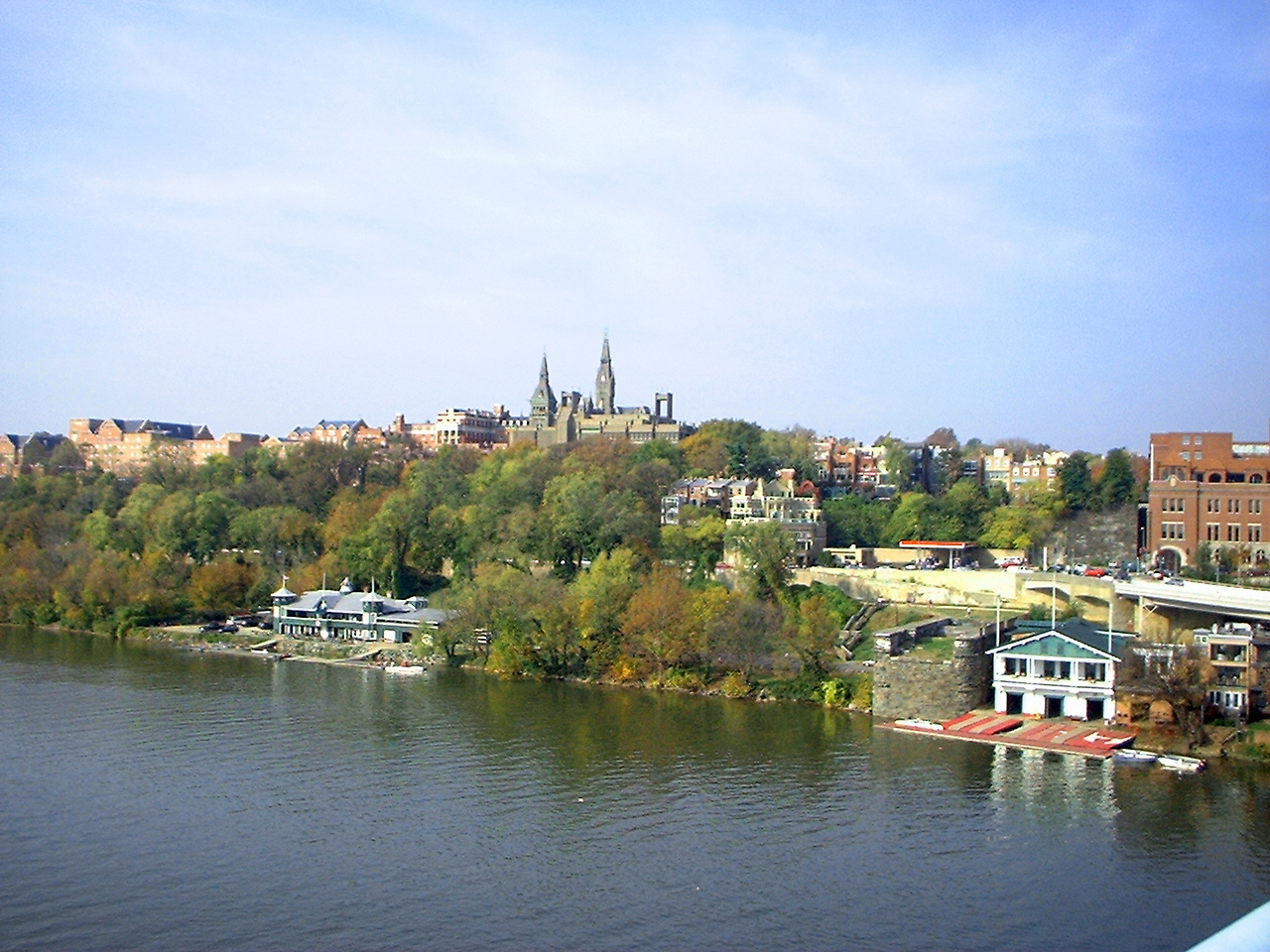
GU-Q's main campus in Washington, D.C, United States

=== James Reardon-Anderson Memorial Library ===
The James Reardon-Anderson Library was the largest library in Qatar before the Qatar National Library was built. The library is one of nine Georgetown University libraries. The library offers online access to more than 2 million scholarly resources and an intercampus loans service with Georgetown's library services in Washington DC. There is also an interlibrary loans services agreement with other universities on the Education City campus and with Qatar University. The Library houses over 90,000 books, and over 6,000 multimedia items. The Library space is open to the public. As of 2016, over 650,000 members of the GU-Q community and the general public have visited the library since 2005. In honor of its founding dean James Reardon-Anderson, the GU-Q Library was officially renamed the James Reardon-Anderson Memorial Library in 2023.

== Student life ==
=== Student organizations ===
About 25 student organizations exist on the school's campus. Student organizations include The Georgetown Gazette, Brainfood, the Women's Society and Development Club, Amal, Hoya Empowerment and Learning Program (HELP), Model United Nations, Photography Club, Senior Class Committee, Performing Arts Club, Fencing Club, The Free Society, Georgetown Business Society (GBS), Students for Justice in Palestine (GUQ-SJP), Southeast and East Asian Student Association (SEA), and the Georgetown Investment Association (GIA). Funding for student organizations comes from the Student Activities Commission (SAC) while the student body as a whole is represented by the Student Government Association (SGA).

== Student development ==
=== Study abroad experience ===
There are 213 study abroad programs in 57 countries available to GU-Q students, GU-Q students usually choose to study abroad for one or two semesters at Georgetown's main campus in DC, Villa Le Balze, or other partnering institutions with the Georgetown main campus.

Students who want to study abroad in their third year have to apply through the Office of Global Education for one of the limited available spots at the GU campus in Washington D.C. for one semester. They are entitled to financial aid, either through a GU-Q grant or Qatar Foundation Student Fund Scholarship, for tuition and fees for one term if approved. The GU-Q need-based grant can be used to study at the campus in Washington and the Qatar Foundation scholarship can be used for any GU study abroad program locations.

=== Zones of Conflict, Zones of Peace ===
Zones of Conflict, Zones of Peace (ZCZP) is one of GU-Q’s academic program, aiming to lead students to explore areas of the world that have been involved in political and military conflicts every semester. Previous destinations include Nepal, China, Spain, Finland, Japan, the United States, South Africa, Northern Ireland, Germany, Rwanda, Cambodia, Palestine, Israel, Jordan and other countries and regions.

== List of deans ==
No.	Name	Years	Notes	Ref.
1	James Reardon-Anderson	2005–2009		
-	Mehran Kamrava	2009–2011	Interim dean	
2	Gerd Nonneman	2011–2016		
3	James Reardon-Anderson	2016–2017		
4	Ahmad S. Dallal	2017–2021		
-	Clyde Wilcox	2021–2022	Interim dean	
5	Safwan M. Masri	2022-2026		
-	Clyde Wilcox	2026-Present	Interim dean	

== Notable alumni ==
- Sheikha Moza bint Nasser (honorary doctorate, 2005), mother of the Emir of the State of Qatar, co-founder and chair of the Qatar Foundation
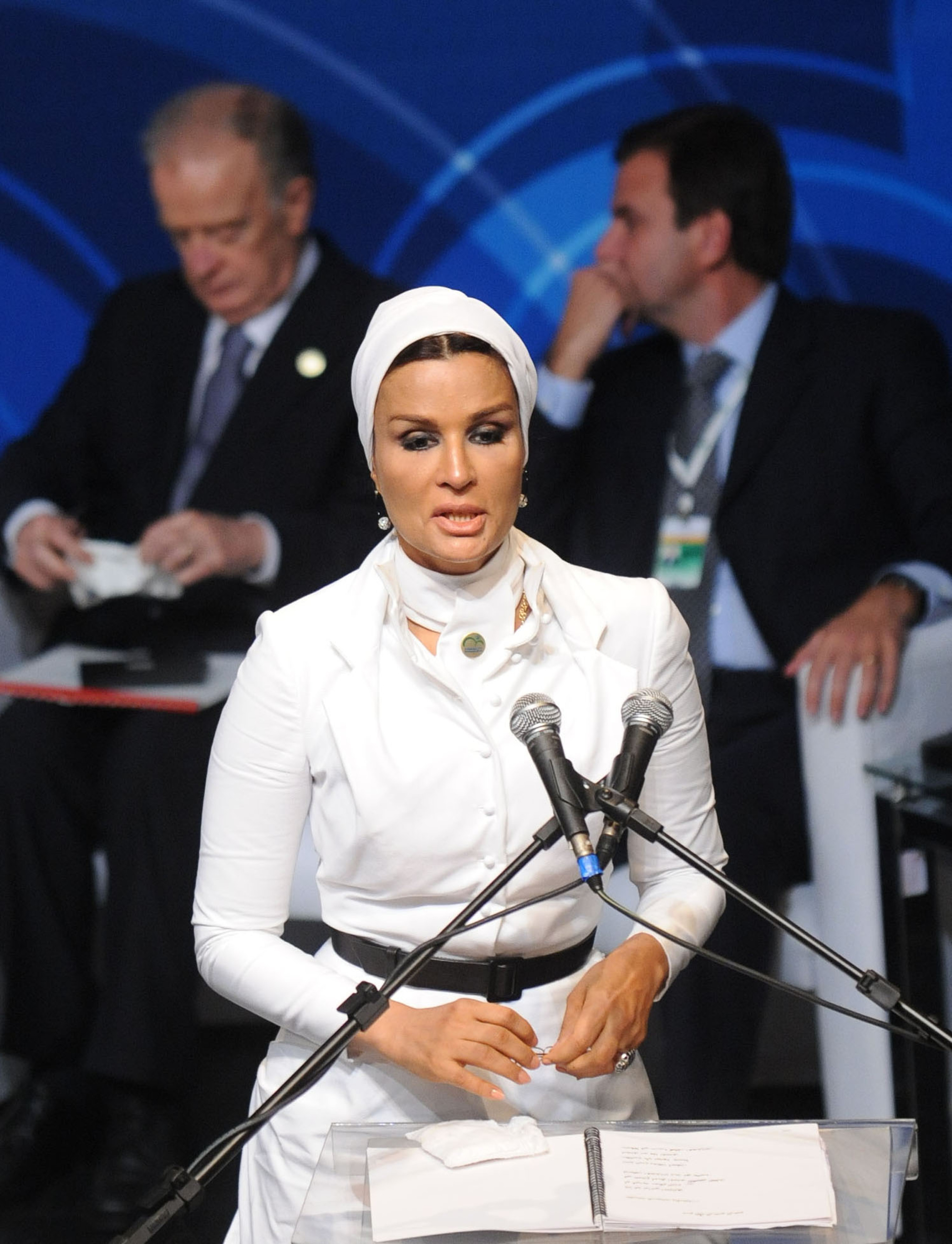
  Sheikha Moza, one of the founders of GU-Q
- Sheikh Abdullah bin Hamad bin Khalifa Al Thani (2010), Deputy Emir of the State of Qatar
- Sheikh Mohammed bin Hamad bin Khalifa Al Thani (2019), chairman of Qatar 2022 FIFA World Cup bid committee
- Nasser Yousef Al-Jaber (2010) – CEO, Teach for Qatar
- Salma Mousa (2012), UCLA assistant professor and political scientist.
- Haroon Yasin (2015), social entrepreneur and co-founder of Orenda
- Ahwaz Akhtar (2016), social entrepreneur and co-founder of Orenda

== See also ==
- List of universities and colleges in Qatar
