= Daniel Kaufmann =

Daniel Kaufmann may refer to:

- Daniel Kaufmann (economist), President of the Revenue Watch Institute
- Daniel Kaufmann (footballer) (born 1990), Liechtensteiner footballer

== See also ==
- Daniel Kaufman (fl. from 1994), an American director, film producer and screenwriter
