= Natural Resource Governance Institute =

US-based nonprofit organization

- Abbreviation: NRGI
- Formation: 2013
- Headquarters: 88 Pine Street, Wall Street Plaza, Suite 540, New York, NY, 10005, U.S.
- President and CEO: Suneeta Kaimal
- Staff: 70+
- Website: https://resourcegovernance.org/

The Natural Resource Governance Institute (NRGI) is an independent nonprofit organization dedicated to improving countries' governance over their natural resources (in particular oil, gas and minerals) to promote sustainable and inclusive development. The headquarters of NRGI are based in New York.

== History ==
The Natural Resource Governance Institute was established through the merger of the Revenue Watch Institute and the Natural Resource Charter in 2013. Originally based in New York, NRGI has opened offices in London, Accra, Dakar, Lima, Washington, D.C., and Dar Es Salaam. This partly reflects its focus on Chile, Colombia, Democratic Republic of Congo, Ghana, Guinea, Mexico, Mongolia, Nigeria, Senegal, Tanzania and Tunisia as focus countries.

== Organization and Activities ==
NRGI's vision is a world where natural resources enable fair, prosperous and sustainable societies, instead of undermining them. The organization's mission is to support informed, inclusive decision-making about natural resources and the energy transition.

NRGI is led by president and CEO Suneeta Kaimal. Its activities are supervised by a board of directors, with Gilbert F. Houngbo as chair. Finally, NRGI's leadership team and its board of directors are supported by an Advisory Council chaired by Audrey Gaughran. Other prominent figures affiliated with NRGI include Paul Collier, Ernest Aryeetey, Elena Panfilova, Alicia Bárcena Ibarra, Peter Eigen, Daniel Kaufmann, Antonio La Viña, Ilgar Mammadov, José Antonio Ocampo, Smita Singh, Anya Schiffrin, Andrés Velasco, Tony Venables and Ernesto Zedillo.

In line with its mission, NRGI supports civil society organizations, government institutions, private sector enterprises, and the media with technical advice, advocacy, applied research, policy analysis, and capacity development with regard to natural resource governance. Key tools developed in that context include for example the Resource Governance Index, a repository of resource contracts, and the Natural Resource Charter Benchmarking Framework. Research and resources from NRGI have been featured by international media such as The Guardian, BBC World Service, Financial Times, Foreign Policy and Washington Post as well as national media in the concerned countries, including The Guardian Nigeria, B&FT Online, The Citizen, La Silla Vacia, La República (Peru), and Jeune Afrique.

== The Natural Resource Charter ==
The Natural Resource Charter is a document aimed at providing advice and policy options with regard to the management of resource wealth in order to help resource-rich countries use their natural resources for sustainable development. NRGI promotes the implementation of the Natural Resource Charter and provides policy advice with regard to this implementation process. The Natural Resource Charter consists of the following 12 Precepts, which are organised into three parts based on the chain of decisions involved in natural resource management:

- Domestic foundations for resource governance

(1) Resource management should secure the greatest benefit for citizens through an inclusive and comprehensive national strategy, clear legal framework and competent institutions.
(2) Resource governance requires decision makers to be accountable to an informed public.

- Economic decisions required to manage resources for prosperity

(3) The government should encourage efficient exploration and production operations, and allocate rights transparently.
(4) Tax regimes and contractual terms should enable the government to realize the full value of its resources consistent with attracting necessary investment, and should be robust to changing circumstances.
(5) The government should pursue opportunities for local benefits, and account for, mitigate and offset the environmental and social costs of resource extraction projects.
(6) Nationally owned companies should be accountable, with well-defined mandates and an objective of commercial efficiency.
(7) The government should invest revenues to achieve optimal and equitable outcomes, for current and future generations.
(8) The government should smooth domestic spending of revenues to account for revenue volatility.
(9) The government should use revenue as an opportunity to increase the efficiency of public spending at the national and sub-national levels.
(10) The government should facilitate private sector investments to diversify the economy and to engage in the extractive industry.

- International foundations for resource governance

(11) Companies should commit to the highest environmental, social and human rights standards, and to sustainable development.
(12) Governments and international organizations should promote an upward harmonization of standards to support sustainable development.

== Resource Governance Index ==
The Resource Governance Index, developed by NRGI, measures the quality of countries' resource governance. The 2021 index was constructed by sending a 149-item questionnaire to experts in 18 countries, who research the issues raised in the questionnaire, compile documentation and complete the questionnaire. The quality of the survey data is then assessed by NRGI and enriched by further data on countries "enabling environments". Finally, NRGI calculates the index as a composite score out of the:

- Value realization score;
- Revenue management score;
- Enabling environment score;

with higher scores indicating a better resource governance process.
