= Center for International and Regional Studies =

Educational institution in Qatar

Coordinates: 25°18′56″N 51°26′4″E

The Center for International and Regional Studies (CIRS), located in Doha, Qatar, is a center for international and regional affairs. The center is a part of Georgetown University School of Foreign Service in Qatar (SFS-Qatar). The center works closely with SFS-Qatar Faculty to create research and publications, organize events and manage outreach activities.

Founded in 2005, the center works mainly in four areas: research, events and conferences, outreach and publications. Its inaugural director, Mehran Kamrava, still directs the center as of 2015. The center's main activities are concentrated on the political affairs of the Middle East region, with a lesser emphasis being placed on global affairs.

== History ==
The Center for International and Regional Studies was established in 2005 as an initiative of the Georgetown University School of Foreign Service in Qatar. Since its inception, the center has been involved in comprehensive studies and events on international and regional studies with an emphasis on the Persian Gulf and Middle East region.

== Mission ==
The Center for International and Regional Studies' (CIRS) mission revolves around five principal goals:

- Providing a platform for scholarship and research on both, international, and regional affairs.
- Promoting the comprehensive examination and interchange of ideas.
- Fostering introspective dialogue among students, scholars and specialists of international affairs.
- Facilitating the expansion of ideas and knowledge through publishing the results of its research, by financing and hosting conferences and seminars, and by hosting workshops.
- Engaging in outreach activities with a broad array of local, regional and international partners.

== Activities ==
The center engages in particular areas of academic endeavour, including:

- Hosting conferences and events
- Research and scholarship
- Publications
- Community outreach programs

== Research projects ==
The following are some of the research initiatives currently undertaken by the center:

=== Healthcare Policy and Politics in the Gulf States ===
CIRS launched a research project on the topic of “Healthcare Policy and Politics in the Gulf States” in order to promote an academic investigation of how the health profile of the region has changed over the course of last few decades. The purpose of the CIRS research initiative was to determine the economic, political, and social implications of healthcare management in the region. This project examined existing conditions of healthcare systems in the GCC, identified the existing challenges and pressures on the countries and societies, and assessed how, through their policymaking apparatus, states have attempted to overcome these challenges.

=== Social Currents in the Maghreb ===
This research initiative was launched to explore the "variations in social movement mobilization" in countries such as Algeria, Tunisia, Mauritania, Morocco, and Libya during the course of the Arab Spring. The initiative also sought to examine the social and cultural inclinations evident throughout society.

=== The Evolution of Gulf Global Cities ===
This multi-disciplinary research project aimed to understand the city's importance as a cultural and social space by examining the urban setting and configurations of cities in the Gulf region (the GCC, Iraq, Iran, and Yemen). By interacting with professionals from a variety of disciplines, the project sought to connect the macro-level understanding of urban projects with the micro-level comprehension of spaces of residence and social interactions.

=== Transitional Justice in the Middle East ===
Despite limited academic interest in the past, transitional justice in relation to the Middle East has become an increasingly relevant topic due to recent events in the region, such as the Arab Spring. CIRS launched this research initiative to examine various experiences of transitional justice as they transpire across the region in the post-Arab Spring era.

== Events and conferences ==
CIRS sponsors events and conferences throughout the year. Model United Nations and Monthly Dialogue Series are ongoing events that the center hosts.

=== Model United Nations ===
This CIRS-sponsored conference is an symposium for high school students to discuss global issues and increase awareness on international politics and policy-making. High school students from around the world come to Qatar's capital city to debate contemporary international politics. Following the 2007 annual conference, the Center hosted another one in January 2008.

=== Monthly Dialogue Series ===
This monthly event hosts scholars from SFS-Qatar and elsewhere in order to discuss their latest academic research. Some of the events in this series were “Living in the Past: Cairo Women of the darb” by Prof. Amira Sonbol, “The Ambassadors of Islamic spirituality and the Encounter of Religions” by Prof. Patrick Laude and the “A Public Good? Palestinian Businessmen and the British Colonial State 1939-1946” by Dr. Sherene Seikaly.

=== Other conferences and lectures ===
CIRS also hosts other relevant events on international and regional studies:

==== 2007 ====
- The United States and Iran: A Dangerous but Contained Conflict delivered by Mehran Kamrava in September 2007
- America and the Middle East after the Bush Presidency: The View from the Outside in October 2007
- US 2008 Elections delivered by Gary Wasserman in November 2007
- A Short History of British Diplomacy delivered by Ambassador Stephen Day in November 2007
- Environmental Degradation and Conservation: Challenges and Prospects in November 2007
- Lecture by Hany El Banna, president of Islamic Relief in December 2007

==== 2008 ====
- Lecture by Dr. John Esposito in February 2008
- Innovation in Islam in April 2008

== Publications ==
CIRS publishes a variety of research throughout the academic year, including Occasional Papers, Annual Reports, Newsletters, Books, Summary Reports, Briefs, as well as various Arabic language publications as well.

=== Occasional papers ===
CIRS has published Occasional Papers on a large variety of topics since its inception in 2007. Most of the papers are based on topics that are relevant to the Middle East and the Persian Gulf, and focus on a variety of disciplines. Some of the papers include Implications of the 2011-13 Syrian Uprising for the Middle Eastern Regional Security Complex, authored by Fred H. Lawson, and Iran's Northern Exposure: Foreign Policy Challenges in Eurasia, authored by Manochehr Dorraj.
