= Joel Hellman =

American political scientist

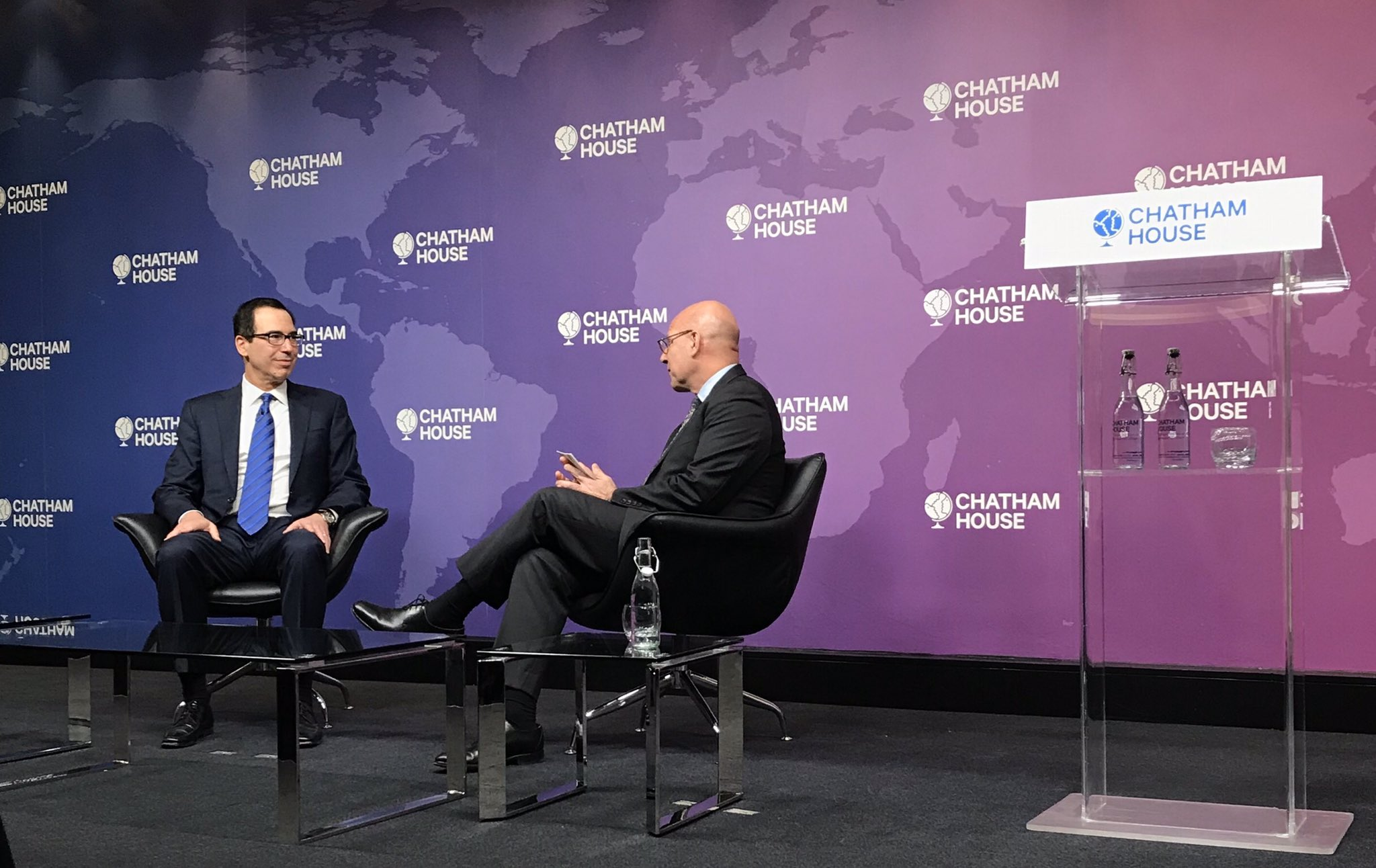

Dean of the Edmund A. Walsh School of Foreign Service
- Incumbent
- Assumed office July 2015
- Preceded by: Carol Lancaster

Personal details
- Born: March 1, 1963 (age 63) Brooklyn, New York, U.S.
- Education: Williams College (BA); St Antony's College, Oxford (MPhil); Columbia University (PhD)
- Occupation: Political scientist

Joel S. Hellman (born March 1, 1963) is an American political scientist. He is currently dean and distinguished professor in the practice of development at the Edmund A. Walsh School of Foreign Service at Georgetown University. He was appointed in July 2015. Formerly, he was chief institutional economist at the World Bank.

== Education ==
Hellman holds a B.A. in area studies from Williams College, a M.Phil. in Russian and East European studies from the University of Oxford, St. Antony's College, and a Ph.D. in political science from Columbia University.

== Career ==
Hellman began his academic career as an assistant professor in the Department of Political Science at Columbia University and a Fellow at the Harriman Institute for Russian and East European Studies. From 1993 to 1997, he was an assistant professor in the Department of Government at Harvard University and a Fellow at the Davis Center for Russian and East European Studies.

In 1997, Hellman joined the Office of the Chief Economist at the European Bank of Reconstruction and Development in London, where he served as senior political councillor. At the EBRD, he was editor of the annual Transition Report, which surveyed progress in the transition to market economics and democratic politics in the countries of the former Soviet Union.

He led the development of the annual Business Environment and Enterprise Performance Survey (BEEPS), a multi-country survey of firm behavior in the post-Soviet states that became an important data source for comparing how firms developed in the context of different transition economies.

In 2000, Hellman moved to the World Bank, serving in a variety of roles across multiple countries and regions. He led World Bank operations on governance and anti-corruption in the Europe and Central Asia Region. He served as Governance Adviser in Indonesia and led the World Bank's response to the East Asian tsunami in Aceh, Indonesia.

He managed the World Bank's governance operations in the South Asia region, covering such countries as Afghanistan, Bangladesh, India, Nepal, Pakistan and Sri Lanka. In 2013, he was appointed to lead the World Bank's global work in Fragile and Conflict Affected Countries based in Nairobi, Kenya. In 2015, he was appointed as the World Bank's first Chief Institutional Economist, leading the World Bank's research and analytical work on governance and institutions.

In July 2015, he was selected as Dean in the Edmund A. Walsh School of Foreign Service at Georgetown University as well as Distinguished Professor in the Practice of Development. He introduced the first joint undergraduate degree at Georgetown University in Business and Global Affairs together with the McDonough School of Business. He launched the Center for Security and Emerging Technology to provide policy-oriented research analysis on how new technologies are reshaping the global security landscape.

== Research ==
Hellman's research focused on the politics of the transition to a market economy in the former Soviet States. He is best known for developing the concept of “partial reform equilibrium” that explained how the early actors who gained enormous wealth by exploiting the market distortions of the early post-Soviet transition from a state-owned economy used their economic and political clout to preserve those distortions and thus stall further progress of market reforms. This laid the foundation for an understanding of the rise of oligarchs whose wealth and power were derived from partial reforms in the path to a market economy. The concept of a partial reform equilibrium has subsequently been applied to other countries in the process of market transition, such as China.

Together with Daniel Kaufmann at the World Bank, Hellman developed the concept of “state capture”, which is defined as form of political corruption in which actors seek to influence the shape of the state's laws, rules and regulations in their interests through the provision of private benefits to public officials. Hellman and Kaufmann developed comparative measures of state capture across multiple countries. The concept of state capture has been applied to many countries in the world, most dramatically in South Africa, where a specially created State Capture Commission was created to investigate forms of corrupt political influence.

== Personal life ==
Hellman was born in Brooklyn, New York. He is married and has one child. He serves on the Board of Trustees of Williams College.

== Publications ==
- "Seize the State, Seize the Day: An Empirical Analysis of State Capture and Corruption in Transition Economies," (with Geraint Jones and Daniel Kaufmann), Journal of Comparative Economics, vol. 31, no. 4 (December 2003).
- "Confronting the Challenge of State Capture in Transition Economies," (with Daniel Kaufmann) Finance and Development, vol. 38, no. 3 (September 2001).
- "Review Essay: Institutional Design in Post-communist Societies," East European Constitutional Review, vol. 7, no. 3 (Summer 1998).
- "Winners Take All: The Politics of Partial Reform in Post-Communist Transitions," World Politics, vol. 50, no. 2 (January 1998). Awarded the Sage Prize for Best Paper in Comparative Politics (1998 American Political Science Association Annual Meeting).
- "Constitutions and Economic Reform in the Post-communist Transitions," East European Constitutional Review, vol. 5, no. 1 (Winter 1996).
- "Russia Adjusts to Stability," Transition, vol. 2, no. 10 (May 1996).
- "Gorbachev's New World View," Social Policy, vol. 18, no.1 (Summer 1987).
- "List of Works". Google Scholar.
- "Most widely held works by Joel S Hellman". WorldCat.
