= Walsh School of Foreign Service =

School of international affairs at Georgetown University

- Type: Private nonprofit school of international relations
- Established: 1919; 107 years ago
- Founder: Edmund A. Walsh
- Parent institution: Georgetown University
- Religious affiliation: Roman Catholic (Jesuit)
- Academic affiliations: APSIA
- Dean: Joel Hellman
- Faculty: 134 (main campus)
- Students: 2,273
- Undergraduates: 1,423
- Postgraduates: 850
- Location: Washington, D.C., U.S. 38°54′32″N 77°4′25″W
- Campus: Urban
- Website: sfs.georgetown.edu

The Edmund A. Walsh School of Foreign Service (SFS) is the school of international relations at Georgetown University, a congressionally-chartered Jesuit research university in Washington, D.C. Founded in 1919, SFS is the oldest continuously operating school for international affairs in the United States, predating the U.S. Foreign Service by six years. It grants degrees at both undergraduate and graduate levels.

SFS was established by Edmund A. Walsh with the goal of preparing Americans for various international professions in the wake of expanding U.S. involvement in world affairs after World War I. Today, the school hosts a student body of approximately 2,250 from over 100 nations each year. It offers an undergraduate program based in the liberal arts, which leads to the Bachelor of Science in Foreign Service (BSFS) degree, as well as eight interdisciplinary graduate programs.

Based in Washington, D.C., the school also maintains campuses in Doha, Qatar, and Jakarta, Indonesia. SFS is a founding member of the Association of Professional Schools of International Affairs (APSIA), a consortium of the world's leading public policy, public administration, and international affairs schools.

SFS alumni have included a former U.S. president, the current kings of Spain and Jordan, at least 87 ambassadors, as well as dozens of foreign ministers, cabinet secretaries, and members of the U.S. Congress. Beyond public service, alumni include at least two living billionaires, Academy Award winners, Pulitzer Prize-winning journalists, and dozens of Fortune 500 executives. Since 2015, Joel Hellman, the World Bank's first chief institutional economist, has served as dean of the SFS.

== History ==
=== 20th century ===
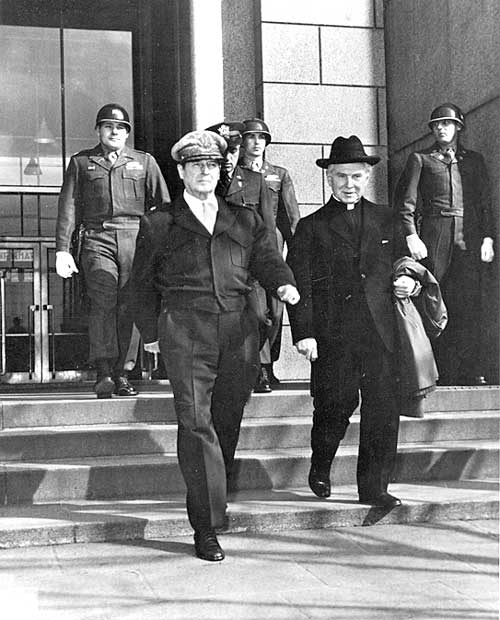
Edmund A. Walsh, the founder and first dean of the school, with General Douglas MacArthur in 1946

With the help of Georgetown University president John B. Creeden, Edmund A. Walsh spearheaded the founding of the School of Foreign Service and its establishment was announced on November 25, 1919. The school's use of the name “Foreign Service” preceded the formal establishment of the U.S. Foreign Service by six years. The school was envisioned by Walsh to prepare students for all major forms of foreign representation from commercial, financial, consular to diplomatic.

In 1921, it graduated its first class of Bachelor of Science in Foreign Service (BSFS) undergraduate students. The following year, the school began to offer the first international relations graduate program in the United States, the Master of Science in Foreign Service (MSFS).

In August 1932, the SFS was moved to the Healy Hall, a National Historic Landmark. In 1958, two years after the death of Walsh, the school was renamed after him and moved to the Walsh Building in a ceremony dedicated by President Dwight D. Eisenhower in honor of Walsh.

In 1936, the SFS Division of Business and Public Administration launched the Bachelor of Science in Business Administration (BSBA) degree. In 1957, under the leadership of Joseph Sebes, the division was spun off from the SFS, becoming the School of Business Administration — later renamed McDonough School of Business in honor of Robert Emmett McDonough (SFS'49).

In 1962, the Center for Strategic and International Studies (CSIS) was founded at Georgetown University as a think tank to conduct policy studies and strategic analyses of political, economic and security issues throughout the world. When Henry Kissinger retired from his position as U.S. Secretary of State in 1977, he declined offers of professorship from Harvard, Yale, Penn, Columbia, and Oxford, and decided to teach at Georgetown SFS instead, making CSIS the base for his Washington operations. In 1986, the university's board of directors voted to sever all ties with CSIS.

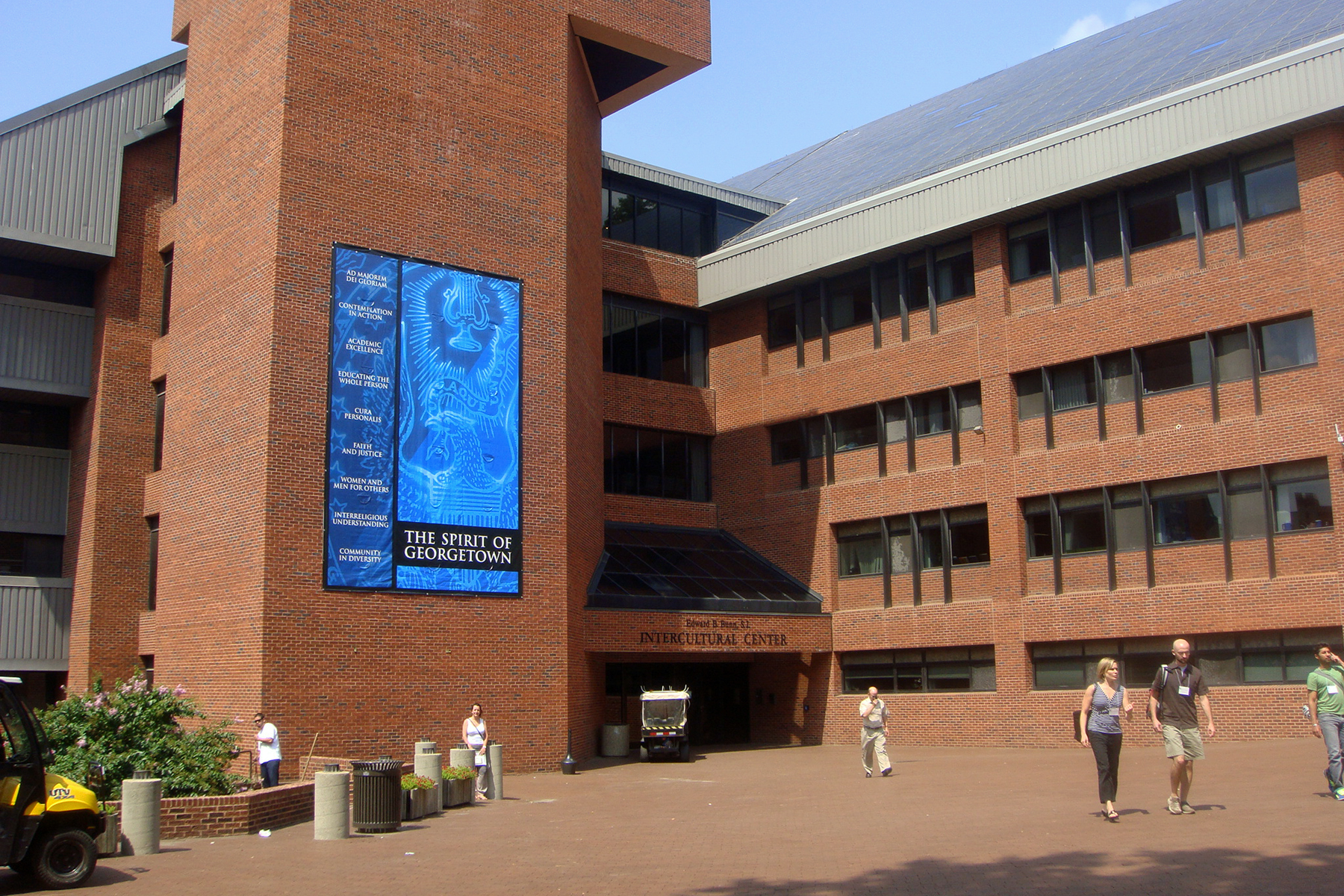
The SFS is housed in the Intercultural Center on Georgetown's main campus.

Since 1982, the school has been housed in the Edward B. Bunn. Intercultural Center (ICC) on Georgetown's main campus. In 1989, the Salaam Intercultural Resource Center, which is located on the top floor of the ICC, was opened in a ceremony presided by President Jimmy Carter. The center is a gift by Hany M. Sala'am and has housed the school's MSFS program since 1989.

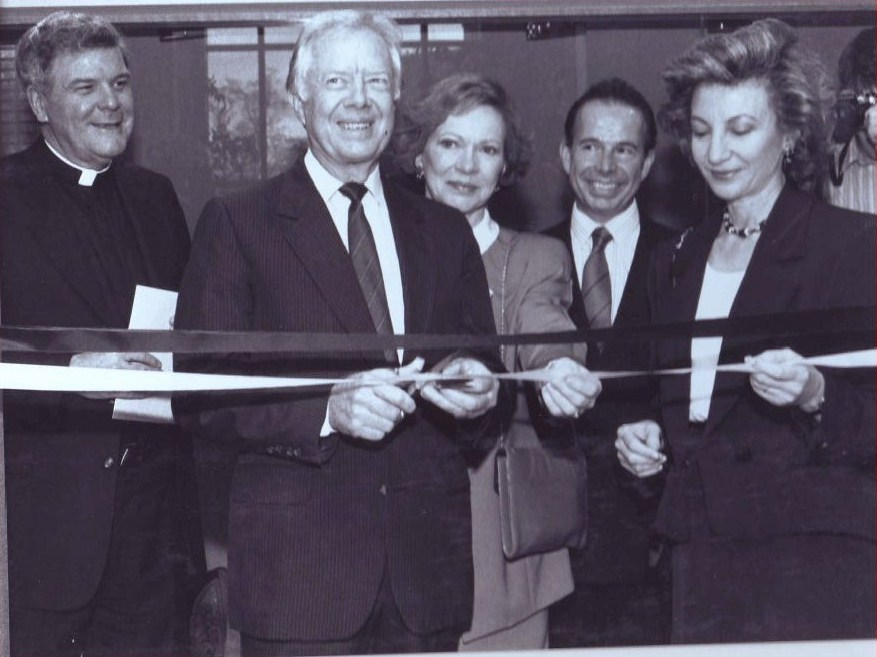
U.S. president Jimmy Carter opened the Salaam Intercultural Resource Center, which has housed Georgetown's Master of Science in Foreign Service (MSFS) program since 1989.

In 1975, the Center for Contemporary Arab Studies (CCAS) was launched as the first academic institution in the United States to focusing exclusively on the Arab world. CCAS is a National Resource Center on the Middle East and North Africa (NRC-MENA) and funded by Title VI grants from the U.S. Department of Education, in addition to donation from Gulf Cooperation Council (GCC) governments. In 1999, King Abdullah II of Jordan (MSFS'87) dedicated a new facility for the center.

In 1978, the Institute for the Study of Diplomacy (ISD) was founded to bring together diplomats, practitioners and scholars to study diplomatic statecraft theory and practice. Past ISD fellows include Georgian deputy prime minister Giorgi Baramidze and Chinese foreign minister Wang Yi. From 1975 until 2016, the ISD also awarded the Edward Weintal Prize for Diplomatic Reporting to journalists in recognition of their distinguished reporting on foreign policy and diplomacy.

In 1992, following the collapse of the Soviet Union and the Eastern Bloc, the SFS launched the Pew Economic Freedom Fellows Program to train future leaders of transitional states from Eastern Europe and post-Soviet countries. Notable fellows include Latvian finance minister Uldis Osis, Kazhastan deputy prime minister Kairat Kelimbetov, and Lithuania president Dalia Grybauskaite, who was later awarded an honorary Doctor of Humane Letters degree by Georgetown University in 2013.

In 1995, the Security Studies Program (SSP), which was founded in 1977 as the National Security Studies Program (NSSP) and hosted at the U.S. Department of Defense headquarters in the Pentagon, was moved to Georgetown's main campus and incorporated into the SFS.

=== 21st century ===
In 2002, the school studied the feasibility of opening a campus in Qatar Foundation's Education City in Doha, Qatar. In 2005, the School of Foreign Service in Qatar (SFS-Q) was officially opened and welcomed its first class of undergraduate students. In 2015, the school was renamed to Georgetown University in Qatar (GU-Q) as it broadened its remit to include executive masters and professional programs.

In 2005, Saudi prince Al-Waleed bin Talal gave $20 million to the school's Center for Muslim-Christian Understanding to promote interfaith understanding and the study of the Muslim world. The gift was the second-largest ever given to Georgetown at that point, and the center was renamed in his honor.

In 2011, following the United Nations Security Council Resolution 1325, U.S. secretary of state Hillary Clinton launched the Georgetown Institute for Women, Peace and Security (GIWPS) and served as its founding chair.

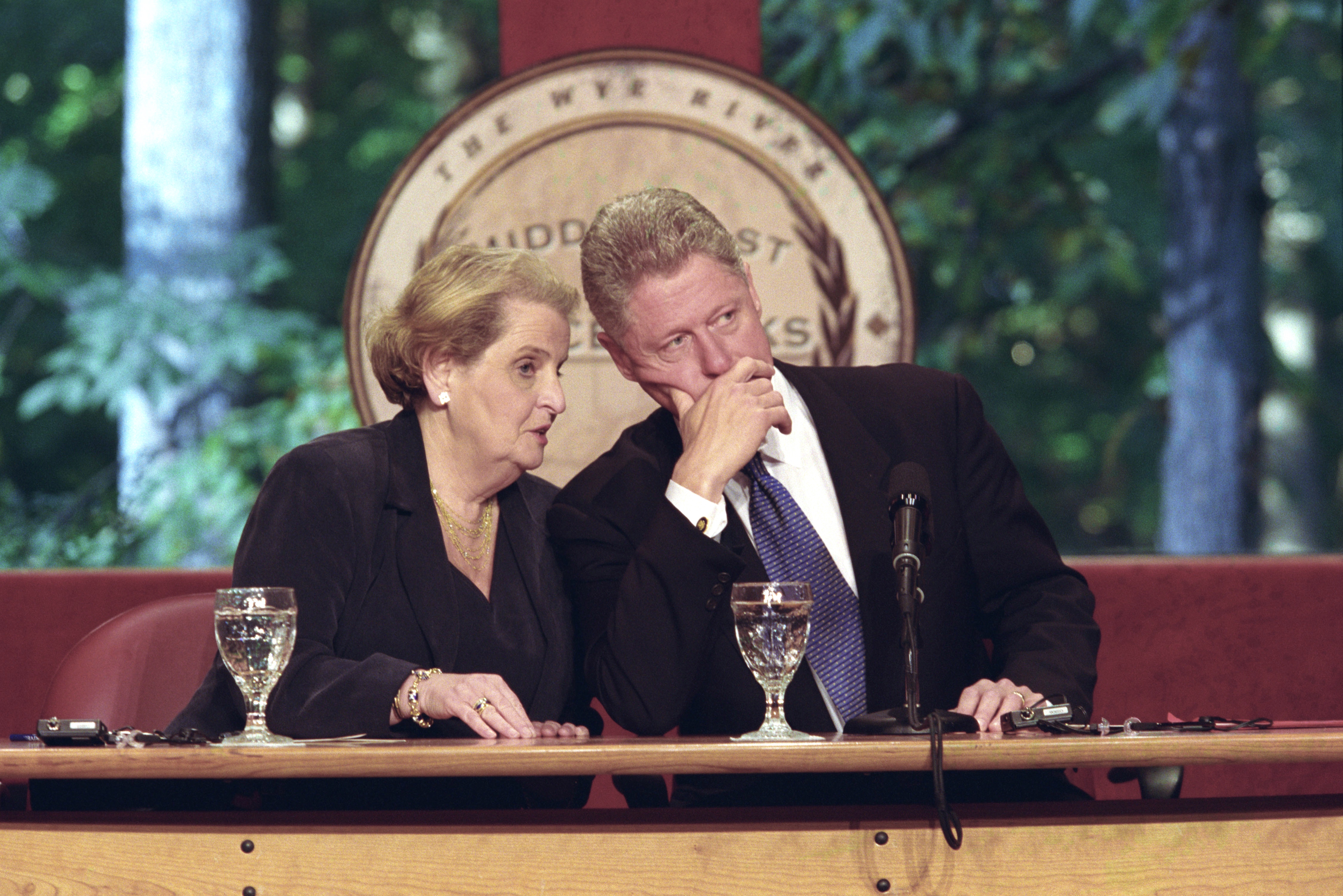
SFS professor Madeleine Albright, who served as U.S. Secretary of State under President Bill Clinton (SFS'68), was a frequent winner of the school’s Outstanding Professor Award.

In June 2023, the administrators announced the plan to rename the school in honor of the late Madeleine Albright, who served as a professor at SFS both before and after her tenure as U.S. secretary of state. It attracted criticism due to Albright's controversial legacy and the lack of consultation with the school's community members. In October 2023, Georgetown announced that it was no longer considering renaming the school after Albright.

In November 2023, Indonesian president Joko Widodo announced Georgetown's partnership with the Indonesian government to open a satellite campus in the country. In January 2025, Georgetown SFS Asia-Pacific (GSAP) campus was launched in Jakarta, Indonesia, to offer graduate masters and visiting student programs.

== Academics ==
=== Undergraduate program ===
The Bachelor of Science in Foreign Service (BSFS) degree is offered by the School of Foreign Service. The degree is rooted in the liberal arts. Following completion of the core requirements, students declare one of the following interdisciplinary majors:

- Culture and Politics (CULP)
- Global Business (GBUS)
- International Economics (IECO)
- International History (IHIS)
- International Political Economy (IPEC)
- International Politics (IPOL)
- Regional and Comparative Studies (RCST)
- Science, Technology, & International Affairs (STIA)

There is also a joint degree — Bachelor of Science in Business and Global Affairs — offered in partnership with the McDonough School of Business (MSB).

=== Graduate program ===
Graduate students can pursue eight interdisciplinary graduate degrees in the school:

- Master of Science in Foreign Service (MSFS) with concentrations in:
  - Global Business, Finance & Society (GBFS)
  - Global Politics & Security (GPS)
  - International Development (IDEV)
  - Science, Technology, and International Affairs (STIA)
- Master of Arts in Security Studies (SSP)
- Master of Global Human Development (GHD)
- Master of Arts in Arab Studies (MAAS)
- Master of Arts in Asian Studies (MASIA)
- Master of Arts in German and European Studies (MAGES)
- Master of Arts in Eurasian, Russian and East European Studies (MAERES)
- Master of Arts in Latin American Studies (CLAS)

There are two joint executive degrees offered in partnership with Georgetown's McDonough School of Business: the Global Executive MBA offered in collaboration with the ESADE Business School in Spain and the INCAE Business School in Costa Rica, and the MA in International Business and Policy (MA-IBP). The school's Institute for the Study of Diplomacy also offers the Executive Master in Diplomacy and International Affairs (EMDIA) at the SFS campuses in Doha, Qatar, and Jakarta, Indonesia. SFS is a member of the Association of Professional Schools of International Affairs (APSIA), a global consortium of schools that trains leaders in international affairs.

Additionally, exceptional undergraduate SFS students can apply for the accelerated bachelor’s/master’s dual-degree program, which allows enrollment in one of the graduate programs (e.g. BSFS/MSFS, BSFS/MASIA, etc.) during the final undergraduate year and completion of both degrees in approximately five years.

=== Certificates ===
Georgetown offers a number of undergraduate and graduate certificate programs: African studies, Arab studies, Asian studies, Australian & New Zealand studies, German and European studies, international business diplomacy (honors program), international development, Muslim-Christian understanding, Jewish civilization, justice & peace studies, Latin American studies, medieval studies, Russian & East European studies, social & political thought, and women's and gender studies.

== Reputation and rankings ==
Georgetown SFS rankings

Global
Foreign Policy – Master's	1
Foreign Policy – Bachelor's	1
QS – Politics	10
ARWU – Political Sciences	21

United States
Niche – International Relations	2
U.S. News & World Report – Global Policy and Administration	4

Georgetown's programs in international relations have consistently ranked among the best in the world in surveys of the field's academics that have been published biennially since 2005 by Foreign Policy. In 2014 and in 2018 Foreign Policy ranked Georgetown's master's programs first in the world and its bachelor's programs fourth. In 2024, Georgetown's master's programs were ranked first by all three groups of respondents: international relations faculty, policymakers, and think tank staffers. Its bachelor's programs were ranked first by policymakers and think tank staffers and third by international relations faculty.

In a Pipeline to the Beltway survey of makers of American foreign-policy from 2011, Georgetown ranked second overall in the quality of preparation for a career in the U.S. government, regardless of degree earned. In 2023, U.S. News & World Report ranked Georgetown fifth for graduate studies in global policy and administration. In 2024, Niche ranked Georgetown first in the United States for international relations.

== Student life ==
There are a vast array of clubs and student organizations at Georgetown that students from the SFS join. The elected representative organization of the SFS is the SFS Academic Council (SFSAC), which advocates for the SFS student body and works with the Dean's Office to address student concerns, spearhead new initiatives, and coordinate events. The School of Foreign Service also sponsors a flagship peer-reviewed academic publication, the Georgetown Journal of International Affairs (GJIA), which is published by Johns Hopkins University Press and run by undergraduate and graduate students.

== Campuses ==
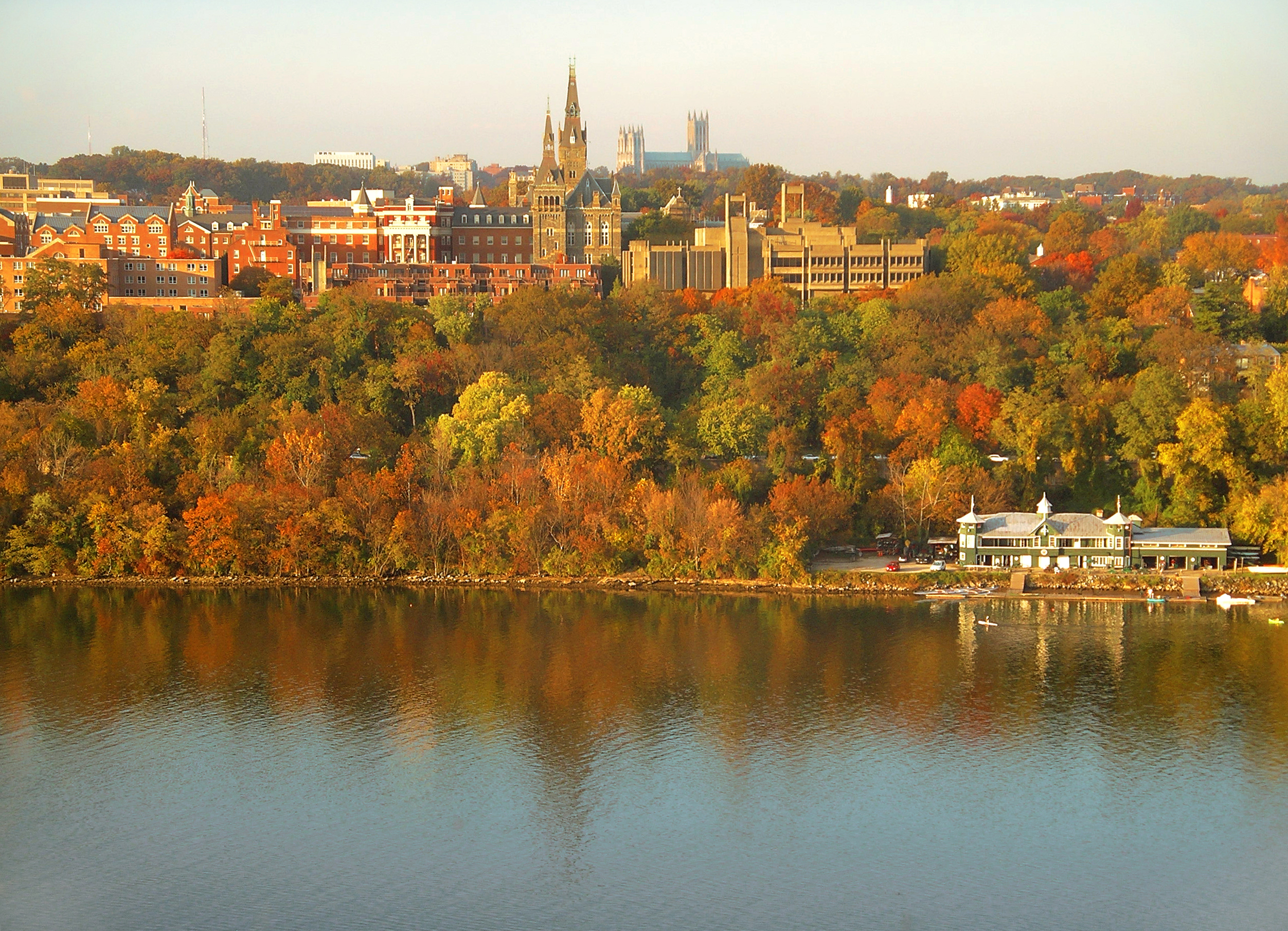
Georgetown's main campus in Washington, D.C., is built on a rise above the Potomac River.

The School of Foreign Service main campus, which is part of the main campus of Georgetown University, is located in the Georgetown neighborhood in Northwest Washington, D.C. In 2005, it opened another campus, the School of Foreign Service in Qatar (also known as SFS-Q or GU-Q), in Qatar Foundation's Education City in Doha, Qatar. In 2025, the school opened a facility in Jakarta, Indonesia, known as Georgetown SFS Asia-Pacific (GSAP), in partnership with the Indonesian government. Many SFS undergraduates spend a minimum of one semester or a summer abroad, choosing from direct matriculation programs around the globe as well as programs of other universities and those run by Georgetown, including SFS-Q, GSAP and Villa Le Balze.

== List of deans ==
Deans
No.	Name	Years	Notes	Ref.
1	Edmund A. Walsh SJ	1919–1921		
2	Roy S. MacElwee	1921–1923		
3	W. F. Notz	1923–1935		
4	Thomas H. Healy	1935–1943		
5	Edmund A. Walsh SJ	1945–1950	Acting dean	
6	Frank L. Fadner SJ	1950–1958	Acting dean	
7	John F. Parr	1958–1962		
8	William E. Moran, Jr.	1962–1966		
9	Joseph S. Sebes SJ	1966–1968		
10	Jesse Mann	1968–1970		
11	Peter F. Krogh	1970–1995		
12	Robert Gallucci	1995–2009		
13	Carol Lancaster	2010–2013		
-	James Reardon-Anderson	2013–2015	Interim dean	
14	Joel Hellman	2015–present		

== Notable people ==
=== Notable faculty ===
- Jan Karski, Polish Catholic nobleman, diplomat and military officer
- Henry Kissinger, Professor of Diplomacy, 1977
- Madeleine Jana Korbel Albright, the Mortara Distinguished Professor of Diplomacy
- George John Tenet, Distinguished Professor in the Practice of Diplomacy
- Victor Cha, Distinguished University Professor, D.S. Song-KF Endowed Chair in Government and International Affairs
- David M. Edelstein, Vice Provost for Education
- Lev Dobriansky, Professor of Economics
- Anwar Ibrahim, Distinguished Visiting Professor
- Ishaan Tharoor, adjunct professor
- Gina Bennett, adjunct professor

=== Notable alumni ===
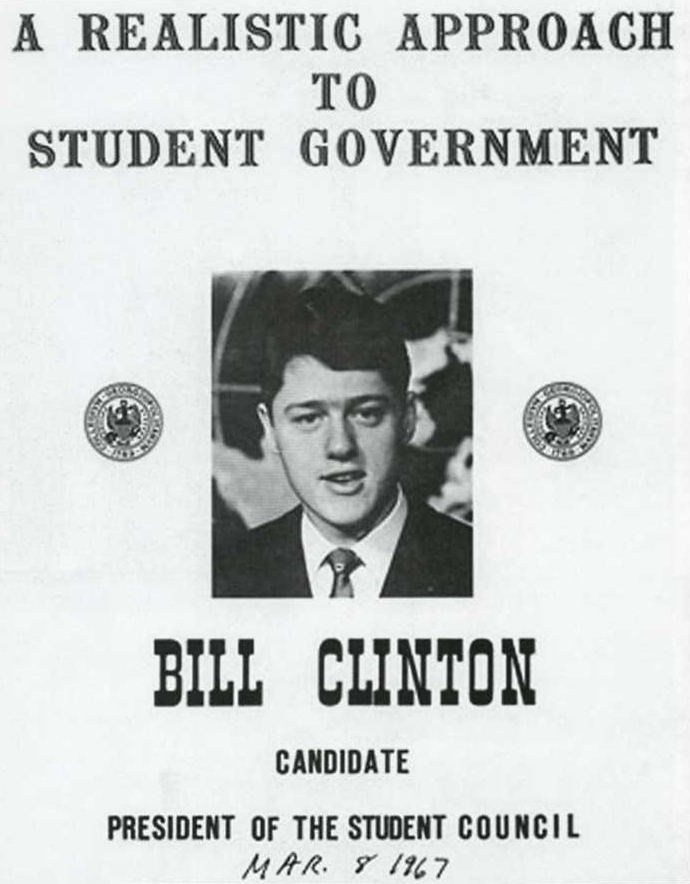
Bill Clinton, class of 1968, ran for student council president his senior year.

- Abdullah II of Jordan (1987), King of Jordan
- Abdullah bin Hamad Al Thani (2010) Deputy Emir of Qatar
- Christopher R. Agnew, social psychologist
- Toney Anaya (1964) Governor of New Mexico
- Sheikha Moza bint Nasser, mother of the Emir (King of Qatar), co-founder and chair of the Qatar Foundation
- Adel al-Jubeir (1984) Minister of State for Foreign Affairs of Saudi Arabia
- John R. Allen, former commander of International Coalition in Afghanistan, President of Brookings Institution
- Steve Bannon (1983), White House chief strategist and Counselor to the President under President Trump
- José Durão Barroso (1987), President of the European Commission and former prime minister of Portugal
- Philip Bilden (1986), U.S. secretary of the Navy nominee in the first Trump administration
- Jean-Charles Brisard (born 1968), French international consultant
- Bill Bryant, Seattle port commissioner from 2008 to 2015
- George Casey (1970), U.S. Army chief of staff
- Laura Chinchilla Miranda (1959), 46th president of Costa Rica
- Joseph Cirincione (1983), former president of the Ploughshares Fund
- Paul Clement (1988), U.S. solicitor general and acting U.S. attorney general
- Bill Clinton (1968), 42nd president of the United States
- Anne Dias-Griffin (1993), hedge fund manager
- Stéphane Dujarric (1988), Spokesman for UN Secretaries-General Kofi Annan, Ban Ki-moon and António Guterres
- Richard Durbin (1966), U.S. senator from Illinois, Majority Whip of the United States Senate
- Felipe VI (1991), King of Spain
- Luis Fortuño (1982), Governor of Puerto Rico
- Dexter Goei (1993), CEO of Altice
- Antonio Gracias, (1993), billionaire, Valor Equity Partners, Director of Tesla Motors and SpaceX; Estimated to be one of the 50 richest people in the world based on his stake in the Spacex public offering.
- Christopher Grady, Vice Chairman of U.S. Joint Chiefs of Staff
- Dalia Grybauskaitė, President of Lithuania
- Alexander Haig (1961), U.S. secretary of state under Ronald Reagan, Supreme Allied Commander Europe of NATO (1974–79)
- Daniel Henninger, columnist, Deputy Editorial Page Editor The Wall Street Journal, shared Pulitzer prize winner
- Mushahid Hussain, Opposition Leader in Pakistan, candidate for President of Pakistan in 2008
- Christopher Hyland (1970), American public affairs strategist and diplomatic advisor; Deputy National Political Director for Ethnic Constituencies in the Bill Clinton 1992 presidential campaign
- James Matthew Jones (1983), global health expert and philanthropist
- James L. Jones (1966), U.S. national security advisor under President Obama
- Eugen Jurzyca, Minister of Education of Slovakia
- John F. Kelly (1984), Retired Marine general, the 5th U.S. Secretary of Homeland Security and White House chief of staff in the first Trump Administration
- Kathleen Kingsbury (2001) Opinion Editor, New York Times, Pulitzer Prize winner
- Željko Komšić, member of the Presidency of Bosnia and Herzegovina
- Taro Kono (1986), Foreign Minister of Japan
- Gloria Macapagal Arroyo (1968), president of the Philippines from 2001 to 2010
- David Malpass (1982), President of the World Bank
- Denis McDonough (1996), President Obama's chief of staff and former deputy national security advisor, Secretary of Veteran's Affairs in Biden administration
- Kayleigh McEnany (2010), Fox Commentator; press secretary to President Trump
- Maeve Kennedy McKean (2009), attorney and U.S. health official
- Mick Mulvaney (1989), Director of U.S. Office of Management and Budget and White House Chief of Staff under President Trump
- Megan Mylan (1992) Academy Award Winner
- Kirstjen Nielsen (1994), U.S. secretary of homeland security under President Trump
- Darcy Olsen, CEO of the Goldwater Institute
- Jon Ossoff, (2009), U.S. senator from Georgia
- Sandra Oudkirk, first female director of the American Institute in Taiwan (AIT)
- Greg Penner, billionaire, Chairman, Walmart, the world's largest corporation by revenue and is the co-owner of the Denver Broncos and Colorado Rockies
- Armand Peschard-Sverdrup, Mexican political scientist
- Stacey Plaskett (1988) Governor of the Virgin Islands
- Pat Quinn (1969), Governor of Illinois
- Carl Reiner (1943), actor, film producer, film director, Emmy Award winner
- Tony Ressler (1981), billionaire and owner of the Atlanta Hawks
- Matthew A. Reynolds (1986), former assistant secretary of state for legislative affairs (2008–2009)
- Chris Sacca (1997), billionaire, Founder of Lowercase Capital
- Therese Shaheen (1980), Chairman of the American Institute of Taiwan, 2002–2004; businesswoman
- Arjun Singh Sethi (2003), civil rights writer and lawyer
- Debora Spar (1984), Former president, Barnard College at Columbia University, member of the board of directors of Goldman Sachs, first female president of Lincoln Center
- Courtney Stadd (1981), NASA chief of staff from 2001 to 2003
- Trae Stephens (2006) billionaire, partner at Founders Fund
- Daniel Sullivan (1993), U.S. senator from Alaska
- Kent Syverud (1977), President, University of Michigan
- George Tenet (1976), Director of the CIA from 1997 to 2004
- Matthew VanDyke, freedom fighter and Prisoner of War (POW) in the 2011 Libyan Civil War
- Marcus Wallenberg, (1980) billionaire, a banker and industrialist
- Margaret Weichert (1989), deputy director for management in the Office of Management and Budget, Director of the U.S. Office of Personnel Management
- Nawaf Obaid (1996), political scientist and former Saudi foreign policy advisor
- Igor Danchenko (2009), geopolitical analyst known for sourcing the Steele dossier
- Anthony Clark Arend (1980), professor of government and foreign service at Georgetown University
