= Georgetown SFS Asia-Pacific =

- Type: Jakarta (Asia Pacific) main campus of Georgetown University
- Established: November 13, 2023; 2 years ago
- Parent institution: Georgetown University
- Rector: Yuhki Tajima
- Location: Plaza Office Tower, Level 37, Jl M.H. Thamrin Kav 28, Central Jakarta, Jakarta, Indonesia

Georgetown SFS Asia-Pacific (GSAP) is a campus of Georgetown University's Edmund A. Walsh School of Foreign Service (SFS) in Jakarta, Indonesia. It is the first campus of an American university to open in Indonesia. The campus is located in the Plaza Office Tower in Jakarta's central business district.

== History ==
The campus was originally announced on November 13, 2023 by then President of Indonesia Joko Widodo during a visit to Washington, D.C. The campus was planned in collaboration with Indonesia's Ministry of Education, Culture, Research, and Technology.

The campus opened in January 2025, with the launch of an executive master’s in diplomacy and international affairs (EMDIA) program. The campus also launched a policy lab program that aims to connect D.C.-based graduate students to issues impacting the global south. Yuhki Tajima, Founding Rector of Georgetown SFS Asia Pacific.

The campus plans to become a hub for global south studies and complement Georgetown's existing campuses in Washington, D.C. and Doha, Qatar.

On 26 November 2025, the GSAP was formally inaugurated during a ceremony attended by Indonesian government representatives including Vice Minister of Higher Education, Science and Technology, Stella Christie.

=== Academic Programs ===
The GSAP provides various programs including a Masters in Diplomacy and International Affairs (MDIA) which is a nine-month program of combined study in Jakarta, Doha and Washington, D.C., and an Asia Pacific Accelerate Master’s Program, with one year of undergraduate studies in Jakarta and one year in Washington, D.C.
