= Maurice Jackson =

American historian

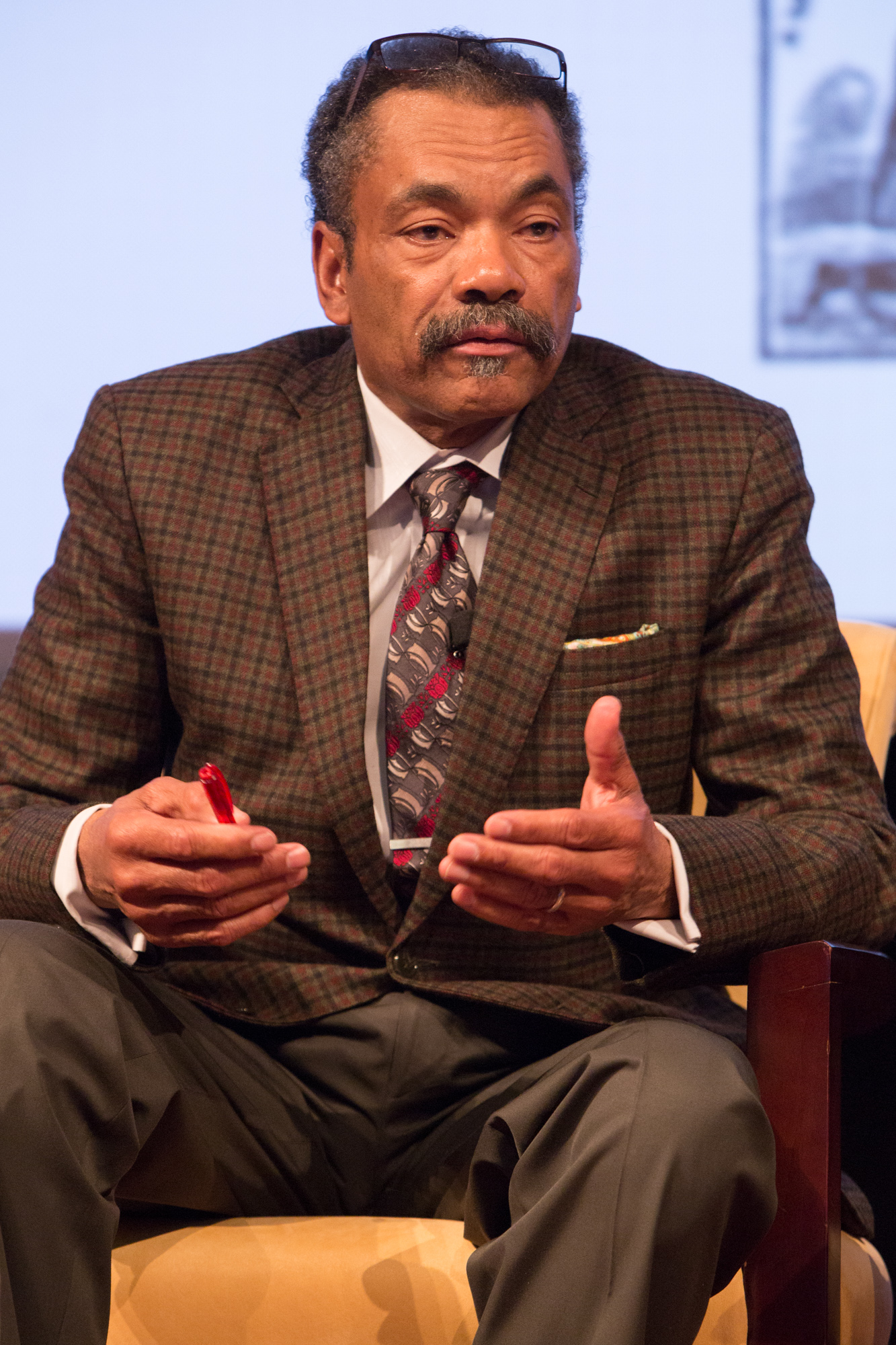
Dr. Jackson in 2016

Maurice Jackson is an American scholar and political activist. He is currently an Associate Professor of History and African American Studies and an Affiliated Professor of Performing Arts (Jazz) at Georgetown University in Washington, D.C., in addition to being a visiting professor at its Qatar campus.

== Career ==
Jackson teaches Atlantic, African American history, and the history of Washington, D.C. at Georgetown University. He also teaches African American history and Jazz history. He is currently working on a social, political, and cultural history of African Americans in Washington (1790 to the present). Jackson earned his BA in Political Economy at Antioch College, his MA in History at Georgetown University, and his Ph.D. in History at Georgetown University.

== Publications ==
His book, Let This Voice be Heard: Anthony Benezet, Father of Atlantic Abolitionism was published in 2009 by the University of Pennsylvania Press. He is co-editor with Jacqueline Bacon of African Americans and the Haitian Revolution: Selected Essays and Historical Documents (Routledge, January 2010). "James and Esther Jackson: A Personal Introspective" appears in African American Communists and the Origins of the Modern Civil Rights Movement (Routledge, 2009). His "'Friends of the Negro! Fly with me, The path is open to the sea:' Remembering the Haitian Revolution in the History, Music, and Culture of the African American People" in Early American Studies, April 2008, and "The Rise of Abolition" in The Atlantic World, 1450-2000 (Indiana University Press, 2008).

He wrote the liner notes to the Grammy-nominated jazz CD by Charlie Haden and Hank Jones entitled Steal Away: Spirituals, Folks Songs and Hymns (Verve Records, 1995). He wrote the liner notes, as well, to Come Sunday, which was Hank Jones' last recording in the Fall of 2011.

== Honors ==
On April 19, 2009, he was inducted into the Washington, D.C. Hall of Fame for his years of service to the people of the nation's capital. He was a 2011–2012 Fellow at the Woodrow Wilson International Center for Scholars.

== Family life ==
Jackson and his wife Laura live in Washington, D.C., with their two children.
