= Rogaia Mustafa Abusharaf =

Sudanese ethnographer

- Born: 2 October 1967 (age 59); Sudan
- Education: University of Connecticut
- Occupations: Academic; Anthropologist
- Organization: Georgetown University in Qatar

Rogaia Mustafa Abusharaf is a Sudanese ethnographer and is Professor of Anthropology at Georgetown University in Qatar.

== Biography ==
Abusharaf was born on 2 October 1967 in Sudan. Her parents Mustafa and Fatima were both teachers. In 1987 she married the academic Mohamed Hussein, they have two children. She was educated at Cairo University, where she was awarded a BA from the School of Social and Political Sciences. She studied at the University of Connecticut for both her MA and her PhD.

== Research ==
Abusharaf's research focuses on the anthropology of gender, human rights and diaspora issues in Sudan, culture and politics. Migration whether inside Sudan, or externally in a major theme in her research and she has worked on Sudanese migration to North America. Her interest in Sudanese politics has led to a study of Abdel Khaliq Mahgoub, his role in the Sudanese Communist Party and his interpretation of Marxism.

She has published work on the lives of displaced women living in squatter settlements, as well as research on the migration of Sudanese women more generally. She has researched female circumcision in Africa, in particular foregrounding the experience of indigenous women's voices. She supports the need for "own voices" to be part of the critical discourse on FGM and includes other African feminist opinions in research. Her research in FGM has explored the role of colonialism in its expression. Her work on colonial Sudan includes work on Dr Ina Beasley, who was Controller of Girls' Education in the Anglo-Sudan, 1939–49.

Violence in the lives of women in Sudan is another area of Abusharaf's research, particularly within politics. This study has extended to research on how violence in Darfur is discussed within Sudan, Qatar and the United States. She has also written about the intersection of gender justice and religion in Sudan. She has worked on interpretations of feminism within the life of the radical Mona Abul-Fadl.

Abusharaf also researches relationships between Africa and the Gulf region. She has published the first research into migration to pre-oil Qatar, looking to the country's history pre-1930s.

She has previously been a visiting scholar in human rights at Harvard Law School. She is co-editor of HAWWA: Journal of Women of the Middle East and Islamic World.
