= Ina Beasley =

British female civil servant and educator in Sudan

- Born: 1898
- Died: 1994 (aged 95–96)
- Occupations: Educator, lecturer
- Employer: Sudan Service

Dr. Ina M Beasley (1898–1994) was an English educator, author and lecturer, who worked in education in Sudan from 1939 to 1949.

== Biography ==
Ina Beasley was born in England in 1898. During her early life, her family holidayed in Margate, Kent. Between 1919 and 1921, she studied at University College London, and in 1922, she was awarded a Teacher's Diploma from the Institute of Education, London. She taught in the Adult Education Department at the University of Nottingham until 1930, when she traveled with her husband to his posting in Burma. At Nottingham she became interested in Russian literature and studied for her PhD thesis on ‘The Dramatic Art of Ostrovsky’ – it was awarded externally in 1931. She published an introduction to the playwright in 1928.

During her time in Burma she worked as a lecturer and as a tutor to women students at Rangoon University. By 1939, there had been a crisis in her marriage and Beasley had returned to England with her daughter. She needed employment and having enjoyed many aspects of life in Burma, chose to join the Sudan Service. Beasley recalled in her diary that this job provided an adequate salary to cover boarding school costs for her daughter and provided enough annual leave that they could spend summer holidays together.

=== Career in Sudan ===
1939–1942	Superintendent Girls' Education (Omdurman)
1942–1949	Controller Girls' Education (Khartoum) & member of the Gordon Memorial College Council
1949	Retired from Sudan service

When Beasley took up her post in October 1939 she found that Sudanese men were not opposed to female education, but that they wanted it to produce 'good wives' not 'wage earners or autonomous thinkers'. Beasley always stressed the importance of education for its own sake. It was an interesting time to arrive in Sudan, where the country's political identity was being formed and the relationship with the British colonial authority was tightly bound to it. When Beasley arrived both education and health were undeveloped, particularly for women.

During her time in Sudan, Beasley focused on working within Sudanese cultural boundaries to produce educational change. She stated that:

"The most encouraging feature is in recognising the possibilities which are in the girls themselves, and feeling that it is they who may eventually overcome the many obstacles to development which have been placed in their way. The disheartening results in some districts are balanced by the embarrassing success in others. Perhaps if the work goes on quietly in the same unostentatious spirit at the end of the next twenty years there may be a proportionately greater tale to tell."

==== Female Genital Mutilation ====
During her career, Beasley's work in female education had a profound impact on the educational system for women in Sudan, she was also concerned with the practice of female genital mutilation, which was widely carried out. Beasley believed that change to these practices could only come through the education of women themselves and their resistance to it. Beasley had a subtle understanding of the different cultural identities within Sudan, and realised the need to work with women from them. Although she was opposed to the practice herself, and supported educational campaigns against it – she also recognised that it was an important part of cultural identity that affected both men and women. She supported female bodily autonomy – a side-effect of which could be a refusal to circumcise. She organised an educational campaign which focused on schools and organised for Sudanese teachers to tour remote schools to discuss the practice and its effects on health.

=== Later career ===
From 1951 to 1961, Beasley was Senior Lecturer in English at the Maria Grey Teacher Training College, Twickenham, and Lecturer at the Institute of Education, London. She also spent two summer lecturing at Portland State College on education in undeveloped countries. She became part of the discussion on the need for reform of the civil service pension scheme, particularly the Sudan Government British Pensioners’ Association, and suggested in a letter that women pay 4/5 of the contribution of men, because it was in line with the wages that they earned in reality. In 1969 she featured on BBC Radio 4 discussing her career in women's education in Sudan. She continued to campaign against FGM.

==== Archives ====
Beasley submitted both her professional and personal papers to a variety of archives in England. Her paperes are widely recognised as a unique source for analysis of Sudan's colonial past and the education of women in Africa. They recall the early days of air travel in Africa, amongst other anecdotes. Her work in the Sudan has been studied, with a particular focus on her views on FGM, particularly by Sudanese anthropologist Rogaia Mustafa Abusharaf. They include:

- Durham University Library, Archives and Special Collections
- London Metropolitan University: The Women's Library
- University of Oxford: Bodleian Library
- University of Oxford: St Anthony's College
