= Ahmad S. Dallal =

13th President of the American University in Cairo

- أحمد دلال

13th President of the American University in Cairo
- Incumbent
- Assumed office October 15, 2021
- Preceded by: Francis J. Ricciardone Jr. Lisa Anderson

4th Dean of Georgetown University in Qatar
- In office September 1, 2017 – October 16, 2021
- President: John J. DeGioia
- Preceded by: James Reardon-Anderson
- Succeeded by: Safwan M. Masri

Personal details
- Education: American University in Beirut (BE); Columbia University (MS, PhD)

Ahmad S. Dallal (Arabic: أحمد دلال) is a scholar of Islamic studies and an academic administrator. He is the current president of The American University in Cairo.

== Biography ==
Dallal received his bachelor's degree in engineering from the American University of Beirut. He worked in the aviation industry before earning his master's and doctorate from Columbia University.

Dallal taught at Stanford University, Yale University, and Smith College before joining the Georgetown University faculty, where he was an associate professor of Arabic and Islamic studies and Chair of Georgetown's Arabic and Islamic Studies department. His research focused on the history of learning and the history of sciences in Islamic societies as well as Islamic thoughts and movements. He held the Dwight H. Terry Lectureship at Yale University in 2008, titled Islam, Science, and the Challenge of History.

Dallal served as the provost of the American University of Beirut from 2009 to 2015 before returning to teach history at the university. He was named dean of Georgetown University in Qatar in 2017.

In 2021, Dallal was named 13th President of The American University in Cairo. He is the first Arab-American to serve as president of the university.

Dallal speaks both English and Arabic, and can also read Persian, German and French.
