= Gerd Nonneman =

Belgian scholar (born 1959)

Gerd Nonneman (Temse, 16 May 1959) is a professor of international relations and Gulf studies at the School of Foreign Service at Georgetown University's campus in Qatar (GU-Q, also often referred to as SFS-Q), where he served as dean from 2011 to 2016. Before joining Georgetown University, he held the Al-Qasimi Chair in Gulf Studies, and a chair in international relations and Middle East politics, at the University of Exeter. He is a former director of the Institute of Arab and Islamic Studies (IAIS) and of the Centre for Gulf Studies (CGS) at that university. He is also a former executive director of the British Society for Middle Eastern Studies (BRISMES).

== Early life ==
Born in Flanders (Temse, 1959) and educated at Ghent University, Belgium in Oriental philology (Arabic) and, at postgraduate level, in development studies, Nonneman subsequently worked in the commercial sector in Iraq during the early 1980s. Returning to graduate studies in the UK in 1984, he obtained his PhD in politics at the University of Exeter, specialising in the politics of the Middle East. After teaching Middle East politics and political economy at Manchester and Exeter Universities, and a spell as visiting professor at the International University of Japan, he taught international relations and Middle East politics at Lancaster University from 1993 to 2007, at which point he returned to Exeter to take up the Al-Qasimi Chair in Gulf Studies, until his appointment as dean of Georgetown University's SFS-Qatar in 2011.

He was a member of the UK's 2001 National Research Assessment Exercise (RAE) panel on Middle Eastern Studies, and served as executive director of the British Society for Middle Eastern Studies (BRISMES) between 1998 and 2002. He was associate fellow of the Middle East Programme at Chatham House (Royal Institute of International Affairs) until 2012.

== Other roles ==
Prof. Nonneman is co-editor of the Journal of Arabian Studies (Routledge), published in association with Georgetown University Qatar (GUQ) and the Association for Gulf and Arabian Peninsula Studies (AGAPS).

He has acted as a consultant to or worked with a range of companies, national and international official institutions including the Foreign & Commonwealth Office, foreign ministries in Europe and the Middle East, the European Commission, and various NGOs – ranging from Amnesty International to the Bertelsmann Foundation. He has also been a regular media commentator on Middle Eastern and Gulf affairs, and has frequently acted as expert witness on human rights cases relating to the Middle East.

== Notable works ==
Recent works include:

Books:

- Al-Mamlaka Al-'arabiyya al-sa'udiyya fi-l-mizan [Saudi Arabia in the Balance] (updated Arabic edition: Beirut: Center for Arab Unity Studies, 2012)
- Saudi Arabia in the Balance: Political Economy, Society, Foreign Affairs (New York University Press, 2006 / Hurst & Co, 2005) (co-editor & contributor, with Paul Aarts)
- Analyzing Middle Eastern Foreign Policies, and the relationship with Europe (editor)(Routledge, 2005)

Articles/chapters/papers:

- ‘European Policies Towards the Gulf: Patterns, Dynamics, Evolution, and the case of the Qatar Blockade’, in David Roberts (ed.), Reflecting on the Qatar Crisis: Qatar and its Neighbours (Routledge, 2022)
- ‘The Journal of Arabian Studies and the Development of Gulf and Arabian Peninsula Studies’ (with James Onley), Journal of Arabian Studies, Vol. 10, no. 1 (July 2020) [published February 2021], pp. 1-50. (https://doi.org/10.1080/21534764.2020.1847245).
- ‘The Qatar Crisis through the lens of Foreign Policy Analysis’, in Rory Miller (ed.), The Gulf Crisis: the View from Qatar (Doha: HBK University Press (2018), pp. 90-100.
- 'The Heritage Boom in the Gulf: Critical Perspectives', Special Section in Journal of Arabian Studies, Vol. 7, no. 2 (December 2017), (co-edited with Marc Valeri);
- Ruling Families and Business Elites in the Gulf Monarchies: Ever Closer? (Chatham House, 2016);
- Al-Mamlaka Al-'arabiyya al-sa'udiyya fi-l-mizan [Saudi Arabia in the Balance] (updated Arabic edition: Beirut: Center for Arab Unity Studies, 2012)
- Yemen, Saudi Arabia and the Gulf States: Elite Politics, Street Protests and Regional Diplomacy (London: Chatham House, 2011)
- ‘Europe, the US, and the Gulf after the Cold War’, in Viktor Mauer & Daniel Möckli (eds.), European-American Relations and the Middle East: From Suez to Iraq (Routledge, 2010);
- ‘“Terrorism” and Political Violence in the Middle East and North Africa: Drivers and Limitations‘, in Asaf Siniver (ed.), International Terrorism Post-9/11: Comparative Dynamics and Responses (Routledge, 2010), pp. 13–36;
- ‘Political Reform in the Gulf Monarchies: From Liberalisation to Democratisation? A Comparative Perspective’, in A. Ehteshami & S. Wright (eds.), Reform in the Middle East Oil Monarchies (Ithaca Press, 2008), pp. 3–45;
- ‘EU-GGC Relations: Dynamics, Perspectives and the Issue of Political Reform’, Journal of Social Affairs [AUS, Sharjah], Vol. 23, No. 92, Winter 2006, pp. 13–33;
- EU-GCC Relations: Dynamics, Patterns and Perspectives, Gulf Papers Series (Dubai: Gulf Research Center, 2006)

=== Notable earlier works (books) ===
- Muslim Communities in the New Europe (Reading: Ithaca Press, 1996).
- Het Midden-Oosten Hertekend [The Middle East Redrawn] (Brussels: VUB Press (Free University of Brussels Press), 1996).
- Political and Economic Liberalization: dynamics and linkages in comparative perspective (Boulder, Col.: Lynne Rienner, 1996).
- The Middle East and Europe: The Search for Stability and Integration (London: Federal Trust for Education and Research, 1993)
- War and Peace in the Gulf: domestic politics and regional relations into the 1990s (Reading: Ithaca Press, 1991) (with Anoushiravan Ehteshami).
- Development, Administration and Aid in the Middle East (London: Routledge, 1988).
- Iraq, the Gulf States & the War: A changing relationship, 1980-1986 and beyond (London: Ithaca Press, 1986).
