= Daniel Kaufmann (economist) =

Economist

Daniel Kaufmann is the co-founder and president emeritus of the Natural Resource Governance Institute (NRGI), which resulted from the merger of the Revenue Watch Institute – Natural Resource Charter. He is also a senior fellow at R4D, and at the Brookings Institution (non-resident). He is a visiting professor at the University of Sussex. He served in the international board of the Extractive Industries Transparency Initiative and is a member in a number of advisory and governance boards on anti-corruption, addressing state capture, and management of natural resources. He has been a member in high-level expert commissions such as at the Organisation for Economic Co-operation and Development, the Inter-American Development Bank and the Mo Ibrahim Foundation.

In the past, he was a director at the World Bank Institute, leading work on governance and anti-corruption. He was also a senior manager and lead economist at the World Bank, writing and working on many countries around the world, and was a visiting scholar at Harvard University. He has also served in other councils in the past, including at the World Economic Forum.

== Early life ==
Kaufmann was born and grew up in Santiago, Chile, the son of Jewish immigrants that escaped Germany in 1939. He later received a B.A. in economics and statistics at the Hebrew University in Jerusalem and subsequently an M.A. and Ph.D. in economics at Harvard.

== Career ==
At the World Bank, he held positions working on programs in Eastern Europe and the former Soviet Union, Africa and Latin America, as well as conducting applied research around the globe. First as a senior economist and then as a lead economist, he specialized on trade, industry, private sector, regulation, macroeconomics, governance and anti-corruption. After the collapse of the Soviet Union, he became the first chief of mission of the World Bank to Ukraine, where he led the bank's program of support for economic reforms, as well as developing survey techniques to measure corruption and the unofficial economy. Thereafter, as a director of the World Bank Institute, he initiated and led the program on global governance and anti-corruption. He also served as lead economist in the research department and was later a manager of the finance, regulation and governance unit. He co-authored a number of publications and books, such as the World Development Report, and “The Quality of Growth”, the "Investment Climate around the World" and the "Governance Matters" series.

He was also a visiting scholar at Harvard. Since 2009, Kaufmann has been affiliated with the Brookings Institution, first as a senior fellow, leading the work on governance and anti-corruption, and since late 2012, as a non-resident senior fellow. Between 2012 and 2020, he was the president and CEO of the Natural Resource Governance Institute (NRGI), an independent global policy institute focused on research and evidence-driven policy advice and advocacy, with operations in over a dozen countries. He became President Emeritus at NRGI on 31 July 2020.

Kaufmann is a researcher, policy advisor to leaders of states, multilateral organizations, industry and nongovernmental organizations. He is also a frequent keynote speaker on governance and development. With his teams, he has developed approaches to construct indicators for country governance (e.g., the Worldwide Governance Indicators, the Resource Governance Index) and the State Capture Index), and designed diagnostic tools and survey methodologies for good governance and anti-corruption programs.

He has also provided practical advice to countries and their government and civil society leaders, based on his research on economic development, governance, the unofficial economy, macroeconomics, investment, corruption, privatization, and urban and labor economics. His writings with co-authors are highly cited and among the most downloaded in the Social Science Research Network.

== Professional contribution ==
=== Governance and Corruption ===
While at the World Bank during the 1990s, Kaufmann and his colleague Aart Kraay developed the Worldwide Governance Indicators (WGI). The Worldwide Governance Indicators measure six dimensions of governance: Voice and Accountability, Political Stability and Absence of Violence, Government Effectiveness, Regulatory Quality, Rule of Law and Control of Corruption. The WGI project covers more than 200 countries since 1996, and is updated on a yearly basis. The methodology used for the indicators’ construction can be found in The Worldwide Governance Indicators: Methodology and Analytical Issues. The WGI indicators are used by multiple organizations, countries, risk rating agencies and industry bodies. In addition to its methodological approach, country coverage and the ability to monitor governance performance of countries for over two decades, the WGI was also the first such indicator that addressed quantitatively the measurement of its own margins of error (confidence intervals), initiating a trend in the field.

With colleagues at the World Bank, he also led the development and implementation of in-depth, in-country governance and anti-corruption diagnostic tools, which were carried out in dozens of countries as inputs to governance reform programs.

=== State Capture and Legal Corruption ===
Kaufmann, with colleagues, also developed new approaches to measure governance and corruption, focused first on the post-socialist countries in transition, and, with Joel Hellman, launched a project on what they labelled as the challenge of state capture, which focused on the transition economies of the former Soviet Union during the late 1990s (in articles such as "Seize the state, seize the day: State capture, corruption, and influence in transition"). The notion of state capture has since become more widely applied, and recently they have provided expert testimony on the topic to the Judicial Commission of Inquiry into Allegations of State Capture of South Africa. In 2024, Kaufmann published an article entitled "State Capture Matters" where he traced the evolution of the field and presented the first global measure of the phenomena, the State Capture Index (SCI), tracking the extent of capture in 172 countries between 1996-2022.

Related to a key aspect of state capture, which often takes place via legal means (via loopholes, and since the existing laws may have been subject to capture as well), Kaufmann had also co-authored (with Pedro Vicente) one of the first theoretical and empirical articles on the notion of “legal corruption”. They analyzed how laws can be shaped so as to legalize certain acts, which would usually be construed as unethical or corrupt.

=== Good Governance and Anti-Corruption Programs ===
At an applied level, Kaufmann has worked on concrete programs and advised leaders on governance, corruption and state capture matters at the global, regional and national level, including in the natural resource sector. He has also researched the relevance of civil liberties to address corruption and improve development prospects, as well as the links between human rights and corruption control. He has also recently been an expert member of high level advisory panels for multilateral organizations, such as the Inter-American Development Bank, co-authoring the Report of the Expert Advisory Group on Anti-Corruption, Transparency, and Integrity in Latin America and the Caribbean, (selected by Foreign Affairs as one of the top books of 2019) as well as a co-author of the report to the Organisation for Economic Co-operation and Development as a member of the High-Level Advisory Group on Anti-Corruption and Integrity to that organization.

=== Natural Resource Governance ===
The Natural Resource Governance Institute, which Kaufmann co-founded and led until 2020, released the Resource Governance Index in 2017. The index focuses on transparency and accountability in resource-rich countries and provided evidence on the substantial governance and implementation deficits in most countries surveyed, while also identifying successes, including in emerging economies. Other recent publications on governance and natural resources have appeared at The Brookings Institution, as well as opinion pieces in the Financial Times. His work is widely referenced in academic circles and in the international media.

The Unofficial Economy

During the 1990s Kaufmann co-authored a number of articles on the unofficial economy, mostly with Simon Johnson (recent Nobel laureate in Economics, for work on other topics). In recent times he provided an update on that line of work on informality and the unofficial economy at a keynote address in an international conference sponsored by the OECD and the Inter-American Development Bank in Lima, Peru.

== Selected publications ==
Kaufmann has contributed to the fields of governance, corruption and development for over three decades, including these publications:

- State Capture Matters: Considerations And Empirics Toward A Worldwide Measure Chapter in “Public Sector Performance, Corruption and State Capture in a Globalized World”, Susan Rose-Ackerman, ed. (2024)
- The Worldwide Governance Indicators: Methodology and Analytical Issues (with A. Kraay & Mastruzzi, M.) Hague Journal on the Rule of Law, 3(2), 220–246, 2011.
- Governance Matters III: Governance Indicators for 1996-2002 (with A. Kraay & Mastruzzi, M.), World Bank Economic Review, 18(4):253-287, The World Bank: Washington, D.C., 2004
- Seize the State, Seize the Day: State Capture, Corruption, and Influence in Transition (with J.S. Hellman & Jones, G.) Journal of Comparative Economics, 31(4), 751–773, 2003
- Civil Liberties, Democracy, and the Performance of Government Projects (with J. Isham & Pritchett, L.) World Bank Economic Review, Vol. 11, No. 2, pp. 219–242, 1997
- Growth Without Governance [with comments] (with A. Kraay). Economía 3 (1) 169–229, 2002
- The Unofficial Economy in Transition (with S. Johnson and Shleifer, A.). Brookings Papers on Economic Activity, 1997
- Regulatory Discretion and the Unofficial Economy (with Simon Johnson and Pablo Zoido). American Economic Review, Vol. 88, No. 2, 1998
- Corruption Matters. Finance & Development, 52(3), pp. 20–23. IMF, Washington, D.C., 2015
- Evidence-Based Reflections on Natural Resource Governance and Corruption in Africa. Chapter in E. Zedillo, O. Cattaneo, & H. Wheeler (Eds.), Africa at a fork in the road: taking off or disappointment once again?. Yale Center for the Study of Globalization, 2015
- Who Bribes in Public Contracting and Why: Worldwide Evidence from Firms (with A. D’Souza). Economics of Governance, 14(4), 333–367, 2013
- Transparenting Transparency: Initial Empirics and Policy Applications (with A. Bellver). MPRA Paper No. 8188, University Library of Munich, Germany, 2005
- Legal Corruption (with P. Vicente). Economics & Politics, Vol. 23, Issue 2, pp. 195–219, 2011
- Rule of Law Matters Northwestern Law Review, 2010
- Corruption, Governance and Security: Challenges for the Rich Countries and the World. Chapter in the Global Competitiveness Report 2004–2005, World Economic Forum, Geneva, October 2004
- Investment Climate around the World: Voices of the Firms from the World Business Environment Survey (with G. Batra & Stone A.). The World Bank, 2003.
- The Quality of Growth (book with V. Thomas and co-authors). The World Bank, 2000.
- Does ‘Grease Money’ Speed Up the Wheels of Commerce? (with S.J. Wei). International Monetary Fund: Washington, D.C., 2000
- The Forgotten Rationale for Policy Reform: The Productivity of Investment Projects (with J. Isham). Quarterly Journal of Economics, 114(1):149-184, 1999
- Corruption: The Facts. Foreign Policy, 107, Carnegie Endowment for International Peace: Washington, D.C., 1997
- World Development Report 1991: The Challenge of Development (with V. Thomas et al.). World Bank. New York: Oxford University Press, 1991.
- Report of the Expert Advisory Group on Anti-Corruption, Transparency, and Integrity in Latin America and the Caribbean, (selected by Foreign Affairs as one of the top books of 2019)

== Global indicators ==
- Worldwide Governance Indicators
- Resource Governance Index
- Ibrahim Index of African Governance
- State Capture Index
