= Safwan M. Masri =

Professor, academic administrator and scholar

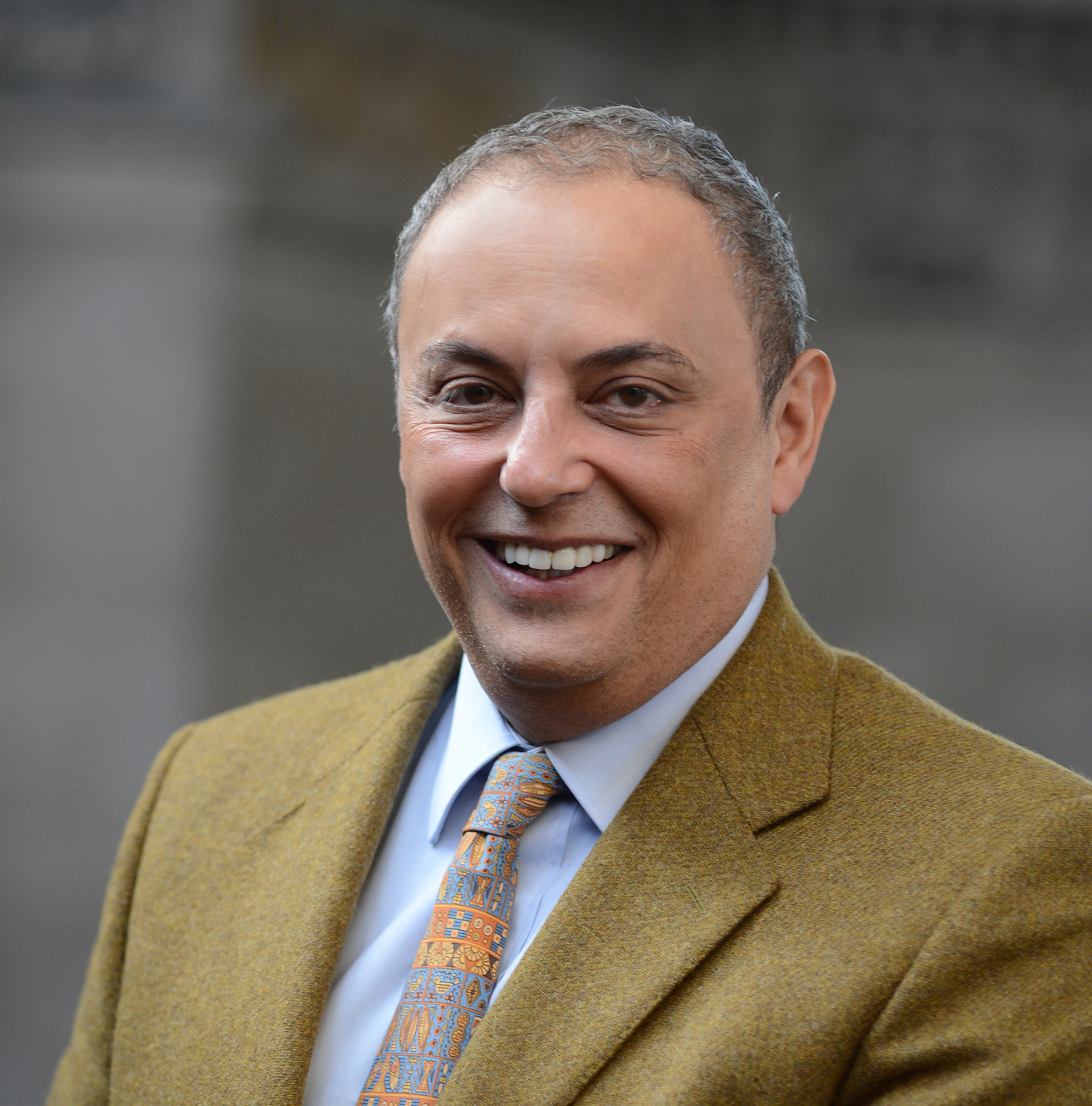
- Masri in 2015

5th Dean of Georgetown University in Qatar
- Incumbent
- Assumed office October 2, 2022
- President: John J. DeGioia
- Preceded by: Ahmad S. Dallal

Executive Vice President of Columbia University
- In office July 26, 2012 – June 30, 2022
- President: Lee Bollinger

Personal details
- Education: Purdue University (BS, MS); Stanford University (PhD)

Safwan M. Masri is a Palestinian-Jordanian-American professor, senior academic administrator, global educator, and scholar of education in the Arab world. He is the current Dean of Georgetown University in Qatar. Previously, he served as Executive Vice President for Global Centers and Global Development at Columbia University and was head of Columbia Global Centers (2011–2022) as well as director of Columbia Global Center in Amman since its founding in 2009.

Masri's tenure at Georgetown's campus in Qatar witnessed faculty expansion by 50 percent, strengthening and expanding the academic offerings at the Qatar campus. He also led GU-Q to introduce a new major, Science, Technology and International Affairs, marking a milestone in the diversity of academic offerings. His tenure saw GU-Q's applicant pool grow four-folds, and the admit rate was at a historic low of less than 9 percent for the Class of 2030. He is lauded for expanding campus cooperation between Georgetown in DC and Georgetown in Qatar, and for the renewal of a ten-year partnership with Qatar Foundation, securing the future of Georgetown in the region.

== Life and career ==
Masri earned his B.S. in 1982 and his M.S. in 1984 in Industrial Engineering from Purdue University. In 1988, he was awarded a Ph.D. in Industrial Engineering and Engineering Management from Stanford University.

Masri joined Columbia University in 1988 as a professor of operations management at Columbia Business School, where he served as vice dean from 1993-2006. Previously, he was a visiting professor at INSEAD, and taught at Stanford University and Santa Clara University.

At the request of King Abdullah II of Jordan, Masri led the effort to establish King's Academy in Jordan, the first coeducational boarding school in the Middle East, and was founding chairman of its board of trustees. An advisor to Queen Rania Al Abdullah of Jordan, Masri was founding chairman of the Queen Rania Teacher Academy.

Masri currently holds a senior research scholar appointment at Columbia's School of International and Public Affairs (SIPA).

== Columbia Global Centers ==
In 2009, Columbia University president Lee C. Bollinger created the Columbia Global Centers, a network of regional hubs of programming and research. These centers work to advance Columbia's global mission as well as extend the University's reach to address the pressing demands of our global society and are located in: Amman, Jordan; Beijing, China; Istanbul, Turkey; Mumbai, India; Nairobi, Kenya; Paris, France; Rio de Janeiro, Brazil; and Santiago, Chile. Tunis, Tunisia;

== Awards and recognition ==
Masri was awarded the 2003 American Service Award from the American-Arab Anti-Discrimination Committee; and the Robert W. Lear Service Award, the Dean's Award for Teaching Excellence in a Core Course, and the Singhvi Professor of the Year for Scholarship in the Classroom Award, all from Columbia University.

Masri is a lifetime member of the Council on Foreign Relations, an honorary fellow of the Foreign Policy Association, and a member of the International Advisory Council of the World Congress for Middle Eastern Studies (WOCMES). He serves on the Board of Directors for AMIDEAST and on the Global Advisory Board for the Chazen Institute at Columbia Business School. Masri is also a trustee of International College in Beirut and the Welfare Association (Taawon) in Ramallah, and a director of Endeavor Jordan.
