= Carol Lancaster =

American diplomat

Carol J. Lancaster

Dean, Edmund A. Walsh School of Foreign Service
- In office 2010–2013

Deputy Administrator of the United States Agency for International Development
- In office 1993–1996

Personal details
- Born: August 23, 1942
- Died: 22 October 2014 (aged 72)
- Education: Georgetown University, London School of Economics and Political Science
- Occupation: Diplomat, professor, academic administrator

Carol J. Lancaster (August 23, 1942 – October 22, 2014) was an American diplomat and academic who served as Assistant Secretary of State for Africa from 1980 to 1981, and Deputy Administrator of the United States Agency for International Development (USAID) from 1993 to 1996. Following her career at the State Department, Lancaster served as the dean of the Edmund A. Walsh School of Foreign Service at Georgetown University from 2010 to 2013.

== Early life and education ==
Lancaster was born on August 23, 1942, in Washington, DC. She received her BS in Foreign Service from the Edmund A. Walsh School of Foreign Service at Georgetown University in 1964, and her PhD in 1972 from the London School of Economics and Political Science.

== Career ==
After receiving her PhD, Lancaster worked as a federal budget planner and as an aide for U.S. Representative David R. Obey. She served as a senior member of the United States Department of State's senior planning staff from 1977 to 1980. From 1980 to 1981, she held the post of Deputy Assistant Secretary of State for African Affairs. From 1993 to 1996, she was the Deputy Administrator of the United States Agency for International Development, under the Administration of President Bill Clinton

In 1981, Lancaster began teaching at Georgetown University, while still at the State Department. In 2010, Lancaster succeeded Robert L. Gallucci as the Dean of the School of Foreign Service, serving until she retired in 2013. Her book, A Song to My City: Washington, DC, with her son Douglas Farrar, was published by Georgetown University Press in 2016.
