= Columbia Global Centers =

Research outposts established by Columbia University

Columbia Global Centers are research outposts established by Columbia University in different locations around the world, as part of its initiative to further establish an international research university. The first of these centers opened in March 2009 in Beijing, China, and Amman, Jordan, and Columbia opened facilities in Paris, France, and Mumbai, India, in March 2010 and Istanbul, Turkey in November 2011. Locations in Nairobi, Rio de Janeiro and Santiago de Chile were opened in 2012 and 2013. An additional location in Tunis opened in 2018.

== Purpose ==
Columbia created the global centers "to promote and facilitate international collaborations, new research projects, academic programming and study abroad, enhancing Columbia’s historical commitment to global scholarship." Columbia Global Centers act as regional hubs for a wide range of activities intended to enhance research in respective areas and at Columbia. The university aims to establish a network of centers in international capitals that brings together regional private enterprise, public officials, scholars, and students to collaboratively address global issues.

== Centers ==
=== Amman ===
Columbia Global Centers | Amman was launched in March 2009 and was led by Professor Safwan M. Masri until 2022 as Executive Vice President for Global Centers and Global Development. The Amman Center's projects with Columbia's Mailman School of Public Health, School of Social Work, and Fu Foundation School of Engineering and Applied Science are focused on building local capacity in Jordan and the region. The Center's course offerings for undergraduate and graduate students include Arabic Language Studies, Democracy and Constitutional Engineering in the Middle East, Regional Environmental Sustainability, and the Summer Ecosystem Experience for Undergraduates Program, as well as workshops in architecture and urban design. The Center also organizes a vibrant ongoing public lecture series and hosts Studio-X Amman, a regional platform for research and programming in architecture, co-run with Columbia's Graduate School of Architecture, Planning and Preservation.

=== Beijing ===
Columbia Global Centers | Beijing was launched in March 2009. The Center's programmatic themes include aging and public health, arts and culture, entrepreneurship, and sustainability. The Center runs an active public events program featuring Columbia faculty and local experts on diverse topics ranging from international economics to environmental engineering to film studies. The Center hosts student summer programs and organizes workshops throughout the year to engage Columbia undergraduate and graduate students and young scholars in Beijing, such as the Graduate Students and Young Scholars Meeting Program, which is organized in partnership with Columbia's Weatherhead East Asian Institute. The Center also hosts diverse projects under the President's Global Innovation Fund, such as Ideas on Aging, a collaboration with Columbia's Mailman School of Public Health.

=== Istanbul ===
Columbia Global Centers | Istanbul was launched in November 2011. A hub for students and scholars from Columbia and universities in the region, the Center hosts several educational programs, including summer programs on Democracy and Constitutional Engineering, Balkan Transcultural Studies, and Byzantine and Ottoman Studies, as well as the Global Seminar on Byzantine and Modern Greek Encounters.

=== Mumbai ===
Columbia Global Centers | Mumbai was launched in March 2010. The Center conducts interdisciplinary research, designs training opportunities for professionals and field opportunities for students, and disseminates research to wider audiences in academia, government, civil society, and the private sector.

=== Nairobi ===
Columbia Global Centers | Nairobi opened its doors in January 2012. The Center began in collaboration with Columbia's Earth Institute and hosted the Millennium Villages Project, which directly supported half a million people through operations in six African countries. The Center's major programmatic themes include sustainability, public health, entrepreneurship, and environmental sciences. The Center hosts the African Nutritional Sciences Research Consortium, which brings together academic and research institutions across East Africa to build a PhD training program in basic laboratory research in nutritional sciences.

=== Paris ===
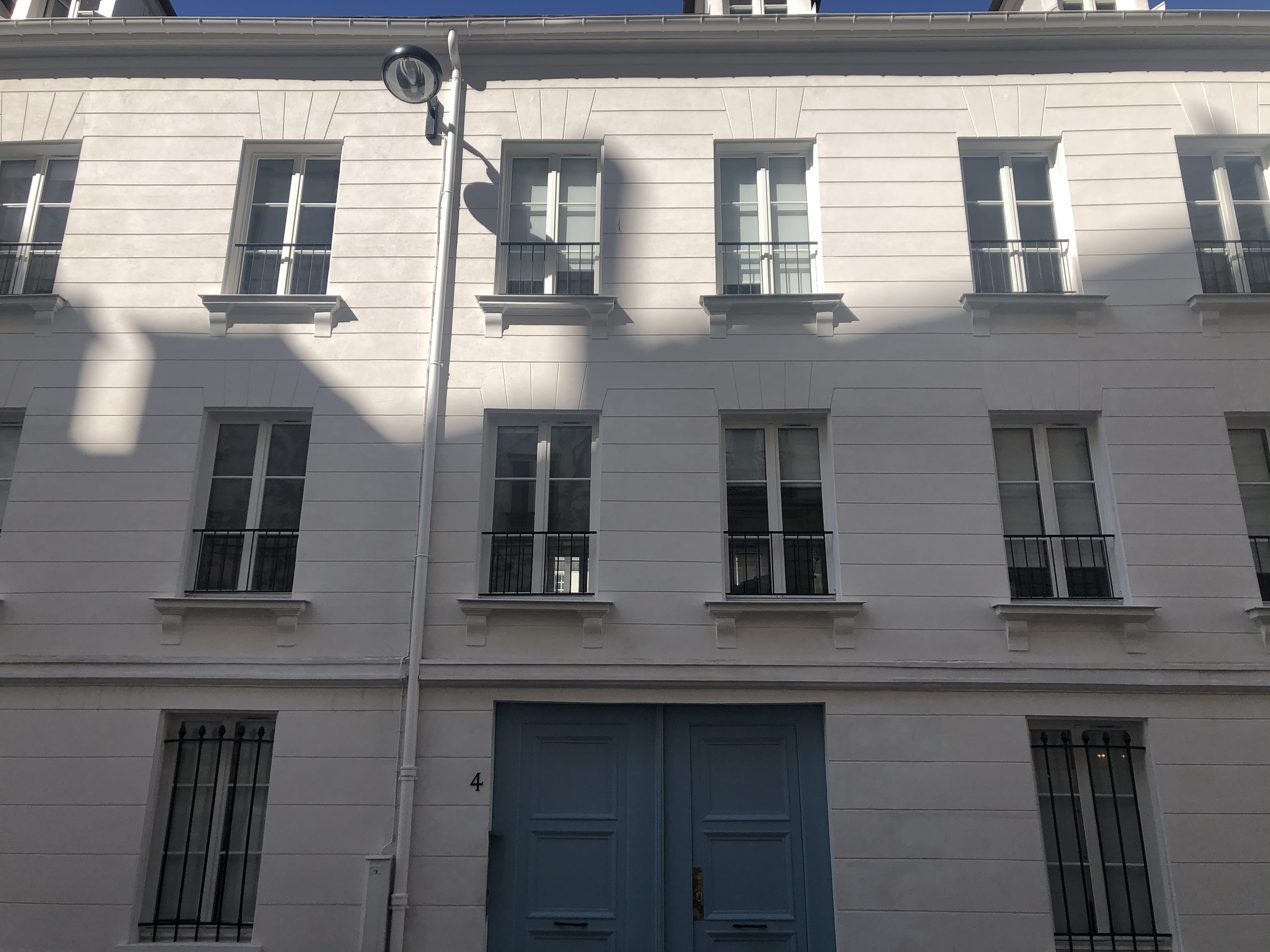
Columbia Global Center Paris entrance

Columbia Global Centers | Paris is based in historic Reid Hall, which was gifted to Columbia in 1964. Launched in 2010 and led by Paul LeClerc, the Center hosts a large undergraduate program, a Master of Arts in History and Literature, and a joint undergraduate/graduate architecture program. The Paris Center's French academic partners include the École normale supérieure; the Universities of Paris 1, 4, and 7; and the Institut d’études politiques (Sciences Po). The Center also hosts a Master of Public Health, run jointly by the École des hautes études en santé publique and Columbia's Mailman School of Public Health, and the Executive Master in Technology Management, run by Columbia's School of Professional Studies.

=== Rio de Janeiro ===
Columbia Global Centers | Rio de Janeiro, launched in March 2013.

=== Santiago ===
Columbia Global Centers | Santiago was launched in March 2012 and is led by Karen Poniachik.

=== Tunis ===
Columbia Global Centers | Tunis was launched in March 2018. Several Tunisian nationals studied at Columbia, and went on to become successful business people, diplomats, and intellectuals. Columbia faculty were involved in a number of projects in Tunisia, especially after 2011, and the country's trajectory interested a number of Columbia's students and scholars.
