= List of Mapudungun placenames =

The following is a listing of placenames from the Mapudungun language, generally from Chile and southwestern Argentina.

Note: this list includes only currently used placenames that have a Mapudungun etymology for at least part of their name

== A ==
Placename	Meaning	Region (Chile) or Province (Argentina)	Type	Comments
Abtao	end/limit of the territory	Los Lagos	channel, island	contested (pro con)
Achao	sandy and protected harbour	Los Lagos	beach, channel, city/town	
Aconcagua	place of heathers	Valparaíso, Mendoza	mountain, river	
Allipén		Araucanía, Bío-Bío	river	
Ancud	to dry	Los Lagos	city/town, gulf	
Anticura	sun stone	Los Lagos	river, village	
Antihue	sunny place	Los Lagos	hamlet	
Antillanca	sun/light green quartz	Los Lagos	volcano	
Antimahuida	sun/light mountain	Los Lagos	village	
Antuco	sun and water	Bío-Bío	volcano	

== B ==
Placename	Meaning	Region (Chile) or Province (Argentina)	Type	Comments
Buchupureo	Big Wave	Limit between VII & VIII Regions, Chile		
Bariloche	from Furiloche: people from the other side of the mountain	Los Lagos, Río Negro	city/town, mountain pass	
Bío-Bío		Araucanía, Bío-Bío	river	
Boldo	from folo, a shrub (Peumus boldus)	La Araucanía		
Bucalemu	big forest	Valparaíso		
Butacura	big stone	Los Lagos	hamlet	

== C ==
Placename	Meaning	Region (Chile) or Province (Argentina)	Type	Comments
Caburgua	dug with a spoon	Araucanía	lake, waterfall	
Calafquén	lake like a sea	Araucanía, Los Ríos	lake	
Calbuco	blue waters	Los Lagos	channel, city/town, peninsula, volcano	
Caleufú		Neuquén	river	
Callaqui		Bío-Bío	volcano	
Calle-Calle	lot of Iridaceaes	Los Ríos	river	once called Guadalfquén
Carahue	the city that was	Araucanía	city/town	
Carelmapu	green territory	Los Lagos	headland	
Carirriñe	green chusquea coleou cane	Los Ríos, Neuquén	mountain pass, river	
Carrenleufú		Chubut	city/town	
Catirai	callyíi, to cut, and raigheii, the flower of the trees, meaning short flowers	Bío-Bío	valley	
Cau-Cau	kawkaw 'seagull'	Los Ríos	river	
Chacay	Discaria serratifolia	Atacama	valley	
Chacao	protected harbour	Los Lagos	bay, channel, village	
Chapelco	chapel (a local bush) water	Neuquén	mountain, river	
Chiguayante	"chiguay" fog "antu" sun	Bío-Bío	city	-
Chillán		Bío-Bío	city	
Chiloé	chille 'small seagull' and -we 'place'	Los Lagos	archipelago, island	
Chimbarongo	crooked head or place between fogs	O'Higgins	city/town	
Choshuenco	yellow water	Los Ríos	city/town, volcano	
Cochamó	confluence/estuary	Los Lagos	bay, river, village	
Conguillío	water with Araucaria araucana pine nuts	Araucanía	lake	
Copahue		Bío-Bío	volcano	
Colhué Huapi	red island	Chubut	lake	
Concón	place of owls	Valparaíso	city/town	
Coñaripe	way of the warrior	Los Ríos	city/town	
Cucao	Pteroptochus	Los Lagos	bay, lake, river	
Curarrehue		Araucanía	city/town	
Curicó	kurü 'black' and ko 'water'	Maule	city/town	
Curimón	kurü 'black' and man (abbreviation of mañke) 'black condor'	Valparaíso	town, village	
Curiñanco	kurü 'black' and ñamko 'red-backed hawk'	Los Ríos	beach, village	

== D ==
Placename	Meaning	Region (Chile) or Province (Argentina)	Type	Comments
Dalcahue	place of canoes	Los Lagos	city/town	
Dollinco	mussel water	Los Lagos	river	

== F ==
Placename	Meaning	Region (Chile) or Province (Argentina)	Type	Comments
Futalafquén	big lake	Chubut	lake	
Futaleufú	big river	Chubut, Los Lagos	river	
Futrono	from Futronhue: place of smoke	Los Ríos	town/city	

== G ==
Placename	Meaning	Region (Chile) or Province (Argentina)	Type	Comments
Guafo	from Wafün: tusk	Los Lagos	island	

== H ==
Placename	Meaning	Region (Chile) or Province (Argentina)	Type	Comments
Hornopirén	snow oven	Los Lagos	village, volcano	once called Quechucaví; five districts
Huahum		Los Ríos, Neuquén	mountain pass, river	
Huapi	island	Los Ríos	island	
Huechuraba	clay birthplace	Santiago	commune/city	
Huerquehue	place of messengers	Araucanía	mountains	
Huilo-Huilo		Los Ríos	waterfall	
Huilquilemu	bosque de zorzales (thrush wood)	Maule Region	villa cultural, declarada Monumento Histórico en 1986	

== L ==
Placename	Meaning	Region (Chile) or Province (Argentina)	Type	Comments
Lácar	place of landslides	Neuquén	lake	
Lebu	river	Bío-Bío	city	
Licán Ray	rock flower	Araucanía	city/town	
Limay	clear/clean	Neuquén, Río Negro	river	
Liquiñe		Los Ríos	town, river, hot springs	
Llaima	blood veins	Araucanía	volcano	
Llanquihue	hidden place	Los Lagos, Los Ríos	city/town, lake, river	
Lolol	land of crabs and holes	O'Higgins	commune/town	
Loncoche	head of an important person	Araucanía	city/town	
Loncomilla	gold of the lonco	Maule	river	
Lonquimay	summit	Araucanía	city/town, volcano	

== M ==
Placename	Meaning	Region (Chile) or Province (Argentina)	Type	Comments
Máfil	hugged between rivers	Los Ríos	town	
Maihue	wooden glass	Los Ríos	lake	
Maipo		Mendoza, Santiago	river, valley, volcano	
Malalcahuello	Horse Corral	Araucanía	Town	
Mamuil Malal	corral of wooden sticks	Araucanía, Neuquén	mountain pass, village	
Mapocho	river of the Mapuche	Santiago	river	
Maule	river of tears	Maule Region	region, river, commune, valley	The river marked the southern boundary of the Inca empire; the region is now Chile’s leading wine-making region
Melipeuco		Araucanía	city/town	
Melipulli	four hills	Los Lagos	city/town	
Mulchén	people of the west	Bío-Bío	city/town, river	

== N ==
Placename	Meaning	Region (Chile) or Province (Argentina)	Type	Comments
Nahuelbuta	big puma	Araucanía, Bío-Bío	mountain range	
Nahuelhuapi	island of the puma	Neuquén, Río Negro	lake	
Nahuel Rucá	house of the puma	Buenos Aires	city/town	
Neuquén	sweep away	Neuquén, Río Negro	city/town, river	

== P ==
Placename	Meaning	Region (Chile) or Province (Argentina)	Type	Comments
Panguipulli	hill of the puma	Los Ríos	city/town, lake	
Pellaifa		Los Ríos	lake	
Peñalolén	fraternal meeting place	Santiago	city/town	
Pencahue	lugar de zapallos (place of pumpkins)	Maule Region	pueblo y comuna	
Pichilemu	little forest	O'Higgins	city/town	
Pillanleufú	river of the devil/spirit	Los Ríos	river	
Pilolcura	hollow stone	Los Ríos	beach, bay	
Pirihueico	snowy curvy water	Los Ríos	lake	
Pucón	entrance	Araucanía	city/town	
Puduhuapi	island of the pudu	Los Lagos	island	
Puelo	east	Chubut, Los Lagos	lake, river	
Pullinque		Los Ríos	lake, river	
Puyehue	place of sweet water fishes	Los Lagos, Los Ríos, Neuquén	lake, mountain pass, volcano	
Punucapa	black/fertile earth for legumes	Los Ríos	village	

== Q ==
Placename	Meaning	Region (Chile) or Province (Argentina)	Type	Comments
Quellón	from Queldon; Aristotelia chilensis	Los Lagos	city/town	
Quemchi	red/pottery earth	Los Lagos	city/town	
Quetrupillán	sleeping pillán	Araucanía, Los Ríos	volcano	
Quiapo	originally Cuyapu or Cuyamapu, meaning cuya, weasel and mapu land	Bio-Bio	hill/river	
Quilicura	three stones	Santiago	commune/city	

== R ==
Placename	Meaning	Region (Chile) or Province (Argentina)	Type	Comments
Rahue	place of gray clay	Los Lagos, Neuquén	city/town, river, village	
Rancagua	place of canes	O'Higgins	city/town	
Ranco		Los Ríos	city/town, lake	
Reloncaví	valley district	Los Lagos	estuary, sound	
Riñihue	place of Chusquea coleou	Los Ríos	city/town, lake	
Rupanco	shaked waters	Los Lagos	lake	

== T ==
Placename	Meaning	Region (Chile) or Province (Argentina)	Type	Comments
Talca	thunder	Maule	city/town	
Talcahuano	from tralcam wenu; thundering sky	Bío-Bío	city	
Temuco	from "Temu" (Blepharocalyx cruckshanksii)and "Co" water	Araucanía	city/town	
Tinguiririca	round/shining quartz	O'Higgins	city/town, river, volcano	
Tolhuaca		Araucanía	volcano	
Traful		Neuquén	lake	
Tralcan	thunder	Los Ríos	mountain	
Tromén		Neuquén	lake, volcano	
Tucapel	take by force	Bío-Bío	town	

== V ==
Placename	Meaning	Region (Chile) or Province (Argentina)	Type	Comments
Vitacura	big stone	Santiago	city/town	

== Y ==
Placename	Meaning	Region (Chile) or Province (Argentina)	Type	Comments
Yelcho	carry foam	Los Lagos	lake, river	

== See also ==
- Araucanization
- Mapuche
- Huilliche
- Picunche
- List of Muisca toponyms

== Sources ==
- Guiaverde - diccionarios (Spanish)
- Mapudungun.cl
- Francisco Solano Asta-Buruaga y Cienfuegos, Diccionario geográfico de la República de Chile (Geographic dictionary of the Republic of Chile), SEGUNDA EDICIÓN CORREGIDA Y AUMENTADA, NUEVA YORK, D. APPLETON Y COMPAÑÍA, 1899.
- DICCIONARIO MAPUCHE
- Diccionarios Ser Indigena, Lenguas Originarias de Chile
  - Español - Mapudungun
  - Mapudungun - Español
