= Chile Route 201 =

Highway in Chile

Route 201
- Ruta 201
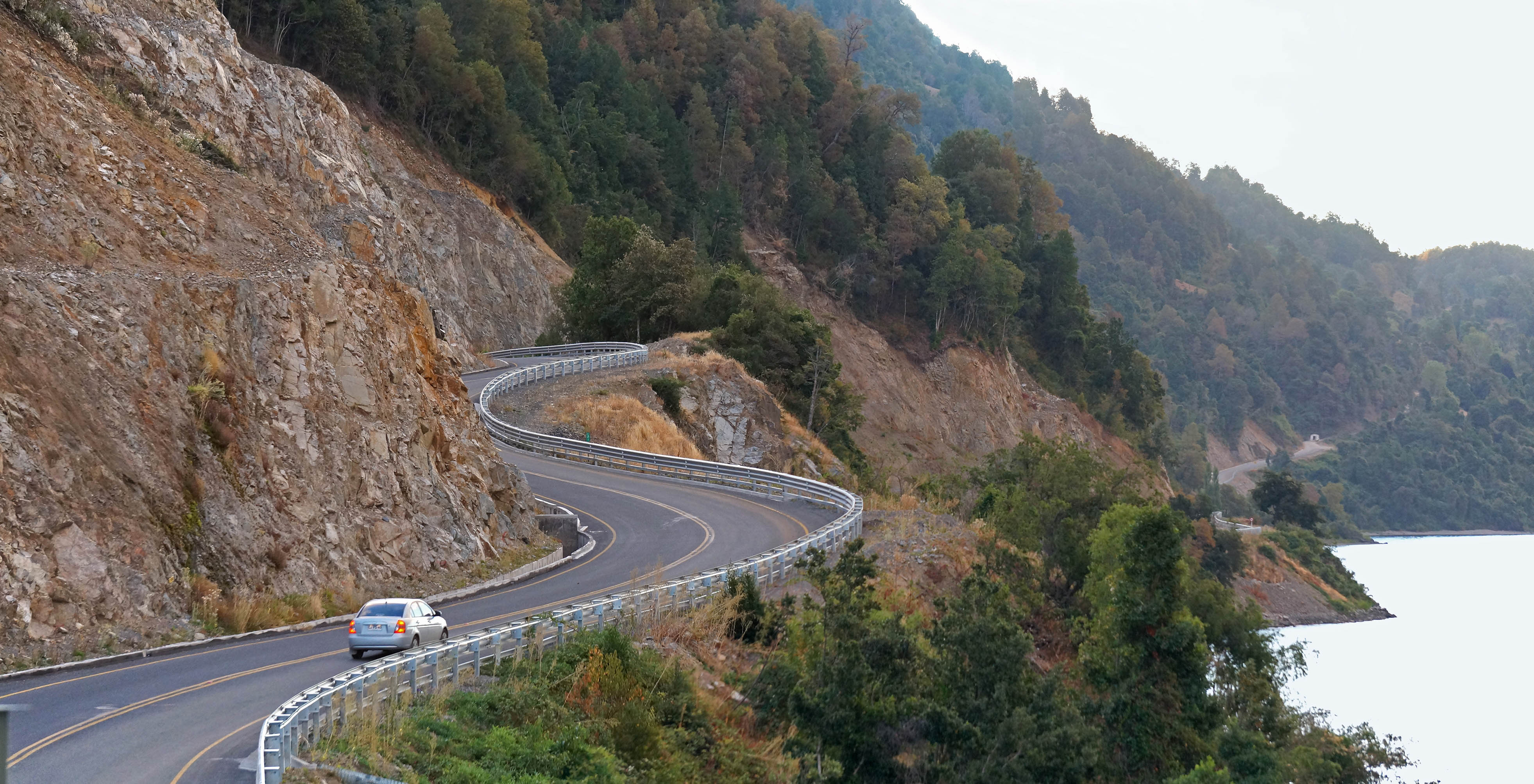
- Route 201-CH passing along the southeastern shores of Calafquén Lake.

Location
- Country: Chile

Highway system
- Highways in Chile

International Route 201-CH is a branch line road going north from Chile Route 203, about 2 km north of Panguipulli Lake to Carirriñe Pass at the border to Argentina. The road passes through parts of the southern shores of Pullinque and Calafquén lakes. It passes through the balneario town of Coñaripe at the eastern end of Calafquén Lake and the village of Liquiñe in the valley of the same name.
