= Riñihuazo =

1960 landslide in Chile

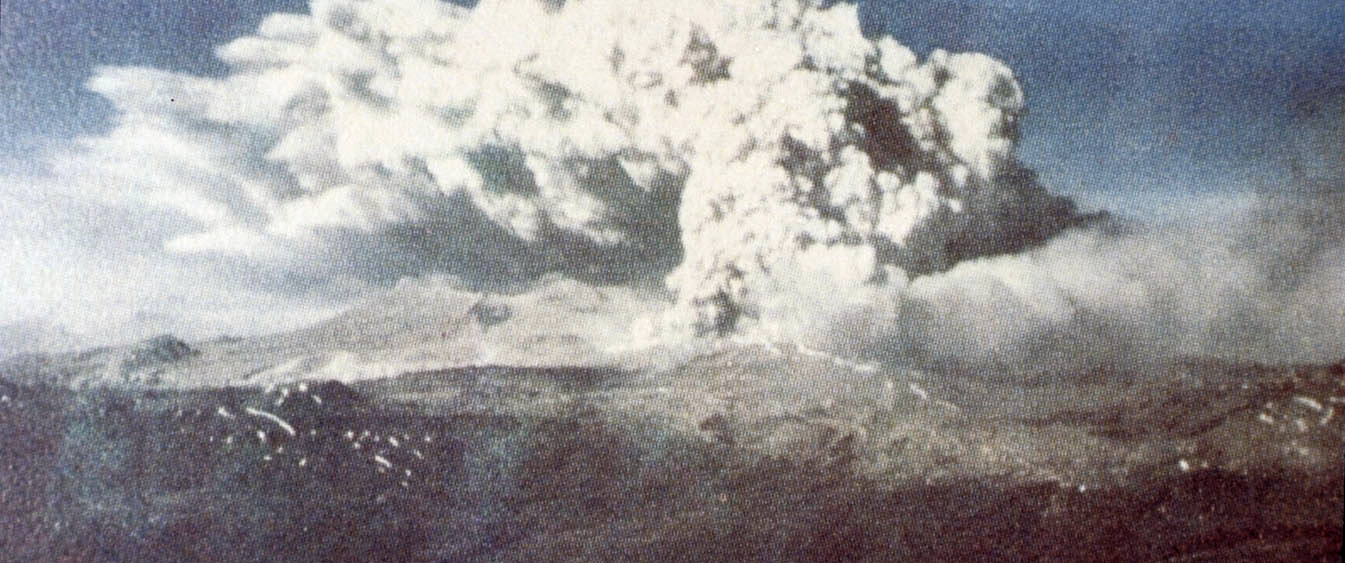
Two days after the earthquake, the Puyehue volcano, 200 km from the epicenter, erupted.

The Riñihuazo is the name given to the landslide damming of Riñihue Lake on 22 May 1960, after a landslide caused by the Great Chilean earthquake blocked its outflow. According to the chronicler Mariño de Lobera a similar event occurred after the 1575 Valdivia earthquake.

During the Great Chilean earthquake, several landslides near Tralcán Mountain blocked the outflow of Riñihue Lake at (39°46′43″S 72°27′03″W). Riñihue Lake is the lowest of the Seven Lakes chain and receives a constant inflow from the Enco River. The blocked San Pedro River, which drains the lake, passes through several towns and the city of Valdivia before finally reaching Corral Bay.

Because the San Pedro River was blocked, the water level of Riñihue Lake started to rise quickly. Each meter the water level rose was equivalent to 20 million cubic meters, which meant that 4.8 cubic kilometers of water would release into the San Pedro River (easily overpowering its flow capacity of 400 cubic meters per second) if it rose above the first, 26-meter-high dam. This potential disaster would have destroyed all the settlements along the course of the river in less than five hours, and would have had more dire consequences if the dam had suddenly broken.

The Chilean Army moved the Batallón Escuela de Suboficiales of San Bernardo south, a unit made mostly of young conscripts, south to Valdivia Province to aid in the relief efforts. Men of this battalion added to forces digging out the ditches west of Riñihue Lake. It became known as "Batallón de Hierro" (Iron Battalion) by grateful locals.

About 100,000 people lived in the affected zone. Plans were made to evacuate Valdivia, and many people left. To avoid the destruction of the city, several military units and hundreds of workers from ENDESA, CORFO, and MOP started an effort, called the Riñihuazo, to control the lake. Twenty-seven bulldozers were put into service, but they had severe difficulties moving in the mud near the dams, so dykes had to be constructed with shovels. A proposal by some US military to blow up the dams with missiles from a helicopter was rejected. The work was not restricted to the lake; drainages from other parts of the Seven Lakes were also dammed to minimize the flow into Riñihue Lake. These dams were removed later, with the exception of Calafquén Lake, which still retains its dam.

By 23 May, the main dam had been lowered from 24 to 15 meters, allowing 3 cubic kilometers of water to leave the lake gradually, but still with considerable destructive power. The settlements of Los Lagos, Antilhue, Pishuinco and the riverside areas of Valdivia were partially flooded. The team led by engineer Raúl Sáez finished two months after beginning the works.
