= Enco River =

Coordinates: 39°52′34″S 72°08′26″W

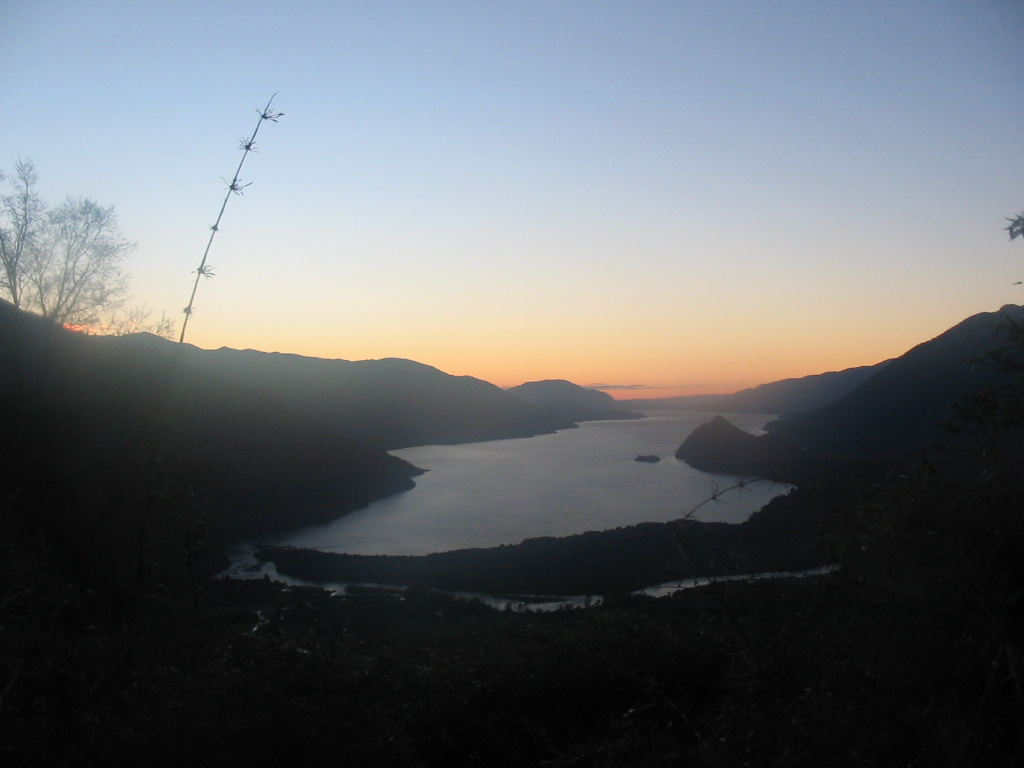
- View of the mouth of the river in Riñihue Lake
- Native name: Río Enco (Spanish)

Location
- Country: Chile

Physical characteristics
- Source
  - location: Panguipulli Lake
  - elevation: around 131 m (430 ft)
- Mouth
  - location: Riñihue Lake
  - elevation: around 105 m (344 ft)
- Length: 11.5 km (7.1 mi)

The Enco River (Spanish: Río Enco) is a river in Panguipulli commune in southern Chile. Flowing from Panguipulli Lake to Riñihue Lake, it carries the water of the six upper lakes of the Seven Lakes area into Riñihue, the last lake in the chain. Located between the piedmont of Mocho-Choshuenco Volcano and Cerro Maltusado Enco River is unusual because it drains Panguipulli Lake through its eastern and mountainous end rather than allowing the lake to drain through the low moraine hills in the west.

The Enco flows for nearly eight miles from Panguipulli Lake to Riñihue Lake. This course of the river is made spectacular by the presence, in the east, of the magnificent volcano Volcan Mocho. This combination of scenic landscape, clear water and considerably safe waters have made the Enco a magnet for rafters and other white water aficionados.

The river has strong currents and no traffic.

== See also ==
- List of rivers of Chile
