= Pullinque Hydroelectric Plant =

Hydroelectric plant in Los Ríos, Chile

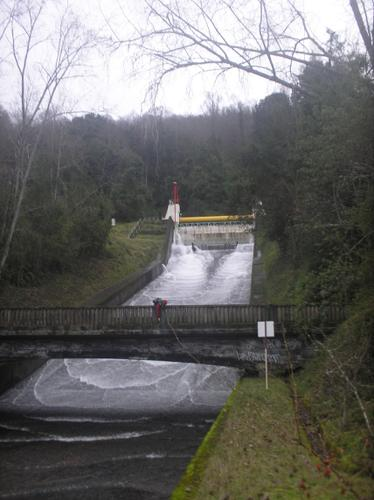
View of the plant from the way between Panguipulli and Coñaripe

Pullinque Hydroelectric Plant is a hydroelectric power station in Los Ríos Region, Chile. The plant uses water from Pullinque Lake and produces 48.6 megawatts (65,200 hp) of electricity. The plant was built by ENDESA in 1962 but is currently owned by Pullinque S.A. On October 16, 2003, about 40 Mapuches occupied the plant, claiming that it was built on land stolen from them. The occupation ended with an agreement about meeting in one week to discuss the problem.
