= Llancahue River =

Coordinates: 39°35′42″S 72°00′23″W

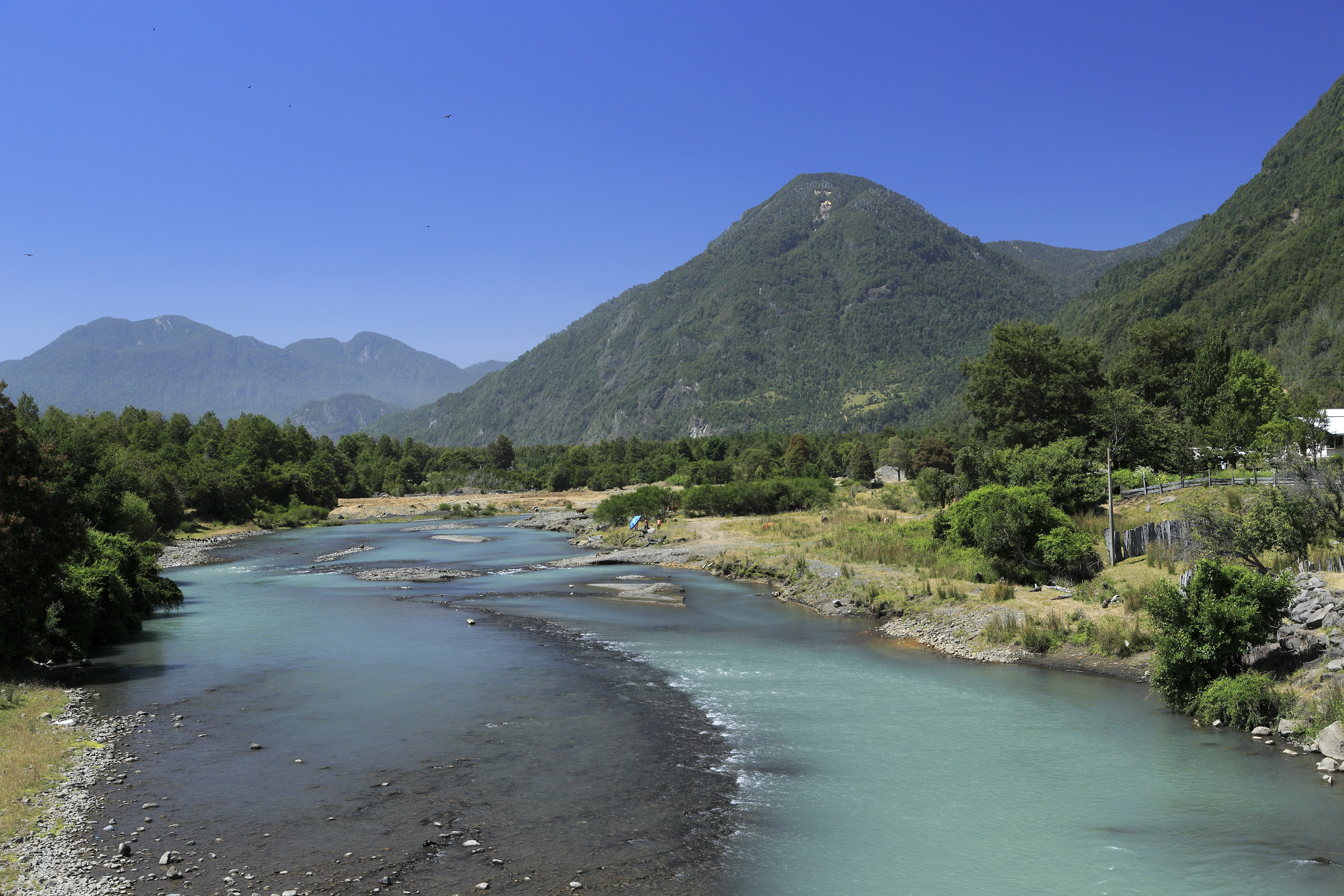
- Native name: Río Llancahue (Spanish)

Location
- Country: Chile

Physical characteristics
- Source
  - location: Pellaifa Lake
- Mouth
  - location: Calafquén Lake
  - elevation: 209 m (686 ft)

Llancahue River (Spanish: Río Llancahue) is a river in Panguipulli commune, southern Chile. It drains Pellaifa Lake and flows westward into Calafquén Lake of which it is the primary source.

== See also ==
- List of rivers of Chile
