= Choshuenco =

Village in Valdivia, Los Ríos, Chile

- Interactive map of Choshuenco
- Coordinates: 39°50′10″S 72°05′00″W
- Region: Los Ríos
- Province: Valdivia
- Municipalidad: Panguipulli
- Comuna: Panguipulli

Government
  - Type: Municipalidad
  - Alcalde: Rene Aravena
- Elevation: 148 m (485 ft)

Population (2002 census)
  - Total: 625
- Time zone: UTC−04:00 (Chilean Standard)
  - Summer (DST): UTC−03:00 (Chilean Daylight)
- Area code: Country + town = 56 + ?

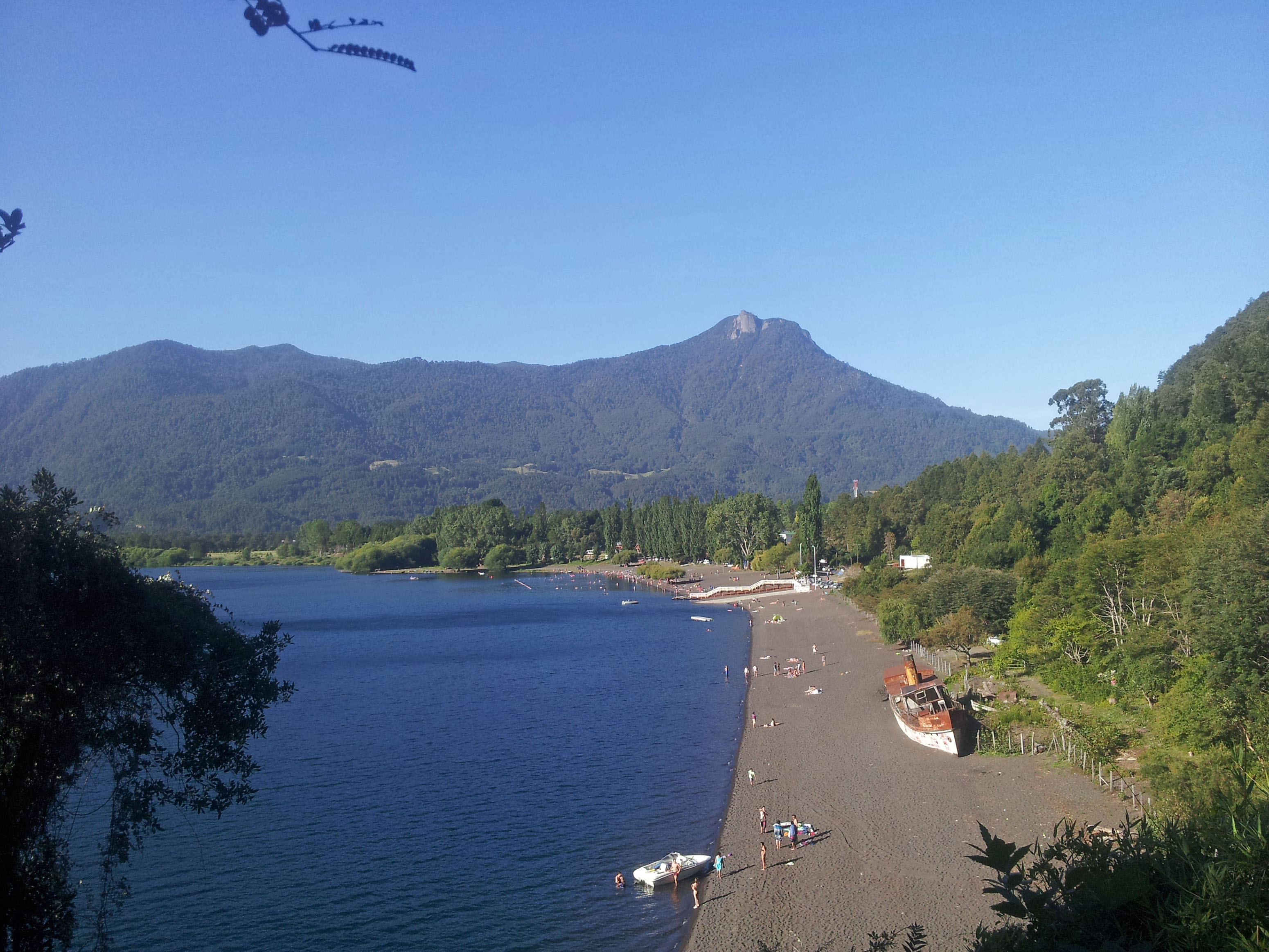

Choshuenco is a village (Spanish: aldea) on the eastern edge of Panguipulli Lake in Panguipulli commune, Los Lagos Region, Chile. It is 4 kilometres (2.5 mi) south of the 203-CH route that goes from Lanco to Huahum Pass. It is 33 kilometres (21 mi) west of the Argentina border.

Choshuenco is served by Molco Airport.
