= Quetrupillán =

Mountain in Chile

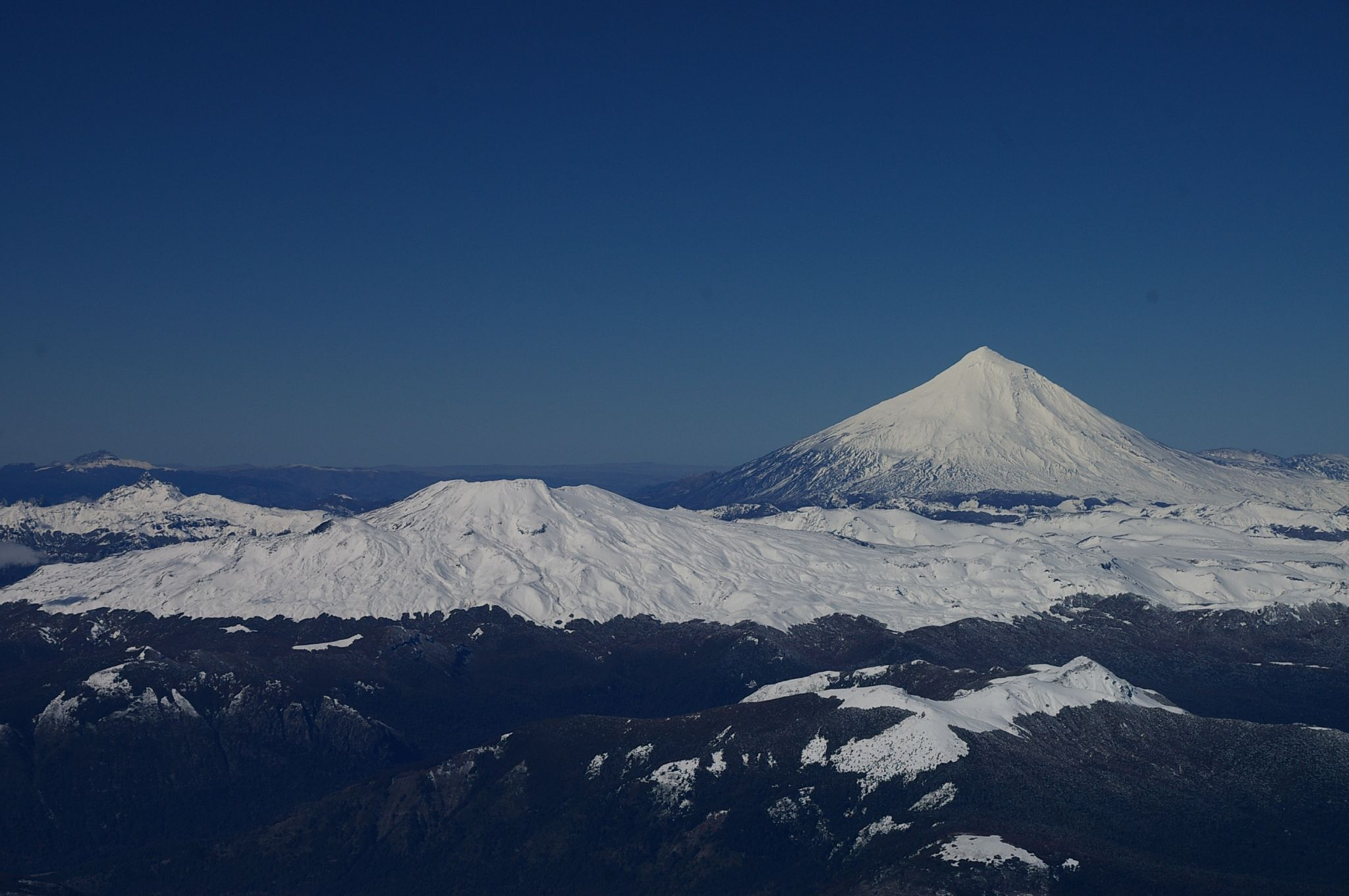
- Quetrupillán with Lanín in the background

Highest point
- Elevation: 2,360 m (7,740 ft)
- Coordinates: 39.5°S 71.7°W

Geography
- Location: Chile
- Parent range: Andes

Geology
- Rock age: Pleistocene-Holocene
- Mountain type: Stratovolcano
- Volcanic zone: South Volcanic Zone
- Last eruption: June 1872

Climbing
- Easiest route: Palguín - Laguna Azul

Quetrupillán ("blunted", "mutilated"; also known as Ketropillán; the name is sometimes applied to the neighbouring Lanín volcano.) is a stratovolcano located in Los Ríos Region of Chile. It is situated between Villarrica and Lanín volcanoes, within Villarrica National Park. Geologically, Quetrupillán is located in a tectonic basement block between the main traces of Liquiñe-Ofqui Fault (to the west) and Reigolil-Pirihueico Fault (to the east).

The volcano consists of one stratovolcano with a summit caldera, and is constructed within a field of smaller centres and a larger caldera. It was active during the late Pleistocene; some large eruptions occurred during the Holocene as well.

== Geology and geography ==
The volcano is situated in the Curarrehue, Pucón and Panguipulli municipalities of the Cautín and Valdivia provinces. Towns close to Quetrupillán are Catripulli, Currarehue and Puesco. It is considered Chile's 21st most dangerous volcano. The volcano and its neighbours form part of the Kütralkura geopark and are an important tourism destination.

=== Regional ===
Off the western coast of South America, the Nazca Plate subducts beneath the South American Plate in the Peru-Chile Trench. As the plate subducts, it releases water into the overlying mantle and causes it to melt, gives rise to the Southern Volcanic Zone of the Andes. The rate and geometry of subduction has varied over time. During the last six million years, the subduction process has been oblique and as a consequence, the Liquiñe-Ofqui Fault has developed within the volcanic arc and dominates the regional tectonics.

Quetrupillán lies on the border between Los Ríos Region and Araucanía Region, in the Southern Volcanic Zone. Together with Villarrica and Lanín it forms a northwest-southeast alignment of volcanoes, which coincides with the Mocha-Villarrica transcurrent fault. The Cordillera El Mocho and Quinquilil volcanoes are likewise situated on this alignment, both are deeply eroded composite volcanoes of small dimensions. Other volcanoes in the Southern Volcanic Zone have similar alignments, such as Nevados de Chillán and Puyehue-Cordón Caulle. In comparison to Villarrica, Quetrupillán has been less active and its eruptions were also smaller than Villarrica's, with no large pyroclastic flows found at Quetrupillán.

=== Local ===
Quetrupillán in April 2018

Quetrupillán is a 2,360 metres (7,740 ft) high composite stratovolcano and a shrinking glacier cover; the existence of calderas is unconfirmed. The entire edifice has a north-south elongated shape and covers a ground surface of 107 square kilometres (41 sq mi). The volcano contains a field of lava domes, maars and pyroclastic cones that occupy a surface of 400 square kilometres (150 sq mi). These subsidiary vents include the scoria cone Huililco, the Volcanes de Llancahue and the Volcanoes de Reyehueico. There are in total 16 lateral vents, of which 12 are found in a volcanic field south of Quetrupillán. Fissure vents of Pleistocene-Holocene age occur on the southern side of the volcano. The small volume of the main Quetrupillán edifice and the widespread vents may reflect the interaction between the volcano and the Liquiñe-Ofqui fault, which generated secondary vents whose location was controlled by the Liquiñe-Ofqui fault, the Mocha-Villarrica fault and local structures. There are two lakes on the southern flank, Laguna Azul to the southwest and Laguna Blanca to the southeast.

A number of eruption products show traces of ice-lava interactions. Tuff rings and maars formed through the interaction of magma with groundwater. A geomagnetic anomaly at shallow depth south of the volcano may be a pluton associated with a resurgent dome. Huililco scoria cone has produced two lava flows and is considered to be also part of the Quetrupillán volcanic complex.

Three different formations make up the basement of Quetrupillán: The Triassic Panguipulli, the possibly Cretaceous Currarehue and the Miocene Trápatrapa formations and plutonic rocks. These are plutonic and volcaniclastic rock units. The Villarrica-Quetrupillán volcanic chain forms a geological boundary, since the Patagonian Batholith crops out south of it. Magnetotelluric investigation of the area has found evidence of a possible deep-seated magma reservoir.

=== Composition ===
Volcanic rocks at Quetrupillán have a bimodal composition, ranging from basalt to andesite with trachyte the main component, and overall more silicic than the rocks erupted by Villarrica and Lanín. Unusually for the region, trachydacite also occurs at the volcano. These contain phenocrysts of plagioclase and pyroxene, with additional microphenocrysts of ilmenite and magnetite.

Based on the composition, it has been inferred that the magma reservoir of Quetrupillán contained a mush of crystals, from which magma was repeatedly mobilized following the injection of fresh magmas that reheated the mush. Fractional crystallization of basalts generated trachytic melts. A tectonic regime associated with the Liquiñe-Ofqui Fault which prevents magma from simply ascending to the surface may help the magma evolution processes.

== Eruptive history ==
Eruptive activity at Quetrupillán commenced before the ice ages. The first phase of activity involved the formation of calderas and stratovolcanoes; later during the ice ages lava flows and ignimbrites were emplaced. Finally, the present stratovolcano was emplaced towards the end of glaciation; parasitic vents formed even later and produced lava flows.

Quetrupillán has erupted pyroclastics, which have formed flow and pumice deposits east of the volcano. Several phases of volcanic activity have been inferred from the deposits; most of them feature either pumiceous or scoriaceous pyroclastic flow deposits with varying contents of juvenile lapilli, lithics and ash fall deposits.

- The Moraga sequence was formed 12,720 ± 40 – 12,690 ± 40 years Before Present (BP) during one rather prolonged eruption.
- The Puala sequence was formed 10,240 ± 40 years BP.
- The Trancura sequence was formed 8,680 ± 40 years BP and has a similar composition to the Avutardas sequence.
- The Carén sequence was formed 3,800 ± 30 years BP.
- The Correntoso sequence was formed 2,930 ± 30 years BP.
- The Trancas Negras sequence was formed 2,060 ± 30 years BP.
- The Puesco sequence was formed 1,650 ± 70 years BP, during the largest known eruption of Quetrupillán. This eruption created a 25 kilometres (16 mi) high eruption column and deposited about 0.26 cubic kilometres (0.062 cu mi) of rock. A volcanic explosivity index of 4 has been assigned to this event.
- The Carén sequence was formed 1,380 ± 30 years BP, it is the youngest explosive eruption of Quetrupillán.

In addition, three tephras in neighbouring lakes dated to 16,748–16,189, 15,597–12,582 and 12,708–12,567 years Before Present may originate from Quetrupillán but they have also been attributed to Sollipulli. All these tephras are of rhyolitic to rhyodacitic composition and the eruptions that generated them have an estimated volcanic explosivity index of 3.

Reports exist of eruptions during the 19th century, one eruption was reported in 1872. Explosive activity has a recurrence interval of about 1,200 years, which given the age of the last event carries significant implications with regards to the volcanic hazard of Quetrupillán.

== Mythology ==
According to a tale from Mapuche mythology, originally there were just two volcanoes: Choshuenco and Lanín. Then the volcano Ruka Pillan (Villarrica) fought the other two volcanoes in a century-long conflict; eventually Ruka Pillan was victorious, coinciding with the beginning Spanish conquest.

== Climate and vegetation ==
Annual precipitation exceeds 1,800 millimetres (71 in), with a mean annual temperature of 7.5 °C (45.5 °F). The slopes of Quetrupillán are covered by temperate forests, with Nothofagus trees being the most important species; other trees are the tepa and the maniú hembra. As of 1961, vegetation on Quetrupillán included Araucaria araucana and Nothofagus antarctica forests, as well as puna-like vegetation.

== See also ==
- List of volcanoes in Chile
