= Calafquén =

Coordinates: 39°34′17″S 72°14′50″W

- hamlet
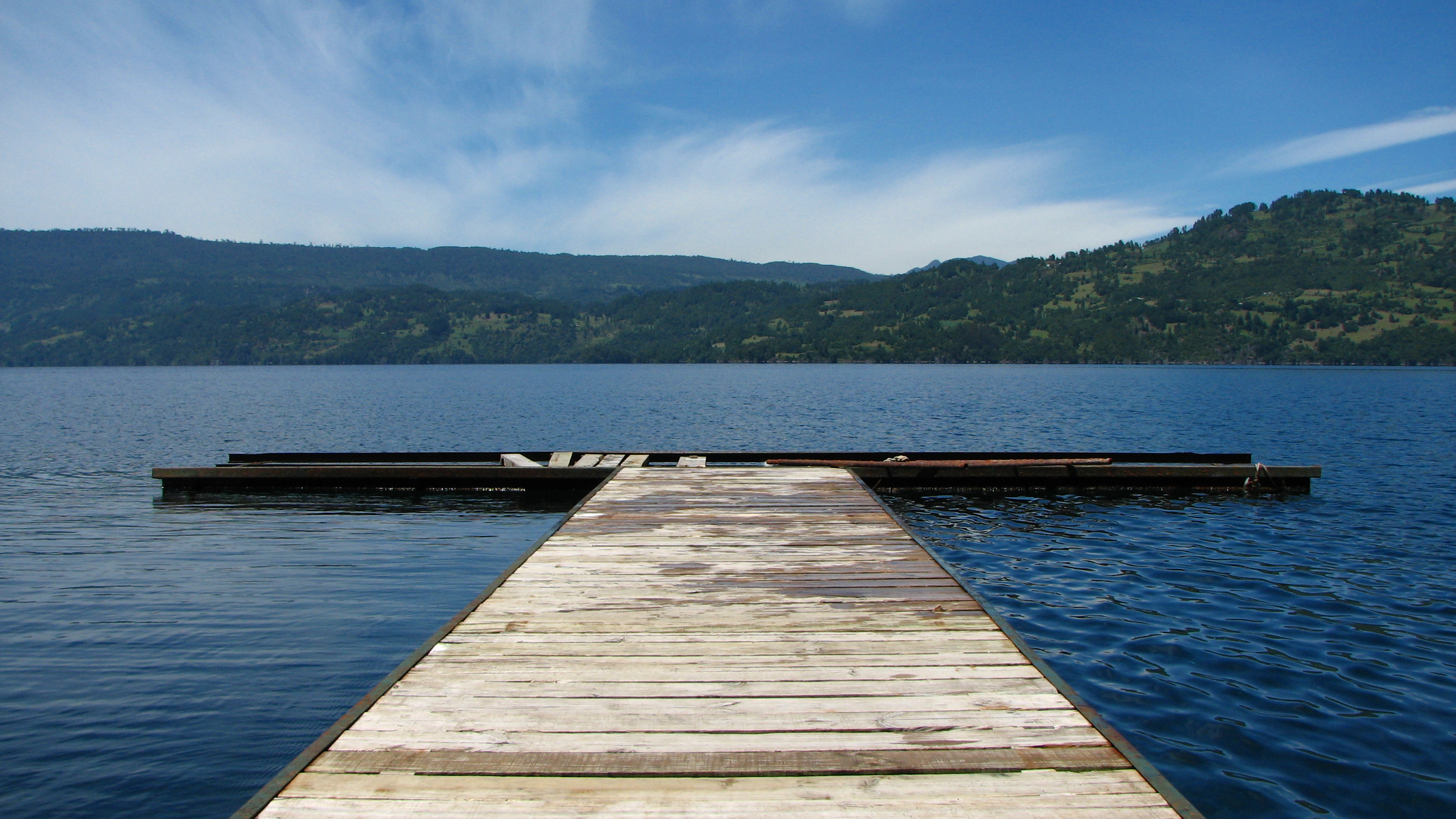
- View of Lake Calafquén
- Interactive map of Calafquén
- Region: Los Ríos
- Province: Valdivia
- Municipalidad: Panguipulli
- Comuna: Panguipulli

Government
  - Type: Municipalidad
  - Alcade: René Aravena Riffo

Population (2002 census )
  - Total: 103
- Time zone: UTC−04:00 (Chilean Standard)
  - Summer (DST): UTC−03:00 (Chilean Daylight)
- Area code: Country + town = 56 + ?

Calafquén is a Chilean hamlet (Spanish: caserío) in Panguipulli commune, of Los Ríos Region. Located on the southern shores of Calafquén Lake, Calafquén is a popular resort area during the summer months (December–February).
