= Molco Airport =

- IATA: none; ICAO: SCCM

Summary
- Airport type: Public
- Serves: Choshuenco, Chile
- Elevation AMSL: 479 ft / 146 m
- Coordinates: 39°49′28″S 72°04′55″W

Map
- Location of Molco Airport in Chile

Runways
Direction	Length		Surface
Direction	m	ft	Surface
08/26	844	2,769	Asphalt
- Source: Landings.com Google Maps GCM

Molco Airport Spanish: Aeropuerto de Molco, (ICAO: SCCM) is an airport serving Choshuenco, a small lakeside town in the Los Ríos Region of Chile.

The airport is near the mouth of the Fuy River at the eastern end of Panguipulli Lake. West approach and departures are over the water. There is mountainous terrain in all quadrants.

== See also ==
- Transport in Chile
- List of airports in Chile
