= Seven Lakes (Chile) =

Group of glacial lakes in Chile

Coordinates: 39°48′S 72°12′W

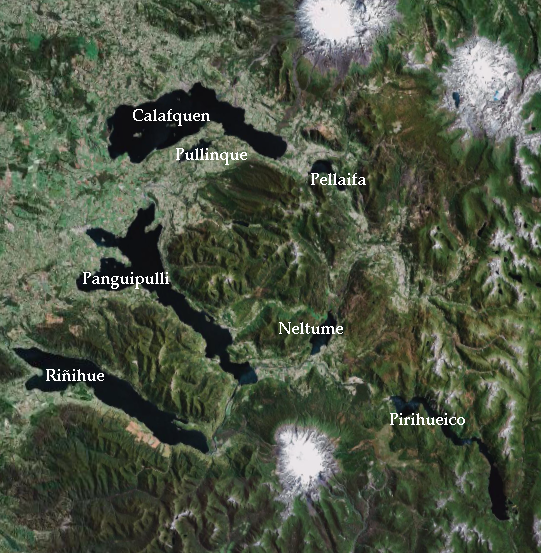
The Seven Lakes area

The Seven Lakes (Spanish: Siete Lagos) is a group of lakes which belong to the same drainage basin that starts in the Lácar Lake and ends in Corral Bay.

All the seven lakes are located at least partly within the Panguipulli commune that promotes tourism in the area. The area is surrounded by four volcanoes; Villarrica, Quetrupillán, Lanín and Mocho-Choshuenco. Due to geothermal activity there are several hot springs in the zone, including Liquiñe.

The seven lakes are:

- Panguipulli Lake
- Calafquén Lake
- Riñihue Lake
- Pirihueico Lake
- Neltume Lake
- Pellaifa Lake
- Pullinque Lake
