= Riñihue, Chile =

Coordinates: 39°49′S 72°27′W

Riñihue
- Hamlet
- Interactive map of Riñihue
- Region: Los Ríos
- Province: Valdivia
- Municipality: Los Lagos
- Commune: Los Lagos

Government
  - Type: Municipalidad
  - Alcalde: Aldo Retamal Arriagada

Population (2017)
  - Total: 92

Sex
  - Men: 47
  - Women: 45
- Time zone: UTC−04:00 (Chilean Standard)
  - Summer (DST): UTC−03:00 (Chilean Daylight)
- Area code: Country + town = 56 + 63

Riñihue (Spanish pronunciation: [riˈɲiwe]) is a hamlet (Spanish: caserío) on the shores of Riñihue Lake, Los Ríos Region, Chile. It is located south of the mountain Tralcán in the western end of Riñihue Lake. In early 20th century Riñihue grew out as a settlement due to the exploitation of wood in Riñihue Lake. Riñihue was the first Chilean lakeshore settlement to be reached by the railroad. The hamlet was flooded in 1960 during the Riñihuazo.

It had a population of 92 as 2017 down from 243 in 2002. Riñihue is served by El Vergel Airport.
