= Licán Ray =

Licán Ray Lican-Ray (Stone Flower)
- Town
- Interactive map of Licán Ray
- Coordinates: 39°29′15″S 72°09′28″W
- Country: Chile
- Region: Araucania
- Province: Cautín
- Municipalidad: Villarrica
- Commune: Villarrica

Government
  - Type: Municipality
  - Mayor: Pablo Astete

Population (2002 census)
  - Total: 7,200 (updated to 2,012)
- Time zone: UTC−04:00 (Chilean Standard)
  - Summer (DST): UTC−03:00 (Chilean Daylight)
- Area code: Country + town = 56 + ?
- Website: villarrica.org

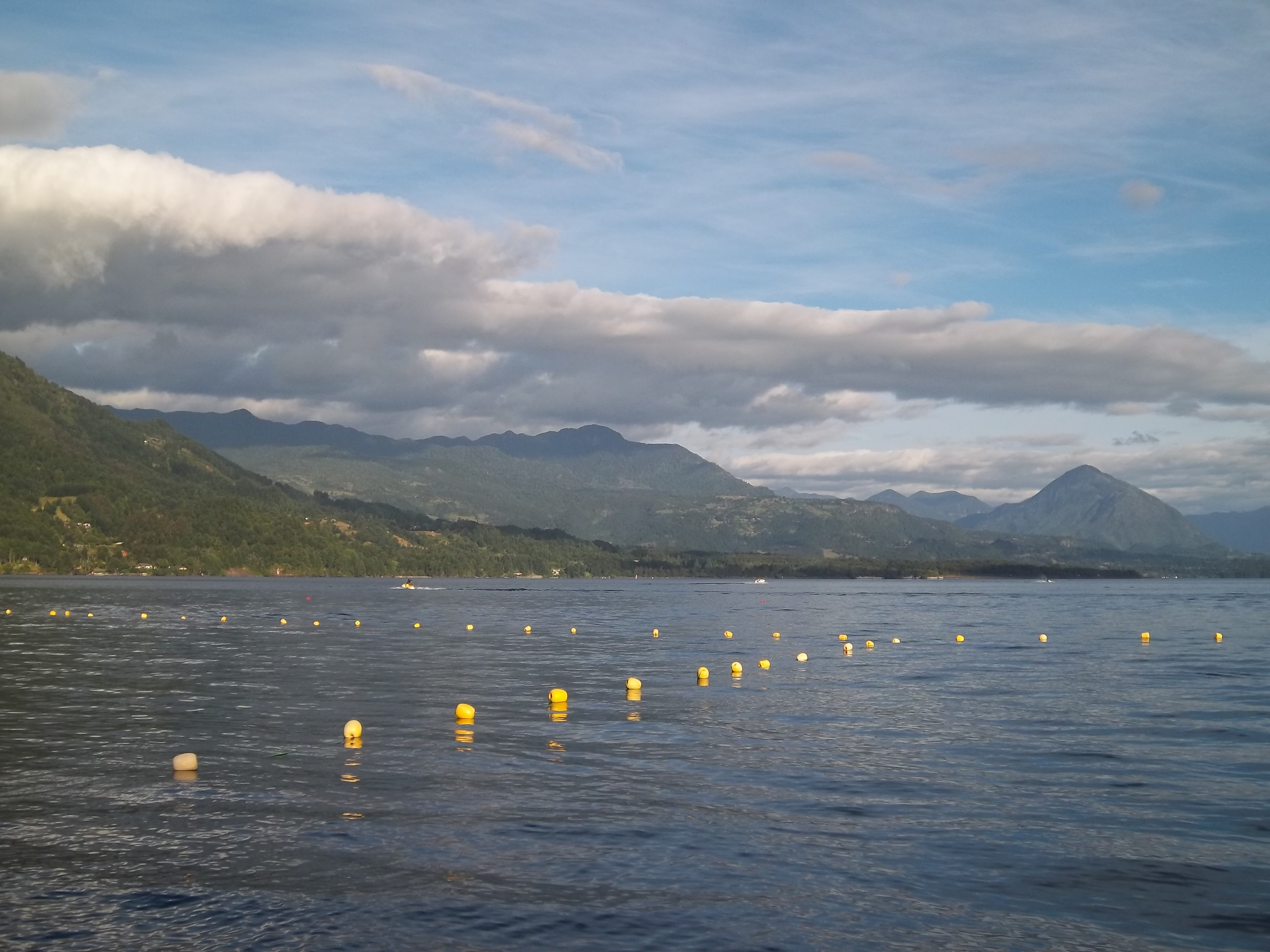
Calafquén lake from "Playa Chica" small beach of Lican Ray

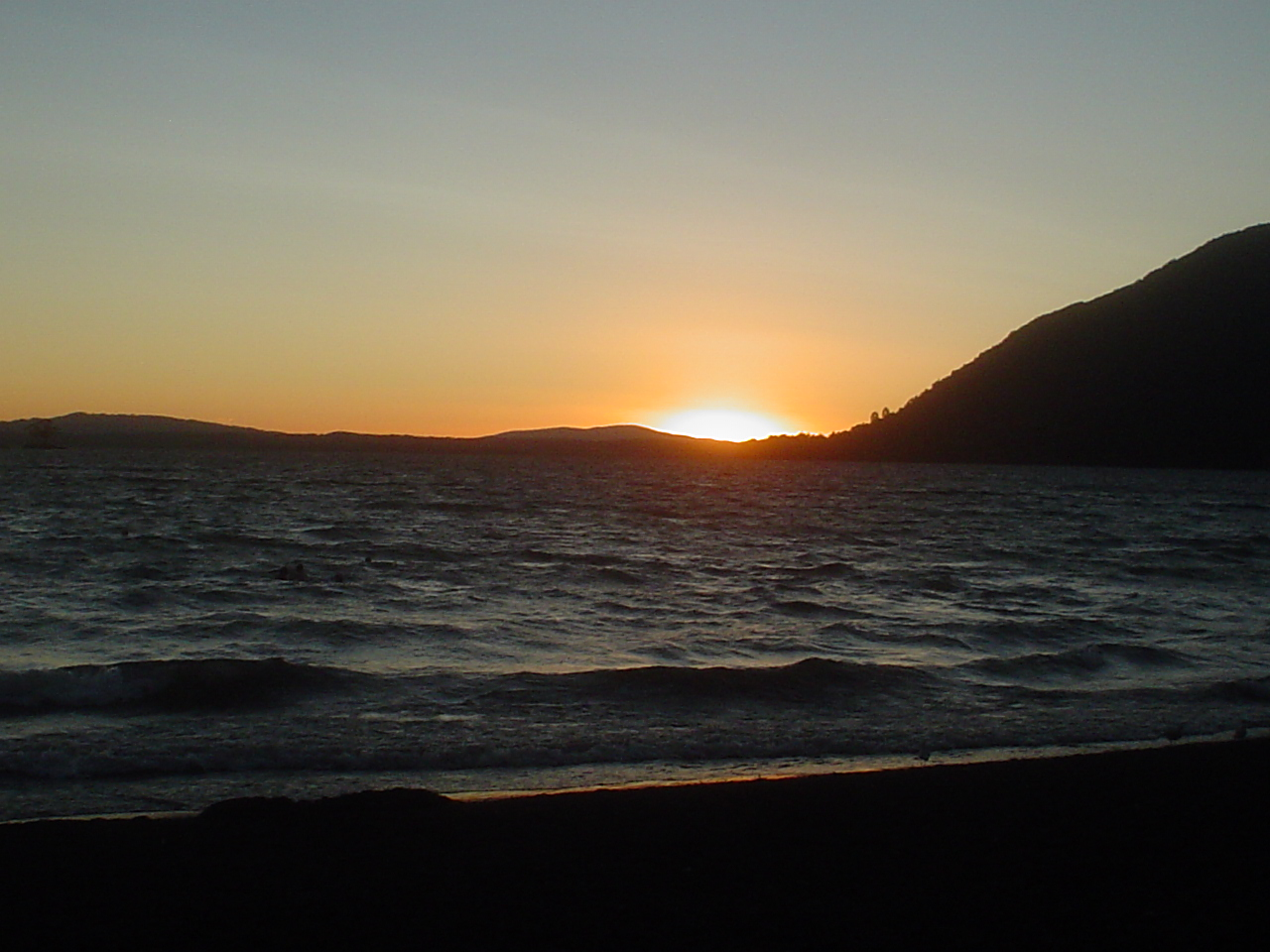
Sunset in Lican Ray

Licán Ray is a Chilean town and resort area, located on the north shore of Calafquén Lake, 27 kilometres from the town of Villarrica, within the commune of Villarrica, Cautín Province, Araucanía Region. It is a busy tourist centre with a population of 7,200 (measured in the 2002 census and updated in 2012). The town's name comes from Mapudungun, the language of Chile's indigenous Mapuche people, and means “Stone Flower”. The name can be written in different ways, such as Lican Ray, Licanray or Licán-Ray.

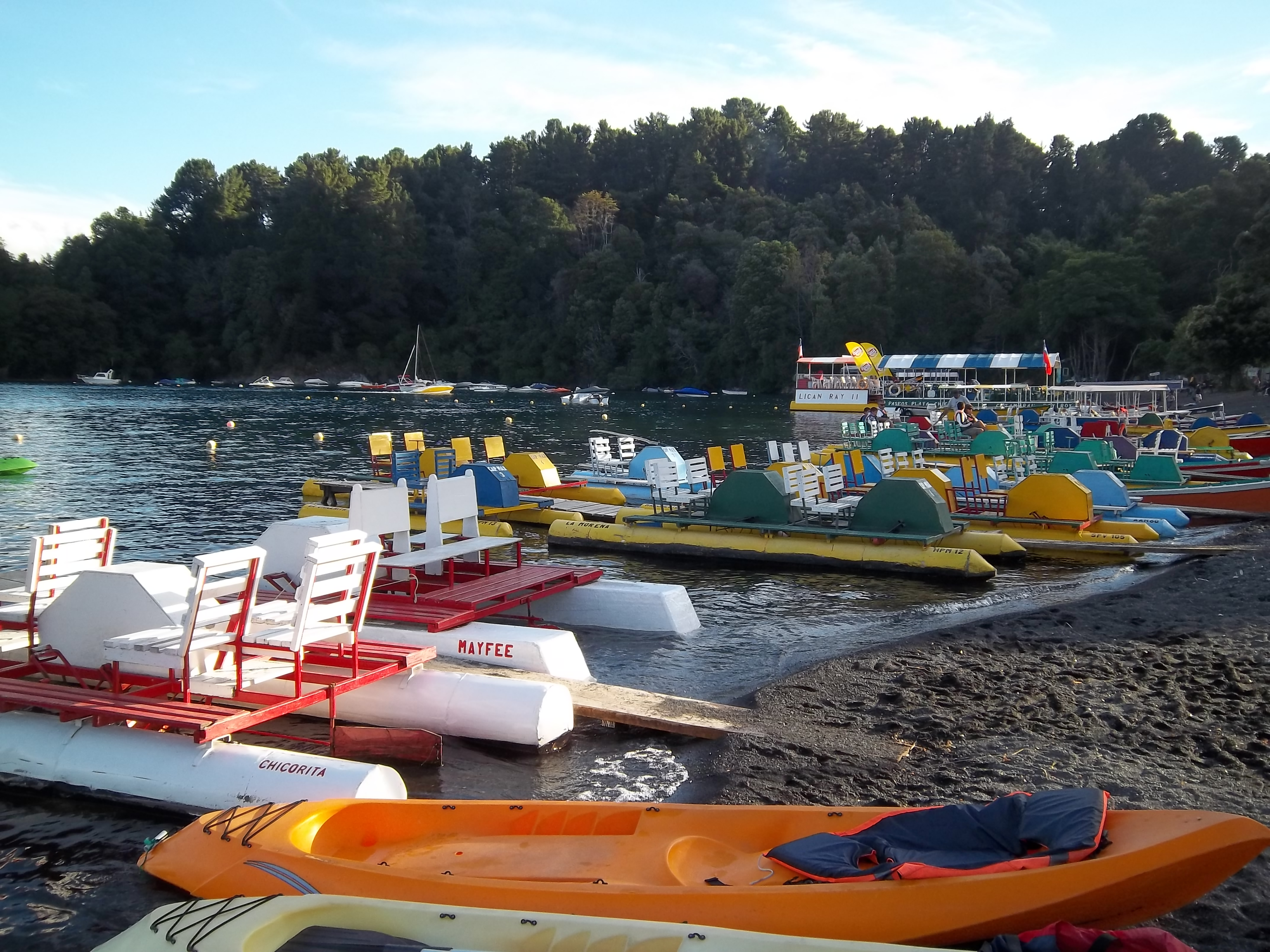
Embankment in the short beach of Lican Ray.

== History ==
Legend has it that Licán Ray, or “Stone Flower” in Mapudungun, was the name of the daughter of the powerful Cacique Carilef. Licán Ray fell in love with a Spanish sailor and the two fled from the fury of her father and community to one of the islands in the Calafquén Lake. They hid on the island for days until cold weather forced them to make a fire, which betrayed their location and forced them to escape to a more distant island. Every time they made a fire to cope with the cold, however, their persecutors found them and they had to sail to another of the 11 islands, until eventually the persecutors lost their trail. The place was then named of Licán Ray in the daughter's memory.

The town has no official foundation date, though it is popularly believed that activity began on this shore in the 1930s and it was registered in the property records of the city of Valdivia on February 15, 1944. In 1942, the government loaned some land to the State Train Company, which harvested oak wood to use as railroad ties. The activities of this company brought some life to the town, providing transportation across the lake in the ship it used to transport its products and materials. By 1948, having used up the nearby reserves of oak, the company left the town. Although a second, private company came to replace it and exploit the wood of the area, it only lasted until 1952. After this, the economy of the town decayed. Plans to build a dam almost left the town 14 metres underwater but the decision was changed after the 1960 Valdivia earthquake. Instead, the Pullinque hydropower plant was built in 1962 in Pullinque Lake. In 1966, the government sold or gave away to build houses and tourist accommodation in order to improve the local economy and develop the area. In 1990, the road that connects Villarrica with Licán Ray was finally tarmacked, giving an extra push to the local tourism industry.

== Places of interest and landmarks ==
The main attraction is the landscape of lakes, mountains, volcanoes and native forest.,

- Calafquen Lake, at 209 metres over sea level, covering an area of 120 km^{2} holding 11 islands. The long and thin lake is host for several outdoor and tourist activities, such as fishing and watersports.
- Península Natural Park, a 15.5 ha peninsula extending into the lake from the town of Licán Ray. It is maintained by the local Mapuche community and is a perfect spot to observe native woods such as Arrayán, or Chilean myrtle, and Lingue.
- Playa Grande (“large beach”), extending from the north base of the peninsula to the Malpun stream. The beach is covered in volcanic sand and is the starting point for many of the outdoor activities offered in the area.
- Playa Chica (“small beach”), extending from the south base of the peninsula to the fisherman's cove. It is a starting point for sailing activities.
- El Escorial, a petrified lava river left from the 1977 eruption of Villarrica Volcano. Today it is possible to walk along this stone river.
- The Artisan Markets, Plaza de Armas (main square) and Plaza San Francisco, all located in the town. These are popular locations for tourists to appreciate local architecture, culture and customs.
- The Promenade, located at the beginning of Playa Chica. This is lined with colourful boats, some of which can be rented by tourists to explore the lake or swim out in the waters.

== See also ==
- List of towns in Chile
