= Mocho-Choshuenco =

Mountain in Chile

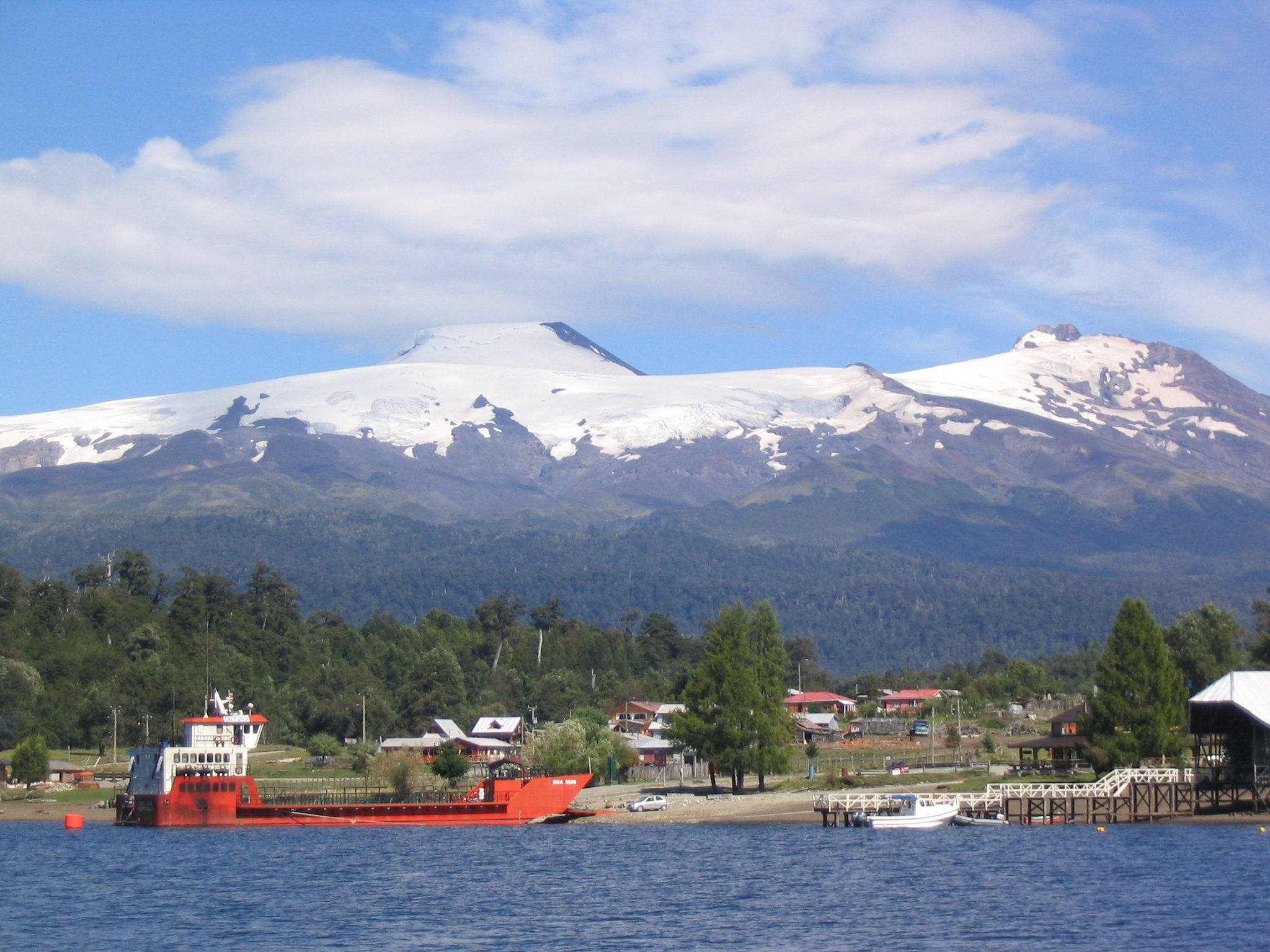
- In the left; the Mocho cone and in the right the eroded Choshuenco. Puerto Fui at Pirihueico Lake in the foreground.

Highest point
- Elevation: 2415 m (Choshuenco); 2422 m (Mocho)
- Listing: Ultra
- Coordinates: 39°54′35″S 72°2′15″W (Choshuenco)

Naming
- Language of name: Spanish for headless (Mocho) and Mapudungun for yellow waters (Choshuenco)
- Pronunciation: Spanish: [ˈmotʃo tʃosˈweŋko]

Geography
- Location: Panguipulli, Futrono and Los Lagos, Chile
- Parent range: Andes

Geology
- Mountain type: Stratovolcano
- Volcanic zone: South Volcanic Zone
- Last eruption: 1937

Climbing
- First ascent: 1934 Dr. Rudolf Haege, Kaerner and Steenbloock (Choshuenco)
- Easiest route: Choshuenco (nearest village with provisions) – Enco – Río Blanco – Tumba del Buey – Mochos peak – Choshuencos peak (in that order)

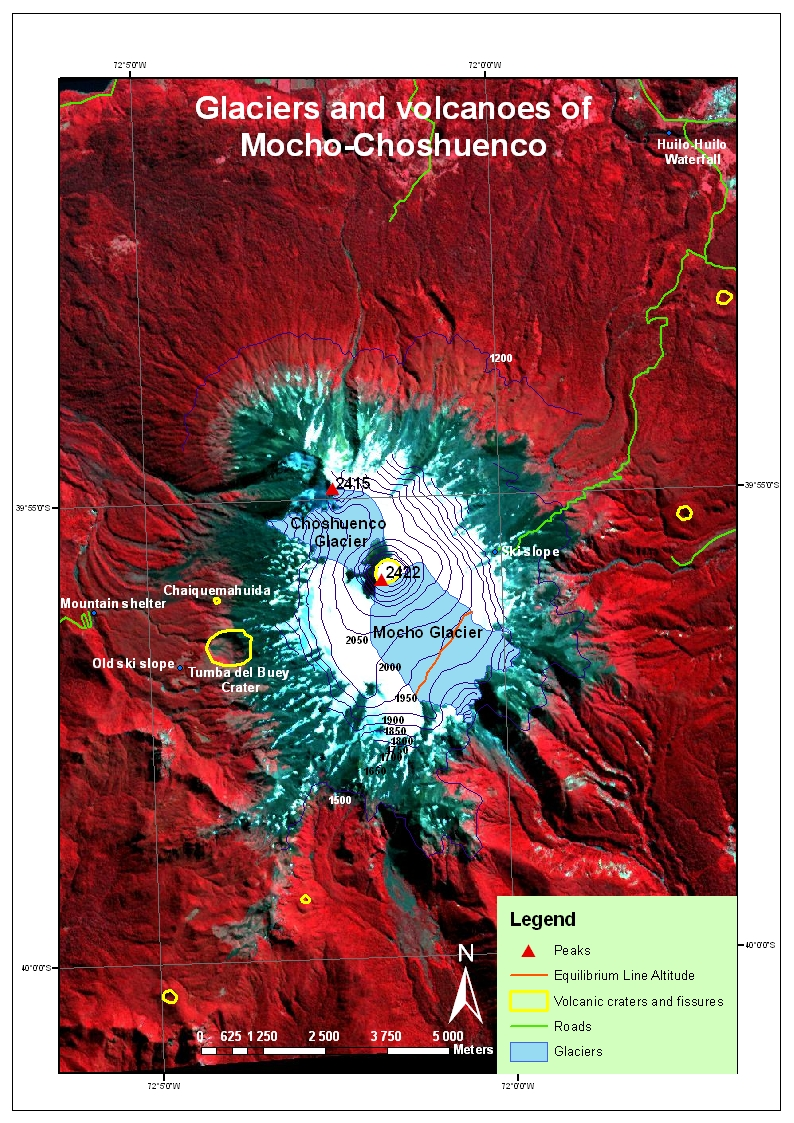
Map of Mocho-Choshuenco made from an ASTER VNIR image

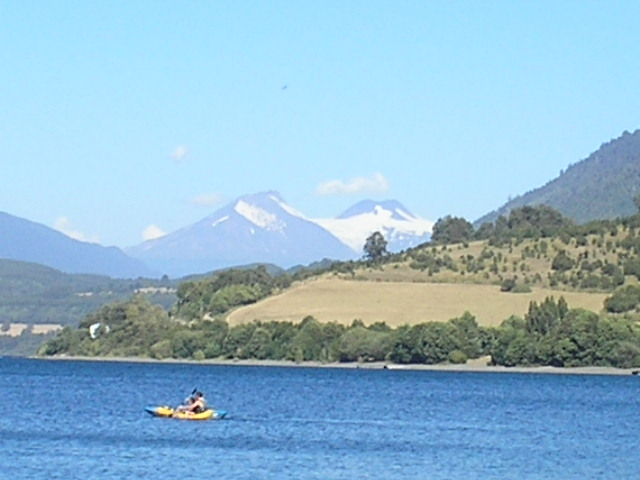
View of Mocho-Choshuenco from the camping beach of Riñihue

Mocho-Choshuenco (Pronounced: /ˈmɒtʃoʊ tʃɒsˈwɛnkoʊ/ MOTCH-oh choss-WEN-koh) is a glacier covered compound stratovolcano in the Andes of Los Ríos Region, Chile. It is made of the twin volcanoes Choshuenco in the northwest and the Mocho in the southeast. The highest parts of the volcano are part of the Mocho-Choshuenco National Reserve while the eastern slopes are partly inside the Huilo-Huilo Natural Reserve.

Choshuenco, located on the northwest rim of the 4 km wide caldera, is of late glacial age. It has a heavily eroded crater and is currently dormant. Mocho is an andesitic-dacitic volcano placed above the caldera. Some parasitic craters and cinder cones are located on the southwest and northeast flanks of the stratovolcano. Mocho has its earliest certainly recorded eruption in 1759, older eruptions reported are uncertain due to the usage of different names and inexact maps.

The northern foothills of Mocho-Choshuenco are surrounded by an arc of rivers and lakes formed by Fui, Enco and Llanquihue River, and Pirihueico, Panguipulli and Riñihue Lakes. The Fui River has high degree of underground infiltration, such that in some years the Huilo-Huilo Falls may dry out completely. As consequence of this infiltration a large aquifer is situated beneath Mocho-Choshuenco. The southern and eastern slopes drain to Pillanleufú River which flows south along the Liquiñe-Ofqui Fault to Maihue Lake.

== Name ==
The two volcanoes have had several historical names such as Valdivia, used by Juan Ignacio Molina in 1795, and Panguipulli and Lajara, which Pedro Amadeo Pissis identified in 1875, as Choshuenco and Mocho respectively because only Choshuenco is visible from Panguipulli Lake. Other historical spellings and names for the volcanoes include Choshuenco-Pillán, Rauco, Penguipulli, Reñihue and Riñihue.

The current name for the volcano is composed of the Spanish word mocho and the native Mapudungun word choshuenco (pronounced choswenko). Mocho means short cut and refers to the headless or edgeless shape of Mocho's volcanic cone. The word choshuenco may be a corruption of the chodhuen and co which means yellow earth and water respectively. Another possible etymology is chod-hue and co which would mean place where there is water to dye yellow.

== Eruptions ==
Very little is known about eruptions before the Holocene epoch. This is explained by the great extent of the Patagonian Ice Sheet that covered most of the southern Andes and caught volcanic material such as ash and pyroclast. Glaciers of the ice sheet also reworked previously deposited layers.

Some 10,300 years ago Choshuenco produced the Neltume Pumice during a plinian eruption.

The earliest historical accounts of eruptions from the Mocho-Choshuenco complex may be those in Alonso de Ovalle's map Tabula Geographica Regni Chile from 1646. Here Mocho-Choshuenco may be one of the mountains drawn as erupting volcanoes east of Valdivia. In Juan Ignacio Molina's map from 1795 Mocho-choshuenco appears erupting under the name of Volcán de Valdivia, but eruption shown in this map is probably that of 1759.

On November 1, of 1864 the Chaiquemahuida cinder cone erupted, the eruption eventually ended 1–3 days later. This explosive eruption originated from a vent on the southwestern flank of Mocho's edifice and produced pyroclastic flows. According to a missionary from Quinchilca, who was interviewed by Vidal Gormaz in 1869, a strong noise followed by an earthquake was felt during one of the first days of November 1864.

The last reported eruption, is supposed to have occurred on June 16, 1936. Little is known about this event apart from the occurrence of mudflows and lahars, this have led volcanologists to consider this eruption report as a false report just like in the case of the supposed 1906 Lanín eruption.

== Glaciers ==
The uppermost part of Mocho-Choshuenco is covered by an ice cap that surrounds the volcanic cone of Mocho and some flanks of Choshuenco. By 2003 the ice cap had shrunk in area by a total of 40% of its 28.4 km^{2} (11.0 sq mi) area of 1976. The largest retreat by area occurred on Choshuenco Glacier in the northwest. Mocho Glacier runs from Mocho's cone to the southeast and is the largest glacier of the volcano with its 5.1 km^{2} followed by Choshuenco Glacier (2 km^{2}).

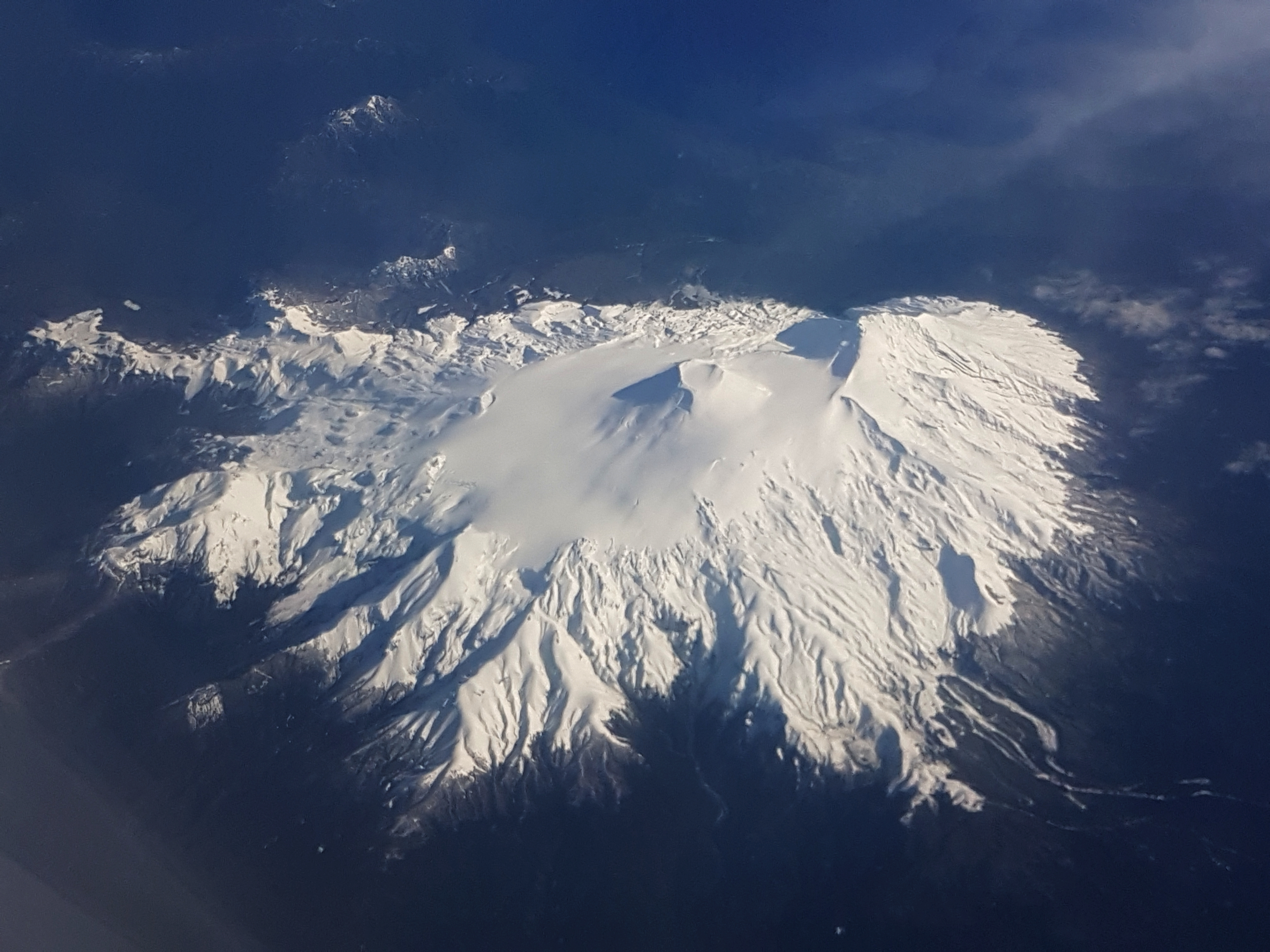
Mocho-Choshuenco volcano from the air in June 2019. View looking west. The Mocho recent cone is growing inside the older ice-filled caldera.

== See also ==
- Geology of Valdivia
- Glaciers of Chile
- List of volcanoes in Chile
