= Cerro Maltusado =

Mountain in Chile

- Location within Chile

Highest point
- Elevation: 1,537 m (5,043 ft)
- Prominence: 1,425 m (4,675 ft)
- Coordinates: 39°49′57″S 72°12′57″W

Geography
- Location: Chile
- Parent range: Andes

Geology
- Rock age: Carboniferous-Permian
- Mountain type: Arête peak

Cerro Maltusado (Spanish for badly cut mane) is the highest peak of La Peineta arête in the Andes of Los Ríos Region, Chile. The peak has an approximate prominence of about 1425 meters from its base at Riñihue Lake, being close to be an ultra prominent peak.
