= Pilolcura =

Beach and hamlet in Chile

Coordinates: 39°40′0″S 73°21′0″W

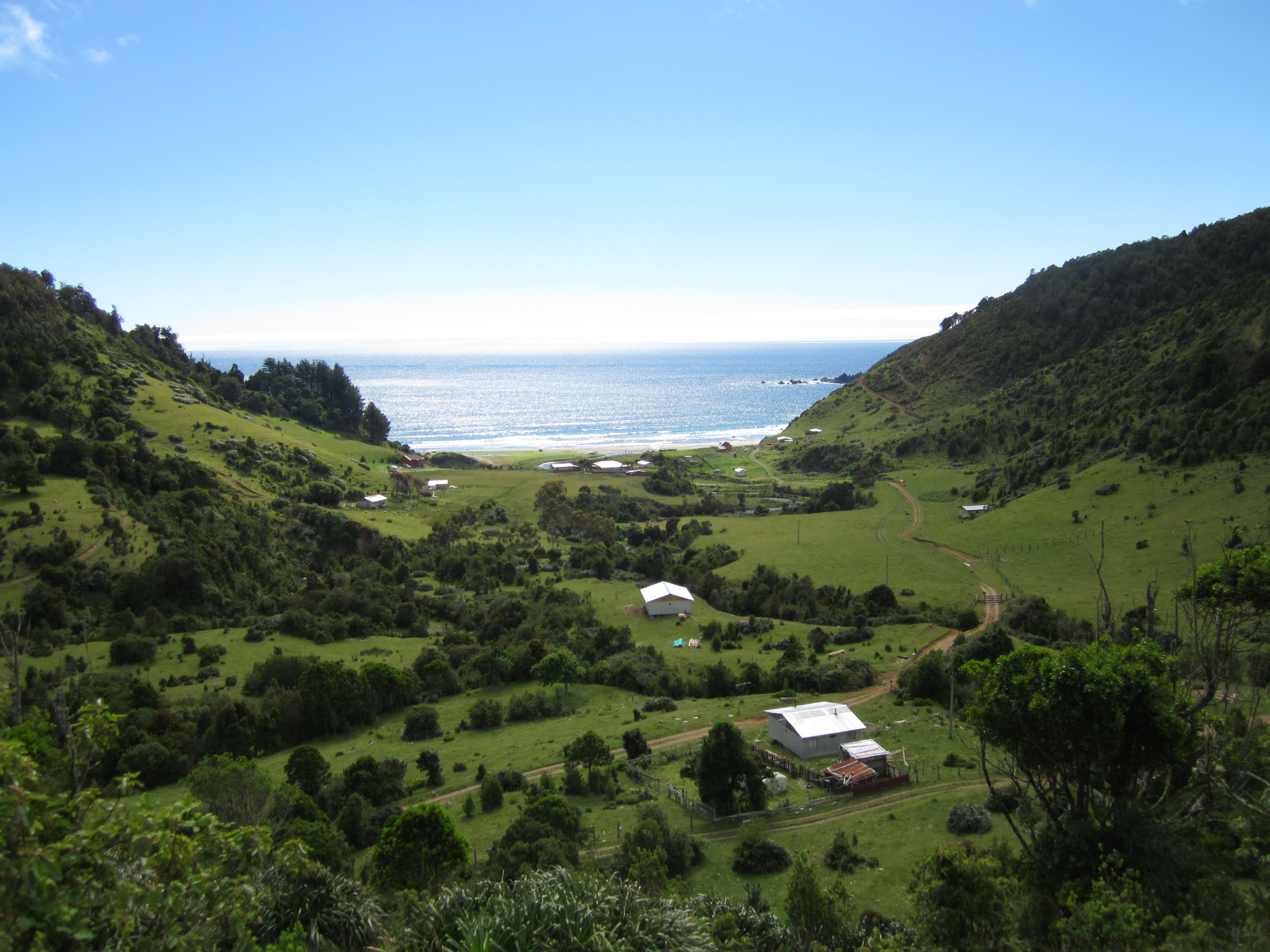
View of the hamlet of Pilolcura.

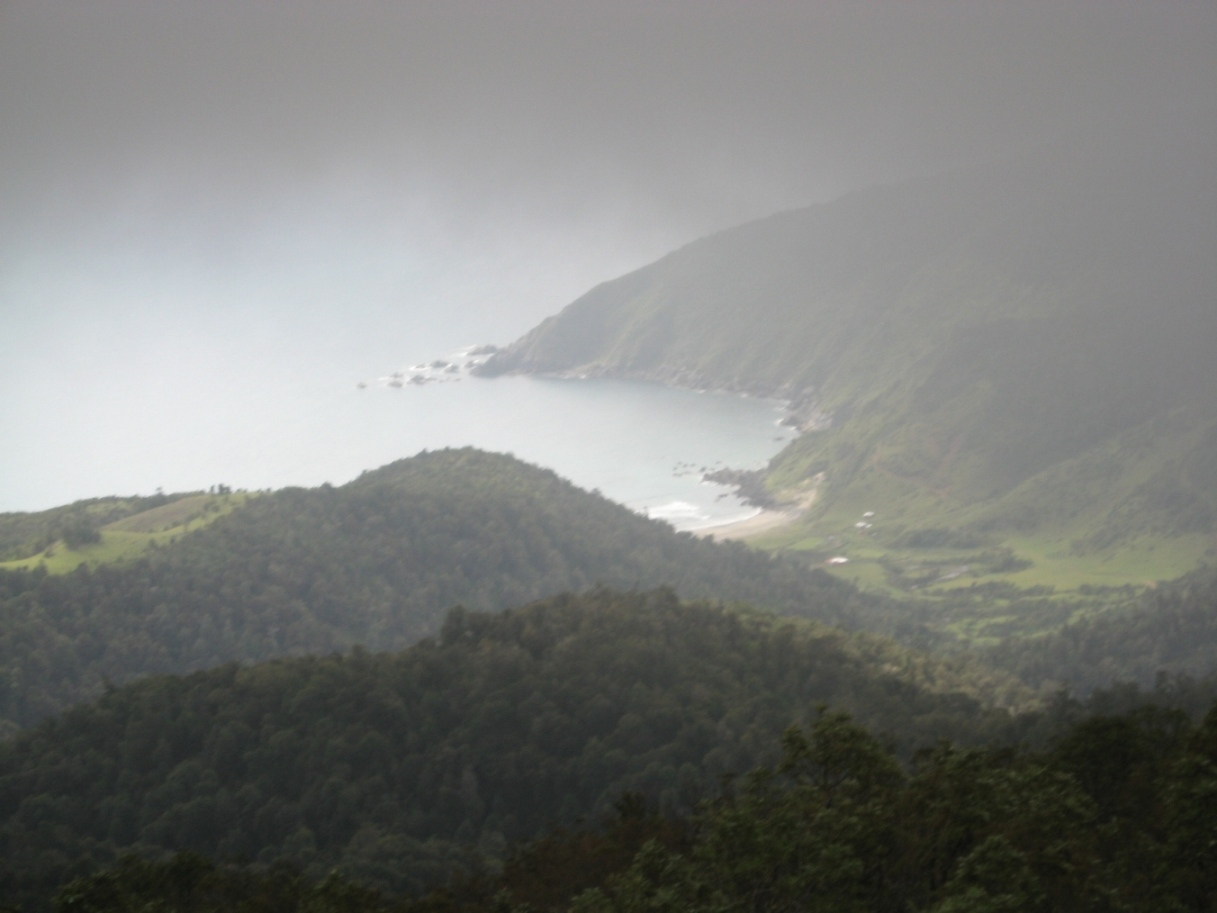
View of Pilolcura from the hills.

Pilolcura (Mapudungun for hollow stone) is a beach and hamlet in Valdivia Province, Los Ríos Region, Chile. It is named after the conglomerate formations on its beach, which resemble a stone castle with large arches.
