= Pellaifa Lake =

Lake in southern Chile

Pellaifa Lake Lago Pellaifa
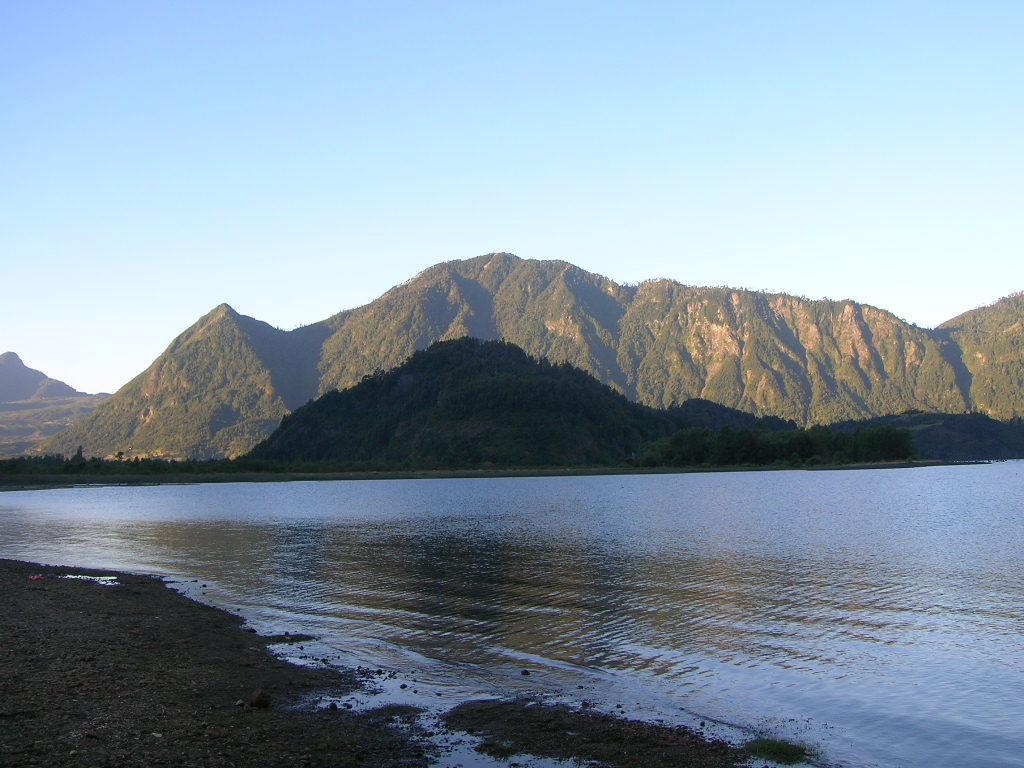

- Location within Chile
- Coordinates: 39°36′S 71°58′W
- Lake type: Glacial
- Primary outflows: Llancahue River
- Basin countries: Chile
- Surface area: 6.5 km^{2} (2.5 sq mi)
- Max. depth: 93 m (305 ft)

The Pellaifa Lake (Spanish: Lago Pellaifa) is one of the "Seven Lakes" in Panguipulli municipality, southern Chile. The lake is of glacial origin and lies in an area of hot springs.
