= Pullinque Lake =

Lake in Chile

Pullinque Lake Lago Pullinque
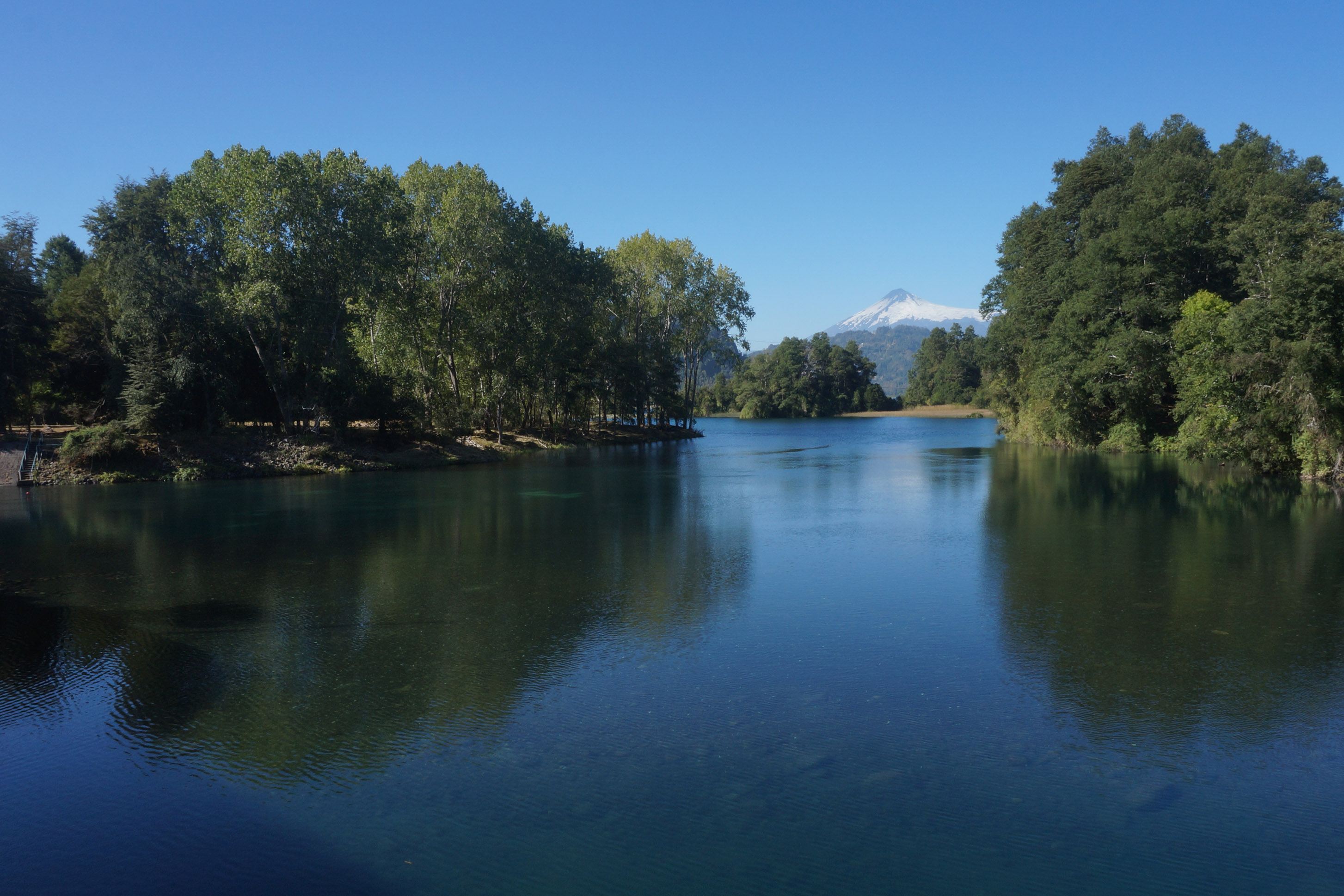
- Pullinque Lake and Villarrica Volcano as seen at Bocatoma Bridge, Región de los Ríos, Chile

- Location within Chile
- Location: Panguipulli
- Coordinates: 39.5650°S 72.1481°W
- Type: Glacial
- Primary inflows: Pullinque River
- Primary outflows: Guanehue River
- Basin countries: Chile

The Pullinque Lake (Spanish: Lago Pullinque) is one of the "Seven Lakes" in the Panguipulli municipality, southern Chile. The lake is of glacial origin and lies between Calafquén and Panguipulli Lake. Pullinque Hydroelectric Plant is located near the southwestern outflow of the lake.
