= El Vergel Airport =

- IATA: none; ICAO: SCVG

Summary
- Airport type: Public
- Serves: Riñihue, Chile
- Elevation AMSL: 820 ft / 250 m
- Coordinates: 39°49′47″S 72°29′10″W

Map
- Location of El Vergel Airport in Chile

Runways
Direction	Length		Surface
Direction	m	ft	Surface
07/25	660	2,165	Grass
- Source: Landings.com Google Maps GCM

El Vergel Airport (Spanish: Aeropuerto El Vergel, (ICAO: SCVG)) is an airport 3.5 kilometres (2.2 mi) west of Riñihue, a lakeside village in the Los Ríos Region of Chile.

The Tralcán mountain is 1 kilometre (0.62 mi) north of the runway.

== See also ==
- Transport in Chile
- List of airports in Chile
