= Moraine-dammed lake =

Type of lake formed by glaciation

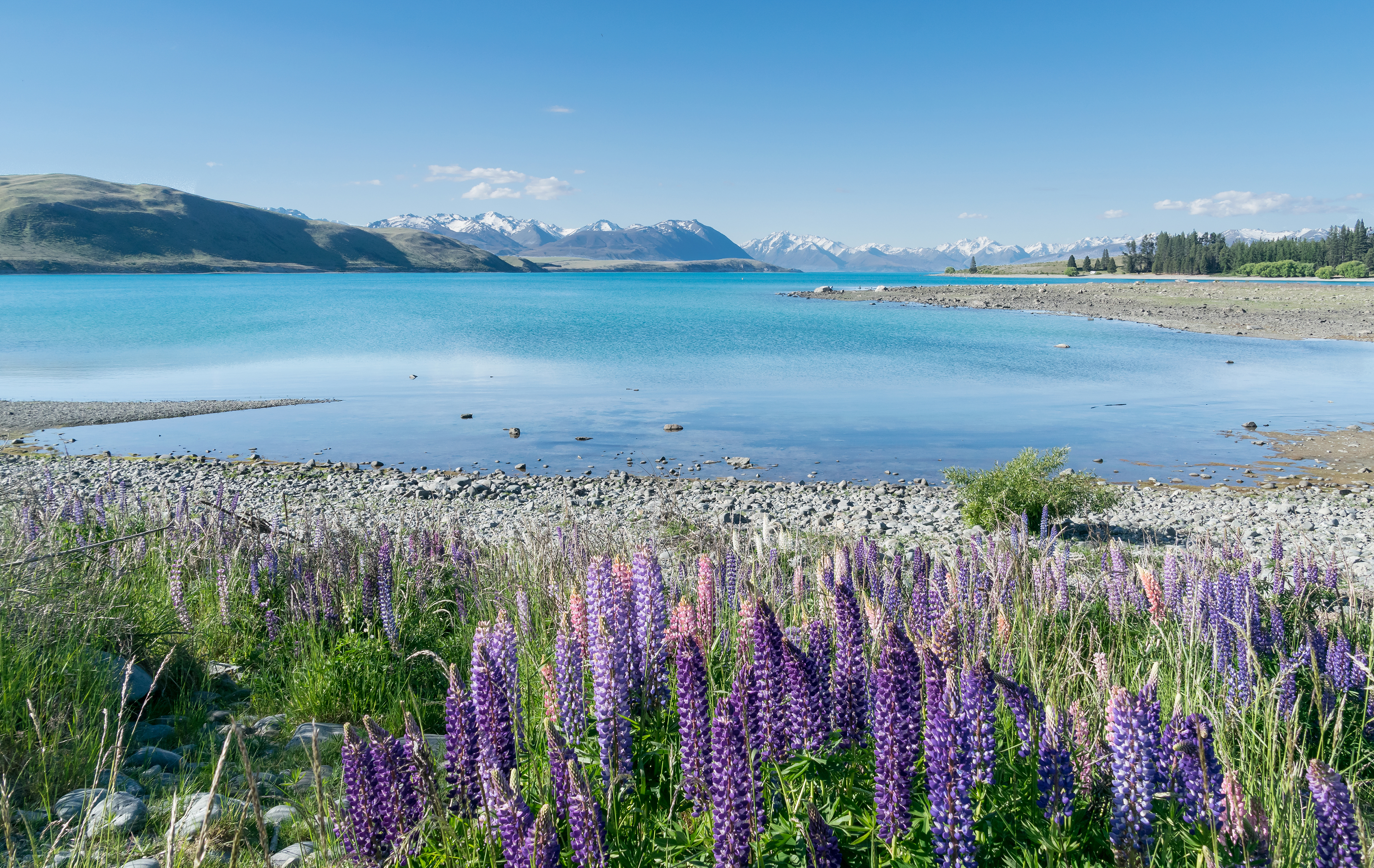
Lake Tekapo, New Zealand

A moraine-dammed lake, occurs when the terminal moraine has prevented meltwater from leaving the valley. When a glacier retreats, there is a space left over between the retreating glacier and the piece that stayed intact which holds leftover debris (moraine). Meltwater from both glaciers seep into this space creating a ribbon-shaped lake due to the pattern of ice melt. This ice melt may cause a glacier lake outburst flood, leading to severe damage to the environment and communities nearby. Examples of moraine-dammed lakes include:

- Argentina/Chile: General Carrera/Buenos Aires Lake
- Chile: Calafquén Lake, Panguipulli Lake
- Ireland: Lough Dan
- Nepal: Tsho Rolpa
- New Zealand: Lake Hāwea, Lake Ōhau, Lake Pukaki, Lake Tekapo, Lake Wakatipu, and Lake Wānaka (i.e., almost all large lakes in the South Island)
- Switzerland: Lake Zurich
- United States: Donner Lake in California, Flathead Lake in Montana, Mille Lacs Lake in Minnesota, Wallowa Lake in Oregon, Lake Chelan
- Wales: Llyn Peris and its twin Llyn Padarn.
- Poland: Morskie Oko in Zakopane
- Slovakia: Štrbské pleso, Veľké Hincovo pleso
- Central Mongolia: Lake Khagiin Khar
  - Scientists are looking closely at lake Khagiin Khar in Mongolia because they want to know whether moraine-dammed lakes' evolution relate to past glacier movements. The study they are conducting focuses on reconstructing paleo-shoreline changes and seeing how climate change is impacting the lake's water level. This is important for them to understand because climate change is an issue that is present and does not seem to be slowly down. The final results of the study, it seems, is that there was a decrease in the paleolake level due to a spillover. The spillover could have been caused by a multitude of reasons, but sense it was a study based on the effect of climate change, the only possible interpretation is that climate change caused this increase in water level due to glaciers melting quicker. However, other reasons such as excessive rain, global warming, and ice jam can all cause glaciers to melt and, therefore, cause floods.
- China: Heavenly Lake of Tianshan

== Francisco Perito Moreno discovery ==
In the 19th century the Argentine explorer Francisco Perito Moreno suggested that many Patagonian lakes draining to the Pacific were in fact part of the Atlantic basin but had been moraine dammed during the quaternary glaciations changing their outlets to the west. He argued that as originally belonging to the Atlantic basin these lakes should be awarded to Argentina. Most of the lakes situated in the Himalaya of Nepal and Bhutan are also of the moraine dammed type. They may burst at any time. That is why the areas below such lakes have high risk of flooding.

== Studies ==
=== Glacier lake outburst floods ===
Glacier lake outburst floods, or GLOFs, occur when the water level of a lake made of a glacier's melted ice overflows, causing damage to the environment and communities. Researchers have discovered that moraine-dammed lakes are the most common proglacial lake to flood. There are a total of 100,000 moraine-dammed lakes and 15% of them are susceptible to GLOFs. With this being said, researchers are working hard to understand this threat so they can come up with a way to slow this data down. 15% of 100,000 is 15,000. 15,000 lakes have a high chance of flooding the areas surrounding it. One of the first signs of climate change is water-levels, land changes, and air quality. This is why moraine-dammed lakes are perfect places to research climate change because of their constant change of shoreline and water levels.

The study took place at The Cordillera Blanca in Peru and consisted of an assessment of these moraine-dammed lakes using remote sensing, GIS, and statistical analysis. Researchers want to stop these GLOFs because they can be catastrophic, causing flooding, landslides, and damage to the environment and to communities living nearby. Newer research and observations have discovered that bedrock-dammed lakes have been creating this same issue and may overtake moraine-dammed lakes in the near future based on GLOF occurrence. Researchers expect GLOF incidents to decrease in moraine-dammed lakes in the next few decades based on topographic disposition.

== See also ==
- Glacial landforms
