= Pullinque River =

Location
- Country: Chile

Physical characteristics
- Source
  - location: Calafquén Lake
- Mouth
  - location: Pullinque Lake
  - elevation: approx. 130 m (430 ft)
- Length: 10 km (6.2 mi)

The Pullinque River, also known as Huanehue River (Spanish: Río Bueno) is a river of Chile.

== See also ==
- List of rivers of Chile
