= Carirriñe Pass =

Mountain pass between Chile and Argentina

Carirriñe
- Interactive map of Carirriñe
- Elevation: 1,223 metres (4,012 ft)

Third Approach
- Location: Argentina–Chile border
- Range: Andes
- Coordinates: 39°47′S 71°42′W

Carirriñe Pass is an international mountain pass in the Andes between Chile and Argentina. The pass connects Coñaripe and Liquiñe in Chile with Junín de los Andes in Argentina. At the site of the pass some of the southernmost Araucaria trees grows. The road is not paved and the pass may be closed most of the year due to snowfalls, minor landslides and rehabilitation. At the highest point the pass reaches 1,223 m (4,012 ft).
