= Panguipulli Lake =

Lake in Chile

Panguipulli Lake Lago Panguipulli
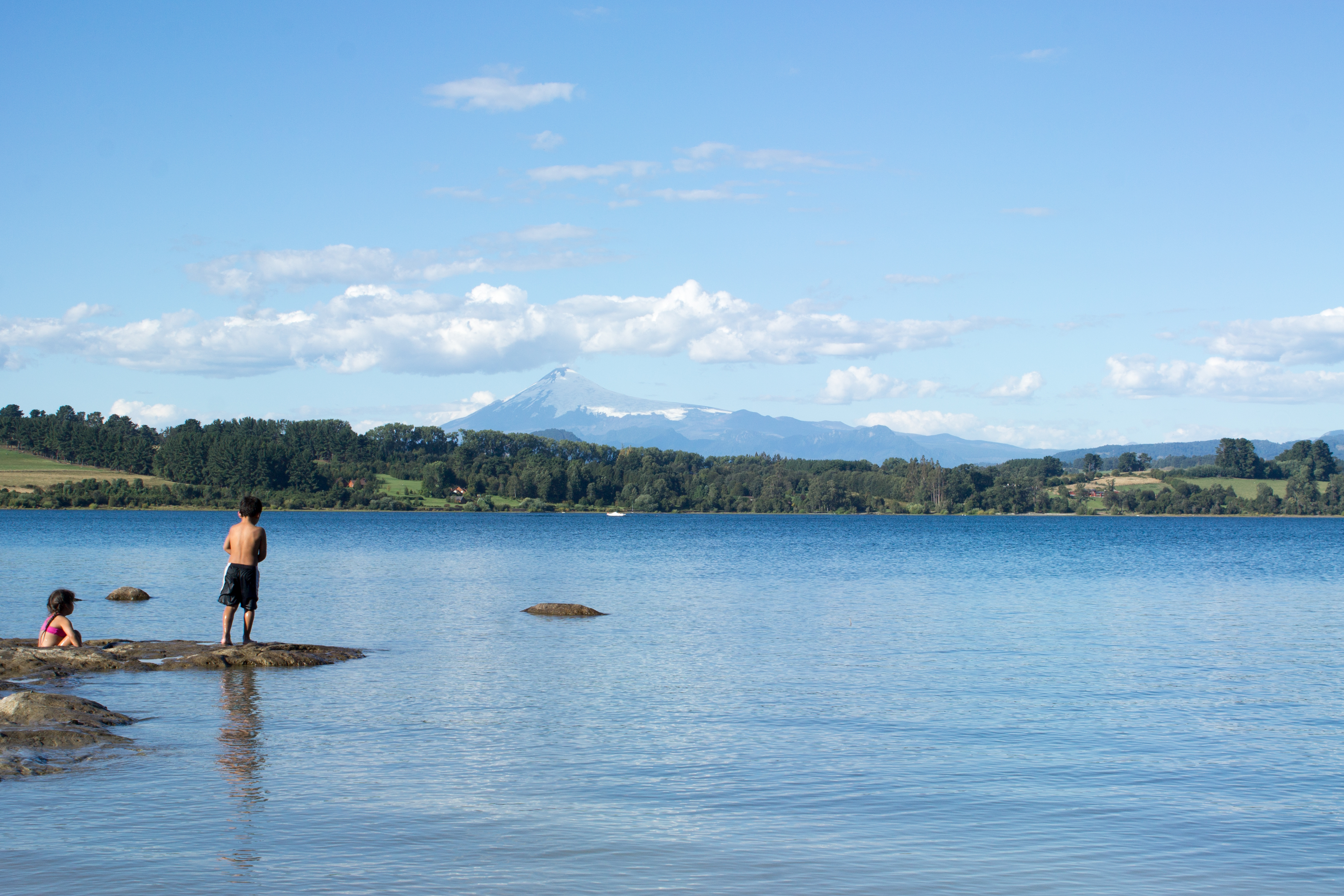

- Location within Chile
- Location: Panguipulli Commune, Valdivia Province, Los Ríos Region, Chile
- Coordinates: 39°41′39″S 72°14′30″W
- Type: Glacial, moraine-dammed, ribbon
- Primary inflows: Llanquihue River, Pullinque River
- Primary outflows: Enco River
- Catchment area: 11,056 km^{2} (4,269 sq mi)
- Basin countries: Chile
- Max. length: 29.78 km (18.50 mi)
- Max. width: 14.81 km (9.20 mi)
- Surface area: 117 km^{2} (45 sq mi)
- Average depth: 126 m (413 ft)
- Max. depth: 268 m (879 ft)
- Water volume: 14.74 km^{3} (3.54 cu mi)
- Shore length^{1}: 124.05 km (77.08 mi)
- Surface elevation: 140 m (460 ft)
- Islands: Gabriela Island
- Settlements: Panguipulli, Choshuenco
- ^{1} Shore length is not a well-defined measure.

The Panguipulli Lake (/ˌpæŋɡiˈpuːji/ PANG-gee-POO-yee; Spanish: Lago Panguipulli) is one of the "Seven Lakes" in Panguipulli municipality, southern Chile. The lake is of glacial origin and it is enclosed by mountain ranges of the Andes, on all sides except the west, where the town of Panguipulli lies in the Chilean Central Valley. The lake is drained by the Enco River that flows south to Riñihue Lake.

Deposits near the lake originate in the middle to late Triassic ages.
