= Coñaripe =

- Town
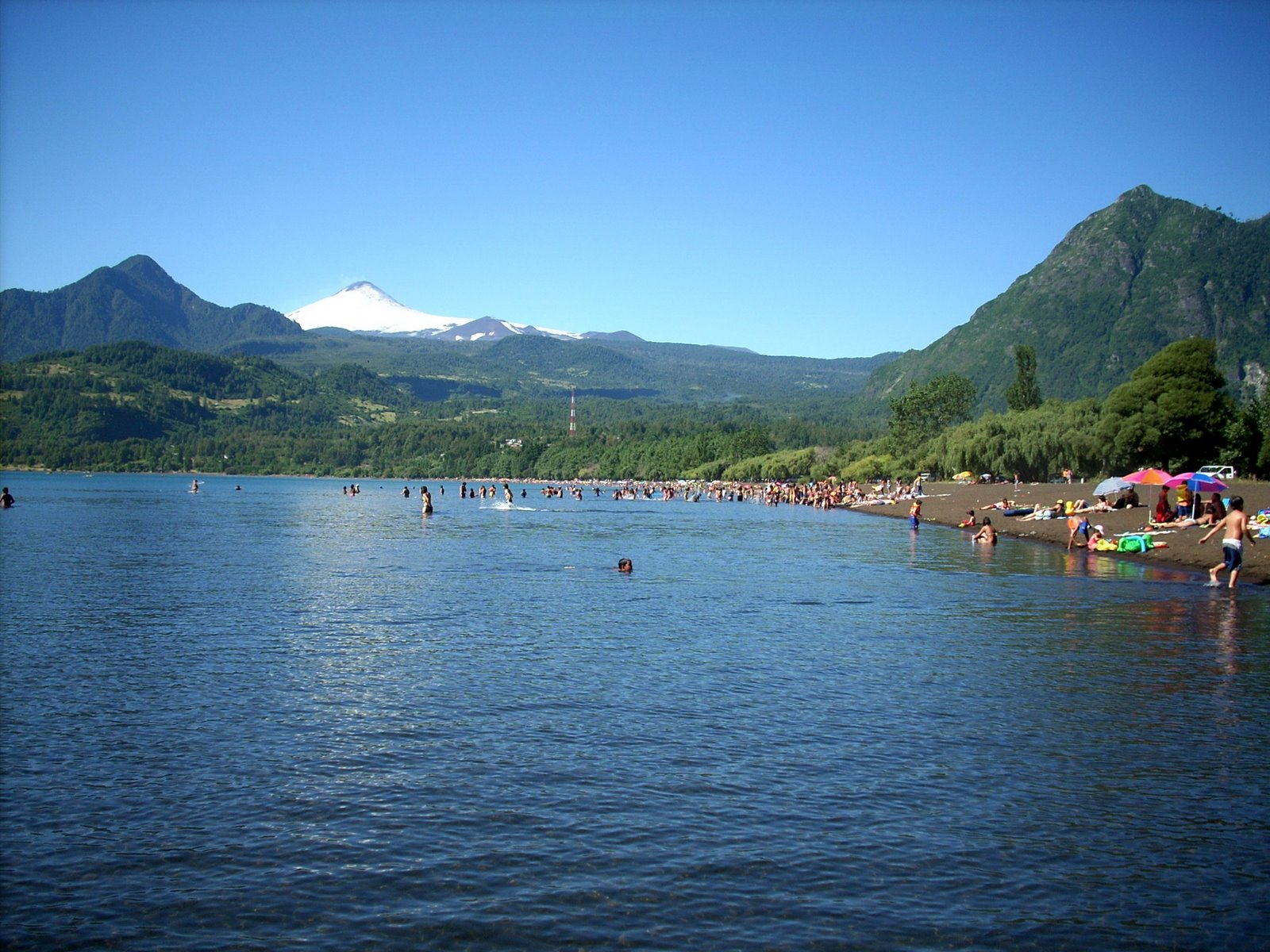
- View of the beach of Coñaripe
- Interactive map of Coñaripe
- Region: Los Ríos
- Province: Valdivia
- Municipalidad: Panguipulli
- Comuna: Panguipulli

Government
  - Type: Municipalidad
  - Alcade: René Aravena Riffo

Population
  - Total: 1,477
- Time zone: UTC−04:00 (Chilean Standard)
  - Summer (DST): UTC−03:00 (Chilean Daylight)
- Area code: Country + town = 56 + 43

Coñaripe is a town and resort area in Chile, located on the eastern side of Calafquén Lake. Administratively it belongs to Panguipulli commune in Valdivia Province of Los Ríos Region.

According to census in 2017, Coñaripe has a population of 1,477.

The town was settled in 1880 and a timber industry developed. In 1964 the Villarrica Volcano erupted and a large part of the town was destroyed. The town currently rely on tourism as its main industry.

== See also ==
- List of towns in Chile
