= Liquiñe =

- Town
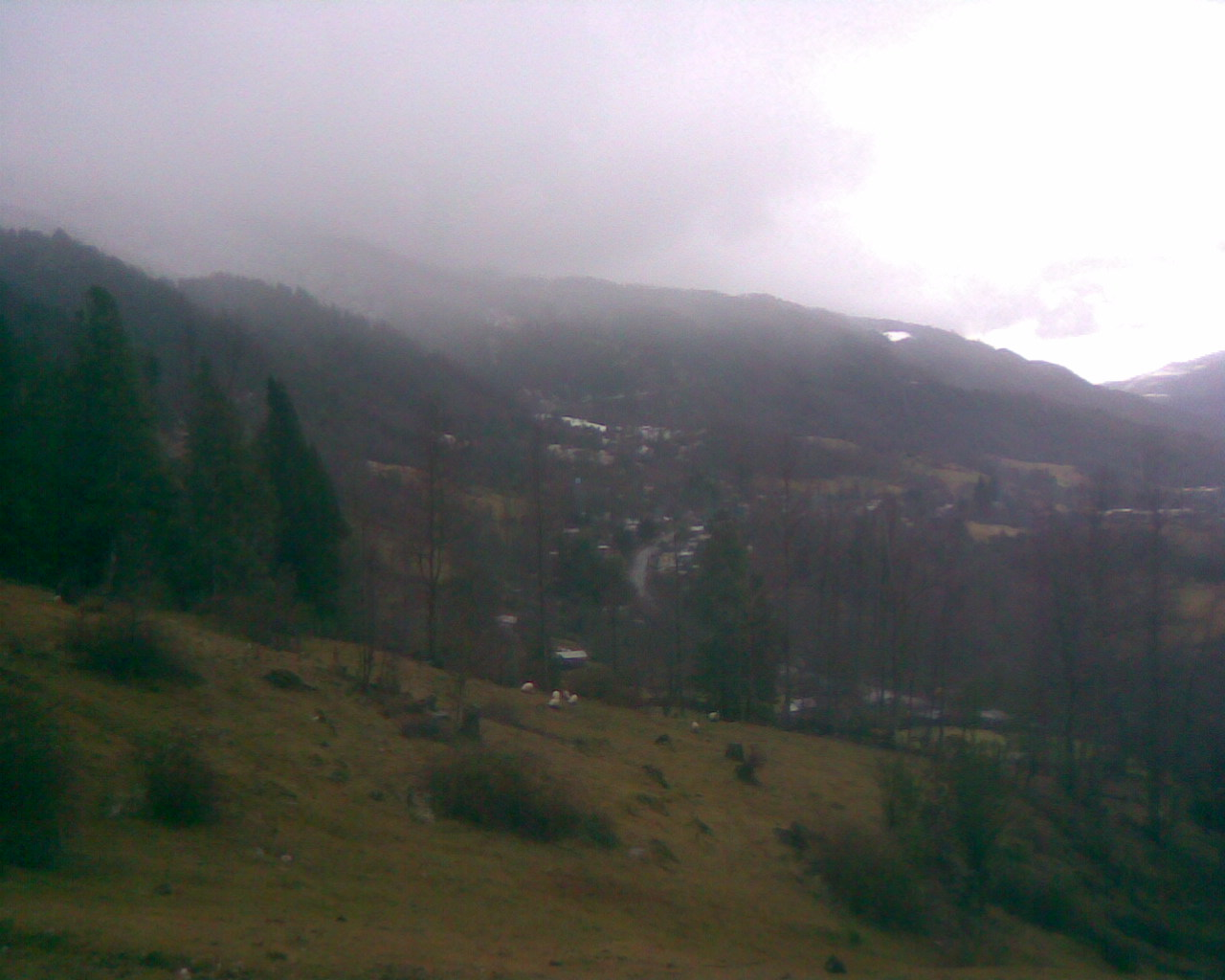
- View of Liquiñe from the south

- Location within Chile
- Coordinates: 39°44′05″S 71°51′15″W
- Country: Chile
- Region: Los Ríos
- Province: Valdivia
- Municipality: Panguipulli
- Commune: Panguipulli

Government
  - Type: Municipal
  - Alcalde: René Aravena Riffo
- Elevation: 230 m (750 ft)

Population (2002 census )
  - Total: 1,205
- Time zone: UTC−04:00 (Chilean Standard)
  - Summer (DST): UTC−03:00 (Chilean Daylight)
- Area code: Country + town = 56 + 63

Liquiñe is a town in Liquiñe Valley, in Panguipulli commune, Valdivia Province, Chile. The area around the village is home to South America's densest collection of hot springs. There are literally hundred of sites where geothermal waters flow up out of the earth. The water emerges from the ground at roughly 176°F (80°C). Therefore, the water must be cooled before being fed into pools for bathing.

The Liquiñe Hot Springs feature geothermally-heated mineral water. Geologically the town is crossed by the north-south Liquiñe-Ofqui Fault.

The road to Carirriñe Pass goes through Liquiñe, allowing transit to and from Junín de los Andes in Argentina. However, this mountain pass is only open during the summer months of January and February.

== See also ==
- List of towns in Chile
