= Calafquén Lake =

Lake in Chile

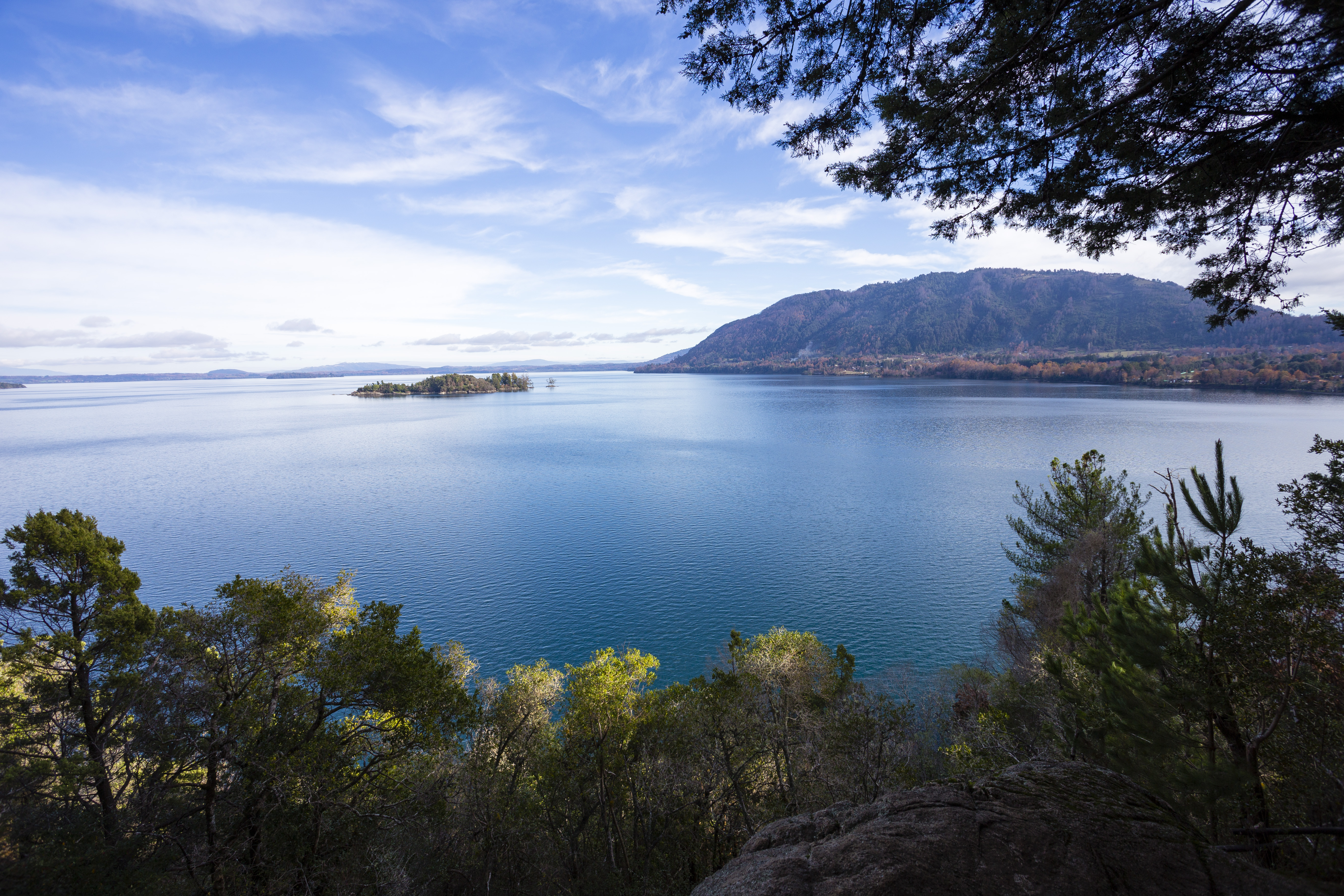

- Location within Chile
- Location: Valdivia Province
- Coordinates: 39°31′12″S 72°08′50″W
- Type: Glacial, moraine-dammed
- Primary inflows: Llancahue River
- Primary outflows: Pullinque River
- Catchment area: 11,056 km^{2} (4,269 sq mi)
- Basin countries: Chile
- Max. length: 25 km (16 mi)
- Max. width: 7.7 km (4.8 mi)
- Surface area: 114.9 km^{2} (44.4 sq mi)
- Average depth: 115 m (377 ft)
- Max. depth: 212 m (696 ft)
- Water volume: 13.21 km^{3} (3.17 cu mi)
- Shore length^{1}: 122.4 km (76.1 mi)
- Surface elevation: 203 m (666 ft)
- Settlements: Coñaripe, Calafquén, Licán Ray
- ^{1} Shore length is not a well-defined measure.

Calafquén Lake (Mapudungun: Lake like a sea) is a lake of Chile, which straddles the border between the La Araucanía Region and Los Ríos Region. It is one of the Seven Lakes and forms part of the drainage basin of the Valdivia River.

The Villarrica Volcano is situated in the vicinity, north of the lake.
