= Riñihue Lake =

Lake in Chile

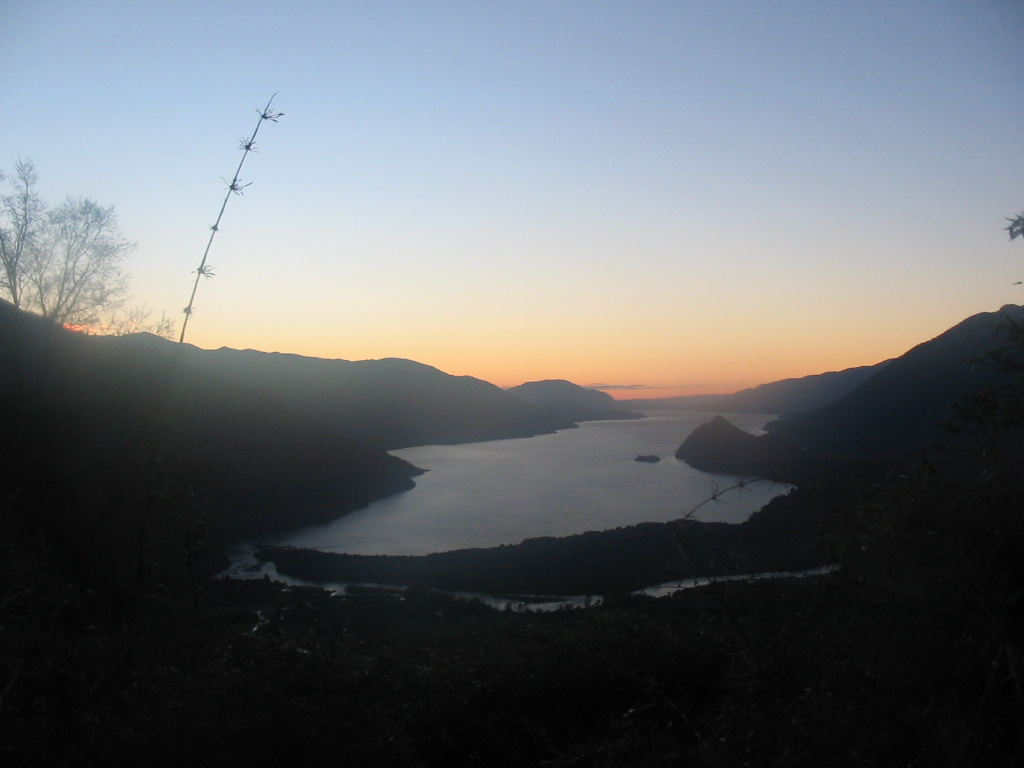
- Sunset, view from Mocho-Choshuenco

- Location within Chile
- Location: Los Lagos Commune, Valdivia Province, Los Ríos Region, Chile
- Coordinates: 39°50′36″S 72°17′39″W
- Primary inflows: Enco River
- Primary outflows: San Pedro River
- Basin countries: Chile/Argentina
- Max. length: 28.6 km (17.8 mi)
- Max. width: 5.2 km (3.2 mi)
- Surface area: 77.5 km^{2} (29.9 sq mi)
- Average depth: 162 m (531 ft)
- Max. depth: 323 m (1,060 ft)
- Water volume: 12.555 km^{3} (3.012 cu mi)
- Shore length^{1}: 77 km (48 mi)
- Surface elevation: 117 m (384 ft)
- Settlements: Riñihue
- ^{1} Shore length is not a well-defined measure.

The Riñihue Lake (Spanish: Lago Riñihue [riˈɲiwe]) is a lake of glacial origin in eastern Valdivia Province, southern Chile. It is surrounded by several mountains. The eastern side receives the waters of the Panguipulli Lake by the Enco River, its main contributor. It is the last of the Seven Lakes chain. In the west it is cut into two arms by the Tralcán Mount, and on the east side lies the Mocho-Choshuenco volcano. In the south the lake is bounded by the Cerros de Quimán mountains.

The lake's name derives from the Mapuche words rëngi, "cane", and hue, "place". In the 16th century the lake was known as Comohue, from co mu, "with water", and hue, "place".

== The Riñihuazo ==
The Riñihue lake became famous after an event known as the "Riñihuazo", which threatened to destroy several towns, villages and cities in southern Chile. During the Great Chilean earthquake a landslide near the Tralcan Mount dammed the Riñihue Lake. As the water levels of Riñihue rose more than 20 meters, the dam was in danger of breaking and flooding everything downstream, including the city of Valdivia. There were plans for evacuating the city, and many people left the city. All this ended when a large team of workers was able to open a channel for drainage in the landslide. Then the water levels of the lake sunk slowly to its normal levels. There is evidence that a similar landslide and earthquake happened in 1575.
