= Panguipulli =

- City and Commune
- Flag Coat of arms Location of the Panguipulli commune in Los Ríos Region Location in Chile
- Nicknames: City of roses, Comune of the seven lakes
- Motto: Land of Lions
- Coordinates (city): 39°38′40″S 72°19′50″W
- Country: Chile
- Region: Los Ríos
- Province: Valdivia
- Founded as: Villa de Panguipulli
- Founded: 1946

Government
  - Type: Municipality
  - Alcalde: René Aravena Riffo

Area
  - Total: 3,292.1 km^{2} (1,271.1 sq mi)
- Elevation: 130 m (430 ft)

Population (2012 Census)
  - Total: 32,525
  - Density: 9.8797/km^{2} (25.588/sq mi)
  - Urban: 15,888
  - Rural: 17,385

Sex
  - Men: 17,059
  - Women: 16,214
- Time zone: UTC−4 (CLT)
  - Summer (DST): UTC−3 (CLST)
- Area code: 56 + 63
- Climate: Cfb
- Website: www.munipangui.cl

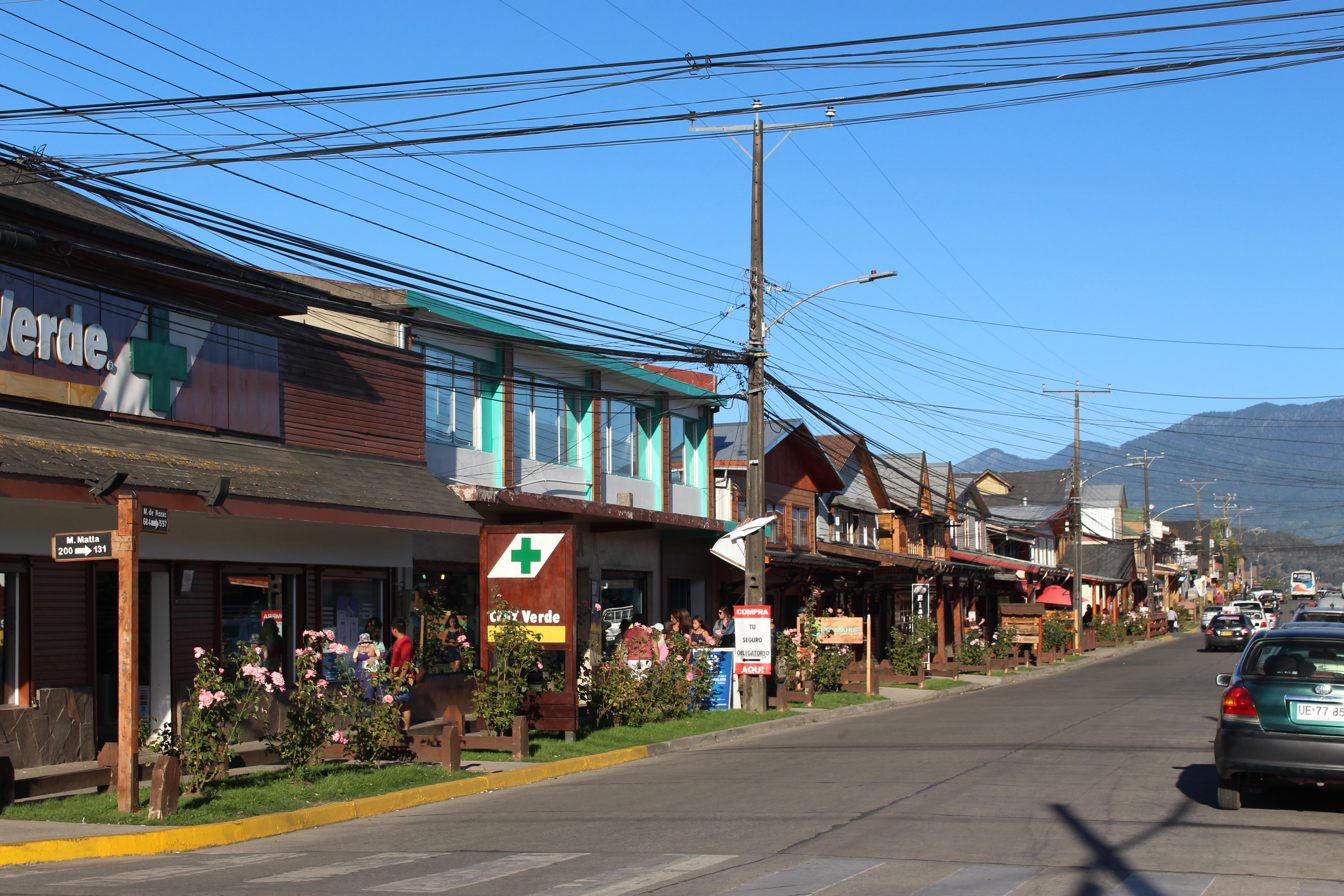
Calle Martínez de Rozas en Panguipulli

Panguipulli (/ˌpæŋɡiˈpuːji/ PANG-gee-POO-yee; Mapudungun for "hill of the puma") is a city and commune in Valdivia Province, southern Chile, administered by the Municipality of Panguipulli. It is located on the western edge of Panguipulli Lake, and is on a moraine in the Chilean Central Valley. Most of the commune lies on Andean mountains and valleys.

The commune is rich in hydropower resources and contains large tracts of protected areas such as national parks and nature reserves.

== History ==
Panguipulli's first recorded inhabitants were indigenous Mapuches that lived along the shores of the main lakes and rivers of the region. The first mention of Panguipulli was in 1776. Guillermo Angermaier, who settled in the western shores of Panguipulli Lake in 1885, was the first non-indigenous person to settle in what is now the commune of Panguipulli.

It was not until 1946 that the city was officially founded. In 1903 the Capuchin order established a mission in Panguipulli. The Capuchin monks built the first schools in the area. In 1947 the Capuchin built Panguipulli's twin towered wooden church, which is now a local landmark.

== Demographics ==
Historical population
Year	Pop.	±% p.a.
1952	25,087	—
1970	31,400	+1.25%
1982	30,192	−0.33%
1992	30,162	−0.01%
2002	33,273	+0.99%
2017	34,539	+0.25%
2024	36,220	+0.68%
Source: "Censo de Población y Vivienda". National Statistics Institute.

According to the 2002 census of the National Statistics Institute, Panguipulli spans an area of 3,292.1 km^{2} (1,271 sq mi) and has 33,273 inhabitants (17,059 men and 16,214 women). Of these, 15,888 (47.8%) lived in urban areas and 17,385 (52.2%) in rural areas. The population grew by 10.3% (3,111 persons) between the 1992 and 2002 censuses.

== Tourism ==
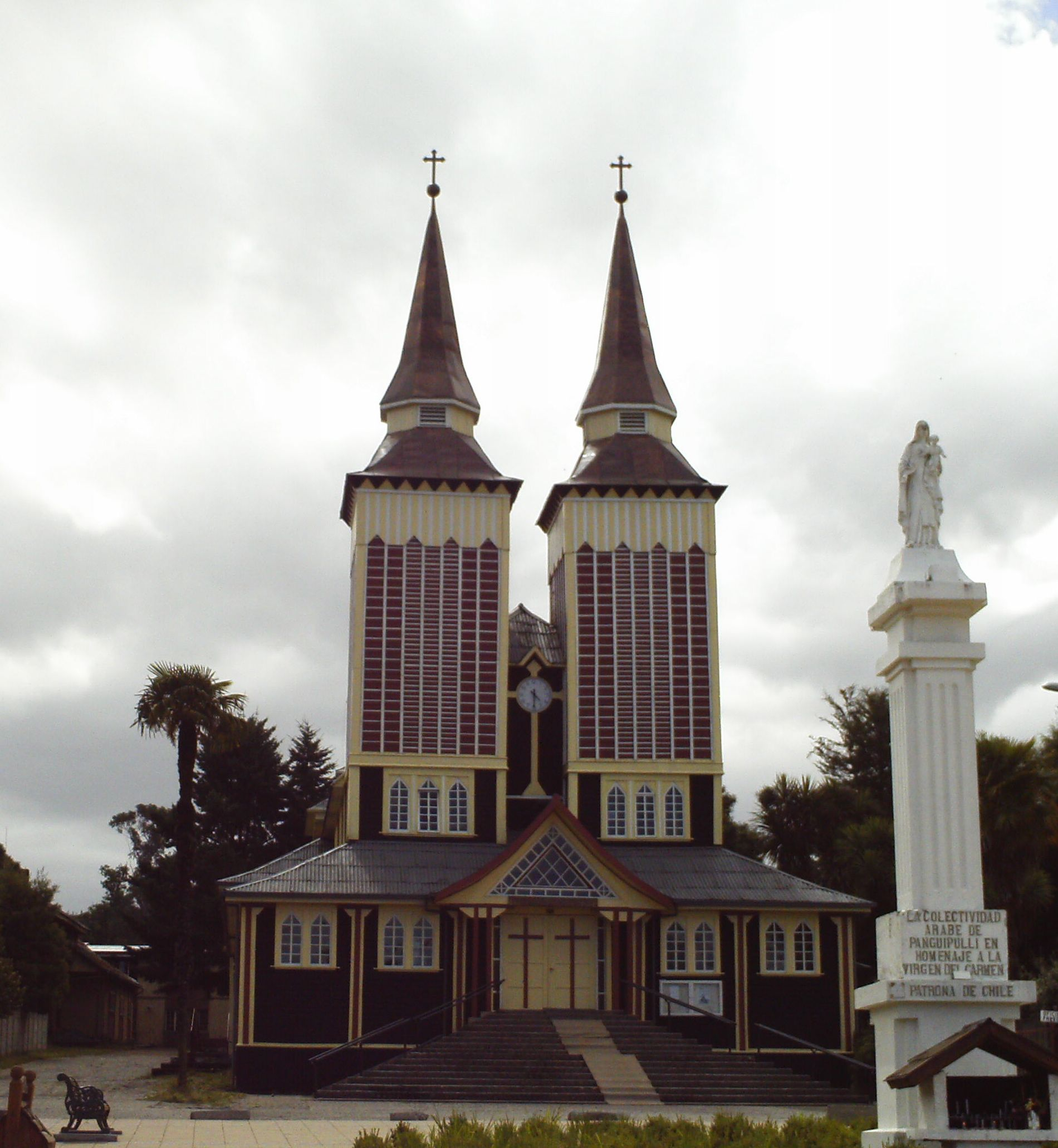
Panguipulli's Capuchin church

Most of the tourists that visit the Panguipulli area are drawn by a desire to commune with nature. The municipality uses the nearby Seven Lakes prominently in its tourist promotions. Some nearby tourist attractions include; the hot springs at Liquiñe, the Mocho-Choshuenco volcano, and the Huilo-Huilo Biological Reserve, which features year-round skiing. Rafting and wild boar hunting are also popular activities in the region.

Panguipulli is linked to San Martín de los Andes in Argentina by the Hua-Hum international pass. It is one of the few passes between Chile and Argentina that is open all year round. The international way follows a geologic fault, which has created a depression now filled by Pirihueico Lake. To get from one side of Pirihueico Lake to the other, the town of Puerto Fuy, nearly half an hour by car east of Panguipulli, operates a ferry that crosses the lake twice a day.

== Geography ==
The commune of Panguipulli is characterized by an Alpine landscape shaped by Quaternary glaciers and recent volcanism. Two morphological zones can be found in here, the Precordillera and the Andes. The Precodillera zone covers most of western Panguipulli and has forest-covered hills dissected by big thoughts occupied by the glacial lakes of Calafquén, Panguipulli and Riñihue. The first two are moraine-dammed and drain westward to Riñihue Lake.

== Administration ==
As a commune, Panguipulli is a third-level administrative division of Chile administered by a municipal council, headed by an alcalde who is directly elected every four years.

Within the electoral divisions of Chile, Panguipulli is represented in the Chamber of Deputies by Enrique Jaramillo (PDC) and Mr. Gastón von Mühlenbrock (UDI) as part of the 54th electoral district, together with Los Lagos, Futrono, Lago Ranco, Río Bueno, La Unión and Paillaco. The commune is represented in the Senate during the 2014–2022 period by Alfonso de Urresti (PS) and Ena von Baer (UDI) as part of the 16th senatorial constituency (Los Ríos Region).

== See also ==
- Mocho-Choshuenco National Reserve
