= Valdivia Province =

Valdivia Province Provincia de Valdivia
- Province
- Seal

- Location in the Los Ríos Region

- Location in Chile
- Coordinates: 39°45′S 72°30′W
- Country: Chile
- Region: Los Ríos
- Named for: Pedro de Valdivia
- Capital: Valdivia
- Communes: List of 8: Valdivia; Lanco; Máfil; Panguipulli; Corral; Mariquina; Los Lagos; Paillaco

Government
  - Type: Provincial
  - Governor: María Jose Gatíca Bertín (RN)

Area
  - Total: 10,197.2 km^{2} (3,937.2 sq mi)

Population (2012 Census)
  - Total: 272,527
  - Density: 26.7257/km^{2} (69.2192/sq mi)
  - Urban: 192,066
  - Rural: 67,177

Sex
  - Men: 128,972
  - Women: 130,271
- Time zone: UTC-4 (CLT)
  - Summer (DST): UTC-3 (CLST)
- Area code: 56 + 63
- Website: Government of Valdivia

Valdivia Province (Spanish: Provincia de Valdivia; pronounced [balˈdiβja]) is one of two provinces of the southern Chilean region of Los Ríos (XIV). The provincial capital is Valdivia. Located in the province are two important rivers, the Calle-Calle / Valdivia River and the Cruces River. It is part of Northern Patagonia and its wild virgin forest embrace the Patagonian Cordillera following the river Calle Calle down to the Pacific Ocean. It is known in Patagonia by the term "Bosque Valdiviano", referring to the primitive forest of Valdivia with its native trees. These forests are present in some parts of Northern Patagonia, both in Chile and Argentina.

== Municipalities ==
- Valdivia
- Lanco
- Máfil
- Panguipulli
- Corral
- Mariquina
- Los Lagos
- Paillaco

== Geography and demography ==
Historical population
Year	Pop.	±% p.a.
1835	8,860	—
1843	23,066	+12.70%
1854	29,293	+2.20%
1865	40,687	+3.03%
1875	53,090	+2.70%
1885	69,184	+2.68%
1895	92,925	+2.99%
1907	133,443	+3.06%
1920	185,410	+2.56%
1930	236,115	+2.45%
1940	191,642	−2.07%
1952	232,647	+1.63%
1960	259,794	+1.39%
1970	275,275	+0.58%
1982	307,150	+0.92%
1992	329,925	+0.72%
2002	259,243	−2.38%
2017	290,868	+0.77%
2024	314,623	+1.13%
Source: "Censo de Población y Vivienda". National Statistics Institute.

According to the 2002 census by the National Statistics Institute (INE), the province spans an area of 10,197.2 km^{2} (3,937 sq mi) and had a population of 259,243 inhabitants (128,972 men and 130,271 women), giving it a population density of 25.4/km^{2} (66/sq mi). Of these, 192,066 (74.1%) lived in urban areas and 67,177 (25.9%) in rural areas. Between the 1992 and 2002 censuses, the population grew by 10.9% (25,547 persons).

== Culture ==
The Valdivia International Film Festival (FICV) is the most important film event in Chile, one of the most important worldwide and in Latin America. It has been held since 1994, generally during the month of October.

The Valdivia Book Fair is organized annually by the city's Municipal Cultural Corporation, with the support of the Los Ríos Governor's Office, in the Saval Park. In this context, several authors born in the Los Ríos Region stand out, such as Maha Vial, Iván Espinoza Riesco, José Baroja, Aldo Astete Cuadra, Efraín Miranda Cárdenas, by name a few.

The Valdivia International Sculpture Symposium contest is listed as one of the most important events in Chile and prestigious in Latin America.

The Valdivia International Jazz Festival was born in July 2000. Today it is considered the oldest festival in Chile and one of the most important in this musical genre in the Southern Cone.
