= Los Esteros =

- Interactive map of Los Esteros
- Coordinates: 40°12′38″S 72°47′30″W
- Region: Los Ríos
- Province: Ranco
- Municipality: La Unión
- Commune: La Unión

Government
  - Type: Municipal
- Elevation: 138 m (453 ft)

Population (2002)
  - Total: 303
- Time zone: UTC−04:00 (Chilean Standard)
  - Summer (DST): UTC−03:00 (Chilean Daylight)
- Area code: Country + town = 56 + 64

Los Esteros is a village (Spanish: aldea) located in the commune of La Unión in Los Ríos Region, in Southern Chile.
