= Cayurruca =

- Interactive map of Cayurruca
- Coordinates: 40°18′21″S 72°41′31″W
- Region: Los Ríos
- Province: Ranco
- Municipality: Río Bueno
- Commune: Río Bueno

Government
  - Type: Municipal
- Elevation: 187 m (614 ft)

Population (2017)
  - Total: 268

Sex
  - Men: 125
  - Women: 143
- Time zone: UTC−04:00 (Chilean Standard)
  - Summer (DST): UTC−03:00 (Chilean Daylight)
- Area code: Country + town = 56 + 64

Cayurruca is a hamlet (Spanish: caserío) located in the commune of Río Bueno in Los Ríos Region, southern Chile. It sits at a major local rural crossroad, serving as the intersection where Ruta T-851 meets Ruta T-835. In 2017 it had a population of 268 up from 211 in 2002.The heart of the town’s civic life consists of a community museum, a local sports gymnasium (gimnasio), and its neighborhood schools, which serve the surrounding agricultural workers and families.
