= Choroico =

Village in Ranco, Los Ríos, Chile

- Interactive map of Choroico
- Coordinates: 40°12′25″S 72°54′58″W
- Region: Los Ríos
- Province: Ranco
- Municipality: La Unión
- Commune: La Unión

Government
  - Type: Municipal
- Elevation: 88 m (289 ft)

Population (2002)
  - Total: 404
- Time zone: UTC−04:00 (Chilean Standard)
  - Summer (DST): UTC−03:00 (Chilean Daylight)
- Area code: Country + town = 56 + 64

Choroico is a village (Spanish: aldea) located in the commune of Cunco in Araucania, southern Chile.
