= Daglipulli =

- Interactive map of Daglipulli
- Coordinates: 40°15′8.92″S 73°2′19.54″W
- Region: Los Ríos
- Province: Ranco
- Municipality: La Unión
- Commune: La Unión

Government
  - Type: Municipal
- Time zone: UTC−04:00 (Chilean Standard)
  - Summer (DST): UTC−03:00 (Chilean Daylight)
- Area code: Country + town = 56 + 64

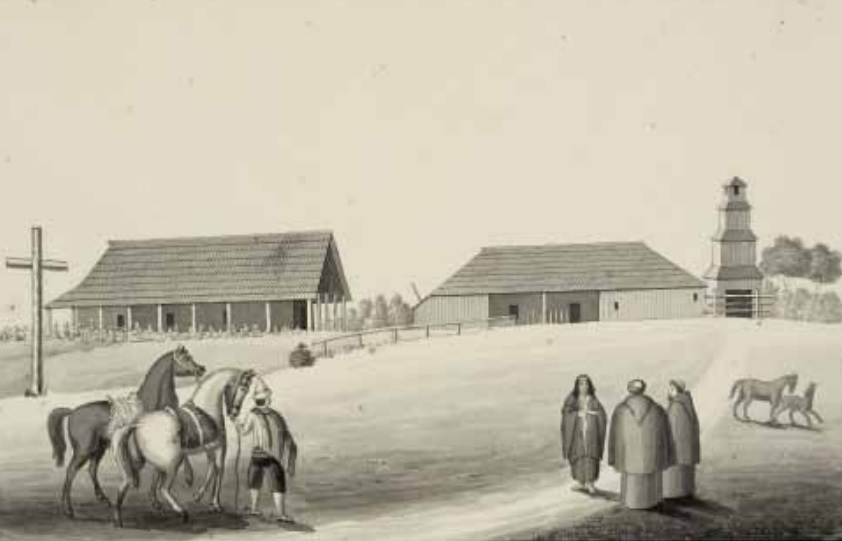
Mission of Daglipulli in 1852.

Daglipulli is a locality in Ranco Province, Los Ríos Region, southern Chile. It is located on the western (or right) bank of Llollelhue River. As of 1899 Daglipulli had 640 inhabitants.

Daglipulli was established in 1788 as a mission for indigenous tribes. In 1844 the church was built anew.
