= Ignao =

- Interactive map of Ignao
- Coordinates: 40°19′51″S 72°33′17″W
- Region: Los Ríos
- Province: Ranco
- Municipality: Lago Ranco
- Commune: Lago Ranco

Government
  - Type: Municipal
- Elevation: 230 m (750 ft)

Population (2002)
  - Total: 325
- Time zone: UTC−04:00 (Chilean Standard)
  - Summer (DST): UTC−03:00 (Chilean Daylight)
- Area code: Country + town = 56 + 64

Ignao is a village (Spanish: aldea) located in the commune of Lago Ranco in Los Ríos Region, southern Chile.

The name is said to originate from a Mapudungun corruption/clipping of the Spanish name Ignacio.
