= Los Conales =

- Interactive map of Los Conales
- Coordinates: 40°14′18″S 73°00′23″W
- Region: Los Ríos
- Province: Ranco
- Municipality: La Unión
- Commune: La Unión

Government
  - Type: Municipal
- Elevation: 55 m (180 ft)

Population (2002 census )
  - Total: 90
- Time zone: UTC−04:00 (Chilean Standard)
  - Summer (DST): UTC−03:00 (Chilean Daylight)
- Area code: Country + town = 56 + 63

Los Conales is a hamlet (Spanish: caserío) eight kilometers north of the city of La Unión. The hamlets lies along the Southern Railway of Chile.
