= Chihuío =

- Interactive map of Chihuío
- Coordinates: 40°11′39″S 71°56′09″W
- Region: Los Ríos
- Province: Ranco
- Municipality: Futrono
- Commune: Futrono

Government
  - Type: Municipal
  - Alcade: Jorge Tatter Oñate (UDI)
- Elevation: 300 m (980 ft)

Population (2002 census )
  - Total: 5
- Time zone: UTC−04:00 (Chilean Standard)
  - Summer (DST): UTC−03:00 (Chilean Daylight)
- Area code: Country + town = 56 + 63

Chihuío is a hot spring and hamlet along Curringue River in the Andes of Futrono commune, southern Chile.

== Massacre of prisoners ==
In October 1973, about one month after the 1973 Chilean coup d'etat, the Chilean Army gathered the prisoners of the police stations of Futrono, Llifén and Chabranco and brought them to Chihuío. On the way to Chihuío the trucks became stuck in the mud, forcing the prisoners and soldiers to walk. The group walked through the night and on October 9 reached the small hamlet of Chihuío. There some prisoners were tied with barbed wire. Later the prisoners were ordered to run, and then the soldiers shot at them. The prisoners' bodies were then piled in the road and partly covered with trunks and tree branches.

== See also ==
- Caravan of Death
- List of hotsprings of Chile
- Neltume Guerrilla
