= Nontuela =

- Interactive map of Nontuela
- Coordinates: 40°03′20″S 72°32′43″W
- Region: Los Ríos
- Province: Ranco
- Municipality: Futrono
- Commune: Futrono

Government
  - Type: Municipal
  - Alcade: Claudio Lavado Castro
- Elevation: 265 m (869 ft)

Population (2002 census )
  - Total: 1,048
- Time zone: UTC−04:00 (Chilean Standard)
  - Summer (DST): UTC−03:00 (Chilean Daylight)
- Area code: Country + town = 56 + 63

Nontuela is a town (Spanish: pueblo) located in the northwestern part of Futrono commune, southern Chile. The town lies about 10 km northwest of Ranco Lake and only about 3 km west of the Andean foothills.
