= Puerto Pirihueico =

- Interactive map of Puerto Pirihueico
- Coordinates: 30°01′29″S 71°43′21″W
- Region: Los Ríos
- Province: Valdivia
- Municipalidad: Panguipulli
- Comuna: Panguipulli

Government
  - Type: Municipalidad
  - Alcade: René Aravena Riffo

Population (2002 census)
  - Total: 13
- Time zone: UTC−04:00 (Chilean Standard)
  - Summer (DST): UTC−03:00 (Chilean Daylight)
- Area code: Country + town = 56 + 63

Puerto Pirihueico or Pirehueico is a Chilean village (Spanish: aldea) in Panguipulli commune, of Los Ríos Region. Puerto Pirehueico lies along the 203-CH route to Huahum Pass into Argentina at eastern edge of Pirihueico Lake and is a terminal station of the ferry that crosses the lake connecting to Puerto Fuy.

Geologically Puerto Pirihueico is placed on top of Holocene sediments on the Reigolil-Pirihueico Fault.
