= Chabranco =

- Interactive map of Chabranco
- Coordinates: 40°13′59.38″S 71°57′29.9″W
- Region: Los Ríos
- Province: Ranco
- Municipalidad: Futrono
- Comuna: Futrono

Government
  - Type: Municipalidad
  - Alcalde: Claudio Lavado
- Elevation: 500 m (1,600 ft)

Population (2017 census )
  - Total: 174
- Time zone: UTC−04:00 (Chilean Standard)
  - Summer (DST): UTC−03:00 (Chilean Daylight)
- Area code: Country + town = 56 + 63

Chabranco is a hamlet in the hills northeast of Maihue Lake, south-central Chile. It lies along to road to Lilpela Pass and the hot springs of Chihuío. It had 174 inhabitants as of 2017.
