= Curriñe =

- Interactive map of Curriñe
- Coordinates: 40°12′54″S 72°00′06″W
- Region: Los Ríos
- Province: Ranco
- Municipality: Futrono
- Commune: Futrono

Government
  - Type: Municipal
  - Alcade: Sarita Jaramillo Arismendi
- Elevation: 168 m (551 ft)

Population (2002 census )
  - Total: 725
- Time zone: UTC−04:00 (Chilean Standard)
  - Summer (DST): UTC−03:00 (Chilean Daylight)
- Area code: Country + town = 56 + 63

Curriñe is a village (Spanish: aldea) located at the confluence of Blanco River and Curriñe River, near northern shore of Maihue Lake, Futrono commune, southern Chile.
