= Cerros de Quimán =

Mountain in Chile

Coordinates: 40°01′13″S 72°16′34″W

Cerros de Quimán is a forest-covered mountain group between Riñihue Lake and Ranco Lake in Chile. The mountain group runs east–west from Cordillera Negra and Mocho-Choshuenco Volcano in the east and forms part of the border between Futrono and Los Lagos municipalities of Los Ríos Region.
