= Pucono =

Hamlet in southern Chile

Pucono Puconu
- Interactive map of Pucono
- Coordinates: 39°45′24″S 72°38′35″W
- Region: Los Ríos
- Province: Valdivia
- Municipality: Los Lagos
- Commune: Los Lagos

Government
  - Type: Municipal
- Time zone: UTC−04:00 (Chilean Standard)
  - Summer (DST): UTC−03:00 (Chilean Daylight)
- Area code: Country + town = 56 + 64

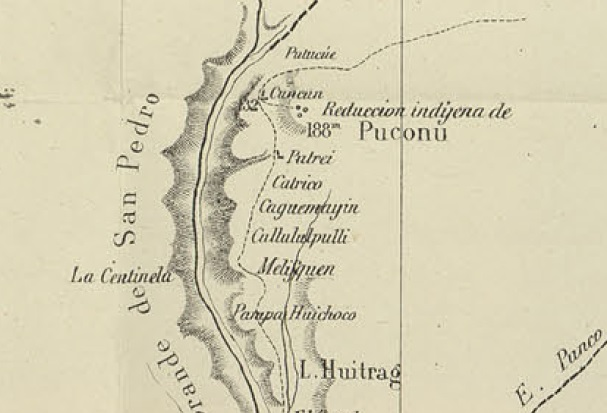
Camino Real from the mission of Quinchilca to the indigenous reduction of Puconu according to the map prepared by the expedition of Francisco Vidal Gormaz in 1869.

Pucono or Puconu is a hamlet in the left and southern bank of San Pedro River, Los Lagos commune, southern Chile.
