= Los Maitenes de Villa Vieja Airport =

Airport in Chile

- IATA: none; ICAO: SCVV

Summary
- Airport type: Public
- Serves: Río Bueno, Chile
- Elevation AMSL: 147 ft / 45 m
- Coordinates: 40°19′05″S 72°58′47″W

Map
- Location of Los Maitenes de Villa Vieja Airport in Chile

Runways
Direction	Length		Surface
Direction	m	ft	Surface
18/36	700	2,297	Grass
- Source: Landings.com Google Maps GCM

Los Maitenes de Villa Vieja Airport Spanish: Aeropuerto Los Maitenes de Villa Vieja, (ICAO: SCVV) is an airport serving Río Bueno, a town in the Los Ríos Region of Chile.

The airport is across the Bueno River, 2 kilometres (1.2 mi) northwest of the town. The runway has an additional 250 metres (820 ft) of grass overrun on the north end.

The Osorno VOR-DME (Ident: OSO) is 18.3 nautical miles (33.9 km) south-southwest of the airport.

== See also ==
- Transport in Chile
- List of airports in Chile
