= Pirihueico Lake =

Lake in Chile

Pirihueico Lake Lago Pirihueico
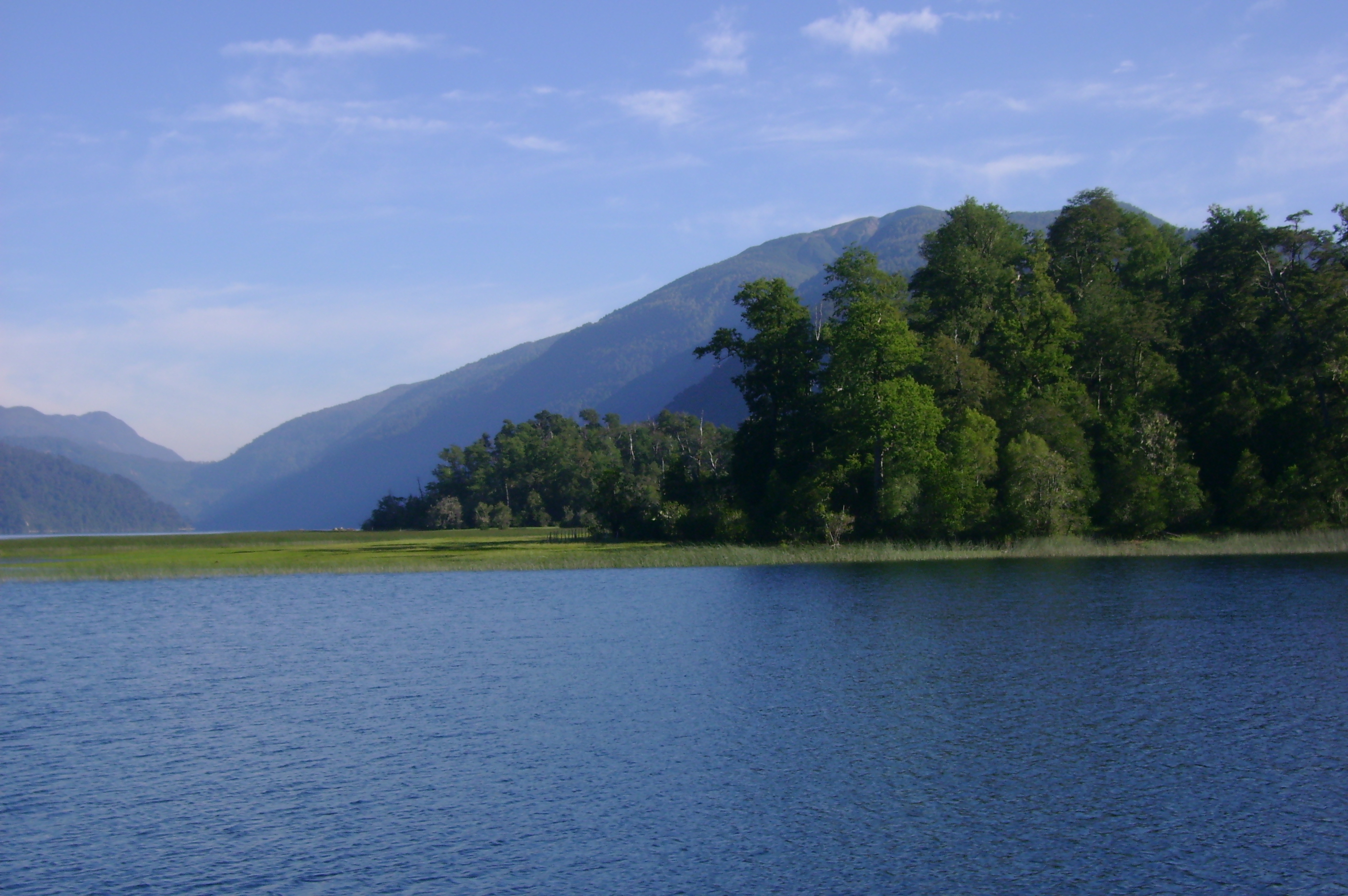

- Location within Chile
- Location: Panguipulli Commune, Valdivia Province, Los Ríos Region, Chile
- Coordinates: 39°55′48″S 71°47′25″W
- Type: Glacial
- Primary inflows: Huahum River
- Primary outflows: Fui River
- Basin countries: Chile, Argentina
- Surface area: 30.4 km^{2} (11.7 sq mi)
- Average depth: ~ 62 m (203 ft)
- Max. depth: 145 m (476 ft)
- Water volume: 1.88 km^{3} (0.45 cu mi)
- Surface elevation: 586 m (1,923 ft)
- Settlements: Puerto Fuy, Puerto Pirihueico

Pirihueico Lake (Spanish: Lago Pirihueico, Spanish pronunciation: [piɾiˈwejko] Pronounced: /ˌpɪəriˈweɪkoʊ/ PEER-ee-WAY-koh) is one of Seven Lakes in Panguipulli Commune, southern Chile. The lake is of glacial origin and it is enclosed mountains of the Andes. It is located in a geological fault that includes Panguipulli Lake and Lácar Lake in Argentina. The lake is drained by Fui River. Pirihueico Lake is used as a waterway due to its elonged shape. It is used mostly by vehicles traveling to or from Argentina by the nearby Huahum Pass. For that reason there is a ferry operating between Puerto Fuy and Puerto Pirihueico in the western respectively eastern extreme of the lake.
