= Llollelhue River =

Llollelhue River (Río Llollelhue)
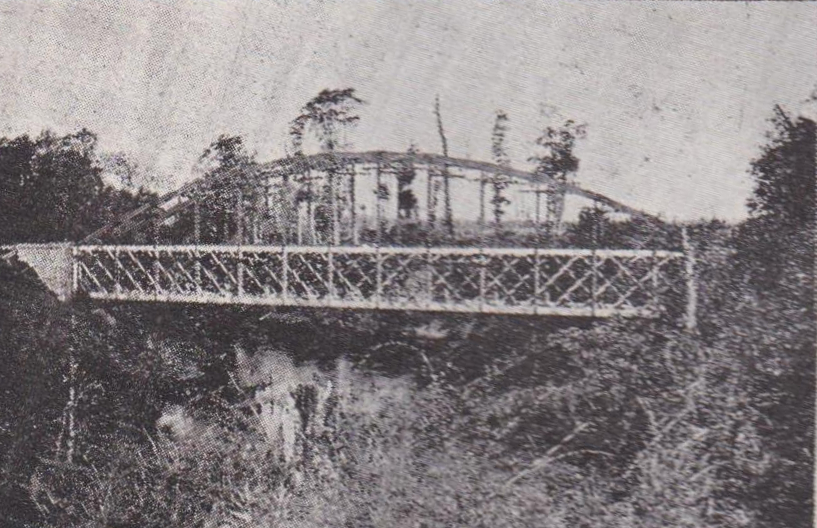

Location
- Country: Chile

Physical characteristics
- Source
  - location: Near Futrono in the vicinity of Ranco Lake
- Mouth: Bueno River
  - coordinates: 40°20′08″S 73°06′52″W
- Length: 95 km (59 mi)

Llollelhue River (Spanish: Río Llollelhue) is a river in south-central Chile. It originates near Futrono in the vicinities of Ranco Lake and flows then in a general southwestern direction until discharging in Bueno River. The city of La Unión and the locality of Daglipulli are located on its western (or right) bank.

Llollelhue River also passes near the village of El Llolly and the locality of Puerto Los Llolles. The river and these two places share an etymology derived from the local word "llolle" meaning fish trap.
