= Malalhue =

Town in Los Ríos, Chile

Coordinates: 39°32′S 72°31′W

- Town and Commune
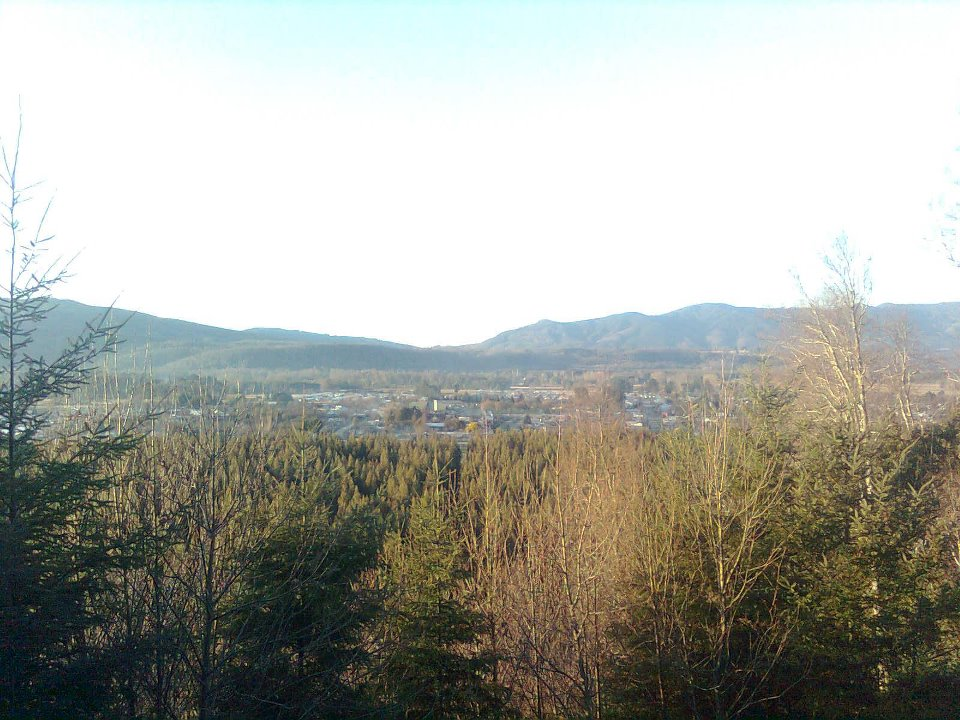
- Interactive map of Malalhue
- Country: Chile
- Region: Los Ríos
- Province: Valdivia
- Municipalidad: Lanco
- Comuna: Lanco

Government
  - Type: Municipalidad
  - Alcalde: Rolando Peña Riquelme

Population (2017 census)
  - Total: 3,061
- Time zone: UTC−04:00 (Chilean Standard)
  - Summer (DST): UTC−03:00 (Chilean Daylight)
- Area code: Country + town = 56 + ?

Malalhue is a town (Spanish: pueblo) in the commune of Lanco within the Los Ríos Region of southern Chile. The economy of Malalhue is based on construction, agriculture, retail trade, and the production of wood and wood-based products. The town lies along the International Route 203-CH that connects Lanco with Panguipulli.

== Location ==
Malalhue is a town located in the commune of Lanco, within the Los Ríos Region of southern Chile. It is situated along the International Route 203-CH that connects Lanco with Panguipulli.

== Etymology ==
The etymology of the word Malalhue dates back to the Mapuche communities that formerly dominated the area, and means "enclosed place."

== Demographics ==
As of the 2017 census in Chile, Malalhue had a population of 3,061 people, showing an increase from 2,566 in 2002 and 2,092 in 1992. The town has experienced a steady population growth, with an average annual growth rate of 1.2% between 2002 and 2017. This growth happened due to the town's connection to a main road and its strategic location for medium-distance travel.

Malalhue covers an area of 1.548 km², resulting in a population density of approximately 1,977 people per square kilometer in 2017. In terms of gender distribution, the 2017 census recorded 1,463 males (47.8%) and 1,598 females (52.2%), indicating a slightly higher female population.

== Economy ==
The economy of Malalhue is based on the population being employed in sectors such as construction, agriculture, retail trade, and the production of wood and wood-based products. Part of the wood production is the manufacturing of oriented strand boards at the Louisiana-Pacific manufacturing plant near the town.

== See also ==
- List of towns in Chile
