= Antilhue =

Coordinates: 39°48′S 72°58′W

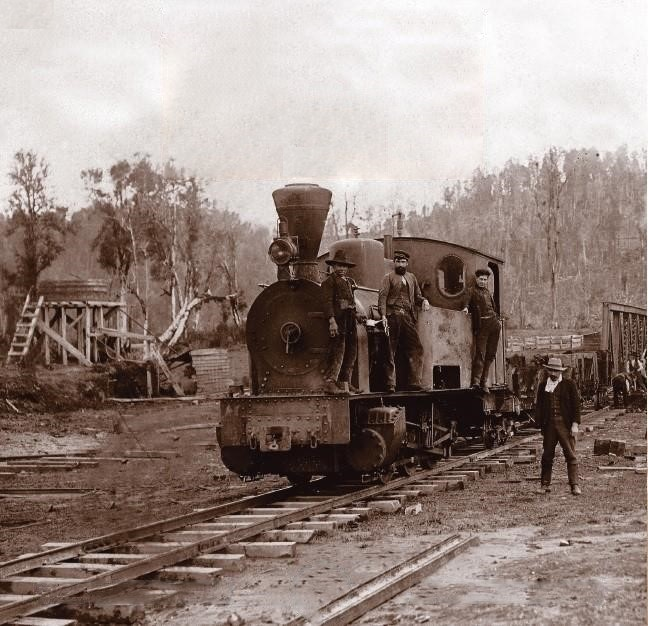
- Railway Valdivia – Los Lagos – Antilhue
- Interactive map of Antilhue
- Region: Los Ríos
- Province: Valdivia
- Municipalidad: Los Lagos
- Comuna: Los Lagos

Government
  - Type: Municipalidad
  - Alcade: Simón Mansilla Roa (1996-2008)

Population (2017 census https://www.citypopulation.de/en/chile/losrios/valdivia/14104003009__antilhue/)
  - Total: 836
- Time zone: UTC−04:00 (Chilean Standard)
  - Summer (DST): UTC−03:00 (Chilean Daylight)
- Area code: Country + town = 56 + 63

Antilhue is a village (Spanish: aldea) in Chile, South America. It is located in the commune of Los Lagos on the shores of Calle-Calle River just east of Valdivia. Two petroleum-fueled power plants, Antilhue I and Antilhue II, with a combined production capacity of 101.3 MW, are located near the village.

Antihue is linked to other places by its railway which is a notable part of the village. With this railway the economy and social development of Antihue grew. One of the most popular sites to see in Antihue is the El Valdiviano which is a steam train that gives a 28km journey from Valdivia through other station like Huellelhue, and Pishuinco and then arriving at Antilhue. El Valdiviano can hold 390 passengers and has a dining car. It offers a comfortable experience for tourists.

== Notable people ==
- Victorino Antilef, member of the Chilean Constitutional Convention
