= Puerto Fuy =

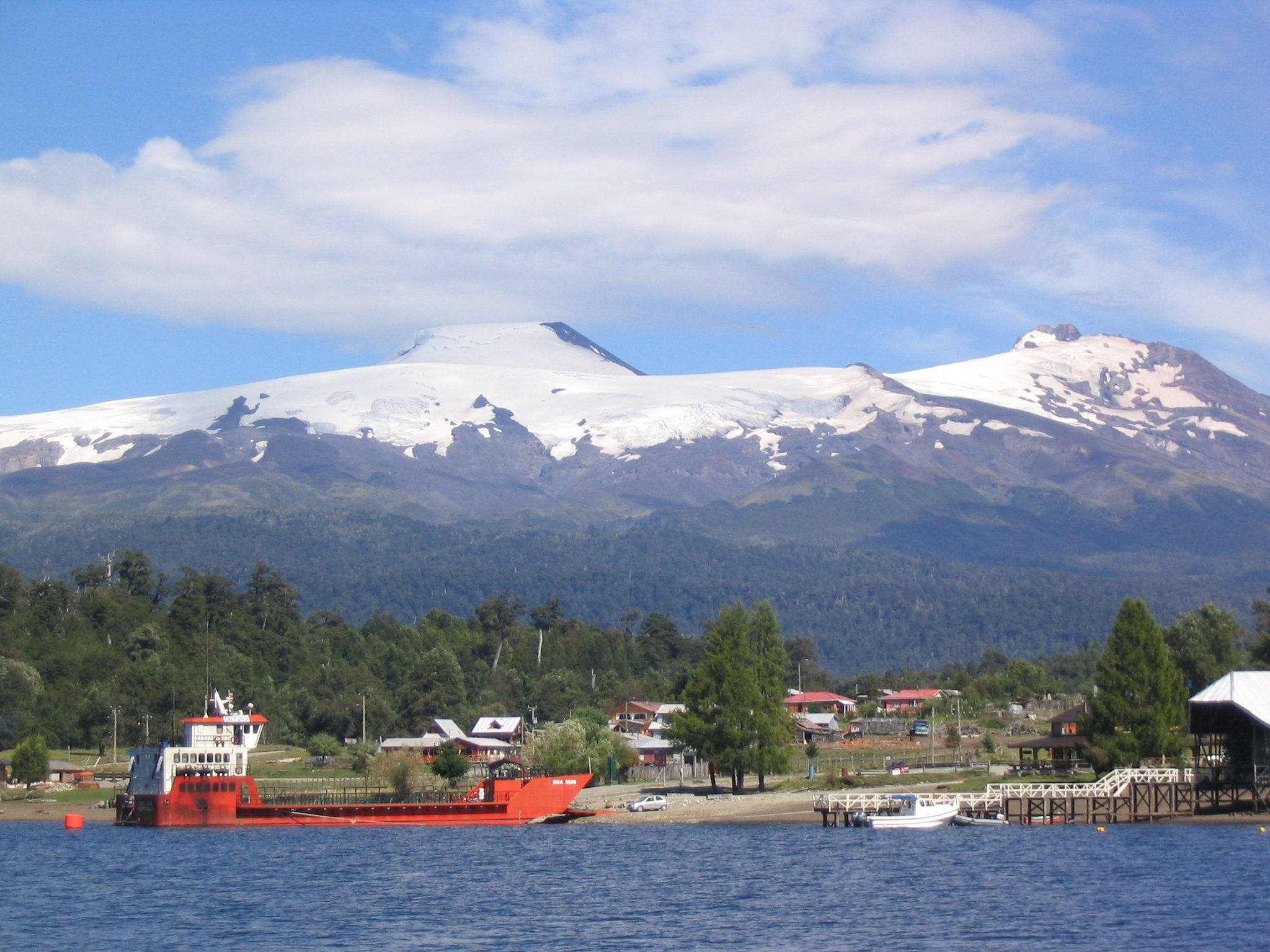
- Puerto Fui and its ferry at Pirihueico Lake. Mocho-Choshuenco Volcano in the background.
- Interactive map of Puerto Fuy
- Coordinates: 39°52′23″S 71°53′27″W
- Region: Los Ríos
- Province: Valdivia
- Municipalidad: Panguipulli
- Comuna: Panguipulli

Government
  - Type: Municipalidad
  - Alcade: Alejandro Kohler

Population (2002 census)
  - Total: 391
- Time zone: UTC−04:00 (Chilean Standard)
  - Summer (DST): UTC−03:00 (Chilean Daylight)
- Area code: Country + town = 56 + 63

Puerto Fuy is a Chilean village (Spanish: aldea) in Panguipulli commune, of Los Ríos Region. Puerto Fuy lies along the 203-CH route to Huahum Pass into Argentina at western edge of Pirihueico Lake and is a terminal station of the ferry that crosses the lake connecting to Puerto Pirihueico.
