= Salto del Nilahue =

Coordinates: 40°17′07″S 72°10′22″W

- Interactive map of Salto del Nilahue
- Location: Lago Ranco, Chile
- Total height: ~40m
- Number of drops: 2
- Watercourse: Nilahue River

Salto del Nilahue is a waterfall located in the commune of Lago Ranco in southern Chile. It lies in the lower flows of Nilahue River.
