= Victorino Antilef =

Chilean politician

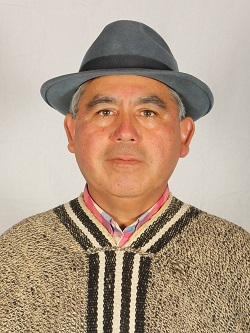

Member of the Constitutional Convention of Chile
- In office 4 July 2021 – 4 July 2022
- Preceded by: office established

Personal details
- Born: Victorino Ernesto Antilef Ñanco; September 20, 1969 (age 56) Antilhue, Chile
- Occupation: Educator

Victorino Ernesto Antilef Ñanco (born 20 September 1969) is a Mapuche educator and politician in Chile. In 2021, Antilef was elected to the Chilean Constitutional Convention to represent the Mapuche people, who are entitled to seven reserved seats on the newly formed body.

== Early life and career ==
Victorino Antilef was born on 20 September 1969 and was raised in Antilhue, Los Ríos Region. Antilef is a fluent speaker of Mapudungun and attended the Pontifical Catholic University of Chile. Additionally, Antilef is a member of the Mapuche Kalfulikan Association of Los Ríos.

A teacher of intercultural education, Antilef has attended events hosted by institutions such as the Austral University of Chile and the University of La Frontera to promote Mapuche cultural knowledge. One area of cultural revitalization that Antilef has emphasized is the protection of traditional Mapuche sports such as palín (referred to in Spanish as chueca), a stick-and-ball game.

== Constitutional Convention ==
As a member of the Constitutional Convention, Antilef has pushed for the "cultural revitalization" of Mapuche customs. Antilef has indicated that environmental policy is his primary concern and has stated that "[i]t is essential to start talking about nature as a subject of law". Antilef has connected the cause of environmental preservation to that of preserving indigenous cultures, explained that the natural environment holds spiritual significance to the Mapuche people and intertwined with Mapuche cultural values.

During the 2021 election for President of the Constitutional Convention, Antilef supported fellow Mapuche activist and eventual victor Elisa Loncón.
