= El Llolly =

- Interactive map of El Llolly
- Coordinates: 40°4′5.3″S 72°36′56.01″W
- Region: Los Ríos
- Province: Valdivia
- Municipalidad: Paillaco
- Comuna: Paillaco

Government
  - Type: Municipalidad
  - Alcalde: Jaime Reyes Durán
- Elevation: 13 m (43 ft)

Population (2017 census )
  - Total: 429
- Time zone: UTC−04:00 (Chilean Standard)
  - Summer (DST): UTC−03:00 (Chilean Daylight)
- Area code: Country + town = 56 + 63

El Llolly is a village east of the town of Paillaco, south-central Chile. The village is located in the Chilean Central Valley near Ranco Lake. It had 429 inhabitants as of 2017. The village lies next to Llollelhue River, with which it shares an etymology derived from the local word "llolle" meaning fish trap.
