= Antilhue Power Plant =

Fossil fuel power station in Chile

Antilhue I Power Plant and Antilhue II Power Plant are oil-fueled electrical generating stations in Antilhue, Los Ríos Region, Chile. Both plants uses diesel as fuel; Antilhue I produces 50.9 MW of electricity, while Antilhue II produces 51.6 MW. The plants were built in 2005 and are run by Colbún S.A.
