= Nilahue River =

Coordinates: 40°15′26.33″S 72°15′3.61″W

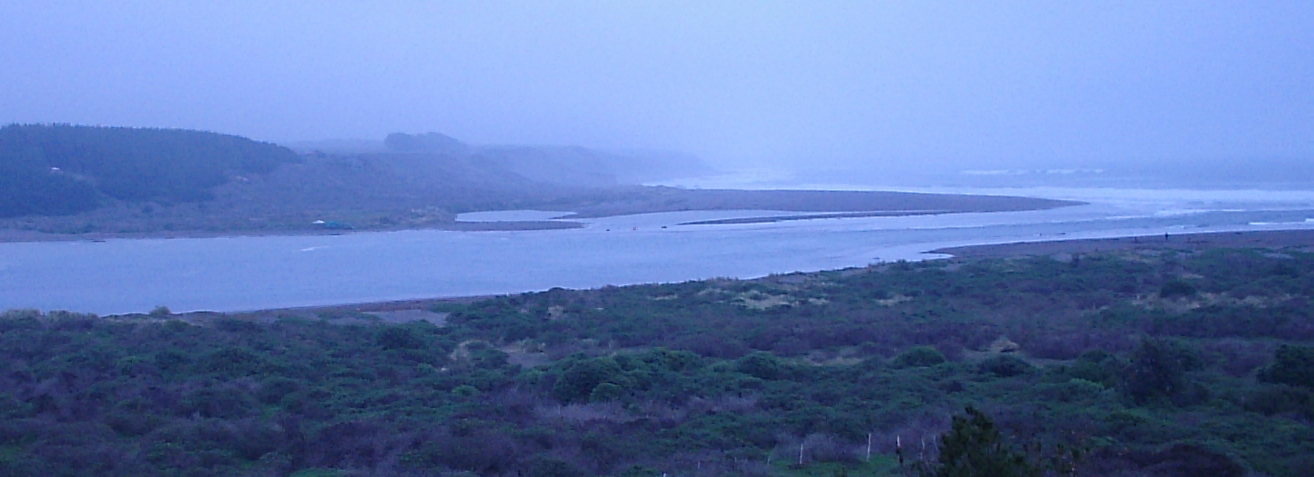
- View of Nilahue River near its mouth in Ranco Lake
- Native name: Río Nilahue (Spanish)

Location
- Country: Chile

Physical characteristics
- Source
  - location: Cordón Caulle
- Mouth
  - location: Ranco Lake
  - elevation: 70 m (230 ft)
- Length: more than 40 km (25 mi)

Nilahue River is an Andean river in Lago Ranco commune in south-central Chile.

Nilahue River originates in Cordón Caulle volcano and discharges into Ranco Lake, being its second largest tributary after Calcurrupe River. The catchment basin of the river receives water both from rainfall and from snow melt in the Cordón Caulle plateau. Los Baños hot springs are located on one of its upper tributaries. The rivers run a length of more than 40 km with the upper southern part running 20 km in north-south direction from Cordón Caulle to Carrán maar along the Liquiñe-Ofqui Fault. In the tectono-glacial valley that occupies the Liquiñe-Ofqui Fault Nilahue river runs along the western wall while a Contrafuerte River runs along the eastern wall before joining near Cerro La Overa. The northern lower portion runs from Carrán maar to Ranco Lake for another 20 km and features the Salto del Nilahue fall.

Ash from the 2011 Puyehue eruption contaminated this river and killed many fish. The area around the Nilahue River was evacuated on 10 June 2011 when the river overflowed its banks after it was blocked by volcanic ash and mounting debris. Temperatures in the river have risen by 113 °F (63 °C), with more than an estimated 4.5 million fish dead.

Nilahue River on the map
