= Lago Ranco =

Lago Ranco is a Chilean place name that may refer to:

- Ranco Lake Chile's fourth largest lake by surface area
- Lago Ranco, Chile a city and municipality in Chile in the lakeside of Ranco Lake
