= Pishuinco =

Coordinates: 39°48′23.91″S 73°3′20.93″W

- Interactive map of Pishuinco
- Region: Los Ríos
- Province: Valdivia
- Municipalidad: Valdivia
- Comuna: Valdivia

Government
  - Type: Municipalidad
  - Alcalde: Carla Amtmann

Population (2002 census )
  - Total: 228
- Time zone: UTC−04:00 (Chilean Standard)
  - Summer (DST): UTC−03:00 (Chilean Daylight)
- Area code: Country + town = 56 + 63

Pishuinco is a hamlet (Spanish: caserío) in the commune of Valdivia, Chile. It lies at the northern end of the Calle-Calle River between the city of Valdivia and Antilhue.
