= María José Gatica =

Chilean politician

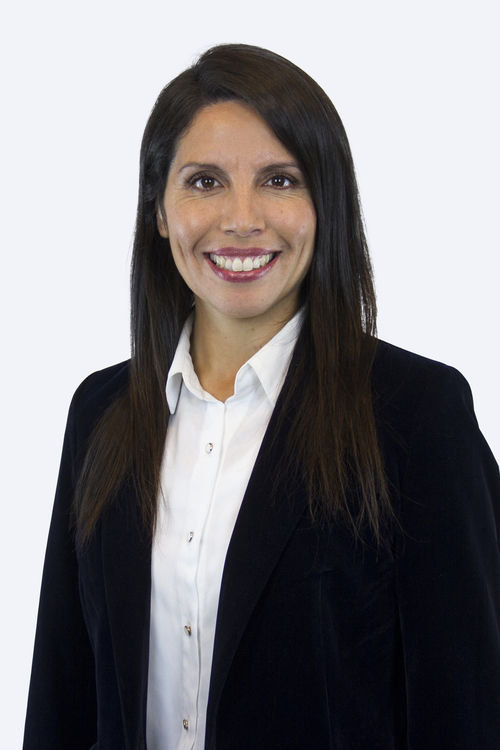

Member of the Senate
- Incumbent
- Assumed office 11 March 2022
- Preceded by: Creation of the circunscription
- Constituency: 12th Circunscription (Maule Region)

Governor of the Valdivia Province
- In office 11 March 2018 – 17 October 2019
- President: Sebastián Piñera
- Preceded by: Patricia Morano Buchner
- Succeeded by: Christian Cancino

Personal details
- Born: 15 April 1984 (age 42) Montevideo, Uruguay
- Party: National Renewal
- Spouse: Samuel Valenzuela
- Children: Three
- Parent(s): Gonzalo Gatica; Patricia Bertín
- Education: Austral University of Chile (BA)
- Occupation: Politician
- Profession: Civil Engineer

María José Gatica Bertin (born 15 April 1984) is a Chilean political figure and businesswoman. She has represented the Los Ríos Region in the Senate since 2022, after previously serving as a regional councilor for the same region between 2014 and 2021. A member of the centre-right party Renovación Nacional (RN), she is known for her positions on public security, decentralization, and economic development in southern Chile.

Gatica studied business administration at the University of Los Lagos, and later pursued specialization in local governance and public management. Before entering politics, she managed family enterprises in the tourism and service sectors in Valdivia, where she developed strong ties to local small and medium-sized businesses.

Her political career began with grassroots activism and party work in RN during the early 2010s. In 2013, she was elected regional councilor for Los Ríos Region, serving two terms (2014–2021), where she prioritized infrastructure, rural development, and improved healthcare access in isolated areas. In the 2021 Chilean general election, she won a seat in the Senate, becoming the first woman senator for her region.

== Biography ==
María José Gatica was born on 15 November 1979 in Valdivia, capital of the Los Ríos Region. She grew up in a middle-class family with strong roots in the local entrepreneurial and agricultural community. Her early life was marked by a strong interest in regional identity and community service, frequently participating in volunteer initiatives.

She studied at the Commercial Institute of Valdivia before enrolling in the University of Los Lagos, where she graduated with a degree in Business Administration. She completed further training in public administration and territorial development, and worked independently in the service industry before entering politics.

== Political career ==
Gatica's political involvement began through the youth wing of Renovación Nacional and later as a party organizer in Los Ríos Region. Her work in regional development led her to run for the Regional Council of Los Ríos, winning with strong support in rural communes.

During her tenure as regional councilor (2014–2021), she became known for her advocacy in favor of decentralized investment, particularly in connectivity, drinking water projects, and education access. She also served as vice-president of RN at the regional level, contributing to policy coordination between local authorities and national leadership.

In 2021, she ran for the Senate and was elected with broad support, becoming the first woman to represent Los Ríos Region in the upper chamber.

Her legislative priorities have included regional equity, police reform with a focus on rural security, and support for entrepreneurs in southern Chile. She has also advocated for permanent financing of firefighting services and promoted bills for improving road safety in rural territories.

She serves on the Senate commissions for Public Safety, Environment, and Decentralization, and is an active proponent of constitutional recognition for regional rights.
