= Flag of Los Ríos Region =

Regional flag of Los Ríos, Chile

Los Ríos
- Use: Civil and state flag, civil ensign
- Proportion: 2:3
- Adopted: 2009 (officially)

The flag of the Los Ríos Region is one of the regional symbols of the Chilean Los Ríos Region.

This emblem was officially adopted by the Regional Government on December 22, 2008, and was officially launched on August 7, 2009. It is one of three regional flags officially adopted in Chile (the other flags are from the Atacama and Magallanes regions).

The flag consists of a white background, above which are three wavy stripes yellow, green and blue, in top to bottom. These stripes are interrupted in the middle by a circle of twelve yellow stars.

The stars in a circle represent the twelve communes in the region. In turn, each strip represents a quality of the area. The yellow represents the life force, the green refers to the local nature and the blue water of rivers and lakes.
