= Lago Ranco, Chile =

Lago Ranco
- Town and commune
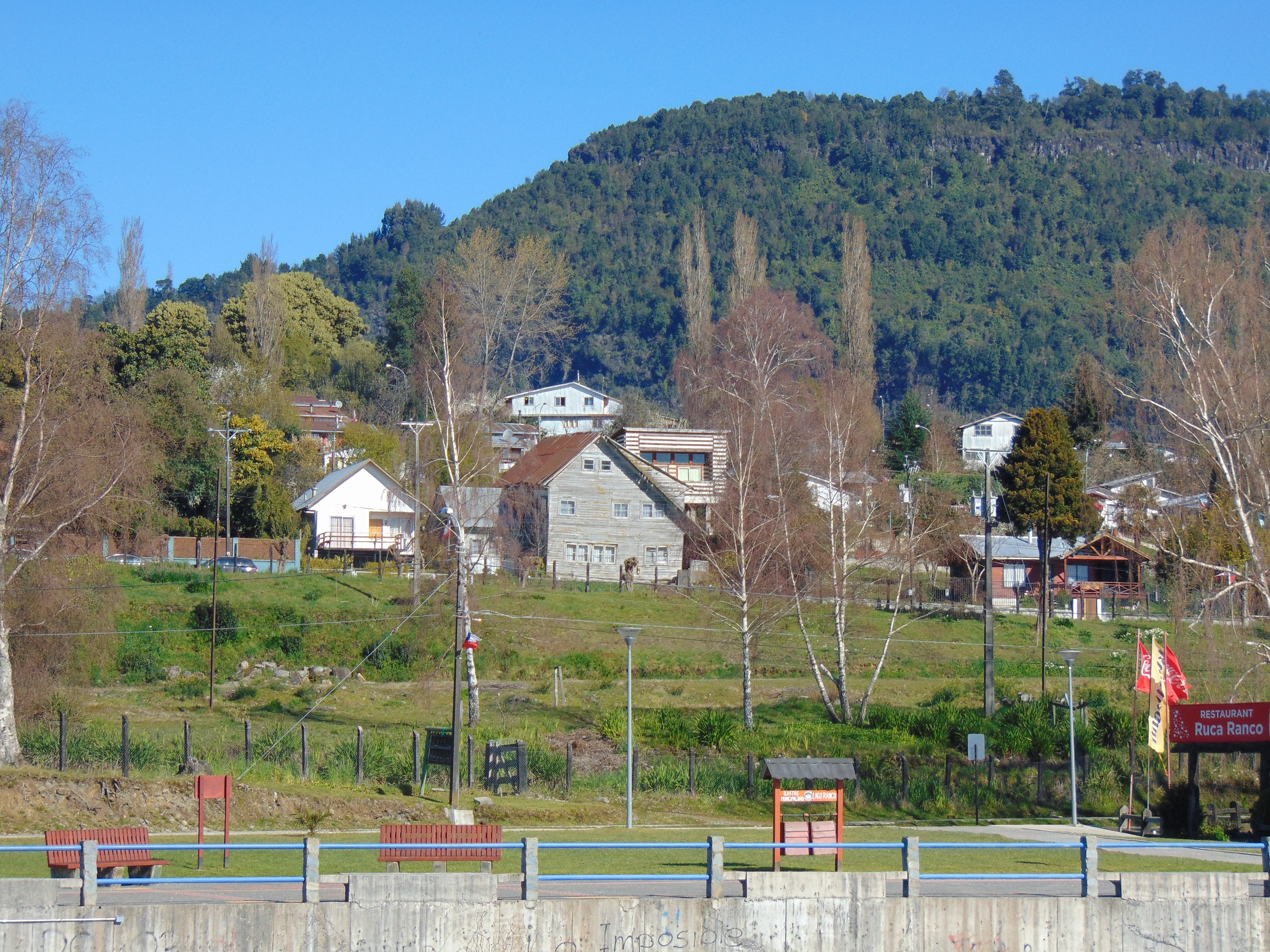

- Coat of arms Map of the Lago Ranco commune in the Los Ríos Region Location in Chile
- Coordinates (town): 40°19′S 72°30′W
- Country: Chile
- Region: Los Ríos
- Province: Ranco
- Lago Ranco: 14 February 1941

Government
  - Type: Municipality
  - Alcalde: Santiago Rosas Lobos (PDC)

Area
  - Total: 1,763.3 km^{2} (680.8 sq mi)
- Elevation: 64 m (210 ft)

Population (2012 Census)
  - Total: 9,575
  - Density: 5.430/km^{2} (14.06/sq mi)
  - Urban: 2,205
  - Rural: 7,893

Sex
  - Men: 5,295
  - Women: 4,803
- Time zone: UTC-4 (CLT)
  - Summer (DST): UTC-3 (CLST)
- Area code: 56 + 63
- Website: Municipality of Lago Ranco

Lago Ranco is a town and commune in southern Chile that is administered by the Municipality of Lago Ranco. It is located in the Ranco Province of the Los Ríos Region. Lago Ranco takes its name from Ranco Lake, which it shares with the commune of Futrono.

== History ==
The Ranco Lake basin was inhabited since ancient times by the Huilliche people (also known as the "people from the south"), who were characterized by a more peaceful region than that of the Mapuche. However, this was not the norm in other communities, as demonstrated by the great rebellion led by Toqui Pelantaru in 1599, which led to the destruction and abandonment of cities and forts built by the Spanish conquistadors south of the Bío-Bío.

Most of the life of the Huilliche communities in the area was spent in quiet, close contact with the natural environment that gave them their livelihood. Gathering, hunting, fishing, livestock, and incipient agriculture were the activities that allowed them to maintain their sedentary lifestyle and to develop certain cultural expressions.

During the colonial period, there was little change, as the area remained outside the territories of the colonization process. Only occasional attempts were made to integrate this area into colonial life, such as through the missionary work of the Jesuits from the fortifications of Quinchilca in the north and San José de Alcudia in the south, situated on the banks of the river well to the west of the lake.

The Huilliche communities in the area lived in the geographical setting of the Maihue and Ranco lacustrine basins, both lakes situated in the pre-Andean region and connected by the Calcurrupe River. This geographical landscape, which originated in the last glacial period, was inhabited by the early settlers of the Quaternary era. Each sector of this region was given a name that is still used today, such as Maihue, Curriñe, Chabranco, Hueinahue, and Rupumeica in the Maihue sector, and TRINGL, Ranco, Huapi, Calcurrupe, Llifén, Illahuapi, Pocuro, Riñinahue, Pitreño, Ilihue, Quillaico, Ignatieff, and Pitriuco in the Lago Ranco area.

During the Republican era in the nineteenth and twentieth centuries, the Chilean state promoted a process of settlement and integration of its various territories into the national order. However, the location of Lake Ranco in the pre-Andean sector was not an objective considered in this process, as the focus was primarily on the longitudinal valley and the coastal sector.

In 1846, the cartographer Bernardo Phillippi created a map of the province of Valdivia, which encompassed the departments of Valdivia and Osorno. Another historical record from the nineteenth century mentions that in 1885, the Department of Valdivia was subdivided into sub-delegations and districts. Sub-delegation No. 8 of Quinchilca was established, comprising the districts of Quinchilca, Riñihue, and Maihue. Maihue later served as the foundational land area for the future commune of Lago Ranco.

The first colonists arrived on the shores of Lake Ranco in the late nineteenth century, motivated to settle in the western sector of the lake, particularly in the areas of Hueimen and Ignatieff. The beauty and abundant resources of the native forests attracted these families. German colonists were among the early settlers who played a key role in the settlement of this region, fostering integration with the central valley and paving the way for further arrivals.

== Gesta Railroad ==
The construction of a railway between Cocula (southern sector of La Unión) and Lago Ranco began in 1928, and this project was initiated by the first settlers: Konust, Daniel, and Rettig, who, with a business vision, prompted this action. The branch was completed in the 1930s, and was at first only extended to Ignatieff, while work continue to resolve the section called "Return of the Guitar", at the height of Quillaico.

Once the railway was laid along its path, a slow settlement of the population began, engaged primarily in the work resulting from logging, which was the main economic activity of the time and the main objective of the railway. In the first instance, this town received the name of Punta de Rieles, and, later, by expansion into the hills, was renamed Pérez Rosales tringl, and then Llifén in honor of German colonization in the area. In 1935, the authorities prepared the first master plan for this fledgling town. In 1937, they ordered by decree the auction of public lands into subdivisions, which later gave rise to the town.

On February 14, 1941, under the government of Pedro Aguirre Cerda, Lago Ranco, was formally granted the status of a commune. Decree Law No. 6826 stated in article No. 1 stated: "Believe the commune sub-delegation of Lake Ranco, Department of Río Bueno. Its head is the village of Ranco Lake, located south of Lake Ranco." The respective decree also set the limits of the new commune and established the procedure for holding elections to form the new municipality.

With the creation of the commune in 1941, the slow process of urbanisation and community development began to intensify; since then communal like has been unfolding is communal life with the push of its authorities and citizens and with the support of central governments, as This has led to greater integration with neighboring communities, particularly the town of Rio Bueno.

Significant activity on the lake in 1947 reached a great climax. Several steamers plied the waters of Lake Ranco, covering different areas in a large area stretching from Puerto Rettig, and Ranco itself to Riñinahue, Llifén, Futrono, Isla Huapi, and Puerto Nuevo. An entire era was marked by dteamers such as the Laja, the Saturn, Osorno, Lili, and the Valdivia, going back and forth, bringing people and goods on the waters of Ranco, rarely troubled by the puihua. Several of them were destroyed by the force of black puelche. One of the major works undertaken in the commune was the building of the Liceo Antonio Varas, which concluded in 1960, and the stock of education certainly became a cornerstone of the municipality's development at the educational, social and cultural levels.

The force of nature, through its violent demonstrations, has not been absent during the twentieth century, and two major natural disasters are remembered: the eruption of Carran in 1955 and the 1960 earthquake, which caused concern and damage, later overcome. Another important milestone in the community's history was determined by the regionalization process initiated in 1974, which established the autonomy of the town of Lake Ranco, but, also resulted in the segregation of the Llifén eastern sector, which was integrated into the Futrono commune.

== Demographics ==
Historical population
Year	Pop.	±% p.a.
1952	11,504	—
1970	8,431	−1.71%
1982	9,862	+1.32%
1992	10,460	+0.59%
2002	10,098	−0.35%
2017	9,896	−0.13%
2024	10,527	+0.89%
Source: "Censo de Población y Vivienda". National Statistics Institute.

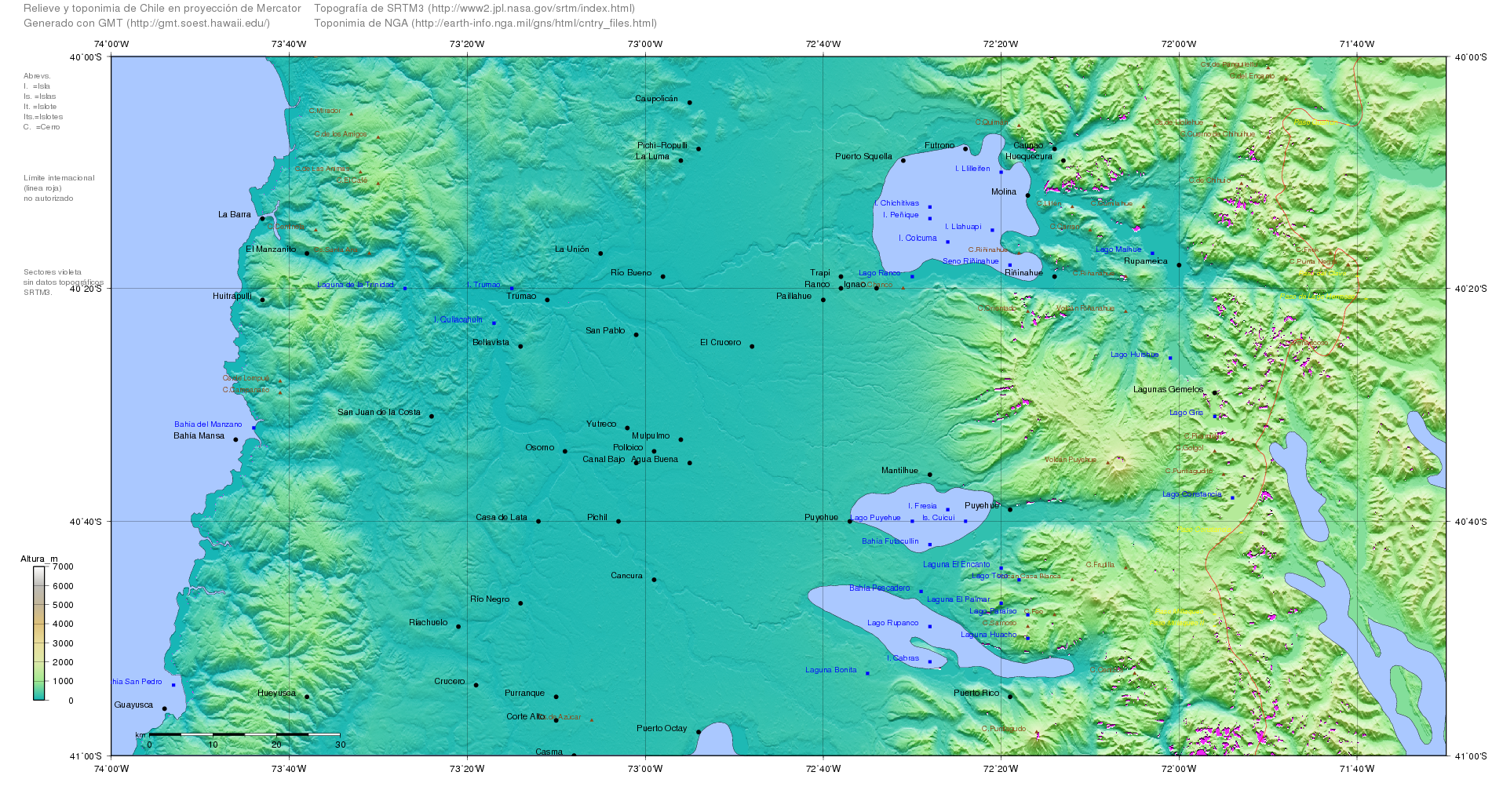
Zone of the Lago Ranco comune

According to the 2002 census of the National Statistics Institute, Lago Ranco spans an area of 1,763.3 km^{2} (681 sq mi) and has 10,098 inhabitants (5,295 men and 4,803 women). Of these, 2,205 (21.8%) lived in urban areas and 7,893 (78.2%) in rural areas. The population fell by 3.5% (362 persons) between the 1992 and 2002 censuses.

== Hydrography ==
The community of Lake Ranco has numerous streams, which belong to the Andean sector of the watershed of the Rio Bueno, an Andean valley with 17 210 km² and a distance of 130 km east–west. The Río Bueno receives many tributaries from the south bank, has a high rainfall regime, and shows characteristics of arushing mountain range with nival influence. The river system provides good natural drainage for Lake Ranco, which is 443 km² in areas, lies at 69 m elevation, and has a 199 m maximum depth. It is characterized by being the second largest lake in area within the territory of Chile. Water flows in from Lake Maihue with an area of 49 km² and from lake Huishue, which lies north of the Caulle cord. Also draining into Lake Ranco is the Riñinahue River, which rises near the Nevada Mountains, close to the limits of the Puyehue National Park.

The Buttress (Contrafuerte), Deer (Ciervo), and Nilahue rivers are born north of the Puyehue volcano, draining the central sector of the volcanic zone Puyehue–Carrán. Both the Buttress and Deer rivers join near the Carránvolcano, taking the name of the Nilahue River, which flows east of Lake Ranco. In the area of the Cordillera Nevada is born the Iculpe River, which empties into the southern shore of Lake Ranco, near the village of Lake Ranco.

Gray Lake is located in the southwest of the commune of Lake Ranco and within Puyehue National Park, with an approximate area of 9 km² and an elevation of 1,000 meters. The lake gives rise to the White River, which joins the RíoChol Chol, the latter originating from the Laguna Twins. These rivers flow into Lake Huishue. Also flowing into Lake Huishue is the stream La Virgin, which is born northwest of Lake Gray.

== Weather ==
Three types of very different climates can be found in Lago Ranco: the so-called rainy temperate climate with Mediterranean influence (Cfsb) mountain weather (G) and icy climate caused by the effect of height (EFH).

The first type of climate is develops between the Pre-Andean Middle Range surrounding the Central Depression. It is not characterized by a dry season, as rainfall occurs throughout the year, although some features of a break appear during the warm season. In this temperate rainforest, there are no large temperature swings. This is facilitated by the liquid surface of Lake Ranco, which prevents frost on its banks. During the spring and summer there is a persistent cloudiness that tends to dissipate by noon, which is known as the South negro.

The mountain climate is evident in the Andes, in some sectors of the foothills. It is above the curve at 500 m, a height corresponding approximately to the development of the 5 °C isotherm in the coldest month, and this is also the elevation where tree-like vegetation appears due to low temperatures.

The third type of climate that occurs in the commune of Lake Ranco is the icy climate caused by the effect of height, which appears in high mountain areas, where the elevation exceeds 3,000 m. The conditions in such sectors range from a climate of tundra with no trees, to a climate of perpetual snow without vegetation, depending on increasing altitude.

The community of Lake Ranco is characterized by rainfall throughout the year. The average annual rainfall reaches Lake Ranco reaches 2,020 mm, while in the lake Maihue it is 4,072 mm. This shows that precipitation increases as height increases, resulting in increased rainfall in the commune in its eastern sector.

In the commune, averages temperatures decrease towards the east, however, there are large areas close to the lake where temperatures are conditioned by the thermal moderating effect. The mean maximum and minimum temperatures are recorded annually in the months of January and July. Temperatures in Lago Ranco range between 3 and 20 °C, and in lake Maihue between 0 and 18 °C. The municipality has no dry months, but the most affected by this natural phenomenon are February for Lake Ranco and December for lake Maihue.

In the commune of Lake Ranco, winds prevail from the northwest, southwest, and west. In addition, winds are typical, such as the Puigua or Puelche throughout the commune, which dry the air in the summer and cause storms in winter.

== Fauna ==
The fauna is closely related to the vegetation existing in the area, called the Valdivian rainforest, which is characterized by a high proportion of endemic species. However, many of these species are in danger of extinction due to anthropogenic factors. The most common mammals in these forests are the monito del monte, the pudú, whose preferred habitat is the forest and ulmo-coihue stands, the puma in the south, living in the mountain range, the gray fox, the coypu in the south, which is located in wetlands and swamps, and the wild cat, and other introduced species like the hare.

With regard to birds, the most notable are the Chucao, the Huet hued, the wood pigeon, the Choroy, the Magellanic Carpenter and the southern Partridge, among others.

Among insects, the most notable are the Stag Beetle, the Beetle of the Moon, the Mother of the Snake, and the Horse of the Devil. As for the fish, there are native and introduced species, which are a major attraction for sport fishing. The most abundant native fish are puye, carmelita, percatrucha, zebra trout, and mackerel of the river, and among the introduced species are rainbow trout, brook trout, brown trout and European trout.

== Administration ==
As a commune, Lago Ranco is a third-level administrative division of Chile administered by a municipal council, headed by an alcalde who is directly elected every four years. The 2008-2012 alcalde is Santiago Rosas Lobos (PDC). He was preceded by Santiago Rosas Lobos (2004–2008).

Within the electoral divisions of Chile, Lago Ranco is represented in the Chamber of Deputies by Enrique Jaramillo (PDC) and Gastón von Mühlenbrock (UDI) as part of the 54th electoral district, together with Pangipulli, Los Lagos, Futrono, Río Bueno, La Unión and Paillaco. The commune is represented in the Senate during the 2014–2022 period by Alfonso de Urresti (PS) and Ena von Baer (UDI) as part of the 16th senatorial constituency of the Los Ríos Region.

== Business ==
The primary economic activities in Lago Ranco are agriculture and forestry, tourism, and services. With regard to the agriculture and forestry sector, according to an agroclimatic study conducted in the district, much of it does not have a high potential for agricultural activities, except around Lake Ranco. Moreover, the climate allows for all crops typical of the area, except in places where soil constraints permit only natural grasslands. In the commune the terrain is dominated by mountainous areas, and only about 4.2% is suitable for agriculture.

According to the agroclimatic diagnosis conducted, Lago Ranco has predominantly forest potential due to the agro-ecological characteristics of the soil and the existence of abundant reserves of native forests and young plantations of exotic species. The activity is performed at a primary operation level and is characterized by an extraction process without processing timber for other more technological centers.

On a smaller scale is the livestock and agricultural sector, which consists of smallholder farmers who use a minimal operating system, with limited technology and focused specifically on the cultivation of traditional items such as wheat and potatoes, which are normally used for household consumption, with family labor. There are also fewer medium-sized farmers, who use more manpower and more technology.

Besides the activities described above, the town of Lake Ranco has significant potential for tourism and for increased economic activity within this sector, since the community is located within the Lake Ranco area, which is part of the Andean Lake Tourist Zone, a tourist area in the process of consolidation by the Tourism Development Master Plan of the Lake District, together with the great beauty of the area with its natural attractions, plus the history and cultural identity that characterise the commune.

It is also established as part of the destination "Cuenca del Lago Ranco," in conjunction with the municipalities of Rio Bueno, Paillaco, Futrono and La Union.
