= Volcanism of Chile =

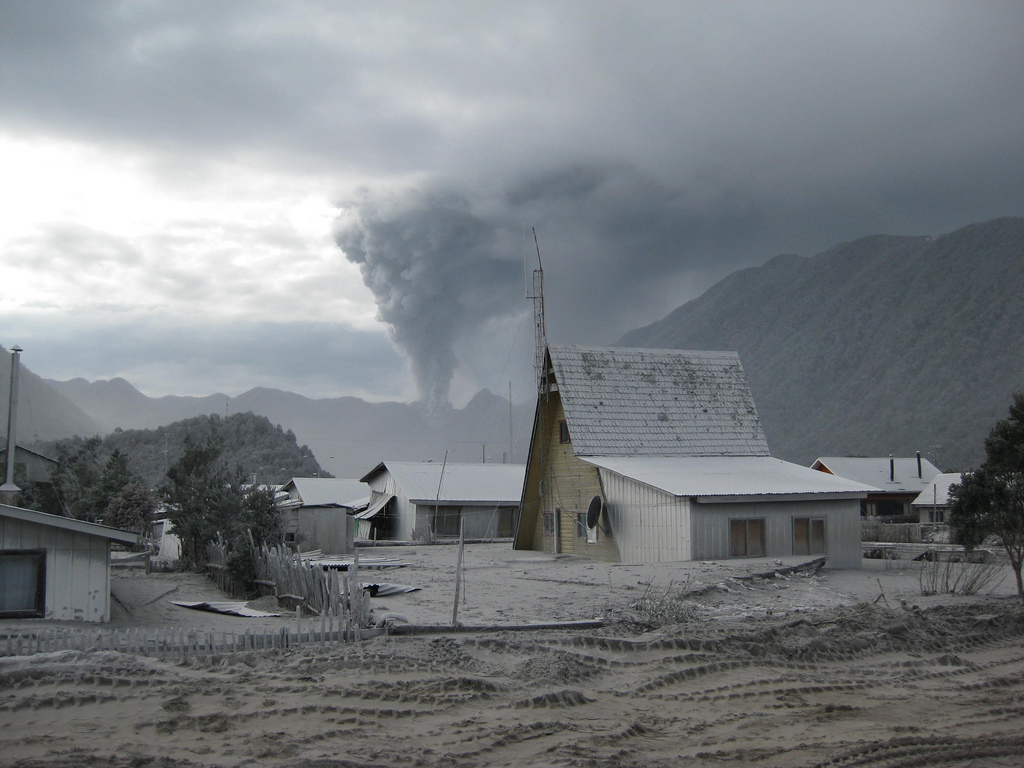
Following the eruption of the Chaitén volcano, a lahar destroyed much of the town of Chaitén.

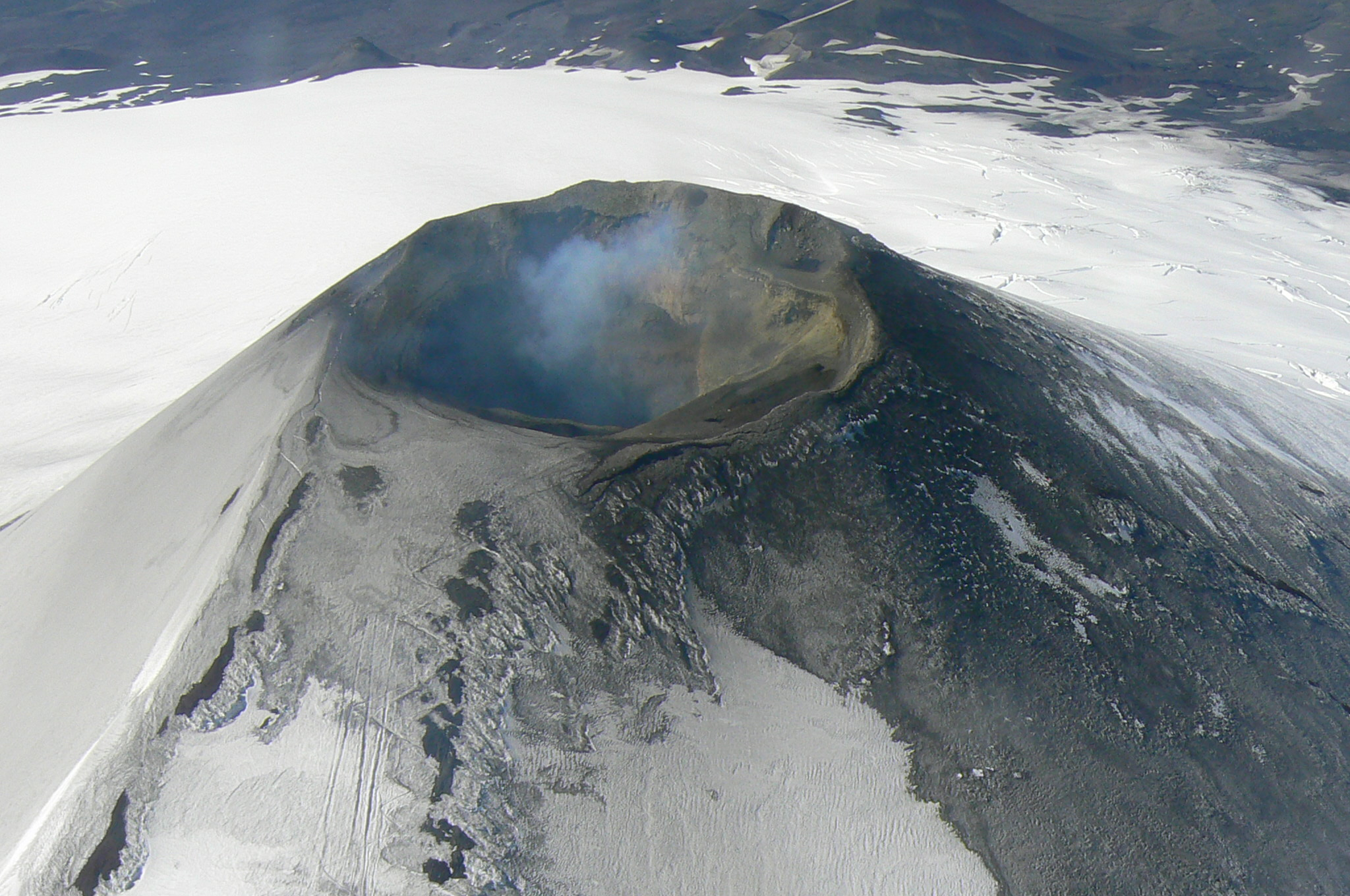
Aerial view of the peak of Mount Villarrica

Volcanism of Chile is a continuous volcanic process that has a strong influence on Chilean landscape, geology, economy and society. Volcanism constantly renews the Chilean landscape with lava flows, lava plateaus, lava domes, cinder cones, stratovolcanoes, shield volcanoes, submarine volcanoes, calderas, diatremes, and maars. Volcanism in Chile as well as in other parts of the world is also associated with multiple natural hazards such as lahars, earthquakes, pyroclastic flows, toxic gases and ash. Continental Chile has a high concentration of active volcanoes due to its location along the Peru–Chile Trench, a subduction zone where the Nazca and Antarctic Plates are driven beneath the South American Plate. Chile has been subject to volcanism since at least late Paleozoic when subduction along the western margin of South America began. Easter Island, Juan Fernández Islands and other oceanic islands of Chile are extinct volcanoes created by hotspots. The Servicio Nacional de Geología y Minería (SERNAGEOMIN) is the statutory agency of the Government of Chile which is responsible for volcano monitoring and hazard assessments. SERNAGEOMIN runs a national Volcano Hazards Program, along with the Observatorio Volcanológico de Los Andes del Sur (OVDAS). The territories of Chile have 92 volcanoes that are considered potentially active, 60 of which have had recorded eruptions in the last 450 years. The volcanoes with most recorded eruptions are:

- Llaima (8)
- Villarrica (6)
- Antuco Volcano (4)
- Planchón-Peteroa (3)
- Lonquimay (3)
- Calbuco (3)

== See also ==
- Geology of Chile
- List of volcanoes in Chile
