= Cooperativa Agrícola y Lechera de La Unión Limitada =

Chilean dairy cooperative

- Company type: Agricultural marketing cooperative
- Industry: Processed Dairy Goods
- Founded: 24 June 1949; 76 years ago La Unión, Chile (1949)
- Area served: Worldwide
- Key people: Juan Carlos Zwanzger Larre (President); Lionel Mancilla Lausic (General Manager)
- Products: Dairy Products, milk, cheese
- Members: 730+
- Number of employees: 1,300
- Website: www.colun.cl

Cooperativa Agrícola y Lechera de La Unión Limitada (COLUN or Colún) is a Chilean dairy cooperative company based in La Unión, Chile. As of 2011, Colún is the second largest dairy company in Chile after Soprole.

== History ==
The cooperative was founded on June 24, 1949, by Francisco Hoch and Juan Fischer, bringing together 70 dairy farmers from the area. In its early days, during its development phase, the company produced only butter for the central region market. While the market sold it in 18-kilo blocks, Colun reduced the size, making quarter-kilo packages. Later, it began distributing powdered milk in cans and bags, as well as cheeses, products that could be shipped far from the plant without altering their characteristics. In 1954, Colun created the Commercial Department to improve the management of each member's farms and livestock. Colun made its first export in 1986, sending 240 kg of cheese to Brazil, and that same year inaugurated its headquarters across from Plaza de la Concordia in La Unión. Two years later in 1988 it would be the first dairy industry to introduce sliced cheese in Chile and that same year it launched the Manjar Colun campaign which achieved a strong impact.
