= Los Llanos, Chile =

Los Llanos (Spanish for The Plains) is a historical term for the flatland area encompassing the Chilean Central Valley between Valdivia and Osorno. It includes parts of the communes of Paillaco, La Unión, Río Bueno, Osorno and San Pablo.
