= Huahum River =

Coordinates: 40°06′19″S 71°40′11″W

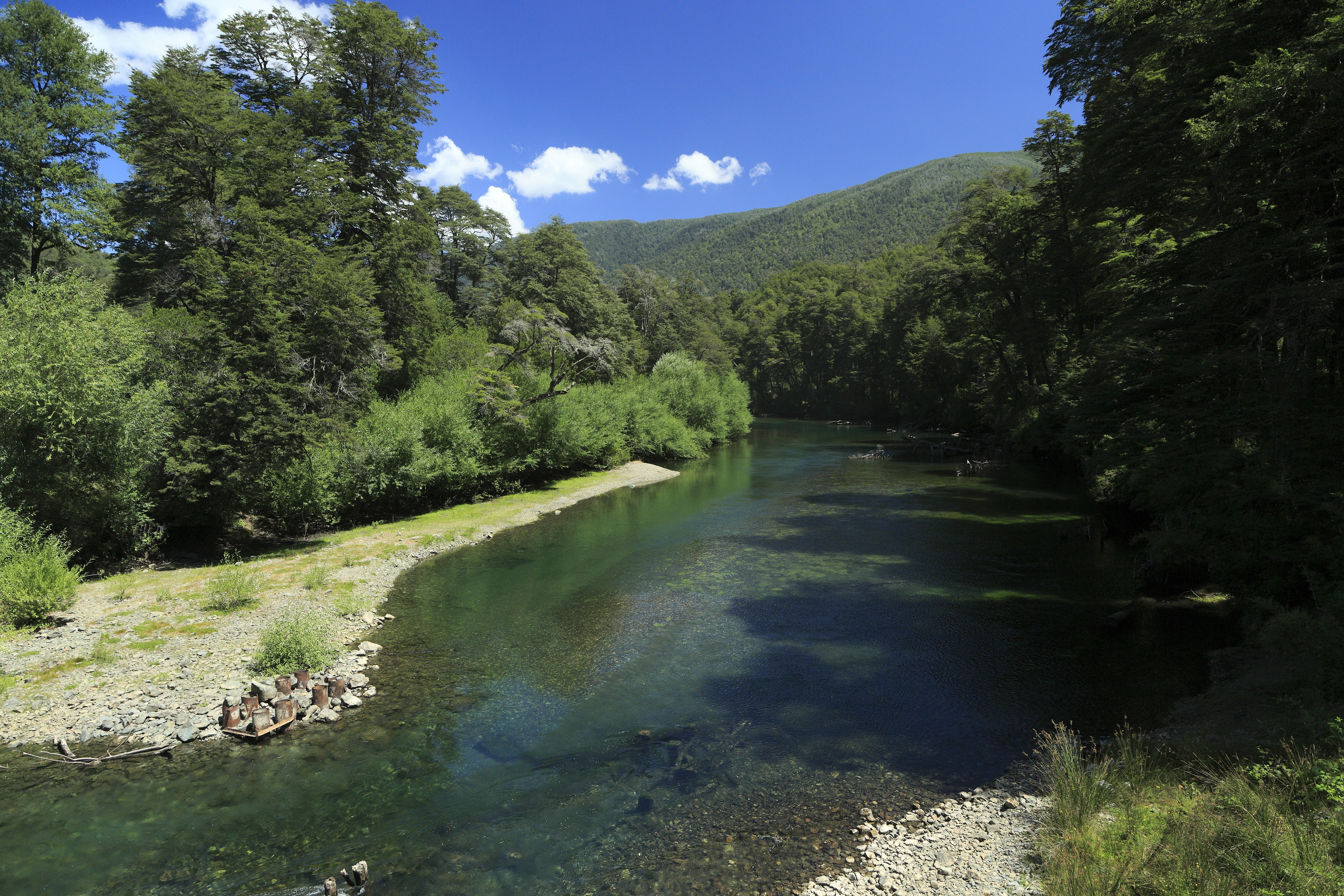
- Native name: Río Huahum (Spanish)

Location
- Countries: Chile; Argentina

Physical characteristics
- Source
  - location: Lácar Lake
- Mouth
  - location: Pirihueico Lake

The Huahum River (Spanish: Río Huahum [waˈum]), also spelled as Guahun, Huahun, or Hua-Hum, is a river in southern Chile and Argentina. It drains the waters of Lácar Lake in Argentina to Pirihueico Lake in Chile. The river gives name to Huahum Pass, an international mountain pass on the border between Chile and Argentina.

Huahum River on the map
