= Quinchilca =

Christian mission in Chile

Coordinates: 39.85294246°S 72.74545835°W

Quinchilca is a mission located east of city of Los Lagos, Chile. Quinchilca was once one of the many missions built around Valdivia to evangelize the native Huilliche people.
