= Lilpela Pass =

- Interactive map of Lilpela Pass
- Elevation: c. 1400 m

Location
- Location: Argentina–Chile border
- Range: Andes
- Coordinates: 40°09′59″S 71°48′59″W

Ipela or Lilpela (Spanish: Paso Lilpela) is a mountain pass through the Andes along the border between Chile and Argentina. It is most notable for being the pass used by Pablo Neruda to flee from Chile in 1949 due to the Cursed Law. The pass is not outfitted as an international border crossing. During summer months, Carabineros guard the entrance to the pass close to Chabranco.
