= Cordillera Negra (Chile) =

Mountain range in the Andes

Highest point
- Elevation: 1,550 m (5,090 ft)
- Coordinates: 39°59′52″S 72°14′05″W

Dimensions
- Length: 15 km (9.3 mi) east-west

Geography
- Country: Chile
- Parent range: Andes

Cordillera Negra is a Chilean mountain range It runs perpendicular to the Andes in an east-west direction from Mocho-Choshuenco volcano to Cerros de Quimán. The range has several features of the Quaternary glaciation periods including cirques and arêtes.
