= Lanco, Chile =

Lanco
- City and Commune
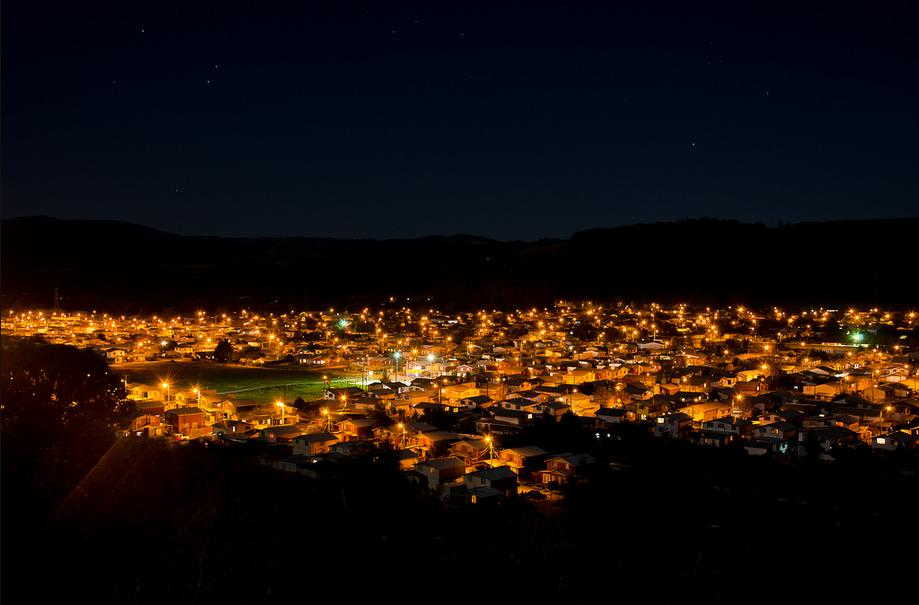
- Lanco at night

- Coat of arms

- Map of Lanco commune in Los Rios Region

- Location in Chile
- Coordinates (city): 39°27′S 72°47′W
- Country: Chile
- Region: Los Rios
- Province: Valdivia
- Established: Lanco
- Founded: 28 December 1917

Government
  - Type: Municipality
  - Alcalde: Luis Cuvertino Gómez (PS)

Area
  - Total: 532.4 km^{2} (205.6 sq mi)
- Elevation: 62 m (203 ft)

Population (2012 Census)
  - Total: 15,836
  - Density: 29.74/km^{2} (77.04/sq mi)
  - Urban: 10,383
  - Rural: 4,724

Sex
  - Men: 7,415
  - Women: 7,692
- Time zone: UTC−4 (CLT)
  - Summer (DST): UTC−3 (CLST)
- Area code: 56 + 63
- Climate: Cfb
- Website: Municipality of Lanco

Lanco is a city and commune in southern Chile administered by the Municipality of Lanco. It is located in Valdivia Province in Los Ríos Region, about 69 km (43 mi) northeast of Valdivia by road, close to Cruces River.

== Demographics ==
Historical population
Year	Pop.	±% p.a.
1875	1,782	—
1885	2,155	+1.92%
1895	3,718	+5.61%
1907	7,765	+6.33%
1920	10,768	+2.55%
1930	14,670	+3.14%
1940	27,488	+6.48%
1952	13,717	−5.63%
1970	12,962	−0.31%
1982	12,901	−0.04%
1992	13,757	+0.64%
2002	15,107	+0.94%
2017	16,752	+0.69%
2024	18,050	+1.07%
Source: "Censo de Población y Vivienda". National Statistics Institute.

According to the 2002 census of the National Statistics Institute, Lanco spans an area of 532.4 km^{2} (206 sq mi) and has 15,107 inhabitants (7,415 men and 7,692 women). Of these, 10,383 (68.7%) lived in urban areas and 4,724 (31.3%) in rural areas. Between the 1992 and 2002 censuses, the population grew by 9.8% (1,350 persons).

== Transport ==
The highway Chile Route 5 passes by Lanco.

== Administration ==
As a commune, Lanco is a third-level administrative division of Chile administered by a municipal council, headed by an alcalde who is directly elected every four years. The 2008-2012 alcalde is Luis Cuvertino Gómez (PS).

Within the electoral divisions of Chile, Lanco is represented in the Chamber of Deputies by Alfonso De Urresti (PS) and Roberto Delmastro (RN) as part of the 53rd electoral district, together with Valdivia, Mariquina, Máfil and Corral. The commune is represented in the Senate during the 2014–2022 period by Alfonso de Urresti (PS) and Ena von Baer (UDI) as part of the 16th senatorial constituency (Los Ríos Region).
