= Lácar Lake =

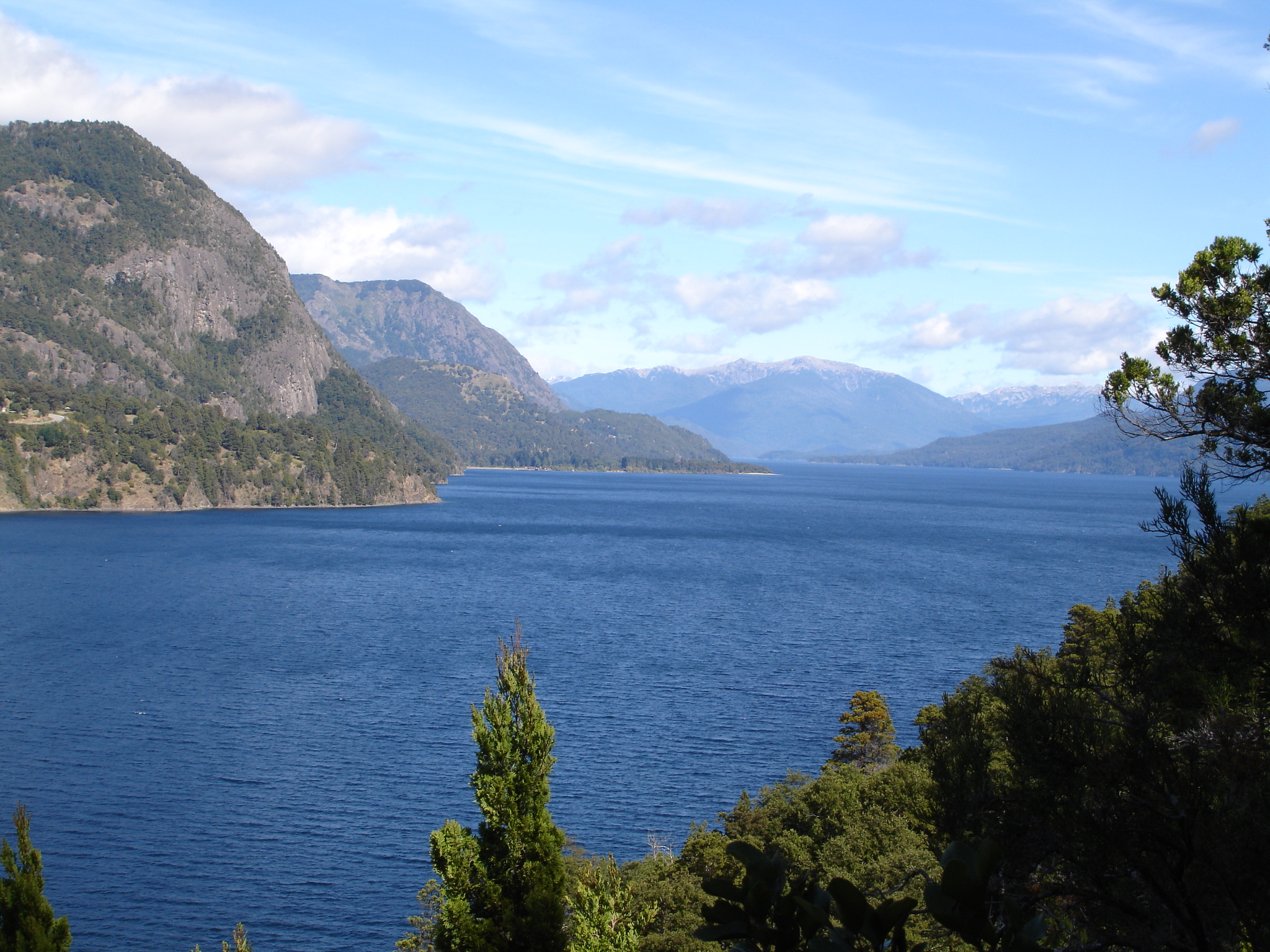

- Location within Argentina
- Location: Lácar Department, Neuquén Province
- Coordinates: 40°11′S 71°32′W
- Type: glacial lake
- Primary outflows: Huahum River
- Catchment area: 1,048 km^{2} (405 sq mi)
- Basin countries: Argentina
- Surface area: 55 km^{2} (21 sq mi)
- Average depth: 167 m (548 ft)
- Max. depth: 277 m (909 ft)
- Water volume: 9.19 km^{3} (2.20 cu mi)
- Surface elevation: 630 m (2,070 ft)
- Settlements: San Martín de los Andes

Lácar Lake (Spanish: Lago Lácar) is a lake of glacial origin in Neuquén Province, Argentina. It is enclosed in the Andes mountain range, at 630 m (2,070 feet) above mean sea level. The area around the lake is mostly uninhabited, except for the city of San Martín de los Andes on its northeastern coast. The lake has a surface area of 55 km^{2} (21 sq mi) and a mean depth of 167 m (548 feet), with a maximum of 277 m (909 feet). Its catchment basin comprises 1,048 km^{2} (405 sq mi). Like many Andean Argentine lakes, it drains across Chile and into the Pacific Ocean, in this case via the Huahum River that flows through Huahum Pass in the Andes. As the northernmost lake on the eastern side of Andes that drains to the Pacific the lake and its catchment basin were claimed by Chile until 1902 based on an interpretation of the Boundary treaty of 1881 between Chile and Argentina. The lake, along with the smaller lake nearby, Lolog, has some sacred significance for the Mapuche people, as it features in their oral tradition as part of a creation myth. Large sections of the lake's shores are made of cliffs.

The dominant species of plankton in the lake is Aphanocapsa elachista.
