= Chile Route 203 =

Highway in Chile

Route 203
- Ruta 203
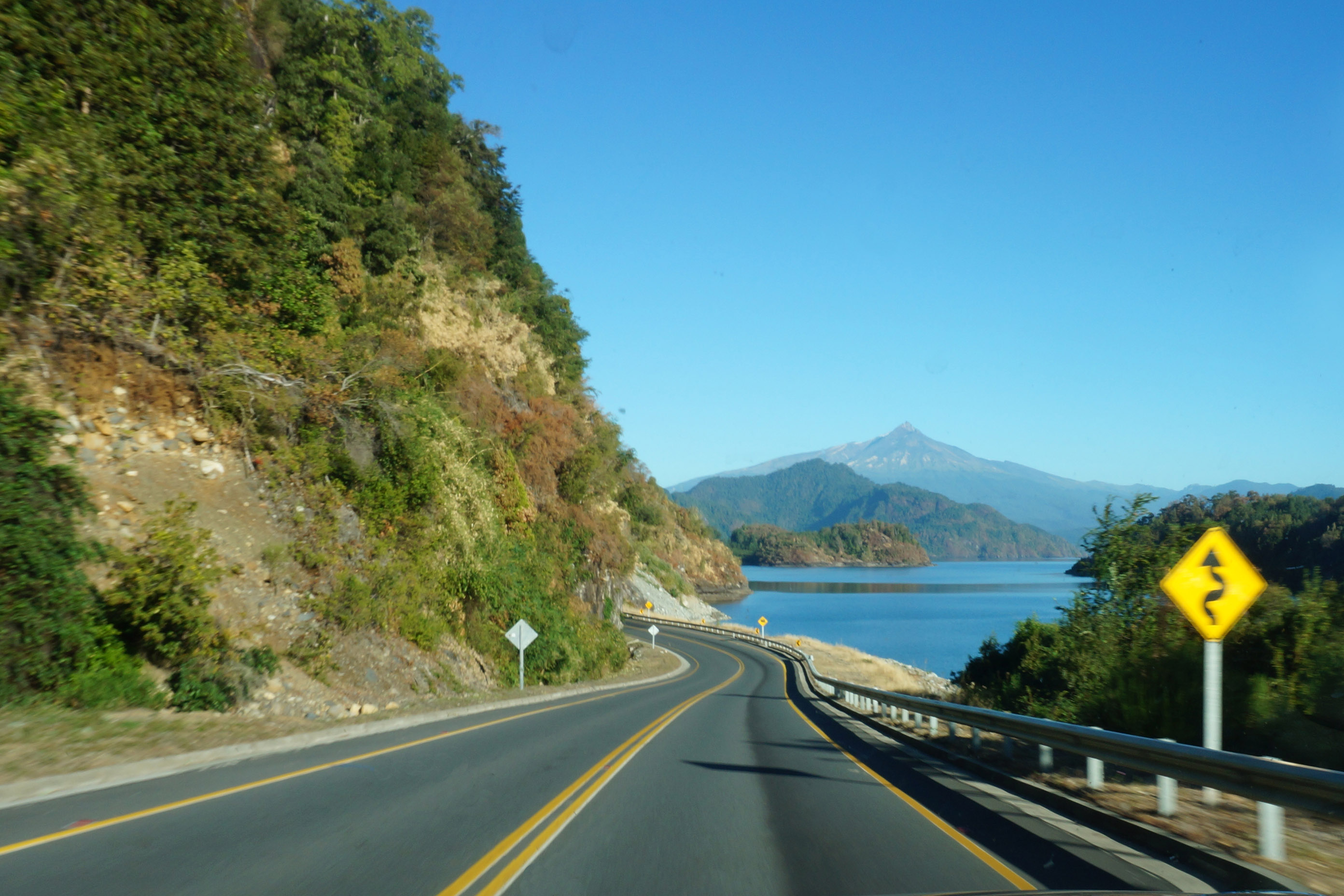
- Route 203-CH passing along the northern shores of Panguipulli Lake.

Location
- Country: Chile

Highway system
- Highways in Chile

International Route 203-CH is a branch line road going eastward from Lanco at Chile Highway 5 to Huahum Pass at the border to Argentina. Some settlements along the road includes: Lanco, Malalhue, Panguipulli and Neltume. The road is paved from Lanco to the north side of Panguipulli Lake where it becomes a gravel road.
