= Hua Hum Pass =

International mountain pass in the Andes

Hua Hum
- Hua Hum Pass on the top right of the map
- Interactive map of Hua Hum
- Elevation: 685 metres (2,247 ft)

Third Approach
- Location: Argentina–Chile border
- Range: Andes
- Coordinates: 40°06′19″S 71°40′11″W

Hua Hum Pass (Spanish: Paso Hua Hum [waˈum]) is an international mountain pass in the Andes between Chile and Argentina. The pass takes its name from the Hua Hum River that flows from Argentina into Chile at the site of the border crossing. Even though the pass does not go through the continental divide, it crosses the highest peaks of the cordillera.

== Geography ==
The Hua Hum Pass is one of the lowest passes of the southern Andes at 685 meters above sea level, which means that unlike other nearby Chile-Argentina passes it never closes due to snow fall and is open year-round. The pass is used primarily for tourism as the Chilean 203-CH road is interrupted by Pirihueico Lake. A ferry equipped to transport vehicles as well as people may be taken to Puerto Fuy, on the other side of Pirihueico Lake. The ferry ride lasts approximately 2 hours.

It is the main pass of the Chilean Los Ríos Region to Neuquén Province in Argentina. The main cities on both sides of the pass are Panguipulli in Chile and San Martín de los Andes (45 km from the pass in Argentina).
