= Río Bueno, Chile =

Río Bueno
- City and Commune
- Flag Coat of arms Location of the Río Bueno commune in Los Ríos Region Location in Chile
- Coordinates (city): 40°19′S 72°58′W
- Country: Chile
- Region: Los Ríos
- Province: Ranco
- Founded as: Río Bueno
- Founded: 1778

Government
  - Type: Municipality
  - Alcalde: Luis Reyes Alvarez (UDI)

Area
  - Total: 2,211.7 km^{2} (853.9 sq mi)
- Elevation: 43 m (141 ft)

Population (2012 Census)
  - Total: 31,366
  - Density: 14.182/km^{2} (36.731/sq mi)
  - Urban: 15,054
  - Rural: 17,573

Sex
  - Men: 16,418
  - Women: 16,209
- Time zone: UTC−4 (CLT)
  - Summer (DST): UTC−3 (CLST)
- Area code: 56 + 63
- Website: Municipality of Río Bueno

Río Bueno is a city and commune in southern Chile administered by the Municipality of Río Bueno. It is located in Ranco Province in Los Ríos Region. Río Bueno takes its name from the Bueno River which flows through the city and commune. Rio Bueno is one of the better rivers to fish.

== Demographics ==
Historical population
| Year | Pop. | ±% p.a. |
|---|---|---|
| 1875 | 4,255 | — |
| 1885 | 6,742 | +4.71% |
| 1895 | 7,536 | +1.12% |
| 1907 | 14,027 | +5.31% |
| 1920 | 17,701 | +1.81% |
| 1930 | 23,845 | +3.02% |
| 1940 | 34,387 | +3.73% |
| 1952 | 25,613 | −2.42% |
| 1970 | 28,428 | +0.58% |
| 1982 | 31,786 | +0.93% |
| 1992 | 32,981 | +0.37% |
| 2002 | 32,627 | −0.11% |
| 2017 | 31,372 | −0.26% |
| 2024 | 33,363 | +0.88% |
Source: "Censo de Población y Vivienda". National Statistics Institute.

According to the 2002 census of the National Statistics Institute, Río Bueno spans an area of 2,211.7 km^{2} (854 sq mi) and has 32,627 inhabitants (16,418 men and 16,209 women). Of these, 15,054 (46.1%) lived in urban areas and 17,573 (53.9%) in rural areas. Between the 1992 and 2002 censuses, the population fell by 1.1% (354 persons).

== Administration ==
As a commune, Río Bueno is a third-level administrative division of Chile administered by a municipal council, headed by an alcalde who is directly elected every four years. The 2008-2012 alcalde is Luis Reyes Alvarez (UDI).

Within the electoral divisions of Chile, Río Bueno is represented in the Chamber of Deputies by Enrique Jaramillo (PDC) and Gastón von Mühlenbrock (UDI) as part of the 54th electoral district, together with Panguipulli, Los Lagos, Futrono, Lago Ranco, La Unión and Paillaco. The commune is represented in the Senate during the 2014–2022 period by Alfonso de Urresti (PS) and Ena von Baer (UDI) as part of the 16th senatorial constituency (Los Ríos Region).

== Climate ==
Climate data for Río Bueno
| Month | Jan | Feb | Mar | Apr | May | Jun | Jul | Aug | Sep | Oct | Nov | Dec | Year |
|---|---|---|---|---|---|---|---|---|---|---|---|---|---|
| Mean daily maximum °C (°F) | 23.7 (74.7) | 23.6 (74.5) | 20.9 (69.6) | 17.0 (62.6) | 13.5 (56.3) | 11.0 (51.8) | 10.8 (51.4) | 12.1 (53.8) | 14.2 (57.6) | 17.7 (63.9) | 19.4 (66.9) | 21.2 (70.2) | 17.1 (62.8) |
| Daily mean °C (°F) | 16.5 (61.7) | 16.0 (60.8) | 14.0 (57.2) | 11.2 (52.2) | 8.9 (48.0) | 7.4 (45.3) | 7.0 (44.6) | 7.4 (45.3) | 8.7 (47.7) | 11.2 (52.2) | 12.8 (55.0) | 14.6 (58.3) | 11.3 (52.4) |
| Mean daily minimum °C (°F) | 9.2 (48.6) | 8.6 (47.5) | 7.8 (46.0) | 6.2 (43.2) | 4.9 (40.8) | 4.3 (39.7) | 3.6 (38.5) | 3.4 (38.1) | 3.8 (38.8) | 5.4 (41.7) | 6.7 (44.1) | 8.3 (46.9) | 6.0 (42.8) |
| Average precipitation mm (inches) | 44.4 (1.75) | 44.3 (1.74) | 69.9 (2.75) | 109.1 (4.30) | 193.0 (7.60) | 192.3 (7.57) | 172.3 (6.78) | 132.7 (5.22) | 110.4 (4.35) | 56.4 (2.22) | 60.0 (2.36) | 50.5 (1.99) | 1,235.3 (48.63) |
| Average relative humidity (%) | 75 | 75 | 75 | 79 | 83 | 86 | 88 | 87 | 82 | 82 | 81 | 78 | 81 |
Source: Bioclimatografia de Chile

Río Bueno on the map
