= Los Lagos, Chile =

Los Lagos
- City and Commune
- Coat of arms Location of the Los Lagos commune in Los Rios Region Location in Chile
- Coordinates (city): 39°51′S 72°50′W
- Country: Chile
- Region: Los Rios
- Province: Valdivia
- Founded as: Quinchilca
- Founded: 22 December 1891

Government
  - Type: Municipality
  - Alcalde: Samuel Torres Sepúlveda (Ind.)

Area
  - Total: 1,791.2 km^{2} (691.6 sq mi)
- Elevation: 31 m (102 ft)

Population (2002 Census)
  - Total: 20,168
  - Density: 11.259/km^{2} (29.162/sq mi)
  - Urban: 9,479
  - Rural: 10,689

Sex
  - Men: 10,370
  - Women: 9,798
- Time zone: UTC−4 (CLT)
  - Summer (DST): UTC−3 (CLST)
- Area code: 56 + 63
- Website: Municipality of Los Lagos

Los Lagos (Spanish pronunciation: [los ˈlaɣos]) is a Chilean city and commune in Valdivia Province, Los Ríos Region. San Pedro River passes by the city.

== Demographics ==
Historical population
| Year | Pop. | ±% p.a. |
|---|---|---|
| 1875 | 3,034 | — |
| 1885 | 3,288 | +0.81% |
| 1895 | 5,470 | +5.22% |
| 1907 | 5,603 | +0.20% |
| 1920 | 9,079 | +3.78% |
| 1930 | 14,738 | +4.96% |
| 1940 | 22,618 | +4.38% |
| 1952 | 18,570 | −1.63% |
| 1970 | 15,364 | −1.05% |
| 1982 | 17,651 | +1.16% |
| 1992 | 18,564 | +0.51% |
| 2002 | 20,168 | +0.83% |
| 2017 | 19,634 | −0.18% |
| 2024 | 20,520 | +0.63% |
Source: "Censo de Población y Vivienda". National Statistics Institute.

According to the 2002 census of the National Statistics Institute, Los Lagos spans an area of 1,791.2 km^{2} (692 sq mi) and has 20,168 inhabitants (10,370 men and 9,798 women). Of these, 9,479 (47%) lived in urban areas and 10,689 (53%) in rural areas. The population grew by 8.6% (1,604 persons) between the 1992 and 2002 censuses.

It has a large German presence, like the entire Los Rios and Los Lagos Regions.

== Administration ==
As a commune, Los Lagos is a third-level administrative division of Chile administered by a municipal council, headed by an alcalde who is directly elected every four years. The 2008-2012 alcalde is Samuel Torres Sepúlveda (Ind.).

Within the electoral divisions of Chile, Los Lagos is represented in the Chamber of Deputies by Enrique Jaramillo (PDC) and Gastón von Mühlenbrock (UDI) as part of the 54th electoral district, together with Panguipulli, Futrono, Lago Ranco, Río Bueno, La Unión and Paillaco. The commune is represented in the Senate during the 2014–2022 period by Alfonso de Urresti (PS) and Ena von Baer (UDI) as part of the 16th senatorial constituency (Los Ríos Region).
