= La Unión, Chile =

La Unión
- city and commune
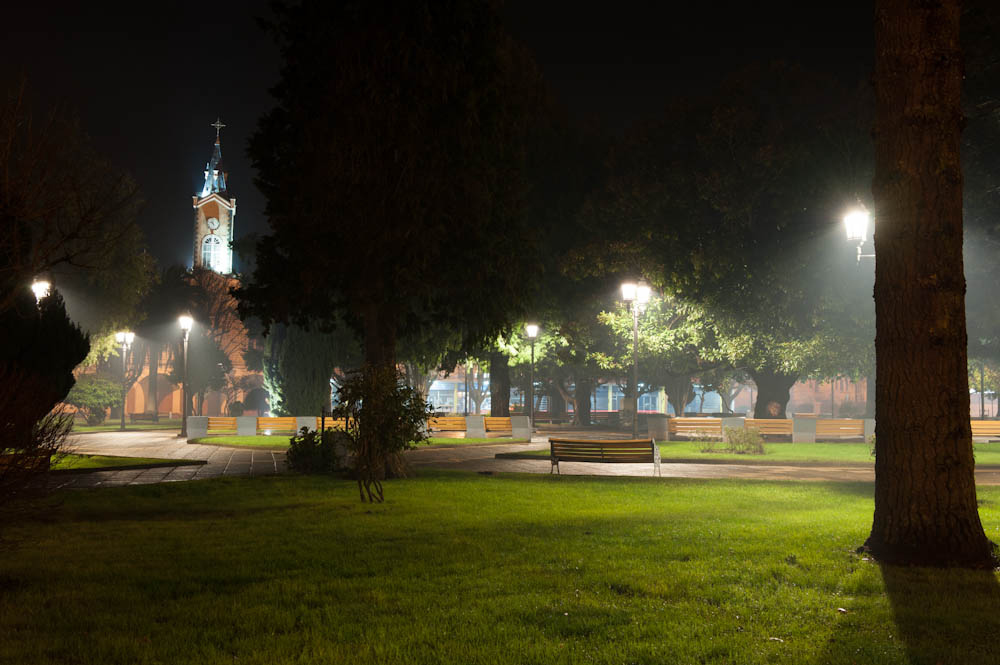
- Plaza de la Concordia, La Unión

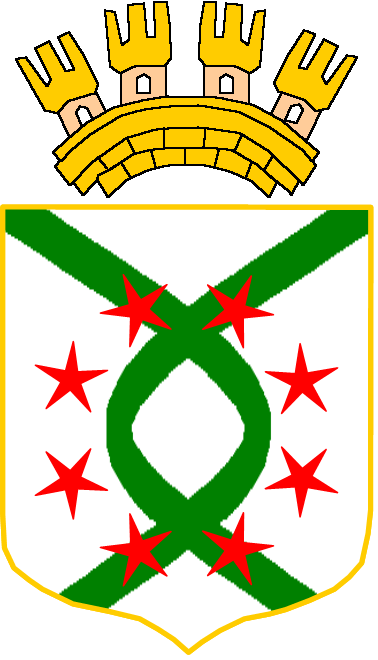
- Flag Coat of arms Location of La Unión commune in Los Ríos Region Location in Chile
- Coordinates (city): 40°17′S 73°5′W
- Country: Chile
- Region: Los Ríos
- Province: Ranco
- Founded as: Villa de San José de La Unión
- Founded: 13 February 1821

Government
  - Type: Municipality
  - Alcalde: Aldo Pinuer Solís

Area
  - Total: 2,136.7 km^{2} (825.0 sq mi)
- Elevation: 28 m (92 ft)

Population (2012 census)
  - Total: 36,447
  - Density: 17.058/km^{2} (44.179/sq mi)
  - Urban: 25,615
  - Rural: 13,832
- Demonym: unionino

Sex
  - Men: 20,125
  - Women: 19,322
- Time zone: UTC−4 (CLT)
  - Summer (DST): UTC−3 (CLST)
- Area code: 56 + 63
- Climate: Cfb
- Website: Official website (in Spanish)

La Unión is a city and commune (Note: Formerly a department.) of the Ranco Province in the Los Ríos Region in Chile. It is situated approximately 40 km north of Osorno and 80 km southeast of Valdivia. Covering an area of 2,136.7 km^{2}, it has a population of 36,447, of which 25,615 are considered part of the urban population, according to the 2012 census. The commune derived its name from the confluence of the Llollelhue and Radimadi rivers.

La Unión was founded in 1821 during the government of Bernardo O'Higgins, to secure sovereignty over the Central Valley south of Valdivia. It is a major centre for milk production; COLUN is the main milk and dairy product producer in the zone. The commune is covered in forest to the west of the city and the east is dominated by agricultural landscapes spanning Los Llanos. Alerce Costero National Park lies in the western mountains.

The city served until 2001 as a dormitory town for the coal mines of Catamutún.

== Demographics ==
Historical population
Year	Pop.	±% p.a.
1875	6,717	—
1885	8,729	+2.65%
1895	10,031	+1.40%
1907	14,278	+2.99%
1920	18,887	+2.18%
1930	20,453	+0.80%
1940	21,164	+0.34%
1952	25,061	+1.42%
1970	32,140	+1.39%
1982	35,324	+0.79%
1992	38,740	+0.93%
2002	39,447	+0.18%
2017	38,036	−0.24%
2024	38,907	+0.32%
Source: "Censo de Población y Vivienda". National Statistics Institute.

According to the 2002 census of the National Statistics Institute, La Unión spans an area of 2,136.7 km^{2} (825 sq mi) and has 39,447 inhabitants (20,125 men and 19,322 women). Of these, 25,615 (64.9%) lived in urban areas and 13,832 (35.1%) in rural areas. The population grew by 1.8% (707 persons) between the 1992 and 2002 censuses.

== Administration ==
As a commune, La Unión is a third-level administrative division of Chile administered by a municipal council, headed by an alcalde who is directly elected every four years. The 2012-2016 alcalde is María Angelica Astudillo Mautz.

Within the electoral divisions of Chile, La Unión is represented in the Chamber of Deputies by Mr. Enrique Jaramillo (PDC) and Mr. Gastón von Mühlenbrock (UDI) as part of the 54th electoral district, together with Panguipulli, Los Lagos, Futrono, Lago Ranco, Río Bueno and Paillaco. The commune is represented in the Senate during the 2014–2022 period by Alfonso de Urresti (PS) and Ena von Baer (UDI) as part of the 16th senatorial constituency (Los Ríos Region).

== Education ==
Deutsche Schule La Unión was at one time recognized as an overseas German school by the West German government.
