= Ena von Baer =

Chilean journalist, political scientist and former senator

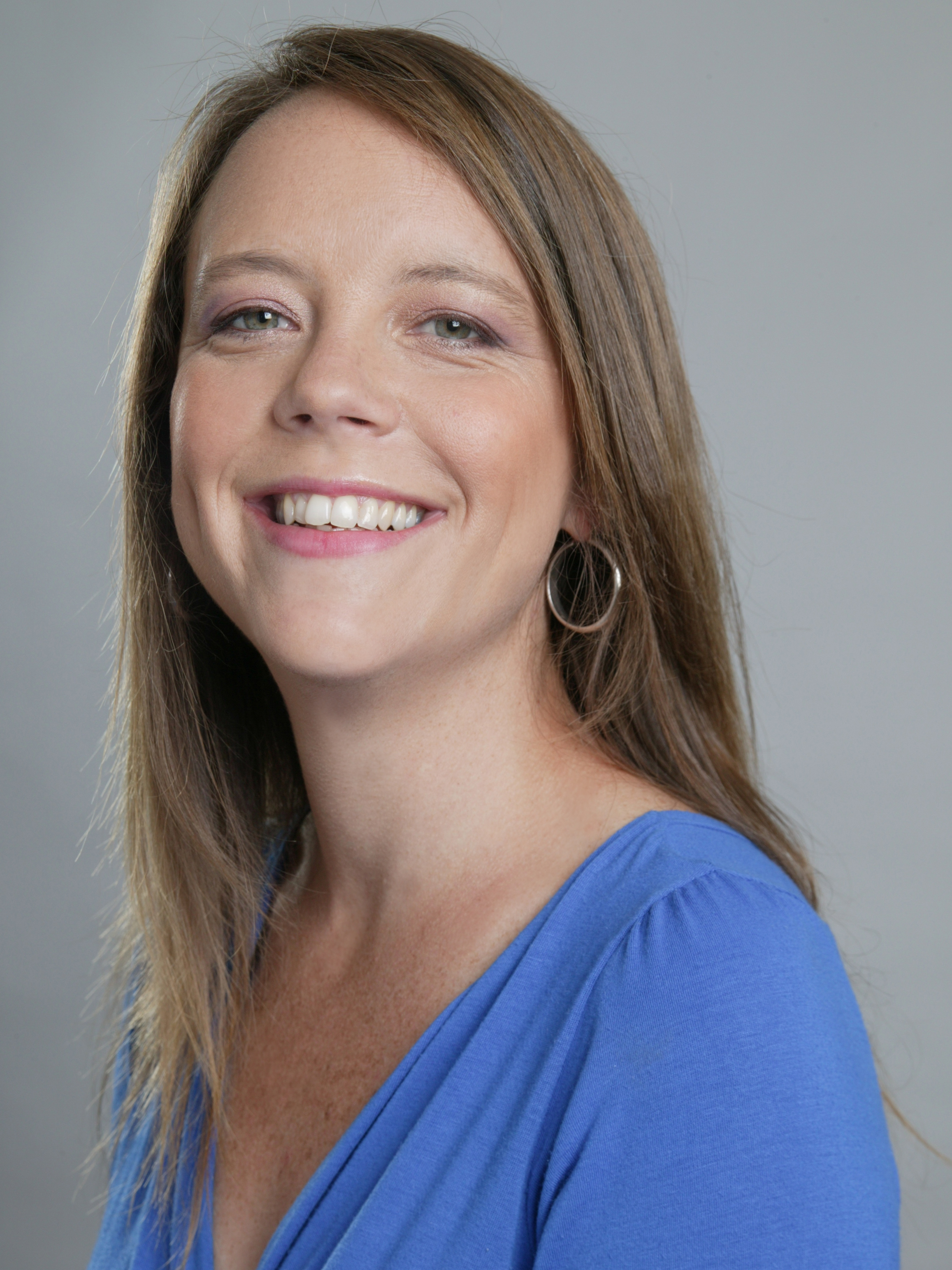

Senator of the Republic
- In office 10 March 2014 – 11 March 2022
- Preceded by: Carlos Larraín
- Succeeded by: María José Gatica
- In office 2 August 2011 – 11 March 2014
- Preceded by: Pablo Longueira
- Succeeded by: Manuel José Ossandón

Minister Secretary-General of Government
- In office 11 March 2010 – 18 July 2011
- Preceded by: Pilar Armanet
- Succeeded by: Andrés Chadwick

Personal details
- Born: 28 November 1974 (age 51) Temuco, Chile
- Party: Independent Democrat Union (UDI)
- Spouse: Eduardo Fröhlich
- Children: Two
- Education: Pontifical Catholic University of Chile; University of Aachen, Germany
- Occupation: Journalist, Political scientist, Politician
- Website: Pinera2010.cl

Ena Anglein von Baer Jahn (born 28 November 1974 in Temuco) is a Chilean journalist, political scientist and former senator.

In December 2009, von Baer lost a very tight race for a seat in the Senate. In March 2010 she became Minister Secretary-General of Government. In July 2011 she was designated senator, replacing Pablo Longueira, who left the senate to become Minister of Economy.

Prior to her work in the government, von Baer was a panelist on a televised political show and worked for the think tank Instituto Libertad y Desarrollo.

== Biography ==
Von Baer was born on 28 November 1974 in Temuco, Chile to Erik von Baer, an agricultural engineer who was born in Brandenburg, Germany and moved from Germany to central Chile with his parents and brother in 1949, and Helga Jahn, a descendant of German settlers who arrived in Angol during 19th century; she is third among 4 sisters (Ingrid, Karina and Sybille). Upon her return to Chile in 2002, von Baer worked as researcher for the political science department at Libertad y Desarrollo, a think tank. She then served as the Academic Director of the School of Government in the Adolfo Ibáñez University, a position which she later abandoned in order to return to LyD as Director of its Social and Political Program. She dedicated her work to research into political systems and electoral studies, and to developing social politics related to poverty and indigenous peoples. She also worked as a legislative advisor, especially in the subject of automatic electoral enrollment and voluntary vote. During the same time, she was a professor at the Faculty of Government at the University for Development and a panelist on a program of Televisión Nacional de Chile, Estado Nacional.

== Political career ==
On 9 February 2010, President Piñera named von Baer as Minister Secretary-General of Government. She took office on 11 March 2010. At the president's request, she resigned in July, 2011. A few days later, she was designated as senator.

In 2011 von Baer was used as an example of someone in the government with family members who have acquired the patents for crops and will benefit from the privatisation of seed.

For the 2013 parliamentary election she first intended run as senator for the same district she was representing -Santiago Oriente. However the Independent Democratic Union (UDI) assigned instead Laurence Golborne as their candidate there. Von Baer was however allowed a slot by UDI to run for Circunscripción Nº 16, Los Ríos Region, where she was actually elected. Her campaign was financed by SOQUIMICH and was actually the parliament election campaign that spent most money per vote obtained in that election in the whole of Chile.

== Bibliography ==
- Von Baer, Ena. Die Rolle der Vergangenheitsbewältigung im Systemwechsel (Fallbeispiel Chile) [The Role of Coming to Terms with the Past in System Change (Case Study Chile)] (in German). Dr. Müller. ISBN 3-8364-2618-8.
