= Futrono =

(Futrono) Futronhue
- City and Commune
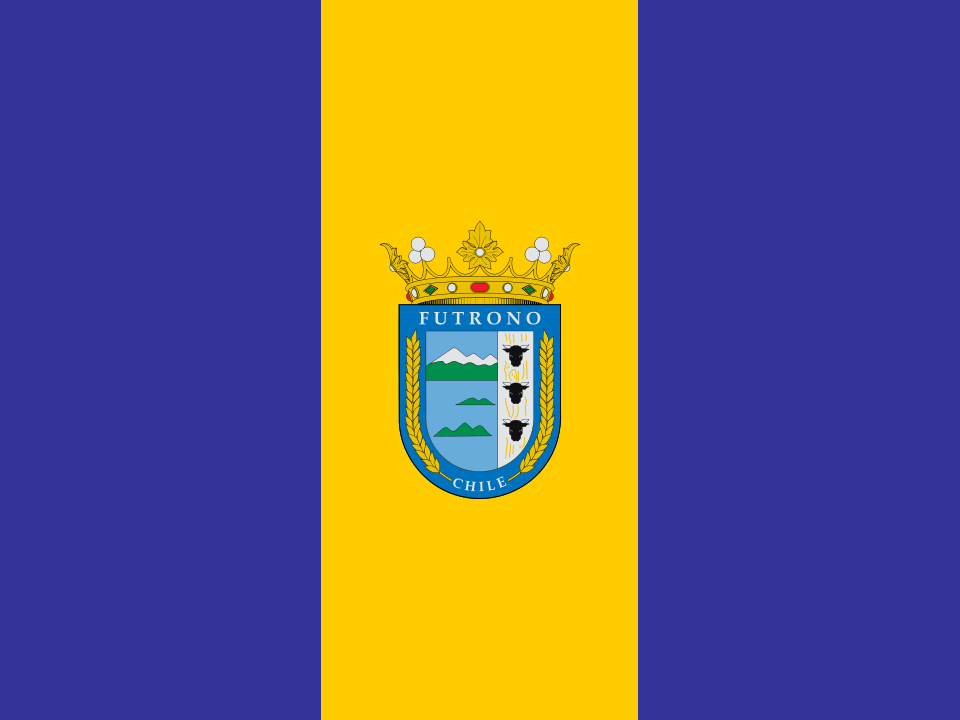
- Flag Coat of arms Map of the Futrono commune in Los Ríos Region Location in Chile
- Coordinates (city): 40°08′S 72°24′W
- Country: Chile
- Regions of Chile: Los Ríos
- Province: Ranco
- Founded as: Futrono
- Founded: 12 June 1941

Government
  - Type: Municipality
  - Alcalde: Jorge Guillermo Tatter Oñate (UDI)

Area
  - Total: 2,120.6 km^{2} (818.8 sq mi)
- Elevation: 67 m (220 ft)

Population (2012 Census)
  - Total: 13,736
  - Density: 6.4774/km^{2} (16.776/sq mi)
  - Urban: 8,399
  - Rural: 6,582

Sex
  - Men: 7,647
  - Women: 7,334
- Time zone: UTC−4 (CLT)
  - Summer (DST): UTC−3 (CLST)
- Area code: 56 + 63
- Website: www.municipalidadfutrono.cl

Futrono (from the Mapudungun: Futronhue, meaning "place of smoke") is a city and commune in southern Chile administered by the Municipality of Futrono. It is located in Ranco Province in Los Ríos Region, on the northwest shore of Ranco Lake.

== Demographics ==
Historical population
Year	Pop.	±% p.a.
1952	7,392	—
1970	10,722	+2.09%
1982	12,261	+1.12%
1992	14,048	+1.37%
2002	14,981	+0.65%
2017	14,665	−0.14%
2024	15,635	+0.92%
Source: "Censo de Población y Vivienda". National Statistics Institute.

According to the 2002 census of the National Statistics Institute, Futrono spans an area of 2,120.6 km^{2} (819 sq mi) and has 14,981 inhabitants (7,647 men and 7,334 women). Of these, 8,399 (56.1%) lived in urban areas and 6,582 (43.9%) in rural areas. The population grew by 6.6% (933 persons) between the 1992 and 2002 censuses.

== Administration ==
As a commune, Futrono is a third-level administrative division of Chile administered by a municipal council, headed by an alcalde who is directly elected every four years. The 2008-2012 alcalde is Jorge Guillermo Tatter Oñate (UDI).

Within the electoral divisions of Chile, Futrono is represented in the Chamber of Deputies by Enrique Jaramillo (PDC) and Gastón von Mühlenbrock (UDI) as part of the 54th electoral district, together with Panguipulli, Los Lagos, Lago Ranco, Río Bueno, La Unión and Paillaco. The commune is represented in the Senate during the 2014–2022 period by Alfonso de Urresti (PS) and Ena von Baer (UDI) as part of the 16th senatorial constituency (Los Ríos Region).

Map with Futrono on north shore of Lago Ranco (upper center).
