= El Ranco =

El Ranco Province Provincia del Ranco
- Province
- Seal

- Location in the Los Ríos Region

- Location in Chile
- Coordinates: 40°20′S 72°30′W
- Country: Chile
- Region: Los Ríos
- Capital: La Unión
- Communes: List of 4: Futrono; La Unión; Río Bueno; Lago Ranco

Government
  - Type: Provincial
  - Governor: Alsono Pérez de Arce Carrasco (EVOP)

Area
  - Total: 8,232.3 km^{2} (3,178.5 sq mi)

Population (2012 Census)
  - Total: 91,656
  - Density: 11.134/km^{2} (28.836/sq mi)
  - Urban: 51,273
  - Rural: 45,880

Sex
  - Men: 49,485
  - Women: 47,668
- Time zone: UTC-4 (CLT)
  - Summer (DST): UTC-3 (CLST)
- Area code: 56 + 63
- Website: Government of El Ranco

El Ranco Province (Spanish: Provincia del Ranco) is one of two provinces of the southern Chilean region of Los Ríos. It is named after Ranco Lake shared by the communes (comunas) of Futrono and Lago Ranco. The lake is drained by the Bueno River, on which basin lies most of the province. La Unión is the provincial capital.

== Administration ==
As a second-level administrative division, the province comprises four communes, each with its own governing municipality. Alsono Pérez de Arce Carrasco is the provincial governor.

=== Communes ===
- Futrono
- Lago Ranco
- La Unión
- Río Bueno

== Geography and demography ==
According to the 2002 census by the National Statistics Institute (INE), the province spans an area of 8,232.3 km^{2} (3,179 sq mi) and had a population of 97,153 inhabitants (49,485 men and 47,668 women), giving it a population density of 11.8/km^{2} (31/sq mi). Of these, 51,273 (52.8%) lived in urban areas and 45,880 (47.2%) in rural areas. Between the 1992 and 2002 censuses, the population grew by 1% (924 persons).
