= Los Ríos Region =

Los Ríos Region Región de Los Ríos
- Region
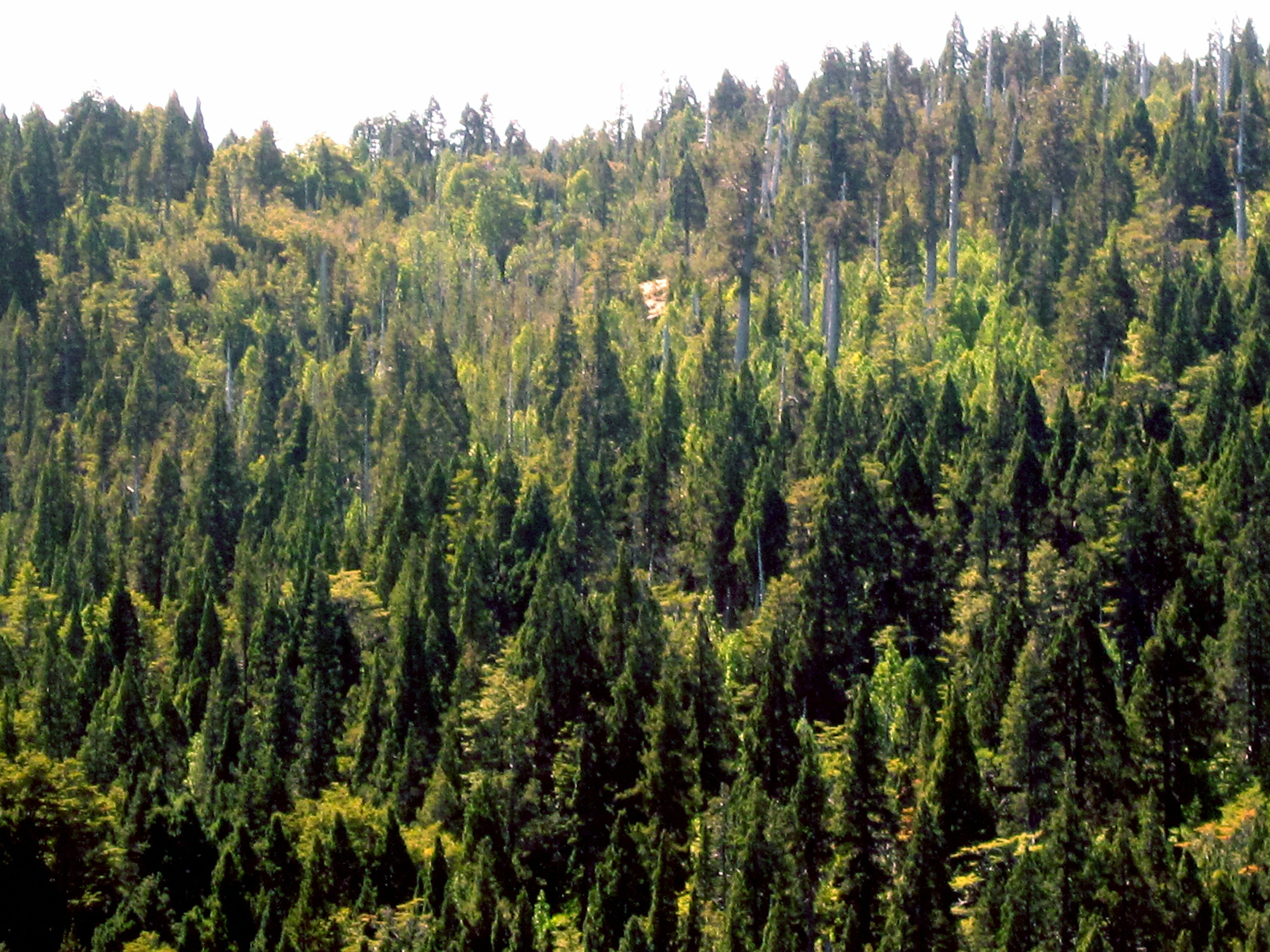
- Alerce Costero National Park

- Flag Seal Coat of arms

- Map of Los Ríos Region
- Coordinates: 39°48′30″S 73°14′30″W
- Country: Chile
- Capital: Valdivia
- Provinces: Valdivia, Ranco

Government
  - Intendant: César Asenjo (UDI)

Area
  - Total: 18,429.5 km^{2} (7,115.7 sq mi)
  - Rank: 11th in Chile
- Highest elevation: 2,236 m (7,336 ft)
- Lowest elevation: 0 m (0 ft)

Population (2024)
  - Total: 398,230
  - Rank: 11th in Chile
  - Density: 21.608/km^{2} (55.965/sq mi)

GDP (PPP)
  - Total: $4.703 billion (2014)
  - Per capita: $11,711 (2014)
- ISO 3166 code: CL-LR
- HDI (2022): 0.803 high
- Website: Official website

The Los Ríos Region (Spanish: Región de Los Ríos, pronounced [los ˈri.os], lit. Region of the Rivers) is one of Chile's 16 regions, the country's first-order administrative divisions. Its capital is Valdivia. It began to operate as a region on October 2, 2007, having been created by subdividing the Los Lagos Region in southern Chile. It consists of two provinces: Valdivia and the newly created El Ranco Province, which was formerly part of Valdivia Province.

== Economy ==
The region's main economic sector is the wood industry, mainly in timber harvesting from insignis pine and eucalyptus and pulp processing. Animal husbandry, the industrial sector and tourism are also of note.

== Government and administration ==
The capital of Los Rios Region is Valdivia.

The region's 12 communes are distributed between 2 provinces. These are:

- Valdivia Province: Including Valdivia, Mariquina, Lanco, Panguipulli, Máfil, Los Lagos, Paillaco, and Corral municipalities
- Ranco Province: Including La Unión, Río Bueno, Lago Ranco and Futrono municipalities.

Valdivia is part of Northern Patagonia as its wild virgin forest embrace the Patagonian Cordillera following the river Calle Calle down to the Pacific Ocean. It is known in Patagonia the term " Bosque Valdiviano" referring to the primitive virgin forest found in the cordillera valleys of Valdivia which include dense masses of native trees. These Forest are present in some parts of Northern Patagonia both in Chile and Argentina.

== History ==
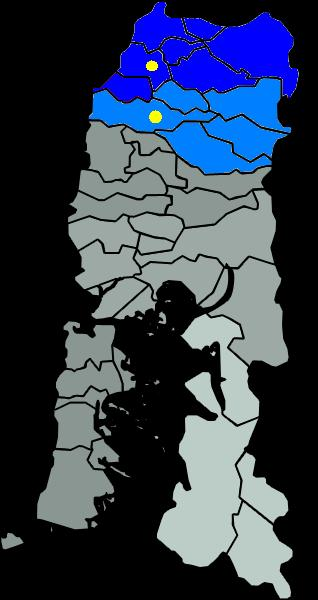
Map of the Los Rios Region and the remaining Los Lagos Region (Grey). Paillaco is in Valdivia province instead of Ranco Province, as initially proposed.

=== Republic of Chile ===
In the beginning of the Chilean Republic, Valdivia was one of the original eight provinces established. The reason for the incorporation was not so much the value of Valdivia, per se, but to minimize the threat to Chilean independence posed by Spaniards in the territory. As German Chilean immigrants arrived in the city during the mid 19th century, the local economy started to develop industries. By 1900, Valdivia was the third most industrialized city in Chile, however, a period of decline started with the world wars. After the Great Chilean earthquake in 1960, Valdivia fell deeper into decline. Much of the city was destroyed and many people left the city.

In 1974 the military junta reorganized the political divisions of Chile deciding that Valdivia was no longer adequate to be a "first class administrative territory" capital. Hence, it was reclassified into a province within Los Lagos Region and Puerto Montt was designated capital. Valdivians greatly resented this decision because they felt they were better suited to be the capital than Puerto Montt, holding forth the following arguments:

- Valdivia was founded in 1552,
- Valdivia had resisted pirate attacks and hostile natives,
- Valdivia had survived several earthquakes,
- Puerto Montt, founded in 1853, three hundred and one years later, was a considerably newer city.

=== Creation of the new region ===
On October 19, 2005 Chilean President Ricardo Lagos signed a bill allowing for the creation of Los Ríos Region ("The Rivers Region"). The bill was approved by Congress on December 19, 2006; it was signed into law on March 16, 2007 and published on April 5, 2007. According to the Roman numeral designation, currently used in Chile, this region is number XIV (fourteenth). However, steps are being taken to no longer refer to the regions by numbers.

==== Osorno ====
When the new region was considered by Congress, Osorno made several proposals:

- To make Osorno the new capital
- To make La Unión the capital
- To expand Osorno Province adding to it the comuna of Río Bueno.

It was proposed that Osorno Province join as the third province of the new region, instead of remaining the fourth province of Los Lagos Region, however, in a referendum held in 2006 the residents of that province rejected the idea.

== Geography ==
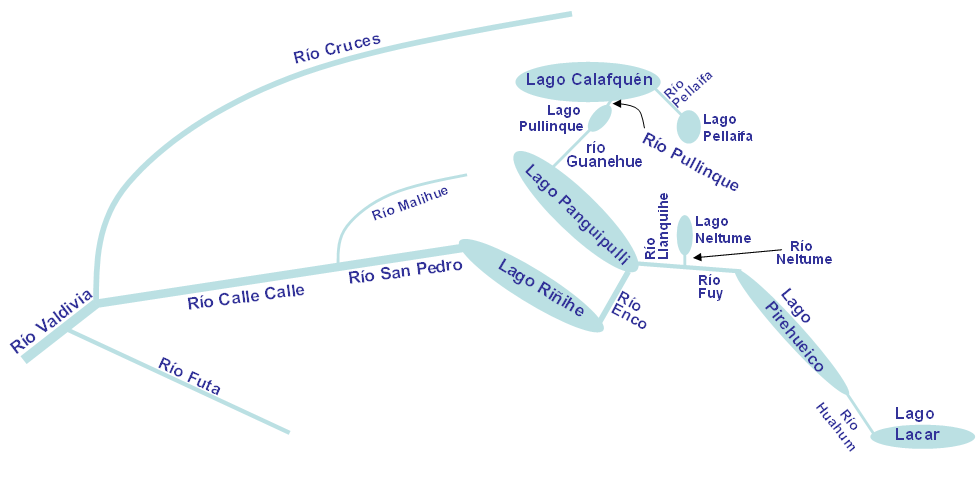
Map of the drainage network of Valdivia River. Valdivia River empties to Corral Bay in the Pacific Ocean. View of Panguipulli Lake.

Los Ríos Region lies in the southern temperate zone and in a tectonically active milieu. Four distinct landscape types, or morphological units, can be distinguished in the region. These are from west to east; the Coastal Range, the Intermediate Depression, the Precordillera and the Andes. These units are oriented parallel to the coast and the subduction zone there. An exception to this are the eastern hills in Mariquina and Máfil that despite belonging to the Coast Range system adrift eastwards and comes very close to the Precordillera cutting the Intermediate Depression in two. The Coastal Cordillera does not exceed the 1000 m in height being Cerro Oncol (715 m) the highest point in the section north of Valdivia River. The Coast Range is cut by Valdivia and Bueno Rivers, deeply incised rivers that drains the inland. Most of the Coast is covered by native Valdivian temperate rain forest, although it has in some parts been substituted by plantations of exotic species, specially Douglas firs and eucalyptus.

Two great agricultural flatlands exist in the region, the Mariquina valley and Los Llanos of La Unión and Río Bueno. The first one is a tectonic depression in the Coast Range connected to Valdivia by Cruces River and the second is the continuation of the Intermediate Depression that re-opens south of Máfil. The flatlands and mayor river valleys form large, open, cultural landscapes used as grassing meadows or for growing crops.

The Precordillera is a narrow band characterized by hosting a large number of deep glacial piedmont lakes that are dammed by moraines. These lakes intersect forested granitic mountain massifs of up to 1500 m, such as Cordillera Negra and Cerros de Quimán.The Precordilleran hills and mountains have step slopes to the north and south as the main direction of the Quaternary glaciers where from east to west. Many lake shores are cleared lands where agriculture, settlements and resort areas develop.

=== Andes ===
The proper Andes extends from the eastern half of the Precordillean lakes to the border with Neuquén Province in Argentina. The Andes in this part of Chile, the Zona Sur, has almost escaped the Andean orogenesis. Here the Andes consist of old granitic plutons such as the Panguipulli Batholith and the North Patagonian Batholith together with volcanics and some minor areas of sediments and metasediments. As result of the minimal Andean mountainbuilding the mountains shows little rejuvenation and are mostly shaped by erosive agents, specially glaciers. An exception to this are the several volcanoes that rises east of the piedmont lakes, this volcanoes are among the most active in Chile and as result their form are influenced by the eruptions; either in constructive manner such as Villarrica Volcano or more destructive like Quetrupillán. The fact that these volcanoes have the ability to build up cones and rise again after erosion and explosive eruptions makes many of them the highest mountains in the region and Zona Sur. The volcanoes of Los Ríos Regions belong to the Southern Volcanic Zone of Andes, whose current activity front is located about 200 km west from the main Andean cordillera, this makes volcanoes stand out as isolated snow-covered cones of more than 2000 m, above the lower mountains that rarely pass the 1500 m. The main cordillera makes up the continental divide and are therefore according to the 1881 Argentina-Chile treaty the border between the two nations. Faults and glacier action have however made a gap at the site of Huahum Pass where waters from the eastern Argentine slopes drains westward to the Pacific Mountains at the cordillera may reach at most some 2000 m in height. Andean valleys of Los Ríos Region are deep and broad and either used for raising cattle or for wood lodging, as well as tourism and protection of biodiversity. These glacial valleys are placed above old Miocene rivers and faults. The chief fault is the Liquiñe-Ofqui Fault that crosses the whole region from north to south allowing numerous valleys to develop above it. The Liquiñe-Ofqui Fault is tectonically active causing minor tremors and is also believed responsible by geologists for the alignment of the volcanoes of the southern section of the Southern Volcanic Zone. Along Liquiñe-Ofqui Fault there are several hotsprings such as Liquiñe, Chihuío, Termas Geométricas, Termas Vergara and Termas de Coñaripe.

=== Hydrography ===
The region owes its name to the river network that converge in Valdivia River at the city of Valdivia. These rivers drain most of northern Los Ríos Region as well as parts of Araucanía Region and Neuquén Province in Argentina. A second large river, Bueno River is responsible for the draining of the southern parts of the region including Ranco Lake, Chile's 4th largest lake. Bueno River and its tributary Pilmaiquén River also drain large areas of Osorno Province and form the southern boundary of the region. These two big river systems receive a continuous inflow of water due to being fed by lakes and lake chains in the Andes. Valdivia River is provided by the Seven Lakes chain plus Lácar Lake and Bueno River from Ranco, Maihue and Puyehue Lake. The large lakes in the interior are fed by rainwater and snow melt from the higher mountains. Glaciers and semipermanent snow patches have relatively low share flow volume of the main rivers.

== Demographics ==
Historical population
Year	Pop.	±% p.a.
1835	8,860	—
1843	23,066	+12.70%
1854	18,065	−2.20%
1865	23,429	+2.39%
1875	30,525	+2.68%
1885	41,987	+3.24%
1895	60,687	+3.75%
1907	118,277	+5.72%
1920	175,141	+3.07%
1930	236,115	+3.03%
1940	191,642	−2.07%
1952	232,647	+1.63%
1960	259,794	+1.39%
1970	277,934	+0.68%
1982	307,150	+0.84%
1992	329,925	+0.72%
2002	356,396	+0.77%
2017	384,837	+0.51%
2024	398,230	+0.49%
Source: INE

As of the 2024 census, the population of the region is 398,230, ranking it 11th among Chile's 16 regions and has a share of 2.2% of the national total. 48.4% are male and 51.6% are female. People under 15 years old make up 17.3% of the population, and people over 65 years old make up 15.4%. 67.5% of the population is urban and 32.5% is rural.

42.7% of the region lives in Valdivia, its capital city.

Los Ríos Region has a large indigenous population, with 24.3% of census respondents identifying as indigenous in 2024. It has a large German presence along with Los Lagos Region, due to the German colonization of Valdivia, Osorno and Llanquihue.

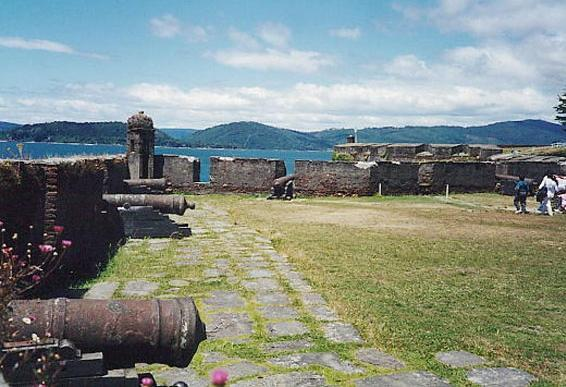
Valdivian Fort System founded by the Spaniards in Corral.

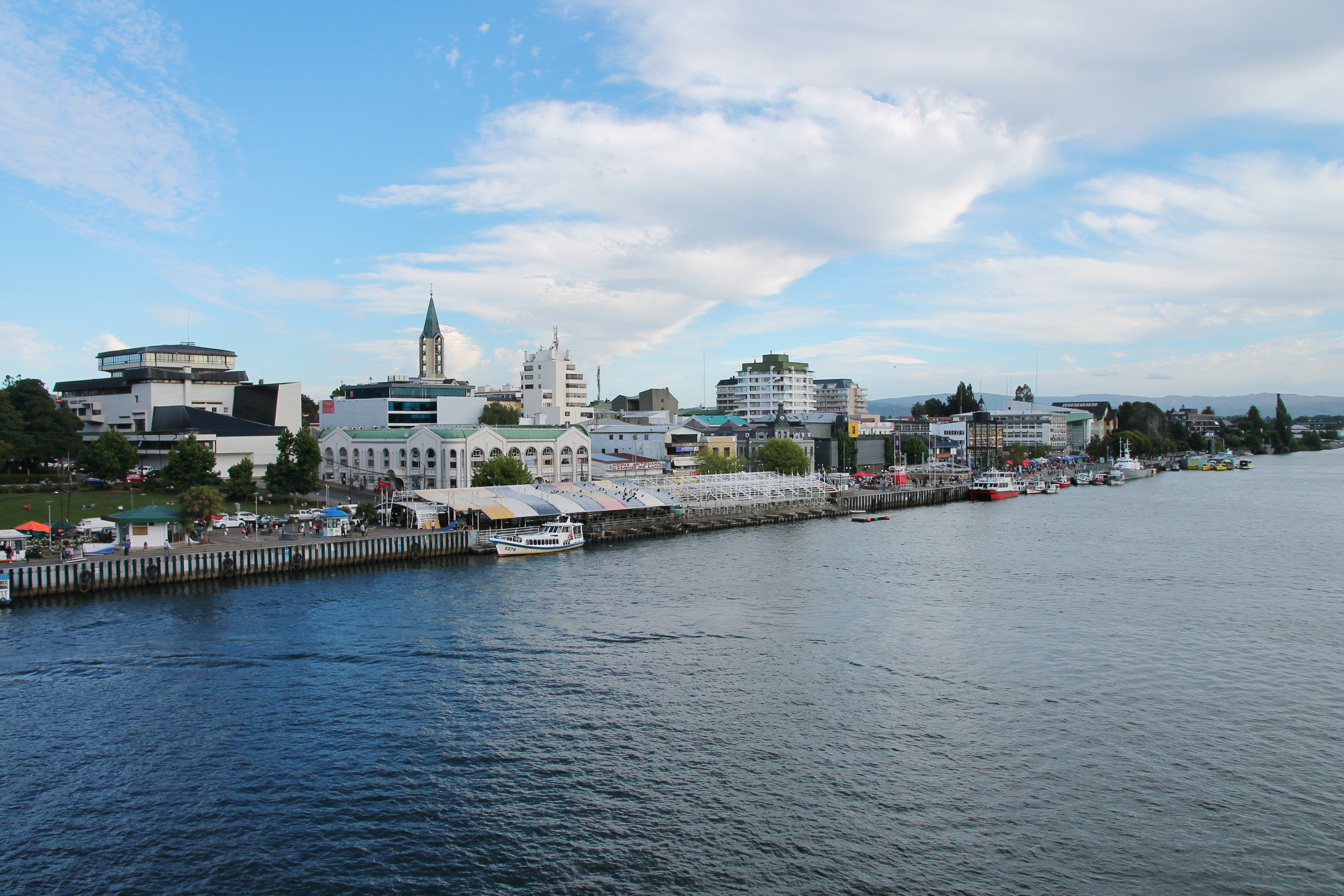
Valdivia.

Demographics by commune in Los Ríos Region
Commune	Population (2024)	Area (km²)	Density (inh./km²)	Poverty (%)	Rural (%)	Indigenous (%) (Note: In the 2002 Census indigenous peoples were calculated on the basis of selfidentification. The dominant indigenous peoples in Los Ríos Region are Huilliche and Mapuche, while indigenous peoples from other areas of Chile makes up a tiny minority, located mainly in Valdivia.)	Illiteracy (%)
Corral	5,501	766.7	7.2	37.3	32.8	11.5	9.9
Futrono	15,635	2,120.6	7.4	35.1	43.9	17.9	8.0
La Unión	38,907	2,136.7	18.2	26.5	35.1	9.2	6.7
Lago Ranco	10,527	1,763.3	6.0	29.6	78.2	31.8	9.3
Lanco	16,876	532.4	31.7	35.0	31.3	19.3	7.6
Los Lagos	21,431	1,791.2	12.0	35.5	53.0	3.9	9.1
Máfil	8,074	582.7	13.9	21.3	47.4	6.3	8.9
Mariquina	22,973	1,320.5	17.4	29.4	51.0	23.2	8.5
Paillaco	19,802	896.0	22.1	29.7	48.8	4.9	7.2
Panguipull	35,098	3,292.1	10.7	34.4	52.2	30.8	14.1
Río Bueno	33,363	2,211.7	15.1	36.8	53.9	11.9	9.7
Valdivia	170,043	1,015.6	167.4	20.8	7.5	5.0	2.3

=== Settlements ===
List of settlements in Los Ríos Region
Name	Population (2002)	Type	Commune
Antilhue	934	Village	Los Lagos
Calafquén	103	Hamlet	Panguipulli
Caleta Chaihuín	36	Hamlet	Corral
Choshuenco	625	Village	Panguipulli
Coñaripe	1,416	Town	Panguipulli
Corral	3,670	Town	Corral
Curiñanco	274	Hamlet	Valdivia
Futrono	6,603	City	Futrono
La Unión	25,615	City	La Unión
Lanco	7,817	City	Lanco
Lago Ranco	2,205	Town	Lago Ranco
Liquiñe	1,205	Town	Panguipulli
Llifén	748	Town	Futrono
Los Lagos	9,479	City	Los Lagos
Máfil	3,793	Town	Máfil
Malalhue	2,566	Town	Lanco
Neltume	2,125	Town	Panguipulli
Mehuín	1,135	Town	Mariquina
Niebla	2,202	Town	Valdivia
Nontuela	1,048	Town	Futrono
Riñihue	243	Hamlet	Los Lagos
Río Bueno	15,054	City	Río Bueno
Panguipulli	11,142	City	Panguipulli
Paillaco	9,973	City	Paillaco
Puerto Fuy	391	Village	Panguipulli
Puerto Pirihueico	13	Village	Panguipulli
San José de la Mariquina	7,790	City	Mariquina
Pishuinco	228	Hamlet	Valdivia
Punucapa	75	Hamlet	Valdivia
Torobayo	148	Hamlet	Valdivia
Valdivia	127,750	City	Valdivia

=== Immigration ===
As of the 2024 census, immigrants make up 1.9% of the population - 1.5% are from South America, 0.2% from North America, 0.2% from Europe, 0.03% from Asia, 0.004% from Africa, and 0.01% from Oceania.

== Culture ==
The Valdivia International Film Festival (FICV) is the most important film event in Chile, one of the most important worldwide and in Latin America. It has been held since 1994, generally during the month of October.

The Valdivia Book Fair is organized annually by the Municipal Cultural Corporation of the city, with the support of the Government of Los Ríos, in the Saval Park. In this context, several authors born in the Los Ríos Region stand out, such as Maha Vial, Iván Espinoza Riesco, José Baroja, Aldo Astete Cuadra, Efraín Miranda Cárdenas, to name a few.

The International Sculpture Symposium of Valdivia is cataloged as one of the most important events in Chile and one of the most prestigious in Latin America.

The Valdivia International Jazz Festival was born in July 2000. Today it is considered the oldest festival in Chile and one of the most important in this musical genre in the Southern Cone.

== See also ==
- List of Chile-related topics
- Flag of Los Ríos Region
- WikiLosRios, a wiki-based web encyclopedia about Los Ríos
