= List of rivers of Los Ríos Region =

The information regarding List of rivers in the Los Ríos Region on this page has been compiled from the data supplied by GeoNames. It includes all features named "Rio", "Canal", "Arroyo", "Estero" and those Feature Code is associated with a stream of water. (Note: The arbitrarily selected codes are RPDS, CHN, CNLA, CNLB, CNLD, CNLI, CNLN, CNLSB, CRKT, DTCH, DTCHI, DTCHD, ESTY, FORD, SBED, STM, STMA, STMB, STMC, STMD, STMH, STMI, STMIX, STMM, STMQ, STMS, STMSB, STMX, TNLC, WTRC, WTRH) This list contains 165 water streams.

== Content ==
This list contains:

1. Name of the stream, in Spanish Language
2. Coordinates are latitude and longitude of the feature in ± decimal degrees, at the mouth of the stream
3. Link to a map including the Geonameid (a number which uniquely identifies a Geoname feature)
4. Feature Code explained in
5. Other names for the same feature, if any
6. Basin countries additional to Chile, if any

== List ==
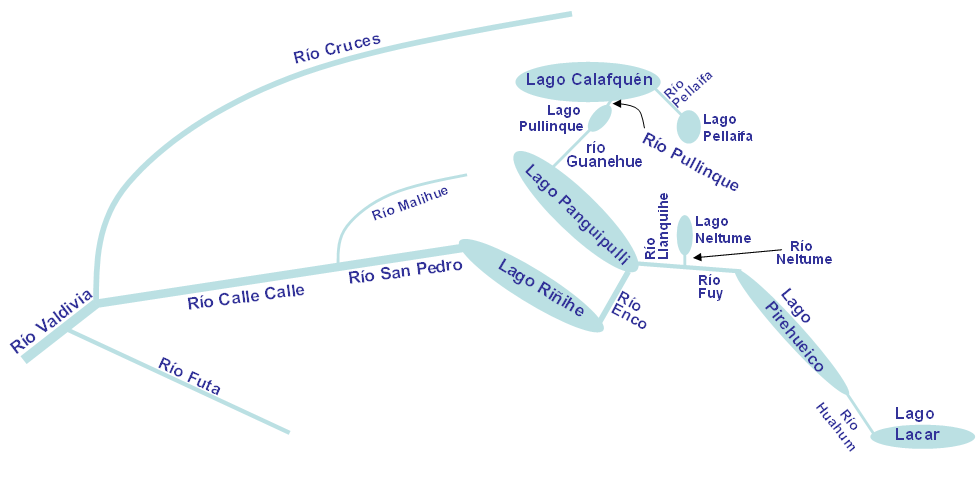
Map of the drainage network of Valdivia River. Valdivia River empties to Corral Bay in the Pacific Ocean.

- Río El Lingue • 39.44597°S 73.22043°W • 3891183 • STM • (Rio El Lingue, Rio Lingua, Rio Lingue, Rio Mehuin, Río El Lingue, Río Lingua, Río Mehuin)
- Río Valdivia • 39.87769°S 73.38318°W • 3868702 • STM • (Rio Valdivia, Río Valdivia)

- Río Callecalle • 39.82185°S 73.2213°W • 3897250 • STM

- Río San Pedro • 39.85272°S 72.75892°W • 3871791 • STM

- Río Enco • 39.91843°S 72.16438°W • 3890095 • STM

- Río Llanquihue • 39.82513°S 72.09074°W • 3882954 • STM

- Neltume River

- Liquiñe River

- Fui River • 39.82167°S 72.01186°W • 3889220 • STM

- Río Hua Hum • 40.11667°S 71.66667°W • 3888614 • STM • (Rio Guahun, Rio Guahun Norte, Rio Hua Hum, Rio Huaun, Río Guahún, Río Guahún Norte, Río Hua Hum, Río Huaun, Rio Huahum) • (AR)

- Chapelco River (AR)

- Río Lipinza • 39.99942°S 71.72406°W • 3883110 • STM

- Pullinque River

- Guanehue River

- Estero Llancahue • 39.85876°S 73.16397°W • 3882992 • STM

- Rio Cau Cau • 39.79561°S 73.25624°W • 6459019 • STM
- Río Cruces • 39.8208°S 73.27057°W • 3893256 • STM

- Río Pichoy • 39.58519°S 73.13873°W • 3876217 • STM

- Río Iñaque • 39.68354°S 73.00589°W • 3887304 • STM

- Río Máfil • 39.68422°S 73.00544°W • 3881044 • STM • (Rio Mafil, Rio Mafit, Río Mafit, Río Máfil)

- Estero Cutipay • 39.83306°S 73.34215°W • 3892809 • STM
- Río Torna Galeones • 39.89027°S 73.37797°W • 3869600 • STM • (Tornagaleones)

- Río Angachilla • 39.87905°S 73.24036°W • 3899650 • STM
- Río Futa • 39.87534°S 73.26187°W • 3889227 • STM • (Rio Fula, Rio Futa, Río Fula, Río Futa)
- Río Naguilán • 39.95212°S 73.29906°W • 3879102 • STM

- Río Chaihuín • 39.96502°S 73.57063°W • 3895652 • STM
- Río Pescado • 41.25164°S 72.79505°W • 3876447 • STM • (Rio Calbuco, Rio Pescado, Río Calbuco, Río Pescado)
- Río Colún • 40.08359°S 73.64204°W • 3893983 • STM
- Río Bueno • 40.2446°S 73.71389°W • 3897808 • STM (Some tributaries of Bueno River flow also in Los Lagos Region)

- Río Llollelhue • 40°15′53.26″S 72°1′25.2″W • 3897326 • STM • (Rio Calcurrupe, Río Calcurrupe)
- Río Caunahue • 40.17997°S 72.26226°W • 3896119 • STM
- Río Calcurrupe • 40.22078°S 72.26722°W • 3897326 • STM • (Rio Calcurrupe, Río Calcurrupe)

- Río Pillanleufu • 40.24679°S 72.03362°W • 3875985 • STM
- Río Hueinahue • 40.31291°S 71.98693°W • 3887716 • STM

- Río Nilahue • 40.25713°S 72.25122°W • 3878648 • STM • (Rio Milahue, Rio Nilahue, Río Milahue, Río Nilahue)

- Río Contrafuerte • 40.40554°S 72.0828°W • 3893707 • STM
- Los Venados

- Río Riñinahue • 40.33164°S 72.24283°W • 3873157 • STM
- Río Pilmaiquén • 40.35021°S 73.12851°W • 3875964 • STM (+Los Lagos R.)

- Río Golgol • 40.67632°S 72.34018°W • 3888948 • STM • (Gol-gol) • (Los Lagos R.)

- Río Rahue • 40.33945°S 73.31569°W • 3873850 • STM • (Los Lagos R.)

- Estero Pichi Damas • 40.57219°S 73.14603°W • 3876275 • STM • (Estero Pichi Damas, Rio Damas, Río Damas) • (Los Lagos R.)

- Estero Quillén • 39.43176°S 72.79008°W • 3874131 • STM
- Estero Huiño-Huiño • 40.50436°S 72.89294°W • 3887491 • STM
- Estero La Poza • 40.50762°S 72.89218°W • 3884921 • STM
- Estero Lleco • 39.44276°S 73.14218°W • 3882921 • STM
- Estero Venados • 39.46071°S 73.09461°W • 3868503 • STM
- Estero Plalafquén • 39.50543°S 73.25106°W • 3875683 • STM
- Estero Epucó • 39.51589°S 73.24545°W • 3890022 • STM
- Estero Quechué • 39.53924°S 73.03865°W • 3874461 • STM
- Estero Llillil • 39.56284°S 73.28341°W • 3882884 • STM
- Estero Pullafquén • 39.57213°S 73.15039°W • 3874882 • STM
- Estero Ralicura • 39.57226°S 73.15115°W • 3873837 • STM
- Estero Pelluco • 39.5767°S 73.28004°W • 3876747 • STM
- Estero Bellavista • 39.6067°S 73.16946°W • 3898464 • STM
- Estero Guallamo • 39.61098°S 73.30472°W • 3888542 • STM • (Estero Guallamo, Estero Huallame, Estero Huellame)
- Estero Nonuco • 39.64319°S 72.93902°W • 3878561 • STM
- Río Pelchuquin • 39.64349°S 73.12701°W • 3876794 • STM
- Río Nañihue • 39.66101°S 73.16163°W • 3879040 • STM • (Rio Manihue, Rio Nanihue, Río Mañihue, Río Nañihue)
- Río Cudico • 39.66146°S 73.15969°W • 3893158 • STM
- Río Pille Cozcoz • 39.66563°S 72.74624°W • 3875983 • STM
- Río Rucapichin • 39.66806°S 72.98843°W • 3872735 • STM
- Río Putregual • 39.68542°S 72.85529°W • 3874547 • STM
- Estero Curahuche • 39.68569°S 73.36677°W • 3892912 • STM
- Estero Calabozo • 39.68666°S 72.97557°W • 3897363 • STM
- Estero Tambillo • 39.71507°S 73.23945°W • 3870207 • STM
- Estero Cusilelfu • 39.7164°S 72.64388°W • 3892822 • STM
- Río Callumapu • 39.72221°S 73.18847°W • 3897225 • STM • (Rio Callumapu, Rio Cayumapu, Río Callumapu, Río Cayumapu)
- Estero Coihueco • 39.73657°S 72.65217°W • 3894389 • STM
- Estero Traleufu • 39.74199°S 71.85347°W • 3869354 • STM
- Estero Malihue • 39.7456°S 72.66207°W • 3880857 • STM • (Estero Malihue, Estero Malilhue)
- Río Mañiu • 39.74962°S 72.528°W • 3880695 • STM
- Estero Rehue • 39.74964°S 73.29976°W • 3873541 • STM
- Estero Cuchimalal • 39.74968°S 73.38611°W • 3893166 • STM
- Estero Noschaco • 39.75141°S 72.5666°W • 3878492 • STM
- Río Carranco • 39.75813°S 71.81822°W • 3896549 • STM • (Rio Caranco, Rio Carranco, Río Caranco, Río Carranco)
- Estero Cuicuileufu • 39.78588°S 72.98213°W • 3893084 • STM
- Estero Mulpun • 39.78924°S 72.96777°W • 3879189 • STM
- Estero Traiguenleufu • 39.80854°S 72.15553°W • 3869368 • STM
- Estero Colegual • 39.81628°S 72.61256°W • 3894290 • STM • (Estero Coleguai, Estero Colegual)
- Estero Laureño • 39.81965°S 72.91852°W • 3883617 • STM • (Estero Laurana, Estero Lauraña, Estero Laureno, Estero Laureño)
- Río Ranquintuleufu • 39.82337°S 71.99846°W • 3873728 • STM
- Estero Panqueco • 39.82488°S 72.46194°W • 3877315 • STM
- Estero del Choco • 39.82564°S 73.04227°W • 3894907 • STM
- Estero Coñico • 39.82575°S 72.36976°W • 3893768 • STM
- Río Huilehuile • 39.82753°S 72.04214°W • 3887550 • STM • (Rio Huilehuil, Rio Huilehuile, Rio Huilehuilo, Río Huilehuil, Río Huilehuile, Río Huilehuilo)
- Estero Coshue • 39.83°S 72.38858°W • 3893389 • STM
- Estero Punco • 39.84195°S 72.6993°W • 3874829 • STM
- Estero Legleufu • 39.84453°S 72.69905°W • 3883436 • STM • (Estero Legleufu, Estero Lleleufu)
- Río Quinchilca • 39.85383°S 72.75986°W • 3874032 • STM
- Río Truful • 39.85449°S 71.9631°W • 3869014 • STM
- Río Llecue • 39.85576°S 72.58455°W • 3882920 • STM
- Estero Quillén • 39.85609°S 72.58363°W • 3874130 • STM
- Río Collileufu • 39.85849°S 72.81342°W • 3894187 • STM
- Estero Huiñahuiña • 39.86972°S 72.81135°W • 3887508 • STM • (Estero Huinahuina, Estero Huinahuino, Estero Huiñahuiña, Estero Huiñahuiño)
- Río Tirinel • 39.8779°S 72.14031°W • 3869767 • STM
- Estero Machaco • 39.88013°S 72.80996°W • 3881107 • STM
- Estero Remehue • 39.88883°S 72.25335°W • 3873492 • STM
- Estero Rucanahue • 39.90552°S 72.22503°W • 3872742 • STM
- Estero Chapuco • 39.90863°S 72.80768°W • 3895409 • STM
- Río Remehue • 39.91141°S 72.56361°W • 3873489 • STM
- Estero Punahue • 39.91253°S 72.66894°W • 3874831 • STM
- Río Putraiquen • 39.91378°S 72.55159°W • 3874554 • STM
- Estero Ponpongo • 39.91483°S 72.66087°W • 3875457 • STM
- Estero Mal Paso • 39.91667°S 72.81667°W • 3880808 • STM
- Estero Pichico • 39.9183°S 72.67037°W • 3876291 • STM
- Estero Hirrevilo • 39.92984°S 72.99379°W • 3887994 • STM
- Estero Lipingüe • 39.92994°S 72.81042°W • 3883112 • STM
- Estero Piedra • 39.94122°S 72.60143°W • 3876150 • STM
- Río Los Llanos • 39.94273°S 73.37733°W • 3881914 • STM • (Rio Los Llanos, Rio los Llanos, Río Los Llanos, Río los Llanos)
- Estero Huiti • 39.96918°S 72.68418°W • 3887471 • STM
- Río Trafún • 39.97686°S 72.51275°W • 3869392 • STM
- Estero Lumaco • 39.97697°S 72.58205°W • 3881175 • STM
- Estero Lumaco • 39.98219°S 73.28602°W • 3881176 • STM
- Estero Montolo • 39.98271°S 72.61484°W • 3879414 • STM
- Estero Paso Malo • 39.99681°S 73.48818°W • 3877083 • STM
- Estero La Viga • 40.0107°S 73.46712°W • 3883536 • STM
- Estero Lumaco • 40.02345°S 72.93759°W • 3881174 • STM
- Estero Dollinco • 40.04296°S 72.63613°W • 3892328 • STM
- Estero Radal • 40.04727°S 72.91303°W • 3873867 • STM
- Estero Rucaquilau • 40.04839°S 72.91457°W • 3872733 • STM
- Estero Pescado • 40.05081°S 72.94738°W • 3876450 • STM
- Río La Junta • 40.05°S 72.96667°W • 3885538 • STM
- Río Mocho • 40.06172°S 71.97468°W • 3879658 • STM
- Estero Maiquén • 40.07823°S 71.71182°W • 3880974 • STM
- Río Maihuin • 40.08852°S 73.37274°W • 3881002 • STM
- Estero Catamutún • 40.09369°S 73.14138°W • 3896181 • STM
- Río Quimán • 40.12539°S 72.35585°W • 3874072 • STM
- Río Pilmaiquén • 40.12607°S 71.97693°W • 3875965 • STM
- Río Canileufu • 40.14004°S 73.17837°W • 3896906 • STM
- Río Coique • 40.14876°S 72.47141°W • 3894343 • STM • (Rio Coihue, Rio Coique, Río Coihue, Río Coique)
- Estero Cuñocuño • 40.19652°S 72.92865°W • 3892956 • STM
- Río Curinilahue • 40.20942°S 72.21388°W • 3892848 • STM • (Rio Curinilahue, Rio Curinilehue, Río Curinilahue, Río Curinilehue)
- Estero Chollinco • 40.21106°S 72.27176°W • 3894879 • STM
- Río Curringue • 40.215°S 72.00376°W • 3892831 • STM
- Río Huenteleufú • 40.21944°S 71.95696°W • 3887645 • STM
- Río Temaleufu • 40.24709°S 72.24362°W • 3870030 • STM
- Estero Polcura • 40.24824°S 73.02395°W • 3875531 • STM
- Río Panqueco • 40.25068°S 72.63208°W • 3877314 • STM
- Estero Ralitrán • 40.2634°S 72.7171°W • 3873832 • STM • (Estero Bolitran, Estero Bolitrán, Estero Palitran, Estero Ralitran, Estero Ralitrán)
- Río Ignao • 40.26365°S 72.68013°W • 3887354 • STM • (Rio Ignao, Rio Igoao, Río Ignao, Río Igoao)
- Estero Pitruco • 40.26665°S 72.63633°W • 3875747 • STM
- Estero Quillín • 40.27877°S 72.56307°W • 3874127 • STM
- Estero Molhue • 40.31103°S 72.97775°W • 3879628 • STM • (Estero Malhue, Estero Molhue)
- Estero Mocho • 40.31491°S 72.22673°W • 3879660 • STM
- Río Iculpe • 40.3185°S 72.47346°W • 3887385 • STM
- Estero Yolque • 40.32372°S 72.14438°W • 3867640 • STM
- Estero Chamul • 40.32511°S 72.5107°W • 3895578 • STM • (Estero Chamul, Estero Chumu)
- Estero Huequeco • 40.32519°S 72.02041°W • 3887631 • STM
- Río Rupameica • 40.32998°S 71.85639°W • 3872681 • STM
- Río Pichipichone • 40.33207°S 72.26763°W • 3876228 • STM
- Estero Husco • 40.3321°S 72.00447°W • 3887423 • STM
- Río Contra • 40.33232°S 72.97356°W • 3893711 • STM
- Estero Chaullén • 40.33468°S 72.52044°W • 3895332 • STM • (Estero Chaullen, Estero Chaullue, Estero Chaullén)
- Río Pichi-Iculpe • 40.3363°S 72.43129°W • 3876264 • STM
- Río Melipué • 40.3446°S 71.99333°W • 3880105 • STM
- Estero Chilcoco • 40.34524°S 71.99423°W • 3895123 • STM
- Estero Venado • 40.36866°S 72.08648°W • 3868509 • STM
- Río Pichi-Ignao • 40.37229°S 72.49165°W • 3876263 • STM
- Río Trani • 40.37346°S 72.82787°W • 3869325 • STM
- Estero del Medio • 40.37543°S 72.82551°W • 3880194 • STM
- Estero Collinco • 40.37902°S 72.50604°W • 3894184 • STM
- Estero la Plaza • 40.38567°S 72.07594°W • 3875638 • STM
- Estero Lumaco • 40.38745°S 72.81784°W • 3881173 • STM
- Río Colorado • 40.40124°S 71.98266°W • 3894027 • STM
- Estero Quebrada • 40.40769°S 72.72702°W • 3874517 • STM
- Estero Bolsiquillo • 40.41403°S 72.62068°W • 3898109 • STM
- Estero Overa • 40.41889°S 72.07978°W • 3877910 • STM
- Estero Pantanoso • 40.43373°S 72.6279°W • 3877287 • STM • (Estero Pantanoso, Estero Pantaoso)
- Estero Cancagua • 40.43986°S 72.56535°W • 3897007 • STM
- Estero La Virgen • 40.45927°S 72.00066°W • 3883499 • STM
- Río Cholchos • 40.46226°S 71.9562°W • 3894892 • STM
- Río Blanco • 40.4628°S 71.95671°W • 3898208 • STM
- Río Chaichahuen • 40.46441°S 72.75183°W • 3895663 • STM
- Río Cuyaimán • 40.46476°S 72.751°W • 3892793 • STM
- Río Quilihue • 40.4721°S 72.80774°W • 3874206 • STM
- Río Currileufu • 40.47307°S 72.828°W • 3892832 • STM • (Rio Curileufu, Rio Currileufu, Río Curileufu, Río Currileufu)
- Río Muticao • 40.47749°S 72.82497°W • 3879135 • STM
- Estero Curaco • 40.49594°S 72.73927°W • 3892919 • STM
- Estero Rinconada • 40.50595°S 72.43158°W • 3873268 • STM
- Estero Coihueco • 40.55153°S 72.63418°W • 3894388 • STM
- Estero Los Pasos • 40.55154°S 72.61971°W • 3881632 • STM • (Estero Los Pasos, Estero los Pazos)
- Río Morro • 40.55712°S 72.51193°W • 3879296 • STM
- Río Pichi-Chirri • 40.55966°S 72.65276°W • 3876298 • STM
- Estero Mencahue • 40.56561°S 72.7962°W • 3880061 • STM
- Estero Treguaco • 40.61213°S 72.71847°W • 3869251 • STM
- Río Mantilhue • 40.63848°S 72.56493°W • 3880665 • STM
- Estero La Aguada • 40.64634°S 72.64711°W • 3867498 • STM • (Estero Aguada, Estero La Aguada)

== See also ==
- List of lakes in Chile
- List of volcanoes in Chile
- List of islands of Chile
- List of fjords, channels, sounds and straits of Chile
- List of lighthouses in Chile
