= List of rivers of the Americas =

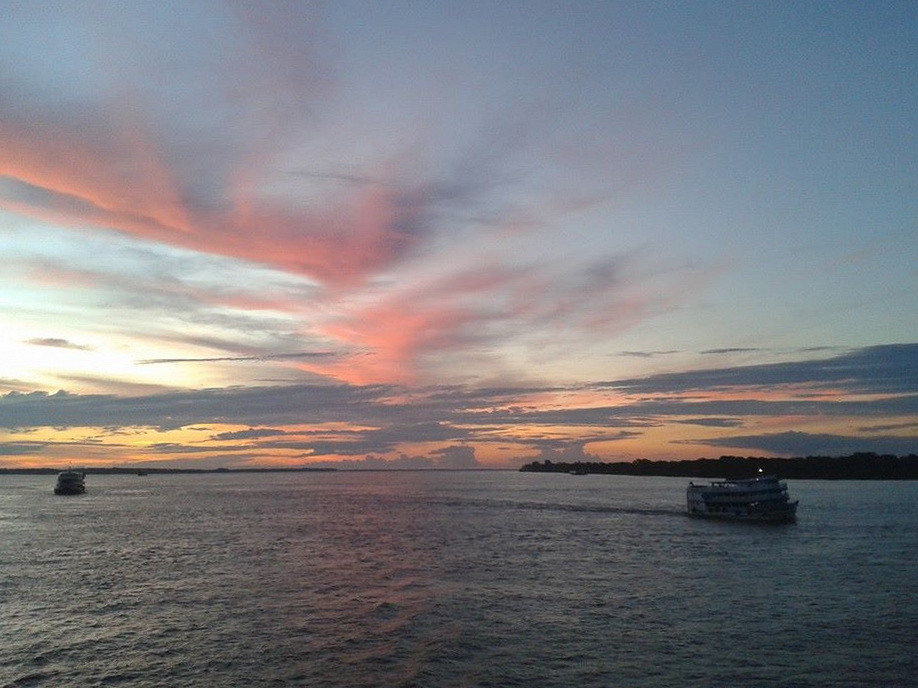
Amazon River near Parintins, Brazil

This is a list of rivers of the Americas, it includes major historical or physiological significant rivers of the Americas grouped by region where they are located (Central America, Northern America, West Indies and South Americas). The longest rivers in each country are included. Further details and references are provided in each river's separate article. Unusually significant tributaries appear in this list, under the river into which they drain.

The longest river in the Americas is the Amazon River. The length of the Amazon River is usually said to be "at least" 6,400 km (4,000 mi), but reported values lie anywhere between 6,275–7,025 km (3,899–4,365 mi). The length measurements of many rivers are only approximations and differ from each other because there are many factors that determine the calculated river length, such as the position of the geographical source and the mouth, the scale of measurement, and the length measuring techniques (for details see also List of rivers by length).

There are 11 countries in the Americas that do not have rivers: Anguilla, Aruba, Bermuda, Bonaire, Cayman Islands, Curaçao, Saba, Saint Barthélemy, Saint Martin, Sint Eustatius, and Sint Maarten.

== North America ==
=== Central America ===
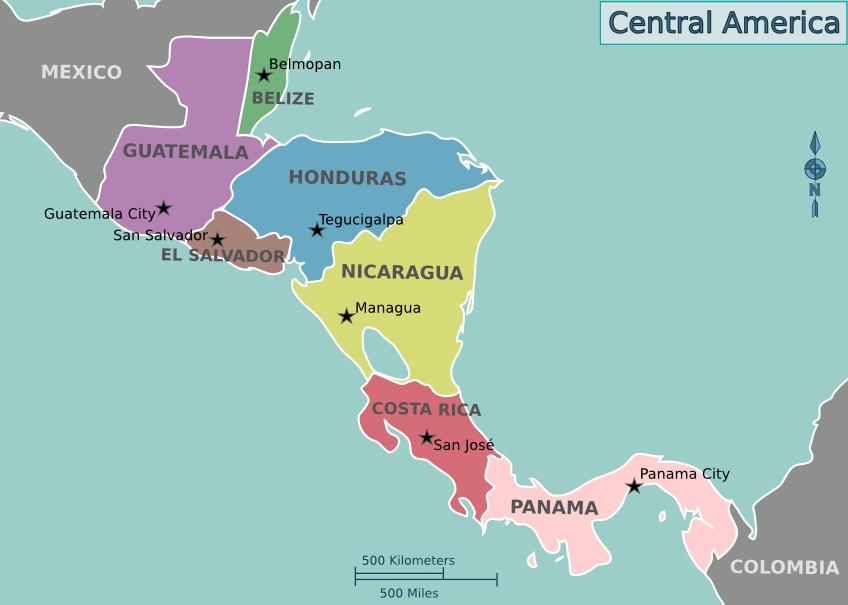
Map of Central America

The water in rivers in Central America flows to either the Atlantic Ocean or Pacific Ocean. The Río Coco, locally known as the Wanks, runs along the border with Honduras and is the longest river flowing totally within Central America. The second longest river in Central America is the Patuca River.

Some of the significant rivers and their lengths in Central America include:

Significant rivers in Central America
River	Countries	Length	Significance
Aguán River	Honduras	150 mi (240 km)	The Aguán River's watershed is one of seven watersheds in Honduras, and covers over 1 million hectares (3,900 mi^{2}), of which around 200,000 are in the Aguán River Valley.
Cahabón River	Guatemala	122 mi (196 km)	known for white water rapids
Choluteca River	Honduras	217 mi (349 km)	noted for severe flooding in 1998
Chucunaque River	Panama	144 mi (232 km)	longest river in Panama
Coco River (Wanki River)	Honduras and Nicaragua	470 mi (760 km)	border river, longest river in Honduras and Nicaragua
Dulce River	Guatemala	27 mi (43 km)	largest bridge in Central America, location of Tarzan movie in 1939
Lempa River	El Salvador, Honduras, Guatemala	262 mi (422 km)	longest and only navigable river in El Salvador
Los Esclavos River	Guatemala	90 mi (140 km)	known for bridge built over the river in 1579 as Spanish Colony
Motagua River	Guatemala	250 mi (400 km)	longest river in Guatemala
New River	Belize	82 mi (132 km)	longest river within Belize
Patuca River	Honduras	310 mi (500 km)	longest river within Honduras
Reventazón River	Costa Rica	90 mi (140 km)	used to generate significant portion of Costa Rica's electricity
San Juan River	Costa Rica, Nicaragua	110 mi (180 km)	longest river in Costa Rica
Tempisque River	Costa Rica	89 mi (143 km)	longest river totally within Costa Rica, important animal habitat, flows entirely within Costa Rica
Ulúa River	Honduras	150 mi (240 km)	known for ornate calcite vessels that date from the Mayan times

=== Northern America ===
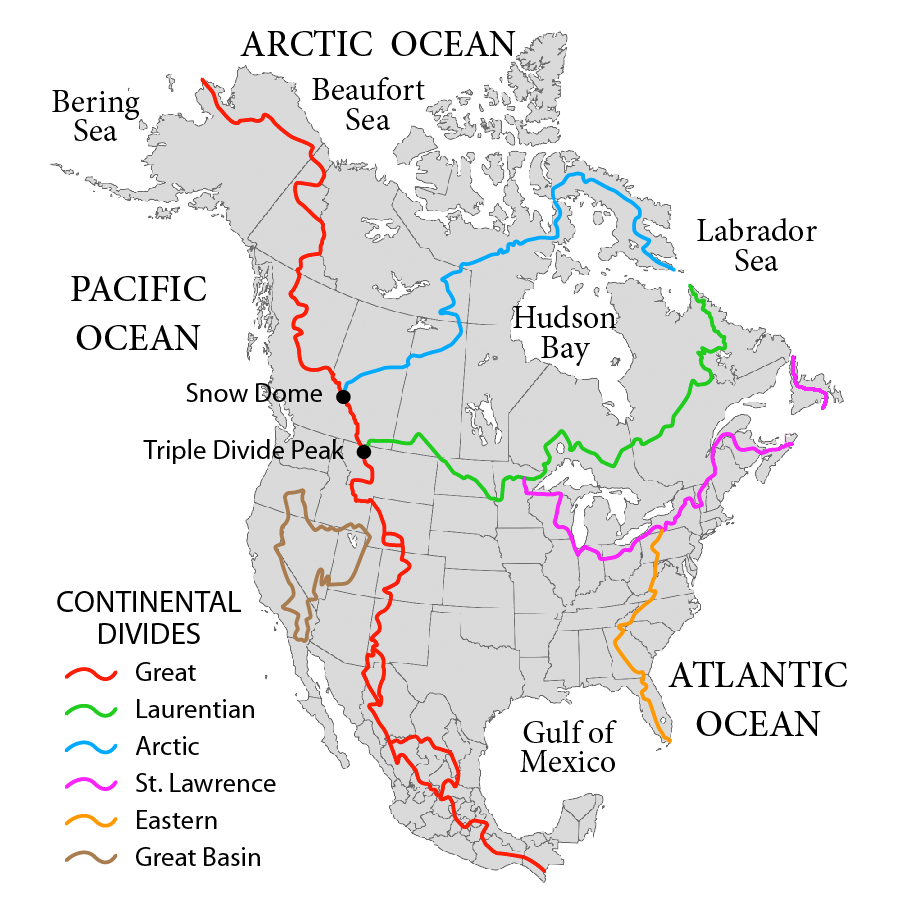
North American watersheds (Atlantic, Arctic, Great Basin, and Pacific)

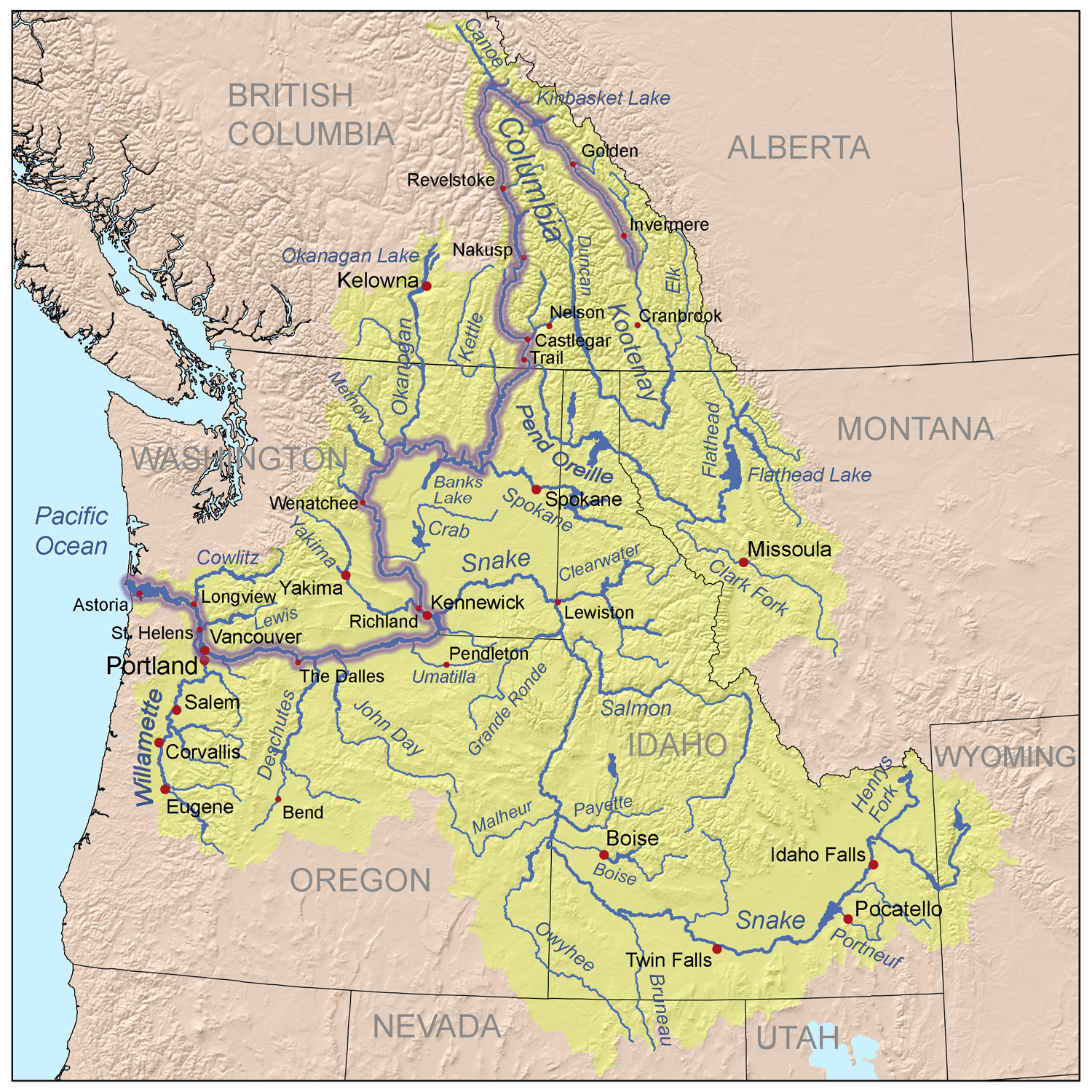
Columbia River basin

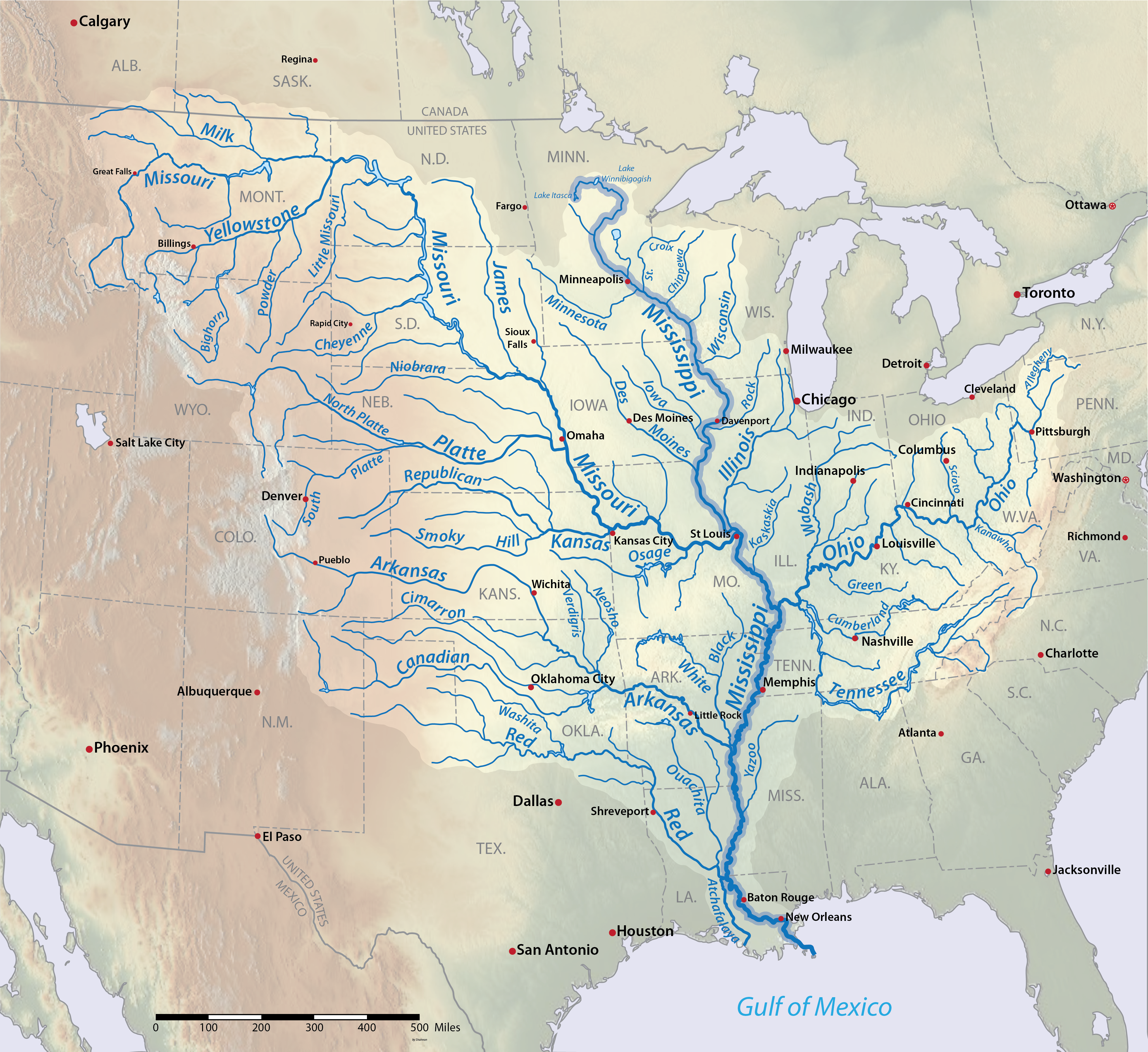
Mississippi River basin

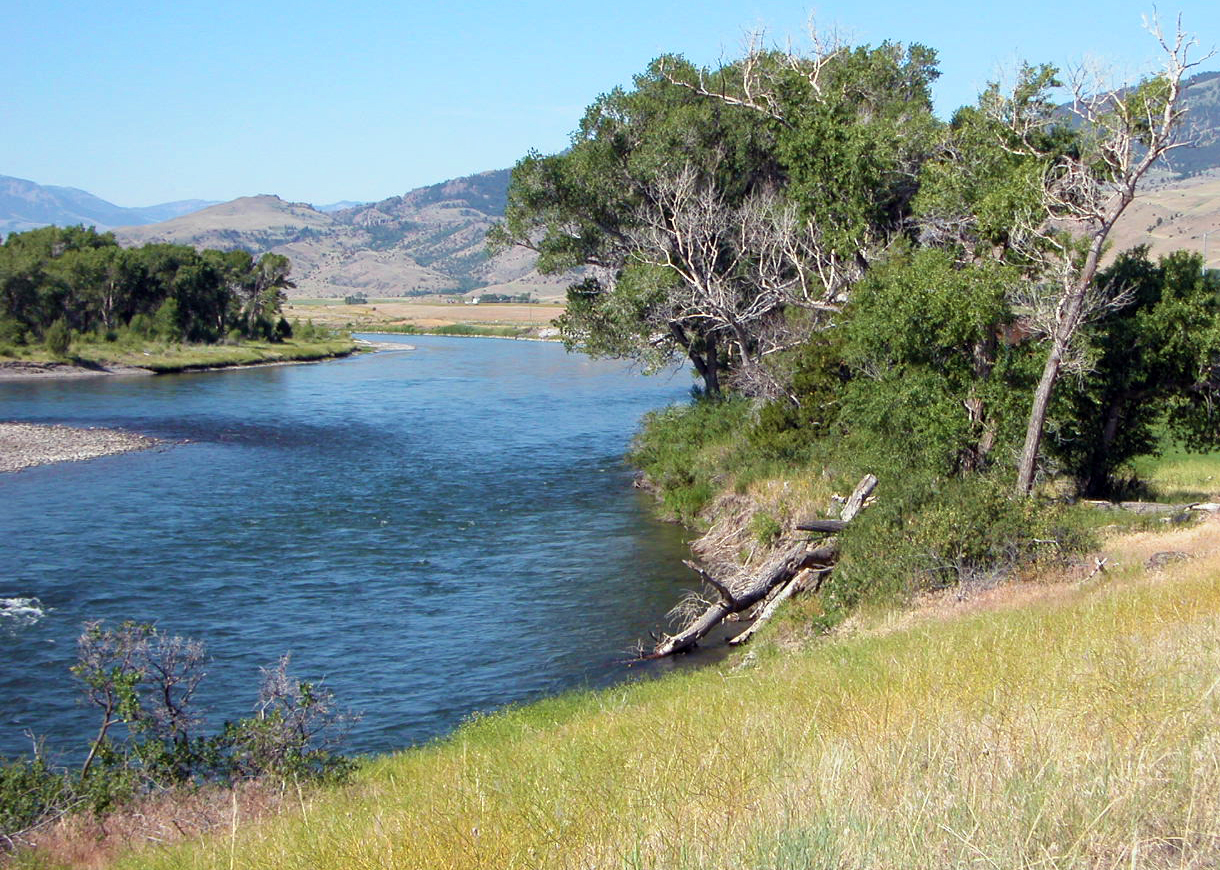
Yellowstone River flowing through Paradise Valley

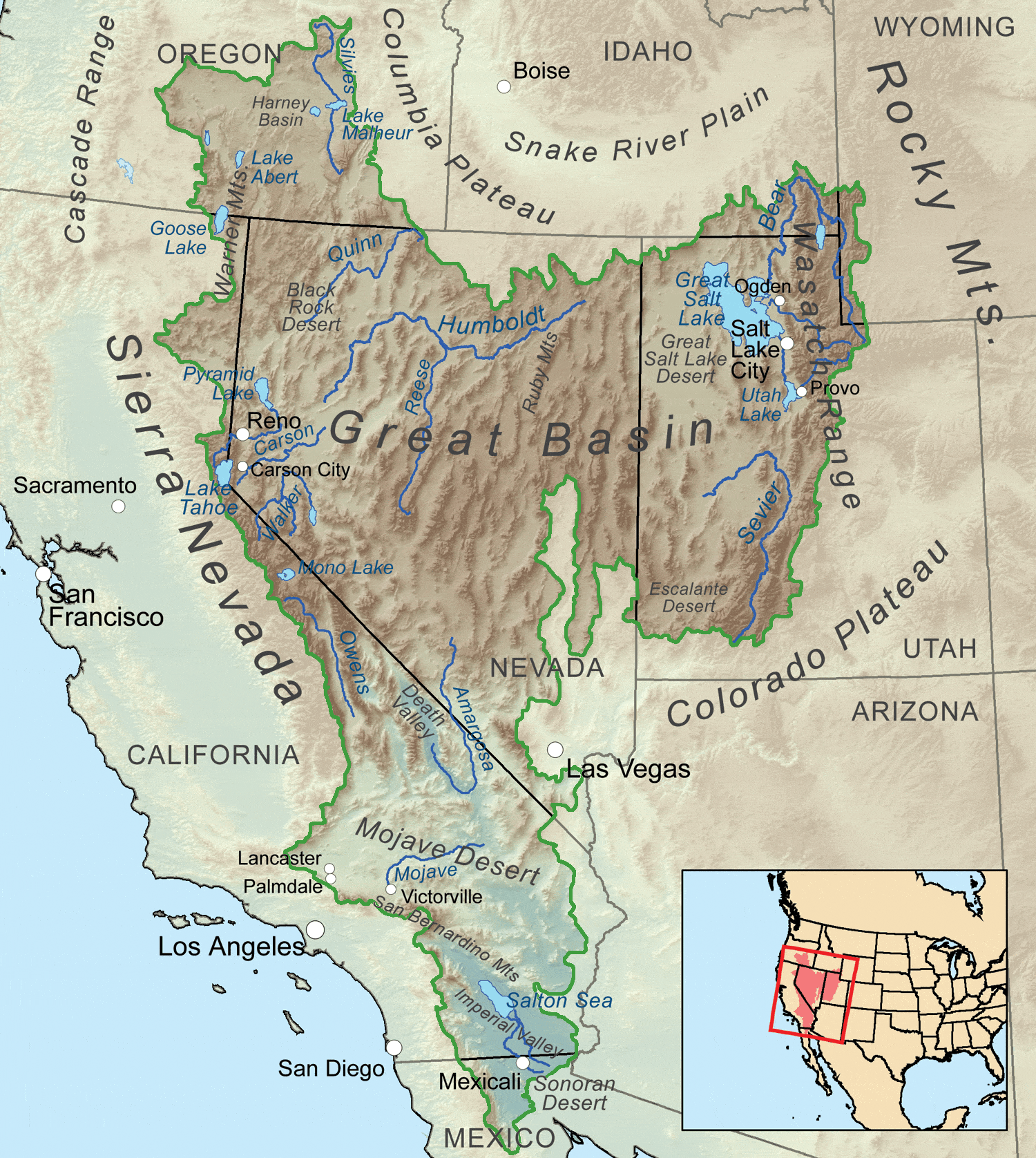
Great Basin

Water from rivers in the Northern Americas flows toward either the Arctic Ocean, Atlantic Ocean, Pacific Ocean, the land-locked Great Basin in the western United States or the interior basin in Mexico.

The Missouri River is the longest river in North America and the United States (2,341 mi (3,767 km)). The second longest river in North America and the United States is the Mississippi River (2,320 mi (3,730 km)). The Rio Conchos (350 mi (560 km)) is the longest river in Mexico. The longest river in Canada is the Mackenzie River (1,080 mi (1,740 km)).

Some of the longest or otherwise notable rivers include the rivers listed in the table below.

Significant rivers in Northern America
River	Countries	Length	Tributary of	Significance
Alabama River	US: Alabama	318 mi (512 km)	Gulf of Mexico	The Edmund Pettus Bridge crosses the Alabama River near Selma. The bridge was the site of the famous marches for voting rights in 1965
Alsek River	Canada: Yukon US: Alaska	240 mi (390 km)	Gulf of Alaska, Pacific Ocean	wilderness river
Altamaha River	US: Georgia	137 mi (220 km)	Atlantic Ocean	bioreserve
Apalachicola River	US: Florida	160 mi (260 km)	Gulf of Mexico	scenic river, former border between East and West Florida
Chattahoochee River	US: Georgia, Alabama, Florida	430 mi (690 km)	Apalachicola River	state borders
Flint River	US: Georgia, Alabama, Florida	344 mi (554 km)	Apalachicola River	mentioned in Gone with the Wind
Colorado River	US: Colorado, Utah, Arizona, Nevada, California Mexico:Baja California, Sonora	1,450 mi (2,330 km)	Gulf of California, Pacific Ocean	Known for its dramatic canyons, whitewater rapids, and eleven U.S. National Parks; vital source of water in Southwest US
Columbia River	Canada: British Columbia US: Washington, Oregon	1,243 mi (2,000 km)	Pacific Ocean	largest river in Pacific Northwest, largest river emptying into the Pacific Ocean in North America
James River	US: Virginia	348 mi (560 km)	Hampton Roads, Chesapeake Bay, Atlantic Ocean	the first permanent English settlement in America and all past and current Virginia capitols, Jamestown, Williamsburg, and Richmond are located along its shores
Snake River	US: Wyoming, Idaho, Oregon, Washington	1,078 mi (1,735 km)	Columbia River	largest tributary of Columbia River, shores populated by Native Americans, discovered by Lewis and Clark
Okanogan River	Canada: British Columbia US: Washington	115 mi (185 km)	Columbia River	early 1800s fur trading river
Kettle River	Canada: British Columbia, US: Washington	175 mi (282 km)	Columbia River	association with Columbia River
Pend Oreille River	US: Washington, Idaho, Canada: British Columbia	130 mi (210 km)	Columbia River	native people (Pend d'Oreilles and Kalispe) lived along the river
Kootenay River	Canada: British Columbia US: Montana	480 mi (770 km)	Columbia River	major tributary of Columbia River, early home to Native Americans
Willamette River	US: Oregon	187 mi (301 km)	Columbia River	well known vineyards around river
Delaware River	US: New York, New Jersey, Pennsylvania, Delaware, Maryland	301 mi (484 km)	Delaware Bay and Atlantic Ocean	shores home to Native Americans, associated with several American Revolution battles and Washington Crossing the Delaware
Brandywine River	US: Pennsylvania, Delaware	20 mi (32 km)	Christina River, Delaware River	designated Pennsylvania Scenic Rivers, associated with the Battle of Brandywine
Schuylkill River	US: Pennsylvania	135 mi (217 km)	Delaware River	Philadelphia
Fraser River	Canada: British Columbia	854 mi (1,374 km)	Strait of Georgia Pacific Ocean	longest river in British Columbia, visited by Spanish explorers in 1792
Thompson River	Canada: British Columbia	304 mi (489 km)	Fraser River	evidence of prehistoric settlements along river
Chilcotin River	Canada: British Columbia	150 mi (240 km)	Fraser River	important to indigenous people
Nechako River	Canada: British Columbia	321 mi (517 km)	Fraser River	first explored by Europeans in 1806
Hudson River	US: New York, New Jersey	315 mi (507 km)	New York Harbor Atlantic Ocean	explored by Henry Hudson in 1609
Mohawk River	US: New York	149 mi (240 km)	Hudson River	important to transportation and migration
Mackenzie River	Canada: Northwest Territories, Yukon	1,080 mi (1,740 km)	Beaufort Sea Arctic Ocean	longest river in Canada
Liard River	Canada: British Columbia, Northwest Territories	693 mi (1,115 km)	Mackenzie River	marks the north end of the Rocky Mountains
Slave River	Canada: Alberta, Northwest Territories	270 mi (430 km)	Mackenzie River	named for the Slavey people
Peace River	Canada: British Columbia, Alberta	1,195 mi (1,923 km)	Slave River	part of Finlay–Peace–Slave–Mackenzie river system—13th longest in the world, traditional Danezaa people lived along its shores
Athabasca River	Canada: Alberta	765 mi (1,231 km)	Slave River	Canadian Heritage Rivers System
Majorqaq	Greenland: Qeqqata	44 mi (71 km)	Atlantic Ocean	Greenland is considered part of North America physiography. This river is the outflow of a glacier.
Mississippi River	US: Minnesota, Wisconsin, Iowa, Illinois, Missouri, Kentucky, Tennessee, Arkansas, Mississippi, Louisiana	2,320 mi (3,730 km)	Gulf of Mexico	2nd longest river in Northern Americas
Arkansas River	US: Colorado, Kansas, Oklahoma, Arkansas	1,469 mi (2,364 km)	Mississippi River	6th longest river in US
Canadian River	US: Oklahoma, Colorado, New Mexico, Texas	906 mi (1,458 km)	Arkansas River	explored by Spanish in 1601
Cimarron River	US: Colorado, Kansas, New Mexico, Oklahoma	698 mi (1,123 km)	Arkansas River	explored by Francisco Vásquez de Coronado in 1541, no major cities along route
Des Moines River	US: Iowa, Minnesota, Missouri	525 mi (845 km)	Mississippi River	explored by early French explorers
Illinois River	US: Illinois	273 mi (439 km)	Mississippi River	important transportation route
Minnesota River	US: Minnesota	370 mi (600 km)	Mississippi River	longest river within Minnesota
Missouri River	US: Montana, North Dakota, South Dakota, Nebraska, Iowa, Kansas, Missouri	2,341 mi (3,767 km)	Mississippi River	longest river in Northern Americas
Yellowstone River	US: Wyoming, Montana, North Dakota	692 mi (1,114 km)	Missouri River	important transportation route for Native Americans, associated with Yellowstone Park
Platte River	US: Nebraska	310 mi (500 km)	Missouri River	home to Native Americans, first explored by the Spanish in the 1540s
Milk River	Canada: Alberta, US: Montana	792 mi (1,275 km)	Missouri River	subject of 1908 Supreme Court case for Native American rights
Ohio River	US: Pennsylvania, Ohio, West Virginia, Kentucky, Indiana, Illinois	981 mi (1,579 km)	Mississippi River	Native American significance
Allegheny River	US: Pennsylvania, New York	325 mi (523 km)	Ohio River	Native American and early colonial history
Cumberland River	US: Kentucky, Tennessee	688 mi (1,107 km)	Allegheny River	Native American and riverboat significance
Kanawha River	US: West Virginia	97 mi (156 km)	Allegheny River	largest inland waterway in West Virginia
Scioto River	US: Ohio	231 mi (372 km)	Allegheny River	longest river within Ohio
Tennessee River	US:Tennessee, Alabama, Mississippi, Kentucky	652 mi (1,049 km)	Ohio River	Cherokee lived along river, largest Ohio River tributary
Red River of the South	US: Texas, Oklahoma, Arkansas and Louisiana	1,360 mi (2,190 km)	Gulf of Mexico	second largest river basin in the Great Plains, former border with Mexico
Rock River	US: Wisconsin, Illinois	299 mi (481 km)	Mississippi River	notable Rock River Water Trail
Wisconsin River	US: Wisconsin	420 mi (680 km)	Mississippi River	longest river within Wisconsin
Nass River	Canada: British Columbia	270 mi (430 km)	Portland Inlet, Pacific Ocean	volcanic activity near river, salmon fishery
Potomac River	US: West Virginia, Maryland, Virginia, District of Columbia	405 mi (652 km)	Chesapeake Bay, Atlantic Ocean	4th largest drainage basin on the East Coast of the US, largest river in DC, military historical events in US history
Shenandoah River	US: Virginia, West Virginia	56 mi (90 km)	Potomac River	well known since colonial times
Roanoke River	US: Virginia, North Carolina	410 mi (660 km)	Atlantic Ocean	site of early Native American and colonial settlements
Rio Conchos	Mexico: Chihuahua (state)	350 mi (560 km)	Rio Grande	important river in northern Mexico, largest tributary of the Rio Grande
Rio Grande	Mexico: Chihuahua, Coahuila, Nuevo León, Tamaulipas, US: Colorado, New Mexico, Texas	1,896 mi (3,051 km)	Gulf of Mexico	longest US/Mexico border river
Sacramento River	US: California	400 mi (640 km)	Sacramento–San Joaquin River Delta, San Francisco Bay, Pacific Ocean	largest river in California, California Gold Rush
Pit River	US: California	207 mi (333 km)	Sacramento River	Native American home
Feather River	US: California	73 mi (117 km)	Sacramento River	home to the Maidu Native Americans
Saskatchewan	Canada: Manitoba, Saskatchewan	340 mi (550 km)	Lake Winnipeg	important transportation route in Pre-Columbian era, three hydroelectric dams
Skagit River	Canada: British Columbia US: Washington	240 mi (390 km)	Puget Sound, Pacific Ocean	home to Skagit peoples (Upper and Lower tribes
Skeena River	Canada: British Columbia	350 mi (560 km)	Pacific Ocean	2nd longest river in British Columbia
Babine River	Canada: British Columbia	97 mi (156 km)	Skeena River	one of the last unspoiled rivers
St. Johns River	US: Florida	310 mi (500 km)	Atlantic Ocean	longest river within Florida
Saint Lawrence River	Canada: Ontario, Quebec US: New York	310 mi (500 km)	Gulf of St. Lawrence, Atlantic Ocean	connects Great Lakes, provides basis for St. Lawrence Seaway
Cuyahoga River	US: Ohio	84.9 mi (136.6 km)	Saint Lawrence River	1795 western boundary of US, so polluted in 1969 that it caught fire
Detroit River	Canada: Ontario US: Michigan	28 mi (45 km)	Saint Lawrence River	one of world's busiest waterways, border river, designated American Heritage Rivers and Canadian Heritage Rivers System
Fox River	US: Wisconsin	200 mi (320 km)	Green Bay, Lake Michigan	largest tributary of Lake Michigan
Saginaw River	US: Michigan	22 mi (35 km)	Saginaw Bay, Saint Lawrence River	important shipping route
Ottawa River	Canada: Quebec, Ontario	791 mi (1,273 km)	Saint Lawrence River	vital role for Algonquin people, Provincial border
Morice	Canada: British Columbia	150 mi (240 km)	Saint Lawrence River or Skeena River	endangered river, Enbridge pipeline threat
Susquehanna River	US: New York, Pennsylvania, Maryland	444 mi (715 km)	Chesapeake Bay, Atlantic Ocean	longest river on the East-Coast of the US
Yukon River	Canada: Yukon, British Columbia US: Alaska	1,980 mi (3,190 km)	Bering Sea, Pacific Ocean	longest river flowing through Canada and Alaska
Tanana River	US: Alaska	540 mi (870 km)	Yukon River	evidence of Paleo-Arctic human activity, Nenana Ice Classic contest for charity to predict ice-out
Usumacinta River	Mexico: Tabasco, Guatemala	620 mi (1,000 km)	Gulf of Mexico	important to Mayan Civilization
South Saskatchewan River	Canada: Alberta, Saskatchewan	865 mi (1,392 km)	Saskatchewan River	
North Saskatchewan River	Canada: Alberta, Saskatchewan	800 mi (1,300 km)	Saskatchewan River	
Assiniboine River	Canada: Saskatchewan, Manitoba	660 mi (1,060 km)	Red River of the North	
Red River of the North	United States: Minnesota, North Dakota Canada: Manitoba	550 mi (890 km)	Lake Winnipeg	

=== West Indies ===
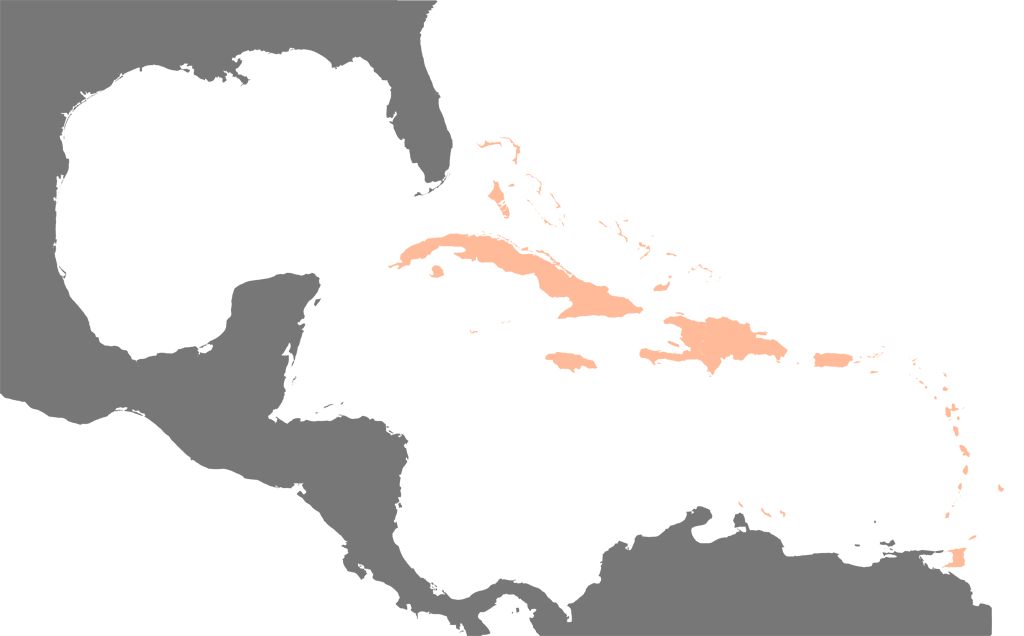
The West Indies in relation to the continental Americas

The significant rivers in the West Indies include the following:

Significant rivers in the West Indies
River	Countries	Length	Significance
Artibonite River	Haiti, Dominican Republic	199 mi (320 km)	longest river in Haiti
Caroni River	Trinidad and Tobago	25 mi (40 km)	longest river in Trinidad and Tobago
Cauto River	Cuba	230 mi (370 km)	longest river in Cuba and the Caribbean/West Indies
Chavón River	Dominican Republic		historically used by pirates to hide treasure
Colonarie River	Saint Vincent and the Grenadines	5 mi (8.0 km)	longest river in Saint Vincent and the Grenadines
Constitution River	Barbados	0.35 mi (0.56 km)	longest river in Barbados
Haina River	Dominican Republic	53 mi (85 km)	noted for discovery of gold in 1496
Layou River	Dominica	14.63 mi (23.54 km)	longest river of Dominica
Nizao River	Dominican Republic		three hydroelectric plants on river, has since dried up due to aggregate extraction
Ozama River: Isabela River	Dominican Republic	92 mi (148 km)	In 1498, Bartolome Colon had a fort built on the Ozama River delta, which would later become the first permanent European settlement in the New World (Santo Domingo).
Rio Minho	Jamaica	57.7 mi (92.9 km)	longest river in Jamaica
Rivière Soliette	Haiti, Dominican Republic (called Arroyo Blanco)		On 24 May 2004, it overran its banks resulting in the death of over one thousand individuals, with hundreds more injured and homeless near the city of Jimani.
Rosseau River	Saint Lucia		longest river in Saint Lucia
Saint Johns River	Grenada		longest river in Grenada
Yaque del Norte River	Dominican Republic	185 mi (298 km)	longest river in the Dominican Republic
Yuna River	Dominican Republic		second longest river in the Dominican Republic

=== Rivers of North and Central America by discharge ===
Largest primary rivers of North and Central America by discharge:
River	Average discharge (m^{3}/s) at mouth
01 Mississippi–Atchafalaya	21,300
02 St Lawrence	17,600
03 Mackenzie	9,800
04 Columbia	7,407
05 Yukon	7,000
06 Nelson–Churchill	4,380
07 Grijalva–Usumacinta	4,028
08 Fraser	3,944
09 La Grande–Eastmain–Rupert–Caniapiscau	3,808 rio grande 2,403
10 Mobile–Alabama–Tombigbee	2,118
11 Churchill	1,932
12 Kuskokwim	1,897
13 Skeena	1,760
14 Copper	1,700
15 Koksoak	1,600
16 Stikine	1,600
17 San Juan	1,590
18 Thelon	1,538
19 Papaloapán	1,461
20 Susitna	1,450
21 Moose	1,440
22 Albany	1,420
23 Susquehanna	1,199
24 Nottaway	1,190
25 St John	1,189
26 Sacramento–San Joaquin	1,185
27 Coatzacoalcos	1,163
28 Nushagak	1,000
45 Hudson	620

== South America ==
Amazon River basin

The following are some of the significant rivers in South America

- Aconcagua - Chile
- Amazon - Ecuador, Peru, Bolivia, Venezuela, Colombia, Brazil (4,086 mi (6,576 km)) (flows into the Atlantic Ocean)
  - Solimões - name given in Brazil to the portions of the Amazon upstream of its confluence with the Rio Negro
    - Ucayali - Peru
      - Tambo - Peru
        - Ene - Peru
          - Mantaro - Peru
          - Apurímac - Peru
      - Urubamba - Peru
    - Marañón - Peru
      - Pastaza - Ecuador, Peru
      - Huallaga - Peru
  - Putumayo - Colombia, Peru, Brazil
  - Juruá - Peru, Brazil
  - Caquetá - Colombia, Brazil
  - Purus - Peru, Brazil
  - Rio Negro - Venezuela, Colombia, Brazil
    - Casiquiare Canal - a large natural canal in Venezuela connecting the Rio Negro with the upper Orinoco River
    - Vaupés - Colombia, Brazil
    - Rio Branco - Brazil
  - Madeira - Bolivia, Brazil
    - Beni - Bolivia
      - Madre de Dios - Peru, Bolivia
    - Mamoré - Bolivia, Brazil
      - Guaporé - Brazil, Bolivia
  - Tapajós - Brazil
  - Xingu - Brazil
  - Tocantins - Brazil
    - Araguaia - Brazil
- Apure - Venezuela
- Atrato - Colombia
- Baudó - Colombia
- Bío-Bío - Chile
  - Malleco - Chile
- Caroní - Venezuela
- Catatumbo - Colombia, Venezuela
  - Zulia - Venezuela, Colombia
    - Sardinata - Colombia
- Cauca - Colombia
- Cautín - Chile
- Chubut - Argentina
- Colorado - Argentina
- Elqui - Chile
- Essequibo - Guyana
- Itata - Chile
  - Ñuble - Chile
- Loa - Chile
- Magdalena - Colombia
- Maipo - Chile
  - Mapocho - Chile
- Maule - Chile
  - Loncomilla - Chile
    - Achibueno - Chile
      - Ancoa - Chile
    - Longaví - Chile
    - Perquilauquén - Chile
      - Purapel - Chile
    - Putagán - Chile
  - Melado - Chile
- Maullín - Chile
- Maroni - Suriname, French Guiana
- Mira - Colombia
- Orinoco - Colombia, Venezuela
  - Apure - Venezuela
  - Arauca - Colombia, Venezuela
  - Meta - Colombia, Venezuela
  - Guaviare - Colombia
  - Meta - Colombia
  - Tomo - Colombia
  - Vichada - Colombia
- Parnaiba - Brazil
- Rapel - Chile
- Reñihue - Chile
- Río Bueno - Chile
  - Rahue - Chile
    - Damas - Chile
- Río de la Plata It is not really a river but the lower stretch of the Paraná and the estuary that forms after its confluence with the Uruguay
  - Paraná - Brazil, Argentina, Paraguay
  - Uruguay - Brazil, Argentina, Uruguay
- Palena - Chile
- Patía - Colombia
- Petrohué - Chile
- Puelo - Chile
- São Francisco - Brazil
- San Jorge - Colombia
- San Juan - Colombia
- Sinú - Colombia
- Toltén - Chile
  - Trancura - Chile
- Valdivia - Chile
  - Calle-Calle - Chile
    - San Pedro - Chile
      - Enco - Chile
        - Llanquihue - Chile
          - Huahum - Chile, Argentina
            - Chapelco - Argentina
          - Liquiñe - Chile
  - Cau-Cau - Chile
  - Cruces - Chile
  - Cutipay - Chile
  - Futa - Chile
- Yelcho - Chile
  - Futaleufú - Chile

=== Rivers of South America by discharge ===
Largest primary rivers of South America by discharge:
River	Average discharge (m^{3}/s) at mouth
01 Amazon	209,000
02 Orinoco	39,000
03 Paraná	19,706
04 Tocantins	12,369
05 Magdalena	8,371
06 Uruguay	7,058
07 Essequibo	5,650

(continues)
River	Average discharge (m^{3}/s) at mouth
07 Essequibo	5,650
08 Atrato	4,900
09 São Francisco	3,300
10 San Juan	2,649
11 Jacuí	2,327
12 Maroni	1,871
13 Courantyne	1,720
14 Guayas	1,655
15 Araguari	1,604
16 Guamá	1,542
17 Patía	1,453
18 Oyapock	1,273
19 Doce	1,241
20 São Gonçalo	1,186
21 Paraíba do Sul	1,118
22 Río Negro	1,112
23 Catatumbo	1,024
24 Baudó	1,023
25 Esmeraldas	1,011
26 Parnaíba	1,000

== See also ==
- List of rivers of the Americas by coastline
- Lists of rivers
- List of waterways
- Paleo-Bell River (hypothesized ancient river)
