= Neltume Lake =

Lake in Chile

- Lago Neltume (Spanish)
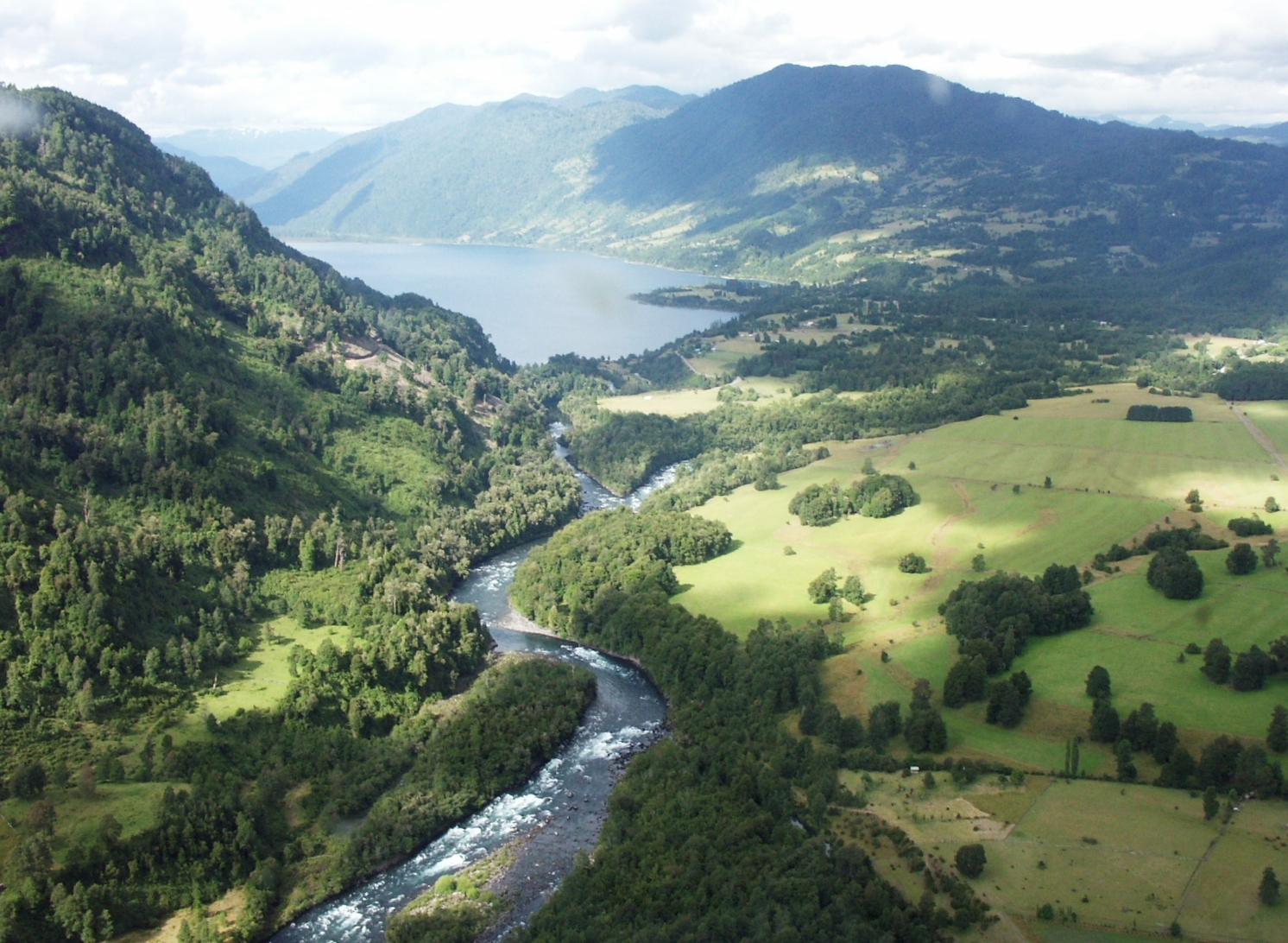
- The beginning of the Llanquihue River at the confluence of the Neltume and Fui Rivers.

- Location within Chile
- Location: Valdivia Province
- Coordinates: 39°48′S 71°57′W
- Type: Glacial
- Primary outflows: Neltume River
- Catchment area: 763 km^{2} (295 sq mi)
- Basin countries: Chile
- Max. length: 6.3 km (3.9 mi)
- Max. width: 2.4 km (1.5 mi)
- Surface area: 9.8 km^{2} (3.8 sq mi)
- Average depth: 61.2 m (201 ft)
- Max. depth: 90 m (300 ft)
- Water volume: 0.6 km^{3} (0.14 cu mi)
- Surface elevation: 197 m (646 ft)
- Settlements: Neltume is the nearest town

Neltume Lake (Spanish: Lago Neltume) is one of the "Seven Lakes" in Panguipulli municipality, southern Chile. The lake is of glacial origin and it is enclosed by mountain ranges of the Andes. It is nearby the small town of Neltume that bears the same name.
