= Naguilian =

Naguilian may refer to the following places in the Philippines:

- Naguilian, a municipality in the province of Isabela
- Naguilian, a municipality in the province of La Union
- Naguilan, a barangay in Calayan, Cagayan
- Naguilian, a road in Luzon island

== Other uses ==
- Naguilán, a river in Chile
