= Juan Manqueante =

Juan Manqueante was a Mapuche cacique from Mariquina in the mid-17th century. While he is a historical figure there are many legends and tales associated to him. In local lore Manqueante is considered him the most notable person born in the lands of Mariquina. There is a street in San José named after him.

== Dealing with the Dutch ==
At the time the Dutch led by Elias Herckmans were in the ruins of Valdivia Manquente approached the Dutch expressing his support for them. Despite being in friendly terms with the Dutch staunchly refused them to access the gold mines of Madre de Dios in his lands. Manquente explained this by telling the Dutch of his people's negative experiences of Spanish gold mining. As the Dutch expedition to Valdivia planned to retreat back to Brazil Manquante provided relief to the hungry Dutch in the form of cattle. This relief was only temporary since Manqueante probably considered it a farewell gift. Before leaving, Manqueante was contacted by Herckmans to let him know that the Dutch intended to return with 1,000 African slaves to take care of mining and agriculture in order to leave the indigenous peoples free of forced labour. This promise was never fulfilled. Spanish enquiries about Dutch activities in southern Chile led Gaspar Álvarez, a soldier, to the recovery of a letter from Herckmans to Manqueante where the Dutch explained, with sincerity, the motive behind their withdrawal. The Spanish however distrusted the letter as possible disinformation.

== Alignment with the Spanish ==
Manqueante aligned himself with the Spanish from Dutch departure in 1643 to the Mapuche uprising of 1655. This alignment turned into a concrete military alliance as Manqueante requested the Spanish to build a fort in Mariquina in Cruces River. The fort was likely built in the spring and summer of 1649–1650 and allowed Manqueante to dispose of Spanish soldiers to fend off against the incursions of rival Mapuche-Huilliche. Manqueante's chief enemies were three rival chiefs, all them from the same Aillarehue as him. This group of three was headed by Curimanque who was staunchly anti-Spanish.

The Spanish benefited from the alliance by gaining an ally against the Dutch, This alliance gave origin to a legend that holds Manqueante died by turning into stone as he would have betrayed his people by allying with the Spanish.

Manqueante was a catholic Christian according to contemporary Jesuit missionary and chronicler Diego de Rosales.

== Bibliography ==
- Barros Arana, Diego. "Capítulo XI". Historia general de Chile (in Spanish). Vol. Tomo cuarto (Digital edition based on the second edition of 2000 ed.). Alicante: Biblioteca Virtual Miguel de Cervantes.
- Lane, Kris E. (1998). Pillaging the Empire: Piracy in the Americas 1500–1750. Armonk, N.Y.: M.E. Sharpe. ISBN 978-0-76560-256-5.
- Rivera Gutiérrez, Gabriel (2018). Entre circas y cañuelas historia de los pirquineros auríferos de Mariquina, siglos XVI al XXI (in Spanish). San José de la Mariquina.
