= Villa Cayumapu =

- Interactive map of Villa Cayumapu
- Coordinates: 39°44′4.59″S 73°7′46.69″W
- Region: Los Ríos
- Province: Valdivia
- Municipalidad: Valdivia
- Comuna: Valdivia

Government
  - Type: Municipalidad
  - Alcalde: Carla Amtmann
- Elevation: 13 m (43 ft)

Population (2017 census )
  - Total: 291
- Time zone: UTC−04:00 (Chilean Standard)
  - Summer (DST): UTC−03:00 (Chilean Daylight)
- Area code: Country + town = 56 + 63

Villa Cayumapu is a hamlet north of the city of Valdivia near Pichoy Airport and next to Cayumapu River. It had 291 inhabitants as of 2017.
