= Iñaque River =

River in Chile

Coordinates: 39°38′32.53″S 72°56′18.41″W

Location
- Country: Chile

Physical characteristics
- Mouth
  - location: Pichoy River
  - elevation: 12 m
- Basin size: 536 km^{2}

Iñaque River (Spanish: río Iñaque) is a river in Los Ríos Region, Chile. The river originates near the town of Panguipulli and flows west passing through the town of Máfil before changing name to Pichoy River. The river has a pluvial regime. A hanging bridge over the river exists since 1931.

The river has been mined for alluvial gold at Madre de Dios.

== Bibliography ==
- Fierro Ascencio, Marcia Evelyn (2009). Máfil en la Historia y la Memoria 1930-1964 (in Spanish). Editor sin identificar. ISBN 978-956-8803-00-1.
