= Isla del Rey, Chile =

Island in Chile

Isla del Rey
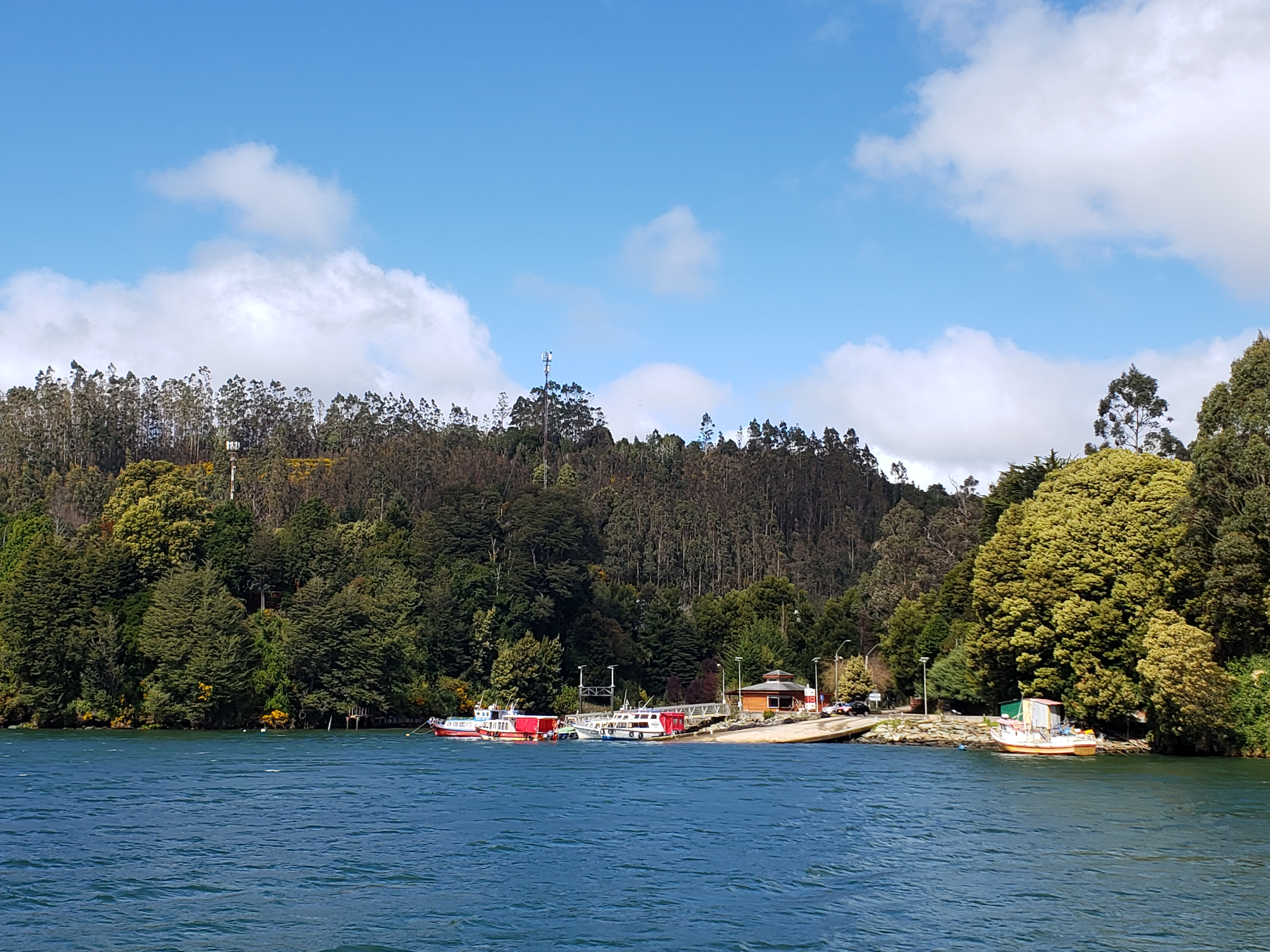
- View of Isla del Rey from Valdivia River
- Interactive map of Isla del Rey

Geography
- Coordinates: 39°53′S 73°19′W
- Adjacent to: Valdivia River

Administration
- Chile
- Region: Los Ríos
- Province: Valdivia
- Commune: Corral

Isla del Rey (Spanish for King's Island) is a river island the largest island in Los Ríos Region of Chile. It is located near the outflow of Valdivia River into Corral Bay. To the east, south and southwest the island is separated from the mainland by Tornagaleones River. To the north it is bounded by Valdivia River. Next to it, to the east, lies Guacamayo Island. The island is described in Diccionario Geográfico de la República de Chile (1899) as "somewhat mountainous, high, with some forest and various streams that descend towards its margins".

From the Spanish conquest in the mid-16th century up to the Spanish reoccupation in the mid-17th century it was known as isla de Diego Ramírez after a Spanish settler, thereafter it acquired its current name.

== See also ==
- Teja Island
