= Rivers of America =

Rivers of America may refer to:

- List of rivers of the Americas
- Rivers of America (Disney), an attraction at Disney theme parks
- Rivers of America Series, a series of books on American rivers
