= Dutch expedition to Valdivia =

1643 failed expedition to Chile

- Part of the Eighty Years' War
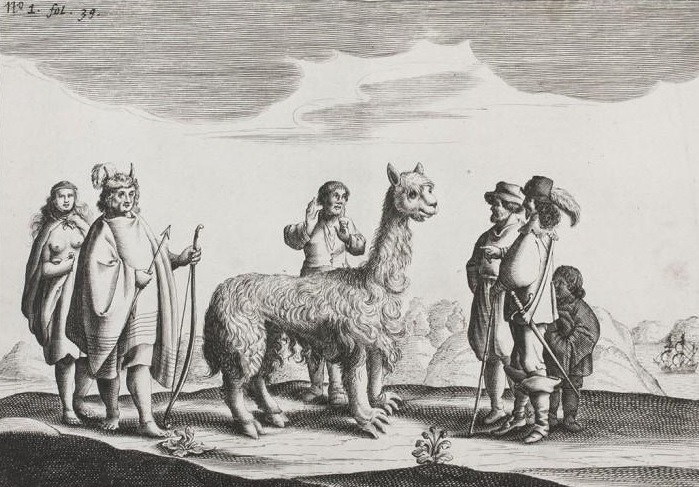
- Detail from the 1646 book Journael Ende Historis Verhael van de Reyse gedaen by Oosten de Straet le Maire, naer de Custen van Chili, onder het beleyt van den heer Generael Hendrick Brouwer, Inden Jare 1643
Date	6 November 1642 – 28 December 1643 (1 year, 1 month, 3 weeks and 1 day)
Location	The Pacific coast of Spanish South America
Result	Dutch failure: The Dutch leave Valdivia and then it is occupied by the Spanish

Belligerents
Dutch Republic; Huilliche; Mapuche	Spain

Commanders and leaders
Hendrik Brouwer # Elias Herckmans	Chiloé forces: Andres Herrera †; Fernando de Alvarado; Response (1644–1645): (Spain) Pedro de Toledo; (Spain) Antonio de Toledo; (Spain) Alonso de Mujica; (Spain) F. López de Zúñiga; (Spain) Juan de Acevedo

Strength
Several ships 600 men	

The Dutch expedition to Valdivia was a naval expedition, commanded by Hendrik Brouwer, sent by the Dutch Republic in 1643 to establish a base of operations and a trading post on the southern coast of Chile. With Spain and the Dutch Republic at war, the Dutch wished to take over the ruins of the abandoned Spanish city of Valdivia. The expedition sacked the Spanish settlements of Carelmapu and Castro in the Chiloé Archipelago before sailing to Valdivia, having the initial support of the local natives. The Dutch arrived in Valdivia on 24 August 1643 and named the colony Brouwershaven after Brouwer, who had died several weeks earlier. The short-lived colony was abandoned on 28 October 1643. Nevertheless, the occupation caused great alarm among Spanish authorities. The Spanish resettled Valdivia and began the construction of an extensive network of fortifications in 1645 to prevent a similar intrusion. Although contemporaries considered the possibility of a new incursion, the expedition was the last one undertaken by the Dutch on the west coast of the Americas.

== Background ==
On 23 December 1598, native Mapuche warriors led by Pelantaro ambushed and wiped out a Spanish column at the Battle of Curalaba. Following this, a general uprising developed among the Mapuche and Huilliche people of southern Chile. The subsequent Arauco War was to smolder for over 250 years but its immediate effect was the so-called "Destruction of the Seven Cities": the Spanish settlements of Angol, La Imperial, Osorno, Santa Cruz de Oñez, Valdivia and Villarrica were either destroyed or abandoned. Only Chillán and Concepción resisted the Mapuche sieges and attacks. With the exception of the Chiloé Archipelago, all the Chilean territory south of Bío Bío River became free of Spanish rule. The abandoned city of Valdivia turned into an attractive site for Spain's enemies to control since it would allow them to establish a base amidst Spain's Chilean possessions.

In 1600, local Huilliches joined the Dutch corsair Baltazar de Cordes in attacking the Spanish settlement of Castro in Chiloé. While this was an opportunistic assault, the Spanish correctly believed the Dutch could attempt to ally with the Mapuches and establish a stronghold in southern Chile. Over time, the Spanish became aware of actual Dutch plans to establish themselves at the ruins of Valdivia and so attempted to re-establish Spanish rule there before the arrival of the Dutch. These efforts were thwarted in the 1630s by the impossibility of establishing an overland route through the territory of the hostile Mapuches. The ruins of Valdivia, at the head of its splendid natural harbour, remained a tempting target for Spain's enemies.

The Dutch Republic, in constant war with Spain on different fronts, had refrained from carrying out expeditions against the Spanish possessions in the American Pacific after the disaster of the Jacques l'Hermite expedition in 1624, concentrating on America all its efforts in the conquest of a part of Brazil. However, they tried to promote uprisings among the Criollos and natives of the American coasts, which although unsuccessful, generated alarm among the Spanish. But when, at the beginning of the 1640s, the situation of the Spanish Empire deteriorated dramatically, as the war that was being fought with France was joined by the Catalan Revolt and the Portuguese Restoration War, the Dutch saw once again the advisability of founding establishments on the western coast of America.

In the context of the Arauco war, the Spanish authorities of the Captaincy General of Chile had established a peace treaty with the Mapuche warlords in 1641, to concentrate Spanish resources on the most important European affairs.

== Expedition ==
The location of Valdivia, Carelmapu and Staten Island within the modern boundaries of Chile and Argentina

In 1642, the Dutch East India Company (VOC) joined with the Dutch West Indies Company (GWC) in organising an expedition under Hendrik Brouwer to Chile to establish a trading base at Valdivia, long abandoned. Brouwer, a veteran navigator and member of the GWC, who decided to command the expedition despite his advanced age, was the main promoter of this project. The expedition was small compared to the Dutch forces that had taken over much of Portuguese Brazil, but it was anticipated that it would be supported by the fiercely anti-Spanish Mapuche-Huilliche confederation (Note: While lacking state organization Mapuches warring the Spanish had achieved a "supra-local level of military solidarity" by the early 17th century.) once it reached Chile. The expedition was issued formal instructions to capture the gold mines believed to be abundant in the area, capture Valdivia, make alliances with indigenous peoples, the Mapuches and the Huilliches, and to explore Santa María Island. Except for Brouwer and other leaders, the true objectives were not known to the participants of the expedition; they were led to believe that it was a raiding and trading voyage. The distant objectives of this expedition were to create a military base in Valdivia and then attack the Viceroyalty of Peru, the Spanish jewel of the American Pacific.

Brouwer and a small fleet of an unknown number of vessels left the Netherlands on 6 November 1642 with 250 men. The fleet called at Mauritsstad (modern Recife) in Dutch Brazil where John Maurice of Nassau resupplied it and provided an additional 350 men. As the expedition was aimed at cold southern latitudes woolen clothes were rationed among the crew and passengers.

While rounding Cape Horn, the expedition failed to enter Le Maire Strait in an attempt to replicate the route taken by Jacob Le Maire and Willem Schouten in 1616. Northerly winds pushed the expedition as far south as 61°59 S where icebergs were abundant before a southerly wind that begun on 7 April allowed the fleet to advance west. This way the expedition established that Staten Island was not part of the hypothetical Southern Land, since it sailed east and south of the island. However, the supply ship Orange Tree had become detached near Cape Horn but managed to return to Recife with a broken mast. The loss of this ship strained the expedition's supplies.

=== Chiloé ===
In May 1643, the expedition arrived at the Chiloé Archipelago. The Spanish at the small fortified settlement of Carelmapu spotted the Dutch on 20 May and sent infantry and cavalry to prevent them from landing. In the face of this threat, the Dutch had to land further away from Carelmapu at Punta de la Arena. With a force of 200 musketeers and arquebusiers the Dutch advanced on Carelmapu, starting bushfires to clear their way. The Spanish emptied the fort of Carelmapu and hid their women and children in the forests. After the well-ordered Dutch troops opened fire on the Spanish forces they retreated hastily into the woods. The Dutch entered the fort of Carelmapu, capturing much equipment, supplies and horses. A counter-attack by the Spanish ended in failure and the death of the Spanish Governor of Chiloé, Andrés Herrera. Carelmapu was subsequently sacked and its Catholic church vandalised. The plunder of Carelmapu gave the Dutch the opportunity to replenish their depleted food supplies at the cost of revealing their presence to the Spanish. However, in Carelmapu the Dutch learned that their arrival had been expected as they recovered a letter sent to the settlement's corregidor from Pedro de Toledo, the Spanish viceroy in Peru, warning of a Dutch expedition and ordering the use of a scorched earth strategy against them. The Dutch captured Spaniards, including Antonio Sánchez Jinés who later guided them to the Spanish settlement of Castro and other places in the archipelago. Sánchez Jinés was particularly useful as he spoke indigenous Mapudungun.

Fernando de Alvarado succeeded Andrés Herrera as military commander of the Spanish in Chiloé. De Alvarado organized the remaining troops in Carelmapu and Calbuco aiming to prevent an indigenous uprising and harass the Dutch invaders. He moved quickly through the forested paths that led south from Carelmapu and reached Castro before the Dutch did so. Amidst heavy rains de Alvarado ordered the city of Castro to be dismantled and the population to hide in the forests. Buildings in Castro had their straw roofs removed as well as the wood shingle roof of the church to render them useless as shelters and more difficult to burn. As in Carelmapu, the Dutch sacked the settlement upon arrival and vandalised its church. According to contemporary Spanish chronicler Diego de Rosales, the Dutch insulted the prisoners in Spanish, Latin and Portuguese, called them cowards, and encouraged them to reveal where they could find their women. In Castro the Dutch left an inscription insulting the inhabitants of the city.

After Castro the Dutch went back north pillaging the countryside managing to gather chickens, sheep, pigs and many apples. (Note: In contrast to other Mediterranean crops apple trees and pigs had proven a successful Spanish introduction to local agriculture. Similarly, sheep were slowly replacing earlier chilihueque livestock. Otherwise, Chiloé Archipelago is mostly known for its native potatoes and shellfish.) Because the inhabitants of Chiloé Archipelago had hidden, the Dutch met few people after leaving Castro. (Note: An exception to this was Luisa Pizarro an old woman they found in Quinchao who told the Dutch about the destruction of Osorno forty years earlier.)

In July, the expedition returned to Carelmapu where 470 Huilliches agreed to join the expedition to Valdivia. The expedition spent May to mid-August, the southern hemisphere winter, resting, reorganising and repairing ships and equipment. It also gathered intelligence on the Chiloé Archipelago. On 7 August, Brouwer died in Puerto Inglés. Maurice of Nassau had foreseen that this might happen and had provided the expedition with a sealed letter to be opened in this eventuality. The letter transferred command to Vice-General Elias Herckmans, who had until then been in charge of the ship Vlissingen; he had previously been governor of Paraíba.

=== Spanish envoys to Peru ===
Meanwhile, De Alvarado arranged for the fast assembly of a sailing vessel in southern Chiloé, which as soon as ready hastily sailed to Arauco to alert the Spanish in mainland Chile. To avoid interception by the Dutch envoys had to sail round Chiloé Island from the south through the Gulf of Corcovado. This ship was led by captain Domingo Lorenzo and having on board also Jesuit missionary Domingo Lázaro and Dutch prisoner Joost Lambertsz who had been captured in Carelmapu. Reaching Arauco in late August safely was in itself an accomplishment as sailing in the Roaring Forties in the Austral winter was dangerous given it was a season of rain and storms. Once Spanish authorities in Central Chile learned about the Dutch expedition captain Alonso de Mujica y Buitrón was sent with Father Lázaro to Lima to give the news to the Viceroy of Peru.

=== Valdivia ===
The expedition set sail for Valdivia on 21 August and reached their destination within three days. Herckmans arrived at the mouth of Valdivia River in Corral Bay on 24 August. From there the Dutch had difficulties sailing up the Valdivia River to the site of Valdivia as they lacked experience of sailing on rivers. At Tornagaleones River one ship ran aground on a rocky shallow. This ship was dismantled. The ruins of Valdivia were reached by the two remaining ships four days later on 28 August. Upon arrival curious Mapuches gathered to watch them. The ships were surrounded by canoes. Reportedly some natives boarded the ships and stole iron objects, including a valuable compass.

In Valdivia the Dutch established a new settlement, which Herckmans named Brouwershaven after Brouwer. On 29 August the Dutch had met with local tribal leader Manquipillan and his host. In the meeting the Dutch held a long discourse in which they highlighted what they believed was the common enmity to Spain; later gifts were given by the Dutch. At the end a friendly relationship had been established with Manquipillan. A new solemn meeting was held on 3 September, with an even greater assistance. In this meeting a formal alliance was established between the Dutch and local Mapuches. Local Mapuches promised to help the Dutch with the construction of a fort and to give provisions for the nascent colony. The embalmed body of Brouwer was buried in Valdivia on 16 September there.

A ship under Captain Elbert Crispijnsen was sent back to Dutch Brazil on 25 September to report on the positive development of the colony and request additional supplies. In Valdivia the Dutch began the construction of a fort. A major setback to the Dutch was that they had also failed to find the anticipated gold mines. The Mapuches began to realise the Dutch had no plans of leaving and their search for gold caused suspicion, leading the locals to halt their deliveries of food. The Mapuche chief Juan Manqueante, from Mariquina, who was in friendly terms with the Dutch, staunchly refused them to access the gold mines of Madre de Dios in his lands. Manqueante told the Dutch of his people's negative experiences of Spanish gold mining. Other contributing factors behind the cold attitude of local Mapuches may have been the Dutch rhetoric about war with Spain, which may have upset the Mapuches of Valdivia who had lived in peace for about forty years and the fact that local Mapuches may not have seen any significant difference between the Dutch and Spanish. Local Mapuches justified not sending provisions by claiming they did not have enough food for themselves. The Dutch were demoralised by the scarcity of food and lack of comfort. A mutiny begun to smolder and some Dutch left the encampment at night for the woods with the final aim of surrendering to the Spanish in Concepción.

Spanish interpreter Antonio Sánchez Jinés warned the Dutch of the changing attitudes, yet the Dutch leadership chose to turn a blind eye to this issue. Sánchez Jinés feared for his life as he told the Dutch of Mapuches wanting to kill him blaming him for having told the Dutch about gold riches and guiding them to Valdivia.

Local Mapuches went further to attempt to have part of the Dutch to depart to crush an alleged Spanish troop gathering near La Imperial. Having been told that the information about the Spanish was false and an ambush, Herckmans called for a council among the Dutch officers on 15 October. The council took the decision to retreat to Constantino Island (Note: This was the name of Mancera Island, Isla Mancera, at the time. The island lies in Corral Bay not far from Valdivia.) thus abandoning Valdivia. The next day, 16 October, four deserters were arrested and two of them executed with firearms. On 26 October more deserters and accomplices were tried, resulting in various executions.

Yet before leaving Valdivia the Dutch called local Mapuches for a meeting where Herckmans made them aware that treacherous attitudes had not gone unnoticed. Nevertheless, following this the Dutch gave away some of their antique weapons and armour including chain mails and morions in exchange for provisions. Likely it was also their hope these weapons would be put into use against the Spanish.

Juan Manqueante provided relief to the hungry Dutch in the form of cattle. This relief was only temporary since Manqueante probably considered it a farewell gift. Before leaving, Manqueante was contacted by Herckmans to let him know that the Dutch intended to return with 1,000 African slaves to take care of mining and agriculture in order to leave the indigenous peoples free of forced labour. This promise was never fulfilled.

=== Return to Brazil ===
The expedition finally left Chile on 28 October and reached Recife on 28 December, three weeks after the arrival of Crispijnsen. In Brazil the reinforcements and provisions asked for by Crispijnsen were ready to sail for Valdivia and John Maurice of Nassau was disappointed to learn that the colony had been dismantled. The failure of the expedition was blamed on Herckmans who died soon afterwards. The Pernambucan Insurrection broke out in Dutch Brazil in 1645, recapturing most of the Dutch territory and putting great pressure on the local Dutch leaders. With no resources to spare, Dutch pretensions in Chile were at an end.

== Spanish response ==
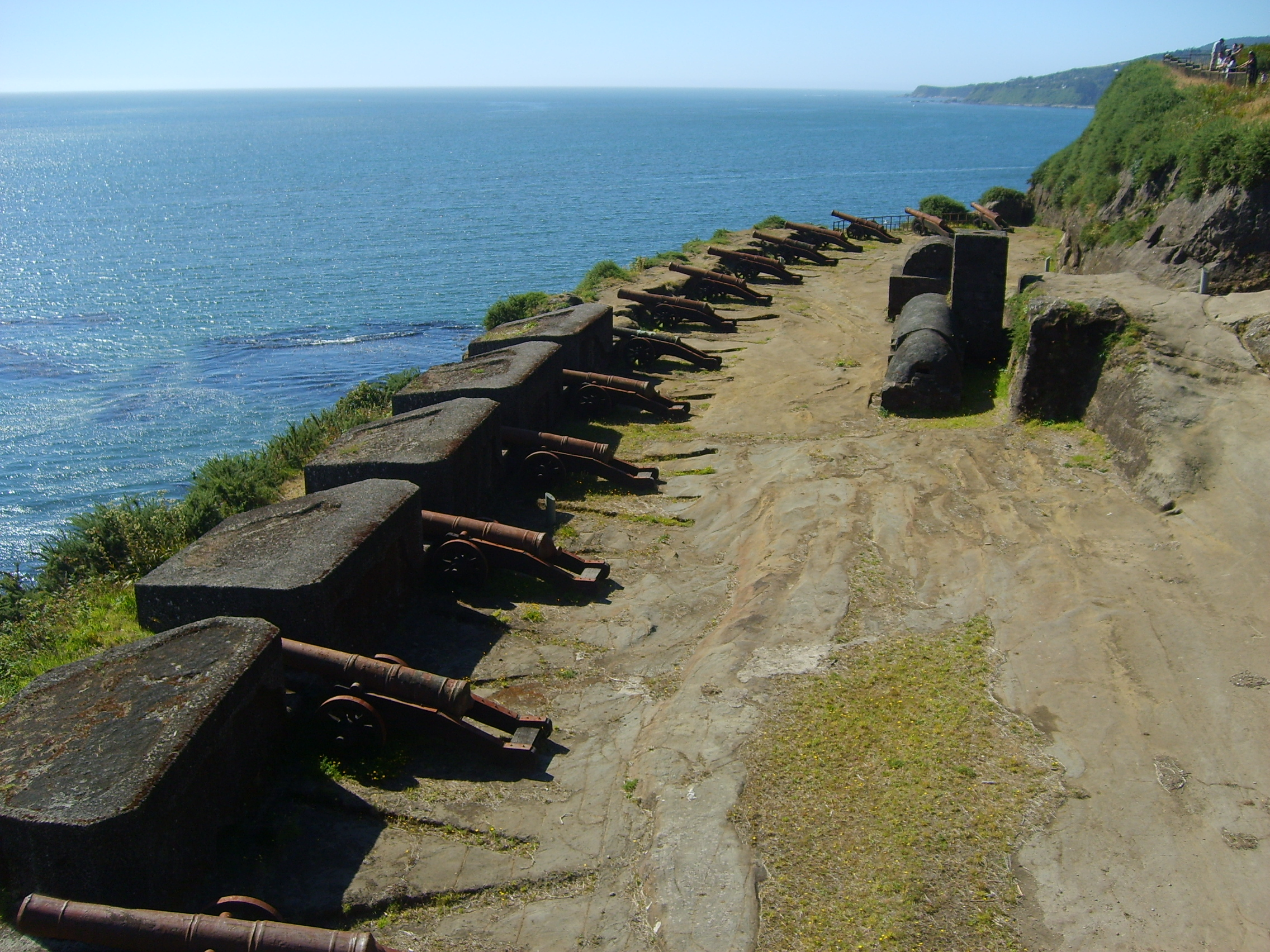
A view of Niebla Fort, one of the many forts the Spanish established around Corral Bay following the Dutch occupation of Valdivia

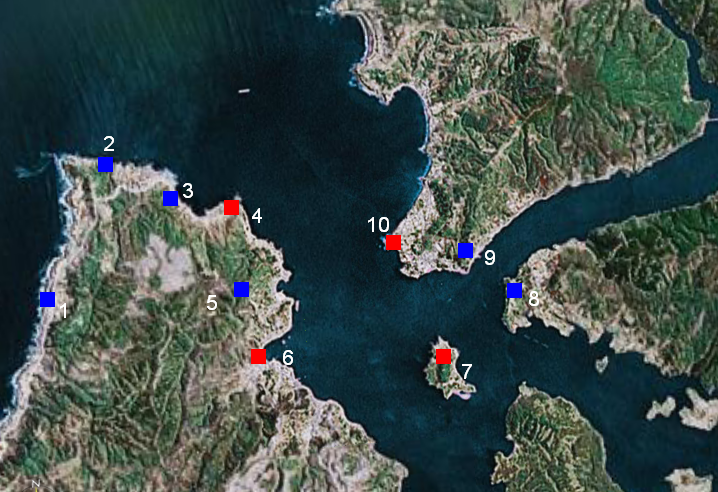
Satellite imagery of Corral Bay, showing the location of the finished coastal defences. The four largest forts are marked with red.

Francisco López de Zúñiga, the Governor of Chile, dispatched Juan de Acevedo in charge of a ship to Valdivia to gather information on 30 April 1644. De Acevedo reached Corral Bay by May noticing that the Dutch were nowhere to be found.

Having heard from Juan Manqueante that the Dutch planned to return, Pedro de Toledo conceived an occupation of Valdivia by a synchronous advance by the Spanish army in Chile by land and by a fleet sent from Peru. De Toledo ordered 2,000 men to march over land from Central Chile to resettle Valdivia and fortify it. These troops penetrated Mapuche territory following the coast south and reached Toltén River on 9 February 1645. Reaching so far south was a feat in itself since the Spanish had not been around these places in the last 50 years. At this point the army had met considerable harassment from the Mapuches. The killing of scouting auxiliaries in conjunction with uncertainty regarding the arrival by sea of the Spanish from Peru made López de Zúñiga retreat back north. (Note: This failure would cost López de Zúñiga a heavy price as De Toledo made severe accusations against him. At the end López de Zúñiga would have to justify his failure to reach Valdivia before the King of Spain.)

De Toledo's naval expedition was made up of twenty ships and 1,000 men from El Callao in Peru. The large fleet, which gained a further two ships in Chile, was unprecedented in the region and astounded contemporary observers. It arrived at Valdivia in February 1645 without incident and disembarked the soldiers with their equipment and supplies. The Spanish disinterred and burned Brouwer's body.

The soldiers of the new garrison and the artisans dispatched with them commenced construction of a system of defensive fortifications. These would become the Valdivian Fort System, the most important defensive complex of the American South Pacific coast. It is an exceptional example of the Hispanic-American school of fortification. The building and maintenance of the fortifications became a heavy burden for the Spanish colonial finances but this was felt necessary in order to defend the southern approaches to Peru, the colony which, along with Mexico, constituted the main source of wealth for the Spanish Crown. Investments in the defense of Corral Bay were validated in 1670 when a fully armed English ship commanded by John Narborough arrived to the bay, causing concern he might launch an assault. Eventually, Narborough left as quickly as he had arrived without disclosing the reason for his presence, greatly confusing the Spanish authorities.

Manqueante is said to have remained aligned with the Spanish from the Dutch departure in 1643 to the Mapuche uprising of 1655. (Note: This alliance gave origin to a legend that holds he died by turning into stone as he would have betrayed his people by allying with the Spanish.)

== Bibliography ==
- Barros Arana, Diego (2000) [1884]. "Capítulo XI". Historia General de Chile (in Spanish). Vol. IV (2 ed.). Santiago, Chile: Editorial Universitaria. ISBN 978-956-11-1535-4.
- Guarda, Gabriel (1953). Historia de Valdivia 1552–1952 (in Spanish). Santiago, Chile: Imprenta Cultura.
- Bengoa, José (2003). Historia de los antiguos mapuches del sur (in Spanish). Santiago: Catalonia. ISBN 978-956-8303-02-0.
- Clark Berger, Eugene (2006). Permanent war on Peru's periphery: Frontier identity and the politics of conflict in 17th century Chile (PDF) (PhD). Vanderbilt University.
- Dillehay, Tom (2007). Monuments, empires, and resistance: The Araucanian polity and ritual narratives. Cambridge University Press. ISBN 978-110-7407-74-9.
- Lane, Kris E. (1998). Pillaging the Empire: Piracy in the Americas 1500–1750. Armonk, N.Y.: M.E. Sharpe. ISBN 978-0-76560-256-5.
- Montt Pinto, Isabel (1971). Breve Historia de Valdivia (in Spanish). Buenos Aires: Editorial Francisco de Aguirre. OCLC 1397610. Archived from the original on 18 February 2007.
- Rivera Gutiérrez, Gabriel (2018). Entre circas y cañuelas historia de los pirquineros auríferos de Mariquina, siglos XVI al XXI (in Spanish). San José de la Mariquina.
- de Rosales, Diego (1878). Vicuña Mackenna, Benjamín (ed.). Historia general de el reyno de Chile. Flandes indiano (PDF) (in Spanish). Vol. III. Valparaíso: Imprenta de El Mercurio. OCLC 55283128.
- Villalobos, Sergio; Silva, Osvaldo; Silva, Fernando; Estelle, Patricio (1974). Historia de Chile (in Spanish) (14th ed.). Santiago de Chile: Editorial Universitaria. ISBN 978-956-11-1163-9.
