= Pichoy Airport =

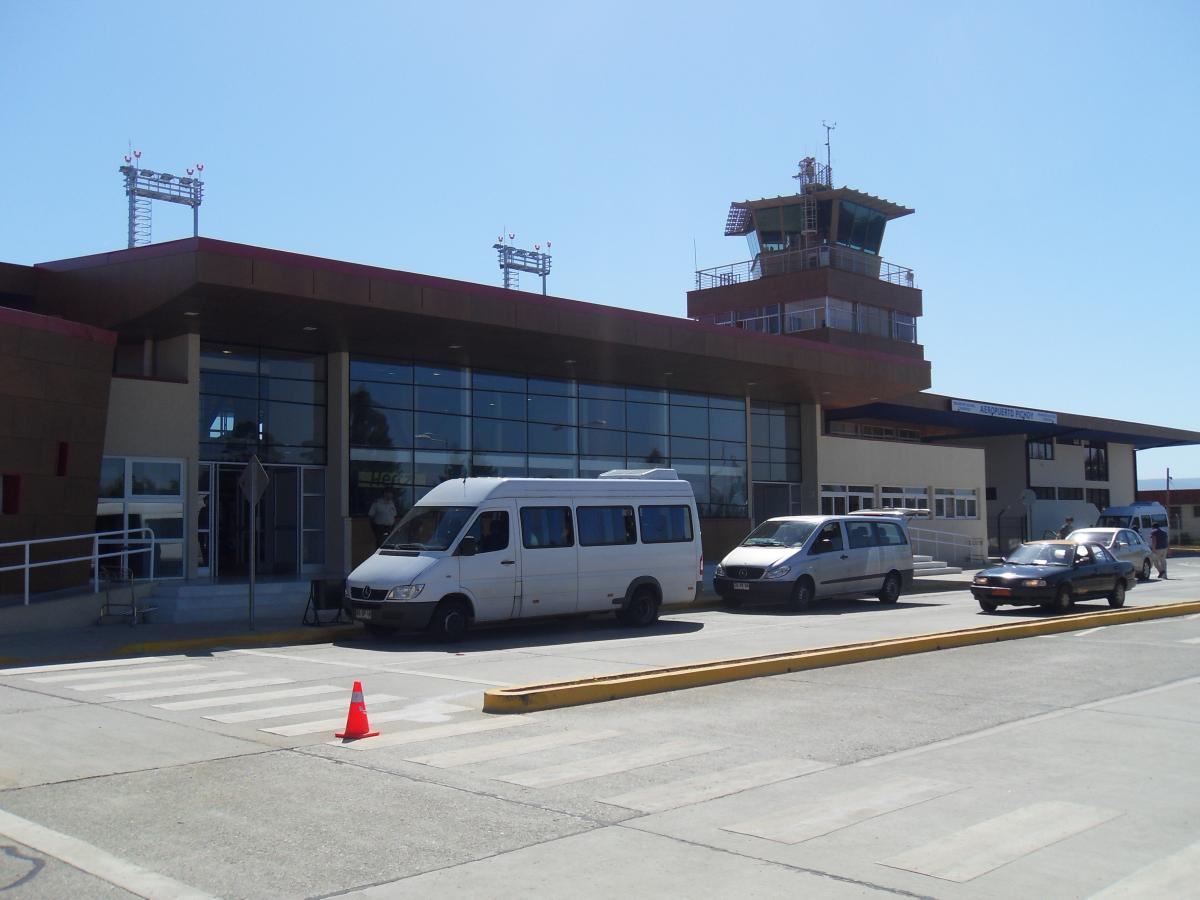
- IATA: ZAL; ICAO: SCVD

Summary
- Airport type: Public
- Serves: Valdivia, Chile
- Elevation AMSL: 59 ft (18 m)
- Coordinates: 39°38′59″S 73°05′10″W

Map
- Location of airport in Chile

Runways
| Direction | Length | | Surface |
| Direction | m | ft | Surface |
|---|---|---|---|
| 17/35 | 2,100 | 6,890 | Asphalt |
- Sources: WAD GCM

Pichoy Airport (Spanish: Aeródromo Pichoy) (IATA: ZAL, ICAO: SCVD) is an airport 32 kilometres (20 mi) northeast of Valdivia, a city in the Los Ríos Region of Chile. The airport lies next to Pichoy River.

== See also ==
- Transport in Chile
- List of airports in Chile
