= Mariquina, Chile =

San José de la Mariquina
- Commune
- Flag Coat of arms Location of Mariquina commune in Los Rios Region Location in Chile
- Coordinates (city): 39°31′S 72°58′W
- Country: Chile
- Region: Los Rios
- Province: Valdivia
- Founded as: San José de La Mariquina
- Founded: 10 December 1850

Government
  - Type: Municipality
  - Alcalde: Rolando Mitre

Area
  - Total: 1,320.5 km^{2} (509.8 sq mi)
- Elevation: 6 m (20 ft)

Population (2012 Census)
  - Total: 19,823
  - Density: 15.012/km^{2} (38.880/sq mi)
  - Urban: 8,925
  - Rural: 9,298

Sex
  - Men: 9,361
  - Women: 8,862
- Time zone: UTC−4 (CLT)
  - Summer (DST): UTC−3 (CLST)
- Area code: 56 + 63
- Website: Municipality of Mariquina

Mariquina is a commune in southern Chile, Valdivia Province, Los Ríos Region. It is located about 40 km northeast of Valdivia, close to Cruces River. The capital is the city of San José de la Mariquina. The commune's main economic activities are agriculture, cattle farming and wood pulp manufacturing.

== Demographics ==
Historical population
Year	Pop.	±% p.a.
1875	2,474	—
1885	3,683	+4.06%
1895	5,078	+3.26%
1907	7,487	+3.29%
1920	14,874	+5.42%
1930	15,556	+0.45%
1940	18,734	+1.88%
1952	22,105	+1.39%
1970	15,369	−2.00%
1982	16,960	+0.82%
1992	17,952	+0.57%
2002	18,223	+0.15%
2017	21,278	+1.04%
2024	24,006	+1.74%
Source: "Censo de Población y Vivienda". National Statistics Institute.

According to the 2002 census of the National Statistics Institute, Mariquina spans an area of 1,320.5 km^{2} (510 sq mi) and has 18,223 inhabitants (9,361 men and 8,862 women). Of these, 8,925 (49%) lived in urban areas and 9,298 (51%) in rural areas. The population grew by 1.5% (271 persons) between the 1992 and 2002 censuses.

== Administration ==
As a commune, Mariquina is a third-level administrative division of Chile administered by a municipal council, headed by an alcalde who is directly elected every four years. The current alcalde is Ronaldo Mitre Gatica.

Within the electoral divisions of Chile, Mariquina is represented in the Chamber of Deputies by Alfonso De Urresti (PS) and Roberto Delmastro (RN) as part of the 53rd electoral district, together with Valdivia, Lanco, Máfil and Corral. The commune is represented in the Senate during the 2014–2022 period by Alfonso de Urresti (PS) and Ena von Baer (UDI) as part of the 16th senatorial constituency (Los Ríos Region).

== History ==
In the mid-17th century local cacique Juan Manqueante ruled the lands of Mariquina. He presented himself to the Dutch who had arrived in Valdivia in 1643 as a friend. When the Spanish returned in 1645 he allied to them for about ten years until the Mapuche uprising of 1655. Local lore consider him the most notable person ever born in the lands of Mariquina. Manqueante was catholic according to contemporary chronicler Diego de Rosales.

According to Tomás Guevara, by the 18th century the Mapuche of Mariquina were among the last to raise chilihueques, a now extinct llama-like animal.

During the Mapuche uprising of 1881, most women of San José de la Mariquina were sent to the city of Valdivia as men prepared for hostilities. Chileans and German settlers dug defensive trenches around the town. At the moment of the uprising it was even thought that rebels could reach Valdivia in the south if they succeeded in penetrating San José de la Mariquina.
