= Angachilla River =

Coordinates: 39°53′14.97″S 73°11′4.00″W

Location
- Country: Chile

Physical characteristics
- Mouth
  - location: Confluence of Valdivia and Futa rivers
  - elevation: Near sea level

The Angachilla River is a river of Chile. The river and the wetland of the same name drains toward Valdivia River to which it connects near San Ramón Peninsula. The southern peripheral neighborhoods of Valdivia reaches the revier.

Since December 2021 the wetlands of Angachilla River are recognised as urban wetlands and are thus protected by the Urban Wetlands Law. The invasive plant species Limnobium laevigatum is present in the river.

== See also ==
- List of rivers of Chile
