= Guacamayo Island =

Island of Chile

- Interactive map of Guacamayo Island

Geography
- Coordinates: 39°52′31.18″S 73°16′26.51″W
- Adjacent to: Valdivia River

Administration
- Chile
- Region: Los Ríos
- Province: Valdivia
- Commune: Valdivia

Guacamayo Island (Spanish: Isla Guacamayo) is a river island south of Valdivia, south-central Chile. Next to it to the west lies the larger island of Isla del Rey.

The etymology of the island is not Mapudungun.

== Geography ==
The area of this island is 1.559 km² and the coastline being 6.5 km.
