= Neltume River =

Coordinates: 39°48′53″S 72°0′11″W

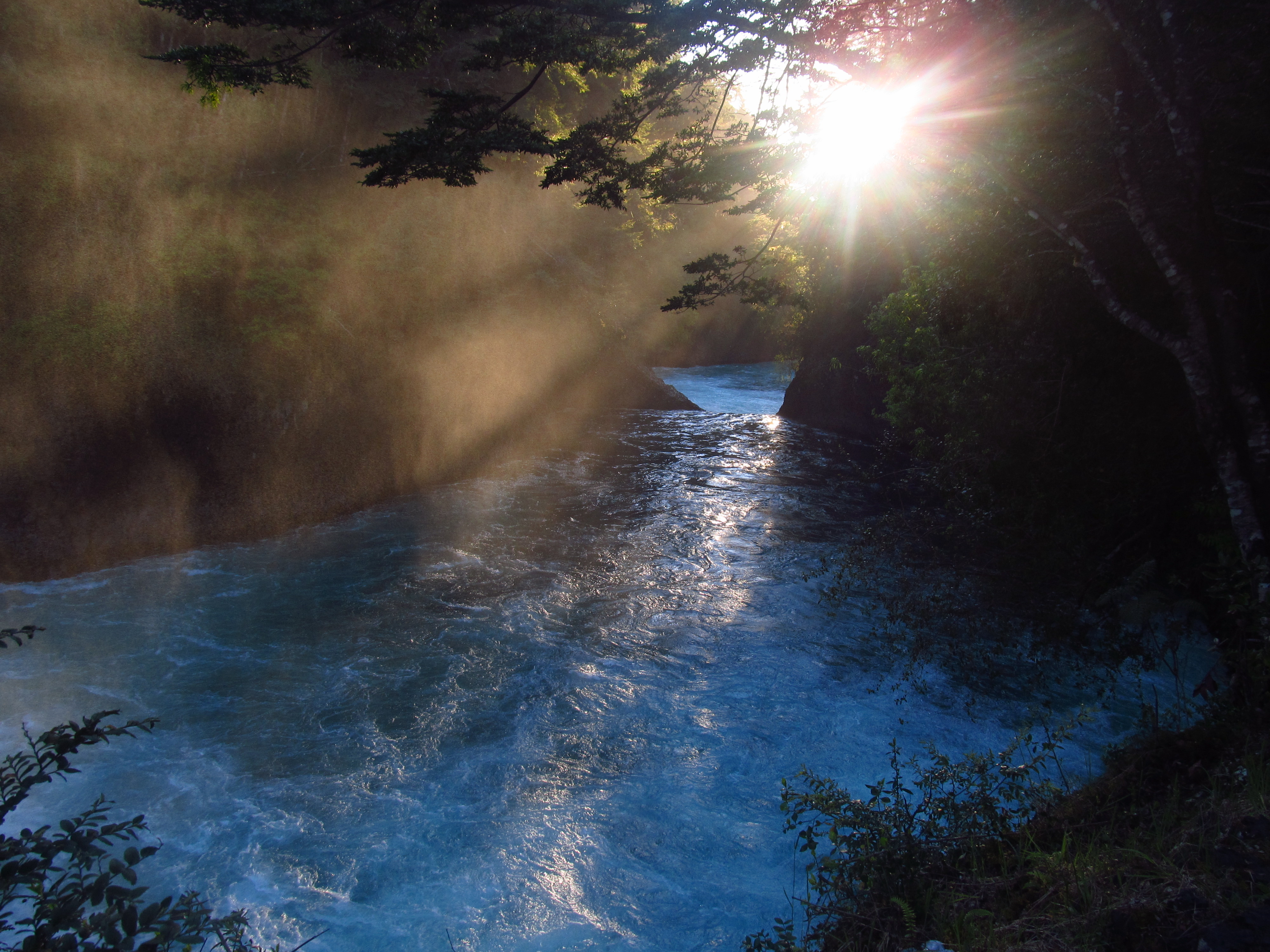
- Native name: Río Neltume (Spanish)

Location
- Country: Chile

Physical characteristics
- Source
  - location: Neltume Lake
- Mouth
  - location: Llanquihue River

Neltume River (Spanish: Río Neltume) is a river in the commune of Panguipulli, southern Chile. It drains Neltume Lake and flows southward where it joins Fuy River and creates together Llanquihue River.

== See also ==
- List of rivers of Chile
