= Tornagaleones River =

Coordinates: 39°56′38″S 73°19′16″W

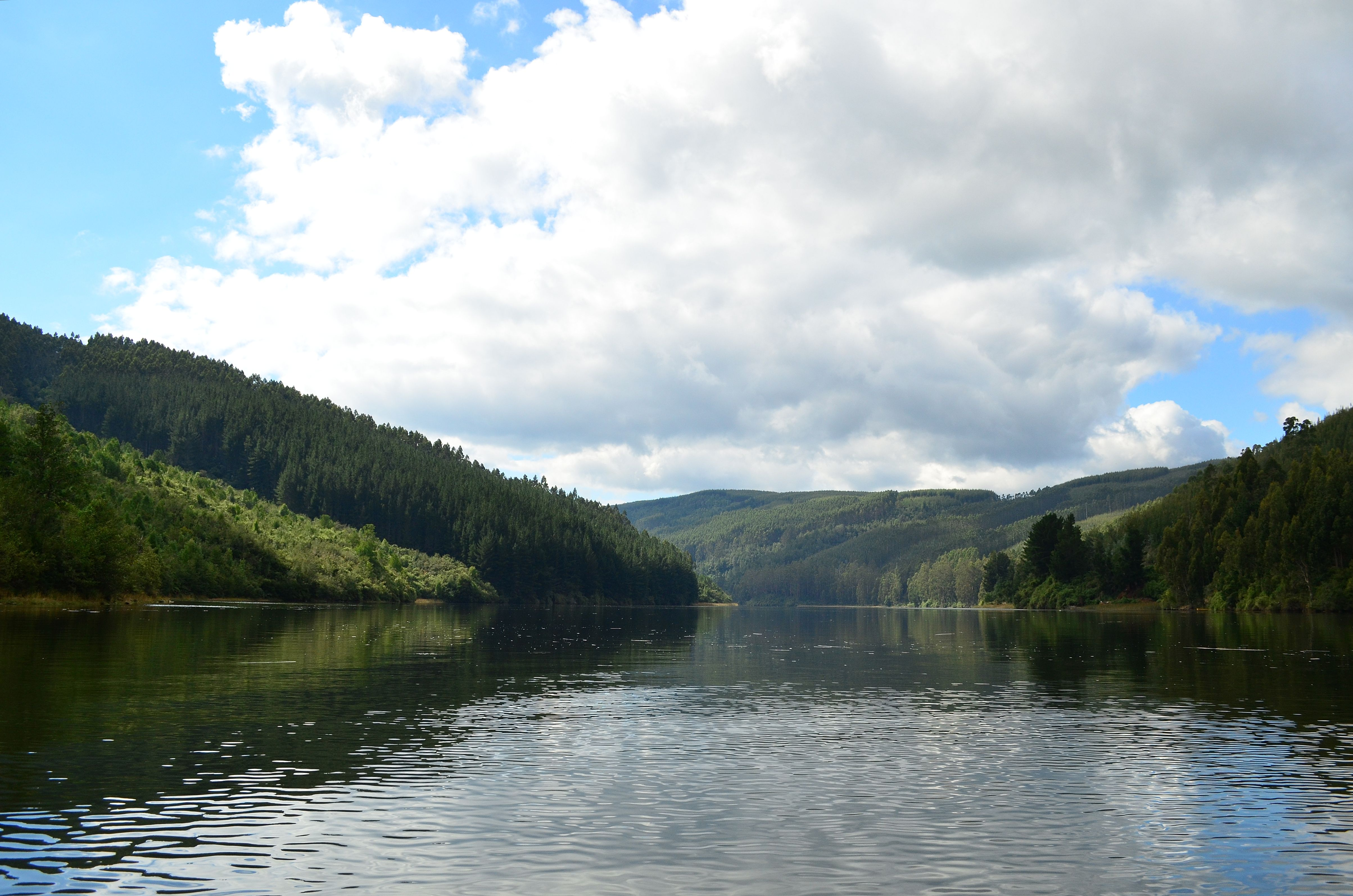
- Native name: Río Tornagaleones (Spanish)

Location
- Country: Chile

Physical characteristics
- Source
  - location: Futa River, Naguilan River
- Mouth
  - location: Tornagaleones River and Valdivia River
  - elevation: ~0 m (0 ft)

Tornagaleones River (Spanish: Río Tornagaleones) is a river and eastuarine channel in Los Ríos Region, Chile. Together with Valdivia and Futa River it encloses the fluvial island of Isla del Rey. The fresh waters of Tornagaleones comes from Futa, Naguilán and Valdivia River. During high tide brackish waters from Corral Bay enters the channel.

Tornagaleones means literally "turn around galleons". The name of the river derives from its utility in navigation as it allowed ships to turn around and position their bow towards the Pacific Ocean.

In August 1643, during the Dutch expedition to Valdivia one of Herckmans's ships ran aground a rocky shallow in Tornagaleones River forcing to Dutch to dismantle it.

== See also ==
- List of rivers of Chile
