= Llanquihue River =

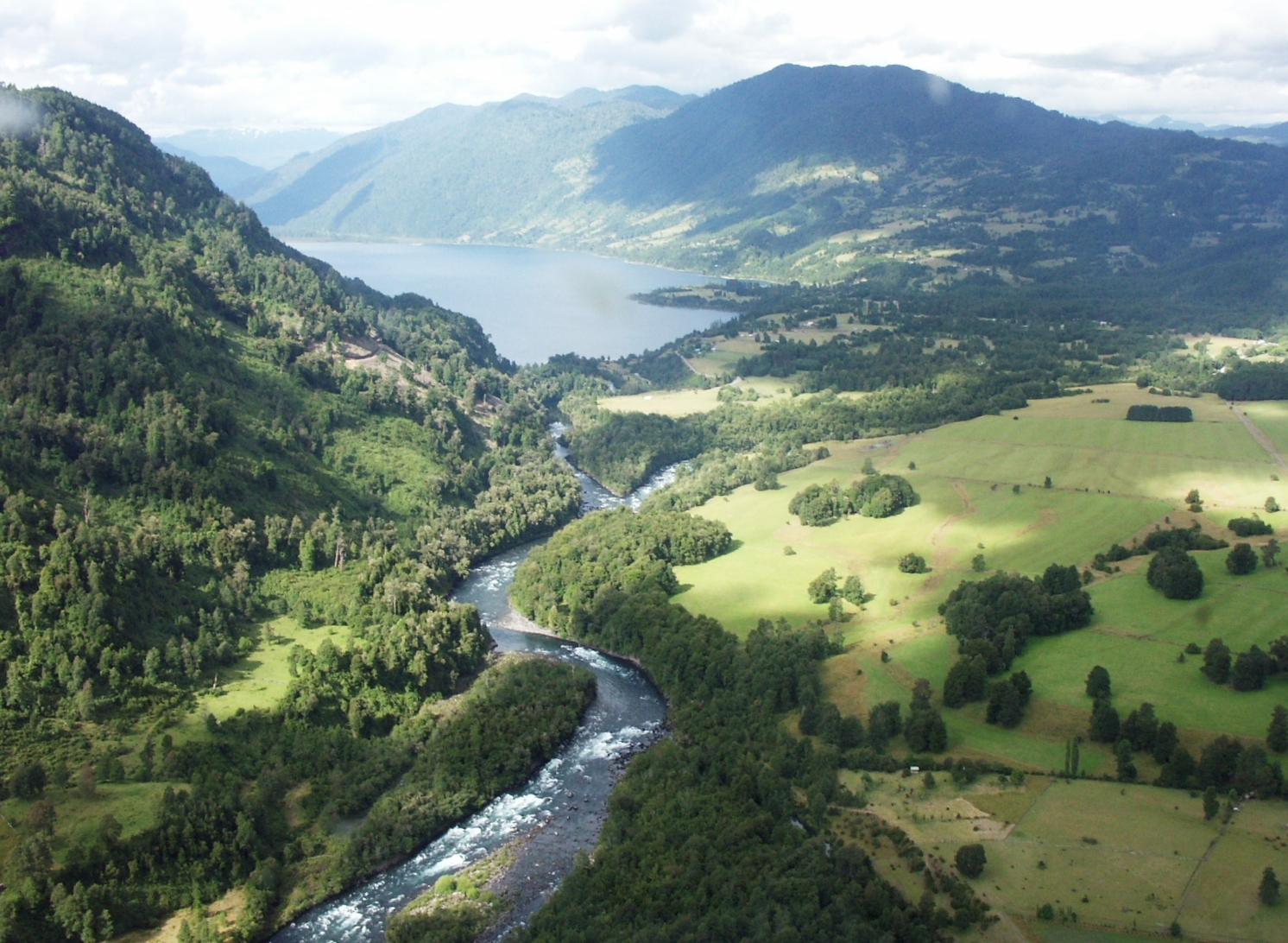
- The beginning of the Llanquihue River at the confluence of the Neltume and Fui Rivers

Location
- Country: Chile

Physical characteristics
- Source
  - location: Fui River, Neltume River
- Mouth
  - location: Panguipulli Lake
  - elevation: 130 m (430 ft)

Llanquihue River (Spanish: Río Llanquihue) is a river in the commune of Panguipulli, southern Chile. It is formed by the union of Neltume River and Fui River. Llanquihue River flows in a south and westward and outflows in Panguipulli Lake.
