= Cutipay River =

Coordinates: 39°49′52″S 73°20′27″W

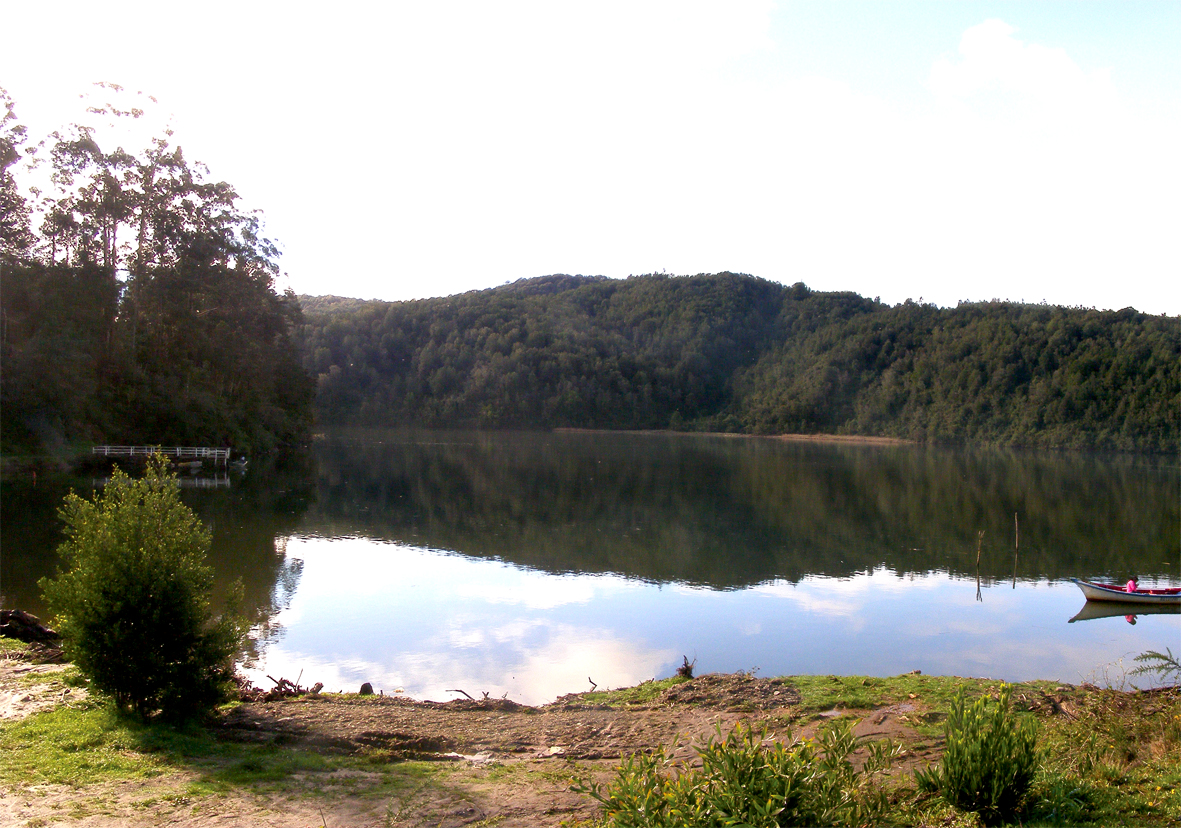
- Native name: Río Cutipay (Spanish)

Location
- Country: Chile

Physical characteristics
- Source
  - location: Cordillera de Oncol
- Mouth
  - location: Valdivia River
  - elevation: around 0–5 metres (0–16 ft) depending on tide

The Cutipay River is a river in Valdivia municipality, southern Chile. Cutipay is often referred to as an inlet of Valdivia River rather than a river. The water flow in Cutapay changes twice a day due to the tide in the Valdivia River. The northern part of the river hosts a small artisan shipyard. Wooden boats constructed in Cutipay can be found from the town of Queule to as far south as the Guaitecas Archipelago.

== See also ==
- List of rivers of Chile
