= Naguilán River =

- Native name: Río Naguilán (Spanish)

Location
- Country: Chile

Physical characteristics
- Source
  - location: Valdivian Coast Range
- Mouth
  - location: Tornagaleones River

Naguilán River is a river in Valdivia Province, southern Chile. It originates from the confluence of several minor streams in the Valdivian Coast Range and drains to Tornagaleones River, which in turn at the end outflows in Valdivia River.

== See also ==
- List of rivers of Chile
