= Pichoy River =

Coordinates: 39°41′58.35″S 73°5′43.12″W

Location
- Country: Chile

Physical characteristics
- Source
  - location: Iñaque River
- Mouth
  - location: Cruces River
  - elevation: Near sea level

The Pichoy River is a river of Chile. The invasive plant species Limnobium laevigatum is present in the river.

== See also ==
- List of rivers of Chile
