= Liquiñe River =

Coordinates: 39°43′17″S 71°51′47″W

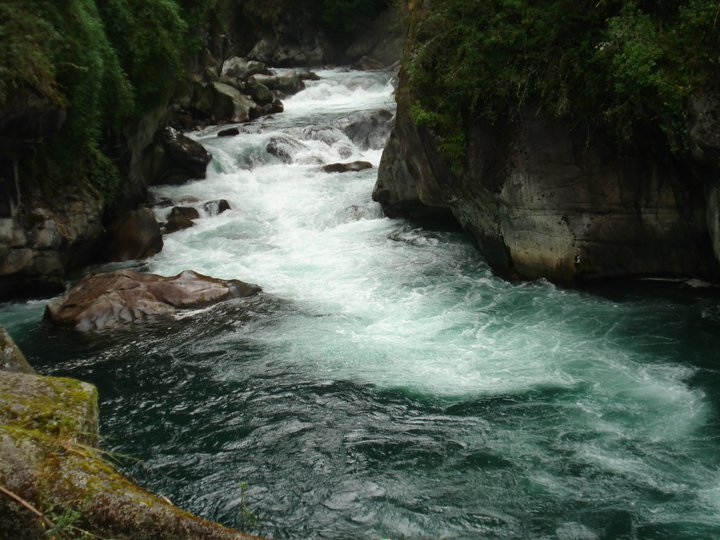

Location
- Country: Chile

Physical characteristics
- Source
  - location: Andes near Carirriñe Pass
- Mouth
  - location: Cua-Cua River

The Liquiñe River is a river in the Andes of Los Ríos Region, Chile. The river is most known for the many hotsprings the upwell at its middle reaches where the town of Liquiñe is currently placed.

== See also ==
- List of rivers of Chile
