= Chapelco River =

Location
- Country: Chile

The Chapelco River is a river of Chile.

== See also ==
- List of rivers of Chile
