= Fuy River =

Coordinates: 39.8258°S 72.0903°W

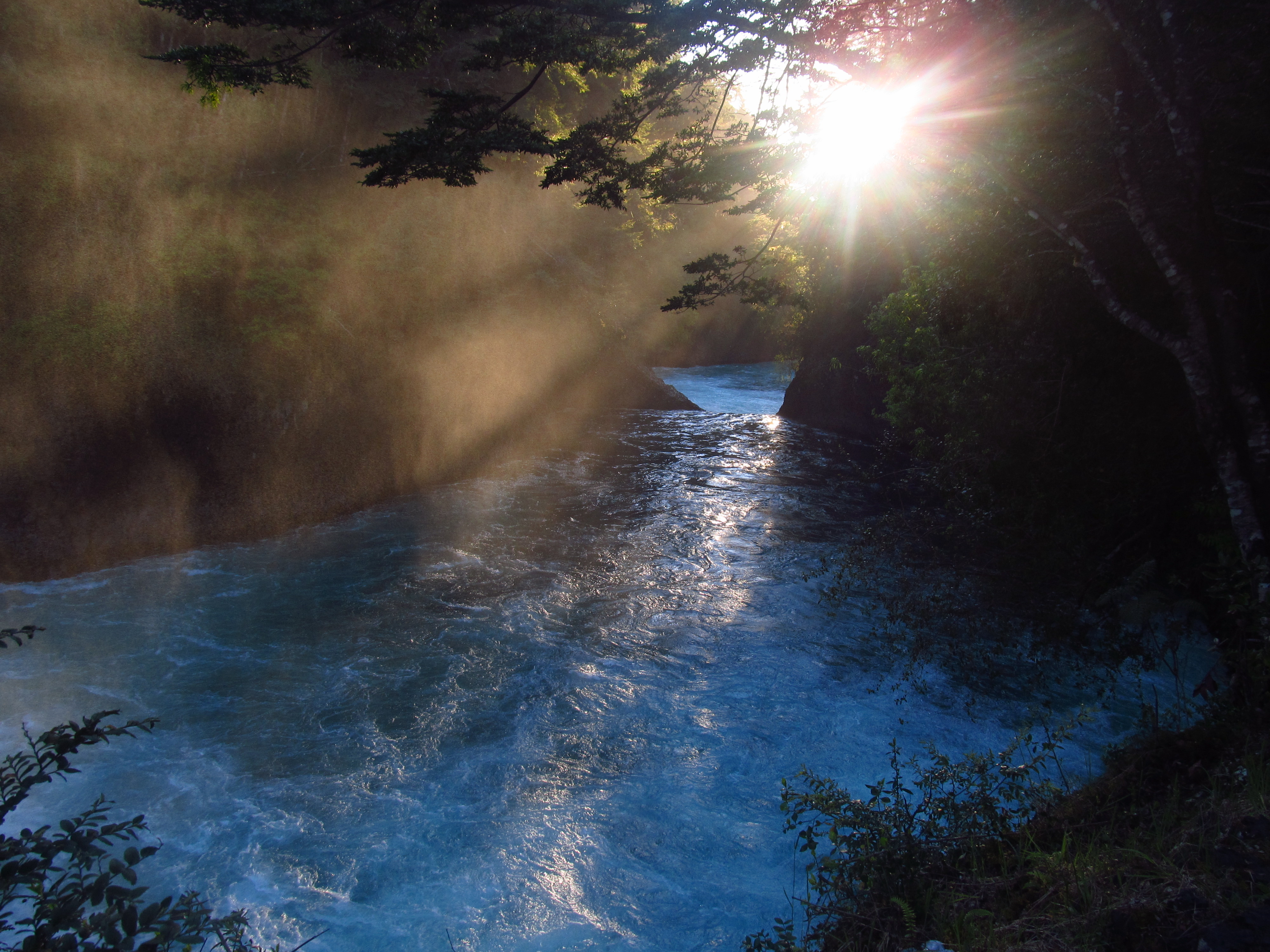
- Aerial view of Fuy River and the town of Neltume
- Native name: Río Fuy (Spanish)

Location
- Country: Chile

Physical characteristics
- Source
  - location: Pirihueico Lake
- Mouth
  - location: Panguipulli Lake

Fuy River (Spanish: Río Fuy) is a river in the commune of Panguipulli, southern Chile. It drains Pirihueico Lake and flows southward along the village of Neltume where it joins the Neltume River and together they create the Panguipulli Lake. The river's origin is near the village of Puerto Fuy (es).

In Huilo-Huilo Biological Reserve there are two waterfalls, the Salto la Leona and the Salto Huilo-Huilo, two important touristic attractions, they can be reached by trekking inside the reserve.
