= Madre de Dios Mine =

Gold mine in Chile

Coordinates: 39°36′34″S 72°46′15″W

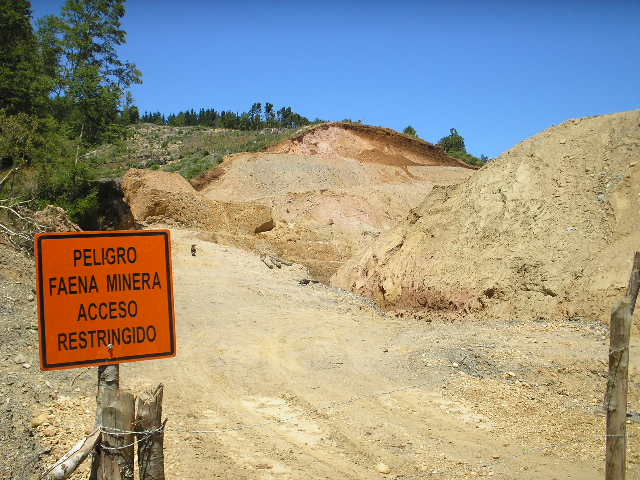
View of one of the Mines in the Madre de Dios area

Madre de Dios, located east the town of Máfil in Chile, is a placer deposit of gold that has been mined several times since its discovery in 1556. The bedrock of the Madre de Dios area is made of metamorphic and crystalline rocks of Paleozoic age all part of the Bahía Mansa Metamorphic Complex. These rocks are covered with thick layers of glacial gravel from the Late Cenozoic. Gold eroded from the gravel have deposited in nearby streams, thus giving origin to the placer deposit. The deposit was discovered by Spaniards in 1556 but was not mined extensively until the late 19th century.

From 1898 to 1936 a total of 2.6 tonnes of gold were produced. The deposits are currently being prospected by the Global Gold corporation.

== Sources ==
- Report on the Madre de Dios Placer Gold Project, Chile
- Crónica del Reino de Chile
