= Futa River =

Coordinates: 39°56′14″S 73°13′18″W

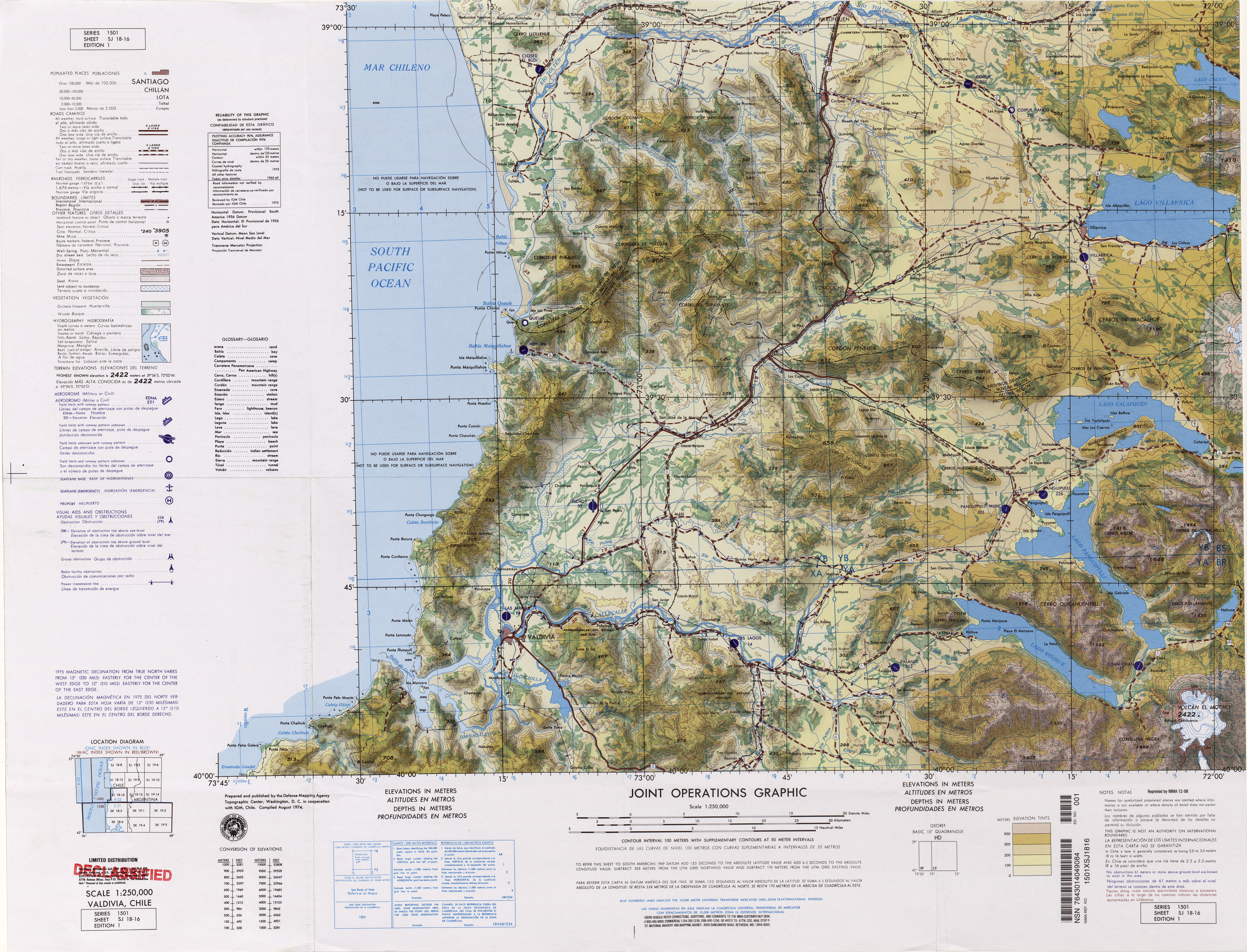
- Native name: Río Futa (Spanish)

Location
- Country: Chile

Physical characteristics
- Source
  - location: Valdivian Coast Range
- Mouth
  - location: Tornagaleones River and Valdivia River
  - elevation: ~0 m (0 ft)

The Futa River is a river in Los Ríos Region, Chile. It drains waters from the cordillera at the Valdivian Coast Range border north to Tornagaleones River, which in turn flows into the Pacific Ocean at Corral Bay.

== See also ==
- List of rivers of Chile
