= SQM case =

Criminal case in Chile

Sociedad Química y Minera de Chile (SQM) is a Chilean chemical and mining company that mines lithium and makes fertilizer and other chemicals. The company is currently under indictment and investigation for diverting funds to different politicians in Chile. The SQM Case is closely related to the Penta Case, since defendants from both cases overlap and it is the same type of crime. So it is also called the Penta-SQM Case. So far, 6 defendants have been charged.

This case involves allegations of tax fraud and violations of political campaign laws. Various individuals, including politicians, their advisers, and family members, allegedly created fake invoices, which SQM then paid. It is claimed that the proceeds from these invoices were passed on to political parties in violation of campaign finance laws. These individuals are alleged to have acted on behalf of politicians, without the politicians being directly involved. Whether the funds secured any favors for SQM from politicians has so far only been demonstrated in the case of former mining minister Pablo Wagner. New charges brought in August 2015 against certain defendants also include allegations of steering contracts.

In 2017, the United States government announced a deferred prosecution agreement with SQM, in which SQM would pay $15m USD, to settle Foreign Corrupt Practices Act charges. Following the 2017 U.S. Foreign Corrupt Practices Act settlement, SQM implemented new compliance, auditing, and internal-control measures monitored by an independent consultant. The U.S. Department of Justice confirmed in 2020 that SQM had fulfilled the terms of its deferred prosecution agreement and completed the three-year compliance period.

The principal stock holder of SQM is Julio Ponce Lerou, formerly son-in-law of the late dictator Augusto Pinochet. He was not charged with any wrongdoing.

Charges brought against employees and owners of SQM

| Name | Position | Status |
|---|---|---|
| Eugenio Ponce | VP SQM | Accused of signing fake invoices |
| Patricio Contesse González | Former general manager SQM | Charged with tax crimes |
| Carlos Alberto Délano | Owner | House arrest at night |
| Carlos Eugenio Lavín | Owner | House arrest at night |
| Roberto Guzmán | Advisor to Julio Ponce | Charged |

This case is different from the Penta Case in that false invoices the tax authorities (SII) were then used to funnel money to politicians on both sides of the political spectrum. In the Penta Case, funds were diverted to right wing politicians of the National Renewal (RN) and Independent Democratic Union (UDI) parties. In the SQM case, the members of the governing coalition, the Nueva Mayoria, received funds as well.

This case is still under investigation. The politicians under investigation are listed below. In many cases payments were made to their assistants and not directly to the politicians.

Governing Coalition (Nueva Mayoria)

| Name | Party | Status |
|---|---|---|
| Alejandro Bahamondes | Former VP of PPD party and partner of Kybalion Consultores Limitida who issued $22 million CPL in invoices to SQM | Resigned as Chilean ambassador to Paraguay |
| David Flores | Campaign advisor to Carolina Tohá (OOD), Mayor of Santiago | Charged |

Others

| Name | Role | Status |
|---|---|---|
| Alberto Ayala | Prosecutor | Under investigation for leaking details of SQM case to Rodrigo Peñailillo |
| Rodrigo Peñailillo | Minister of Interior in Bachelet government | Resigned as Minister of the Interior in Bachelet government because of connections to SQM case in which he had to defend payments made by the firm to him before he entered the government |
| Giorgio Martelli | Partner, Asesorías y Negocios SpA, fundraiser for President Bachelet's first campaign for president | charged with tax crimes and evasion of taxes between 2009 and 2013 which overlaps at his time as political operative in the Bachelet campaign |
| Carolina de la Cerda | Sister-in-law of former mining sub secretary Pablo Wagner | Under investigation |

Alliance (Conservative)

| Name | Party | Status |
|---|---|---|
| Jovino Novoa | Founding member and former UDI Senator | Charges with presenting false tax declaration and false invoices to the tax authorities (SII) in the amount of 80 million CLP. Under house arrest |
| Claudio Eguiluz | Ex-Vice president of RN | Is charged in criminal court by prosecutors of the Public Ministry with tax fraud for 465,000 Chilean Pesos. Charges were dismissed when tax authorities (SII) did not present their own charges. The prosecution needs for the separate tax agency to file charges as well. |
| José Tomás Longueira Brinkmann | Son of former senator and presidential candidate Pablo Longueira (UDI) | José Longueira issued invoices to SQM in 2010 for $4.450.333 CLP |
| Pablo Wagner | Mining sub secretary under President Piñera | House arrest at night |
| Jaime Orpis Bouchon | Senator (UDI) | Also implicated in Corpesca corruption case |
| Santiago Valdés | Former manager of Bancard and official in presidential campaign of President Piñera | Charged with tax crimes |
| Alejandro Sule | Former congressman (PR) | Charged with tax crimes |
