= Pablo Wagner =

Chilean politician

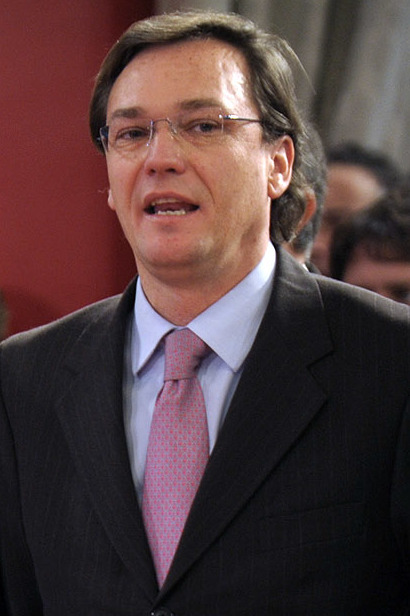

Undersecretary of Mining
- In office 20 June 2020 – 11 March 2022
- President: Sebastián Piñera
- Preceded by: Verónica Baraona del Pedregal
- Succeeded by: Francisco Orrego Bauzá

Personal details
- Born: 29 June 1970 (age 56) Santiago, Chile
- Party: Independent Democratic Union
- Education: Pontifical Catholic University of Chile (Lic.) (MA); University of Texas at Austin (PhD)
- Occupation: Politician
- Profession: Engineer

Pablo Guillermo Wagner San Martín (June 29, 1970) is a Chilean commercial engineer, businessman, and politician. After a long period in the private sector, he was Undersecretary of Mining in the first government of President Sebastián Piñera between 2010 and 2012. In 2017 he was indicted for repeated bribery and money laundering offenses in the Penta case, being finally convicted in July 2018 as perpetrator of repeated tax offenses and relevant and unjustified capital increase.

== Professional career ==
He began his working life as head of corporate marketing at Cristalerías de Chile, after which he moved to Empresas Penta as project manager between 1998 and 2000, and then as manager of planning and development of Banmédica, between 2000 and 2009. He developed a close relationship with businessman Carlos Alberto Délano, one of the group's main shareholders.

He was on the board of AFP Cuprum between 2001 and 2010, and was appointed vice chairman of the board in 2007, while the company was then chaired by Ernesto Silva Bafalluy. He was also a director of Isapre Cruz Blanca, a position he resigned from in 2014.

== Political career ==
In the late 1980s, he joined the conservative Independent Democratic Union (UDI). He was known for following Jaime Guzmán's political ideas and Miguel Kast's economic views. Some of his close friends during his early years in the party were Rodrigo Álvarez and Darío Paya. At the beginning of the 1990s, he was part of two youth directives in the party. Later, he became a member of the party's Political Commission.

In 2010, after Sebastián Piñera's victory in the 2009–2010 presidential election, he was appointed as the Undersecretary of Mining, with Laurence Golborne serving as the Minister. His administration is best remembered for the rescue of the 33 miners who were trapped in the San José Mine. However, his stint ended abruptly in October 2012 when the tender for the exploitation of lithium deposits was annulled. This was due to the non-compliance of the winning company, Sociedad Química y Minera de Chile (SQM), with the terms and conditions.
