= Corpesca case =

The Corpesca case refers to an investigation and criminal case in Chile that revolves around illicit payments made by the industrial fishing firm Corpesca to at least two politicians, namely Jaime Orpis of the UDI party and Felipe Harboe of the PPD party. The objective of these payments was to influence votes pertaining to the fishing law known as the Longueira Law. The law, enacted in 2012, resulted in the allocation of a significant portion of Chile's fishing quota to companies controlled by no more than seven families, with the provision that these fishing rights would be inherited indefinitely by their heirs. The case primarily focuses on the influence exerted during the distribution of fishing quotas under the Longueira law.

In Chile, a small number of industrial fishing companies possess the largest quotas for fishing specific species such as Merluccius australis, Chilean jack mackerel, and anchovies. The Corpesca case specifically investigates the payments made to manipulate the decision-making process when allocating quotas under the Longueira Law.

Corpesca is predominantly owned (77%) by Grupo Angelini, and it has been implicated in the scandal due to allegations of bribery. The company is accused of making illicit payments, facilitated through the submission of counterfeit invoices to tax authorities. In Chile, companies have the capability to generate their invoices directly through the website of the tax service. The presentation of these fraudulent invoices was carried out by individuals associated with Corpesca, including Carolina Zúñiga and members of her family, former policemen Alexis and Marcelo Ramírez Quiroz, Bárbara Molina Ellis, and Raúl Arrieta.

The fishing law allocated quotas to nine different industrial fishers while leaving smaller fishermen with only a small percentage of the total permitted harvest. The small-scale fishermen have criticized this legislation and demanded modifications due to the alleged bribery intended to influence its outcome. These fishermen frequently stage protests against regulations, such as the requirement for their boats to be equipped with GPS trackers to monitor compliance with the permitted fishing areas.

The investigation into the Corpesca case is being conducted by the same team of prosecutors who are handling the SQM and Penta cases, other high-profile corruption cases in Chile. Sabas Chahuán serves as the lead prosecutor in this investigation.

One of the politicians implicated in the case is Jaime Orpis from the UDI party. He is accused of accepting bribes amounting to 230 million CLP (Chilean pesos) from Corpesca. Orpis faces a criminal complaint alleging bribery, as he is believed to have received the funds in exchange for a favorable vote on the new fishing law, which granted fishing quotas.

Deputy Hugo Gutiérrez from the PC party has also filed charges of bribery against Senator Antonio Horvath, an independent politician. Additionally, Gutiérrez has brought charges against all members of the Fishing Committee in the Senate who were responsible for overseeing the passage of the Longueira fishing law. These individuals include Fulvio Rossi, Carlos Bianchi, Alejandro García-Huidobro, and Hosaín Sabag.
