= Huilo-Huilo (disambiguation) =

Huilo-Huilo sometimes stylized: Huilo Hulio may refer to:

- Huilo-Huilo Biological Reserve
- Huilo-Huilo Falls
- A Mapudungun word
