= Tomás Monfil =

Tomás Monfil (died 2009) was a Chilean forester, and one of the principal persons behind the reforestation program of CONAF in Aysén del General Carlos Ibáñez del Campo Region in the 1960s. Monfil contributed to the reforestation of about 8,000 ha (20,000 acres) in Aysen where 2,800,000 ha (6,900,000 acres) forest had previously been burned during the colonization in the early 20th century. Later he served as regional director of CONAF in Aysén del General Carlos Ibáñez del Campo Region in the 1970s before being appointed chief executive of CONAF's Complejo Forestal y Maderero Panguipulli that managed more than 300,000 ha (740,000 acres) in the zones of Panguipulli and Neltume and had more than two thousand employees.

== Sources ==
- Homenaje al silvicultor Tómas Monfil
- Homenaje Al Silvicultor Don Tómas Monfil
