= Jovino Novoa =

Chilean politician (1945–2021)

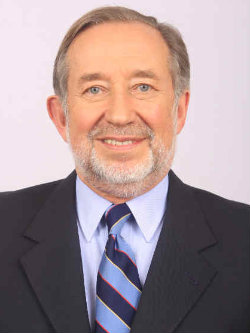

President of the Senate of Chile
- In office 11 March 2009 – 11 March 2010
- Preceded by: Andrés Zaldívar
- Succeeded by: Jorge Pizarro

Member of the Senate
- In office 11 March 1998 – 11 March 2014
- Preceded by: Miguel Otero Lathrop
- Succeeded by: Andrés Allamand
- Constituency: 7th Circunscription, (Santiago Poniente)

General Undersecretary of the Republic of Chile
- In office 1 June 1979 – 1 June 1982
- Preceded by: Mario Ríos Santander
- Succeeded by: Mario Messen García

Personal details
- Born: 31 March 1945 Santiago, Chile
- Died: 1 June 2021 (aged 76) Frutillar, Chile
- Party: Unión Demócrata Independiente (1988–2021)
- Education: Pontifical Catholic University of Chile
- Occupation: Politician
- Profession: Lawyer

Enrique Manuel Jovino Novoa Vásquez (31 March 1945 – 1 June 2021) was a Chilean politician. He was a member of the Senate of Chile (1998–2014) and was the president of the Senate of Chile (2009–2010).

He served as General Undersecretary of Augusto Pinochet's dictatorship from 1979 to 1982.

Unlike many others in his party, the Independent Democratic Union, Novoa was not religious and considered himself agnostic, and at times he voiced support several pro-choice positions. Likewise, within the UDI he achieved to establish the dominance of his liberal-conservative faction, which coexisted with Pablo Longueira's social-conservative current.

This last one had as its characteristic the political work in poor sectors, whereas Novoa's faction was concentrated in the relation with businessmen, the empowerment of think tanks like Libertad y Desarrollo (LyD) or the training of then young or students' leaders from Pontifical Catholic University of Chile (PUC) like Jaime Bellolio or Javier Macaya.

In 2015, he was sentenced for tax crimes related to the Penta and SQM cases. Six years later, Novoa died on 1 June 2021, aged 76, from emphysema.

== Early life and education ==
Novoa was born in Santiago on 31 March 1945. He was the son of Jovino Novoa Rojas and Silvia Vásquez Vargas. He was married to María Angélica Mackenna Echaurren and was the father of eight children.

Between 1951 and 1962, he completed his primary and secondary education at Saint George's College. He later entered the Pontifical Catholic University of Chile, where he obtained his law degree in 1970. His undergraduate thesis, titled Theory of the University, was co-authored with Jaime Guzmán.

== Professional career ==
In the late 1960s, Novoa became associated with the Centro de Estudios Socioeconómicos (CESEC). Between 1971 and 1977, he lived in Argentina, where he engaged in commercial activities and practiced law at the firm Cruzat, Ortúzar, Mackenna y Novoa. After returning to Chile, he resumed his legal practice, focusing primarily on commercial and civil law until 1979.

In 1982, he became editor of news services at the newspaper El Mercurio of Santiago, a position he held until 1985. Concurrently, he served as a professor at the Law School of the Pontifical Catholic University of Chile and joined the Chilean Bar Association.

In 1985, he joined the law firm Guerrero, Olivos, Novoa, Errázuriz, which he left after being elected senator in 1997. From March 2014, he served as chairman of the board of the Jaime Guzmán Foundation.

== Political career ==
Novoa became politically active during his university years. From 1963 onward, he was part of the group that would later found the gremialist movement. In March 1967, under the leadership of Jaime Guzmán, he participated in its formal founding alongside Hernán Larraín, Sergio Gutiérrez, Ernesto Illanes, Felipe Lamarca, Máximo Silva, Manuel Bezanilla, Luis Monge, Rodrigo Mujica, Roberto García, Raúl Lecaros, and a group of academics from the Law School of the Pontifical Catholic University of Chile. The movement emerged as an opposition force to the governments of Eduardo Frei Montalva and Salvador Allende.

In 1969, Novoa took part in the senatorial campaign of Francisco Bulnes Sanfuentes and later joined the presidential campaign of former president Jorge Alessandri, directing the youth organization Chile Joven.

From 1979 to May 1982, he served as Secretary General of Government during the military regime of Augusto Pinochet. During his tenure, major national events took place, including preparations for the 1980 constitutional plebiscite, the assassination of trade union leader Tucapel Jiménez, and the death of former president Eduardo Frei Montalva.

During the same period, Novoa became increasingly involved in party politics, helping to lay the foundations of what would become the Independent Democratic Union and National Renewal. He actively participated in the Yes campaign during the 1988 plebiscite. Following the split of National Renewal that year, he served as vice president of the UDI until 1991 and as party president from 1992 to 1998.

In 1993, he was proclaimed the UDI's presidential candidate but withdrew in favor of Arturo Alessandri Besa. He later served again as president of the UDI between 2004 and 2006. In May 2008, he was elected president of the Union of Latin American Parties (UPLA), an international center-right organization.

In 2015, Novoa was convicted of tax offenses in connection with the Penta case and the SQM case.

Novoa died on 1 June 2021 in Frutillar, Chile.
