= Félix de Vicente =

Chilean minister

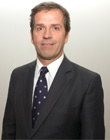

Ministry of Economy, Development and Tourism
- In office 7 May 2013 – 11 March 2014
- President: Sebastián Pinera
- Preceded by: Pablo Longueira
- Succeeded by: Luis Felipe Céspedes

Personal details
- Born: 20 November 1962 (age 63) Santiago, Chile
- Party: Independent Democratic Union (UDI)
- Spouse: María Elisa Eguiguren
- Children: Five
- Parent(s): Luis de Vicente; Rosario Mingo
- Education: University of Chile; Pontifical Catholic University of Chile
- Occupation: Politician
- Profession: Economist

José Félix de Vicente Mingo (born 20 November 1962 in Santiago) is a Chilean economist and businessman, former Minister of Economy, Development and Tourism during President Sebastián Piñera's first government.

He studied at Saint George's College. He graduated there in 1981 as the best student in his generation. Then, he graduated as a commercial engineer with a mention in Economics from Universidad de Chile.

== Family and education ==
He was born to Luis de Vicente Cabello and Rosario Mingo Echavarri. He entered into a civil marriage on 30 September 1988 in Las Condes with María Elisa Eguiguren Balmaceda (daughter of Raúl Francisco Antonio Eguiguren Ortúzar and Eliana Bernardita Balmaceda Jaramillo), with whom he has five children.

He completed his primary education at Saint George's College in Santiago, graduating in 1981 as the top student of his class ("best Georgian"). He later enrolled in business administration with a major in economics at the University of Chile. At that institution he served as president of his school’s student association in 1986–87. He also undertook studies in civil engineering at the Pontificia Universidad Católica de Chile.

== Professional career ==
After graduating, he joined the retail company Telemercados Europa as Administration and Finance Manager, a company that had been acquired by Alfredo Moreno, for whom he had served as a teaching assistant at university. At the same time, he carried out various agricultural businesses with his father and older brother, which allowed him to accumulate capital.

In 1991, together with his father-in-law, Antonio Eguiguren, he acquired the door manufacturing company Beagle Doors. Three years later, the American company Jeld-Wen purchased a 25% stake in the firm. In the early 2000s, the Chilean partners sold their entire participation for a figure that, according to analysts, exceeded US$12 million.

Afterwards, together with businessman Ignacio Cueto, he became involved in the kitchen equipment supplier The Kitchen Center. Simultaneously, he was a partner—along with his father-in-law and Rafael Valdivieso—of the Yarur family in the cemetery chain Parque del Sendero.

Other companies in which he participated included De Vicente Plásticos, founded by his father in 1967, and Tecno Tip Top, a services and products firm for the mining industry.

He entered the Chilean state apparatus in March 2010 as Director of ProChile, after being recruited by Moreno, now his superior as Minister of Foreign Affairs. In May 2013 he assumed the post of Minister of Economy, Development and Tourism, replacing the resigned Pablo Longueira, who had decided to launch a (ultimately unsuccessful) presidential bid.

In December 2013, he formalized his membership in the Independent Democratic Union.
