= COVENSA =

Chilean firm

COVENSA is an acronym for "Corporación de Ventas de Salitre y Yodo de Chile" (in English, Chile Saltpeter and Iodine Sales Corporation) was the estanco formed between the Chilean State and the private producing companies that operated between 1934 and 1968. It was in charge of regulating the export and commercialization of nitrate and iodine. It arose as a replacement for COSACH (Compañía de Salitres de Chile, 1930 - 1933).

== Creation and legal modifications ==
The creation of COVENSA, by Law No.5, 350 of 8 January 1934, signified important changes in the nitrate industry. In the first place, unlike COSACH, it did not participate in extraction or conversion itself, but only the export, commercialization and collection of profits. It did not participate in the ownership of any companies. It would have a duration of 35 years from 1 July 1933. COVENSA's profits would be the difference in prices paid to producers and the sale price. Of these, 25% would remain for the treasury as income tax, being the only taxation of companies.

COVENSA could also impose and fix a minimum wage, according to the conditions of each nitrate zone, for the workers. The Law also established that companies had to source national inputs on equal terms with foreigners, contract insurance with national companies and deliver part of their production to the tax agencies that requested it, through COVENSA, at a price set by the COVENSA board of directors.

During the second presidency of Carlos Ibáñez the nitrate industry was again in crisis. Law No. 12.018 on the Nitrate Referendum was promulgated in 1956. This granted tax exemptions, release of customs duties, return in dollars at the best exchange rate and the change of the fixed amortization to one percentage, with the commitment to invest in production improvements, The state's share rises from 25% to 40% and the total commercialization of the production was allowed, eliminating the stock. However, these measures were not enough to improve production and profits, breaking CONSAT in 1960.

== Evolution of COVENSA members ==
Initially three production units were established

- Compañía Salitrera Anglo-Chilena;
- Lautaro Nitrate Company;
- Compañía Salitrera de Tarapacá y Antofagasta (CSTA or COSATAN), resulting from the merge of 34 other producers

In 1951 Anglo Chilean Nitrate acquired Lautaro Nitrate creating the Compañía Salitrera Anglo Lautaro. In 1960 when COSATAN went bankrupt, CORFO created the Empresa Salitrera Victoria (ESAVI) as a subsidiary from COSATAN's assets.

== Dissolution ==
In 1968 the government of President Eduardo Frei Montalva decided not to extend the duration of COVENSA, which was thus wound up on July 1. Negotiations between CORFO and Compañía Salitrera Anglo Lautaro led to the creation of the Sociedad Química y Minera de Chile that incorporates the assets of both.

== Bibliography ==
- Departamento de Estudios Financieros del Ministerio de Hacienda. 1958. Manual de Organización del Gobierno de Chile. Santiago de Chile. Talleres Gráficos La Nación S.A.
- Soto Cárdenas, Alejandro. 1998. Influencia británica en el salitre: origen, naturaleza y decadencia. Editorial Universidad de Santiago de Chile. Santiago. ISBN 956-7069-32-8 PDF version available at the Memoria Chilena
