= Cedomil Lausic Glasinovic =

Chilean agronomist and revolutionary

Cedomil Lausic Glasinovic (July 16, 1946 - April 3, 1975) was a Chilean agronomist and prominent member of the Marxist–Leninist MIR organisation in Chile.

Glasinovic was born in the southern city of Punta Arenas in the Magallanes region of Chile in 1946. As many young Chilean students of his time he became politically active in one of the main youth and left-wing organisation in Chile in the late 1960s and early 1970s - the MIR political organisation. Lausic Glasinovic graduated in agronomy from the University of Chile in 1970 and shortly after started to work in government funded agricultural projects.

Glasinovic remained in Chile after the September 11, 1973 Chilean coup even though many of his comrades had been assassinated or had been subject to forced disappearances. The MIR organisation had also been proscribed and it became the object of extreme repression by the military and Pinochet's secret police, DINA.

On April 3, 1975 Glasinovic was arrested and taken to Villa Grimaldi by DINA agents of the Pinochet regime. Here he was tortured with electricity, and beaten with rifle butts. Those who saw Glasinovic whilst he was in Villa Grimaldi bear testimony to the incident that caused his death. Glasinovic is said to have had an episode of madness before one of the torture sessions he was subjected to and made an aborted attempt to escape from the prison before the eyes of the guards. In the process of running he attempted to assaulted a DINA agent. The disruption this caused in the prison led DINA to use the opportunity to make an example of him before his comrades and all the other political prisoners in Villa Grimaldi. Glasinovic, who was very tall, young and fit, is said to have been brought into a room where his comrades were forced to congregate and watch as he was beaten with metal chains by a group of DINA agents until his body was bleeding, broken and he became unconscious. He was left with his comrades in a critical and agonizing state with his bruised, bleeding and broken body. Glasinovicwas not given any medical attention and he died alone in solitary confinement several days later.

The torture centre in which he was killed was transformed into a memorial for the victims of the Pinochet regime. Glasinovic's name is listed on the Wall of Names in the Park for Peace at Villa Grimaldi.
