= Complejo Forestal y Maderero Panguipulli =

Defunct Chilean state-owned company

Complejo Forestal y Maderero Panguipulli was a Chilean state-owned company that managed forested lands as well as sawmills in the Valdivian Cordillera from 1971 to 1988. CFMP managed more than 360,000 ha (890,000 acres) in the zones of Panguipulli, Neltume, Liquiñe and Chihuío, and had more than three thousand employees.

Main fundos of Complejo Forestal y Maderero Panguipulli were, from north to south:

- Trafún
- Paimún
- Punire-Releco
- Toledo
- Neltume-Carranco
- Quechomalal
- Pirihueico
- Chan Chan
- Enco
- Pilmaiquén
- Arquilhue
- Maihue
- Carrán

As of 1972 the fundos Neltume and Puñire-Releco had the largest numbers of workers with 470 and 270 employees respectively.

== History ==
In 1971 after several land occupations in the zone of Neltume informally known as Operación ardillas (Spanish for Operation Squirrels) the government of the UP expropriated the fundo Carranes from the Sociaded Agrícola y Maderera de Neltume creating the Complejo Maderero Panguipulli merging with it other expropriated lands reaching an area of 360.000 ha of wooded terrain. Property in Liquiñe and Chihuío, localities outside the proper Neltume area, were also placed under the Complejo Maderero Panguipulli. In 1972 president Salvador Allende visited Neltume.

In the mid-1970s Aysén Region's CONAF chief Tomás Monfil was installed as director of the enterprise. He started a policy of sustainable development and responsible forest management avoiding monoculture and substitution of native species. During the military regime, Julio Ponce Lerou, son-in-law of Augusto Pinochet, became president of Complejo Forestal y Maderero Panguipulli, a post he held until 1982. He was simultaneously president of CELCO, another forestry company. During its existence Complejo Forestal y Maderero Panguipulli faced several problems such as military interventions and participation of its workers in resistance against the Military Regime, as well as the installment of guerrillas in its lands during the years of 1980–1981.

During the later days of the Pinochet Regime the neoliberal policies of the Chicago Boys were applied, substantially reducing state property holdings. CFMP land was divided and sold under obscure circumstances to Chilean billionaires, among them Andrónico Luksic, whose family now owns Fundo Chanchan and Fundo Enco along the Enco River as well as other properties around Neltume. Another wealthy businessman, Víctor Petermann, took control of Fundo Pilmaiquen and established the Huilo-Huilo Biological Reserve in 1999. It is dedicated to both ecotourism and preservation of biodiversity. Complejo Forestal y Maderero Panguipulli effectively ceased to exist in 1988.

== Sources ==
- Homenaje al Sivicultor Don Tomás Monfil
