= Huilo-Huilo Biological Reserve =

Private protected area in Chile

Coordinates: 39°51′12″S 71°57′16″W

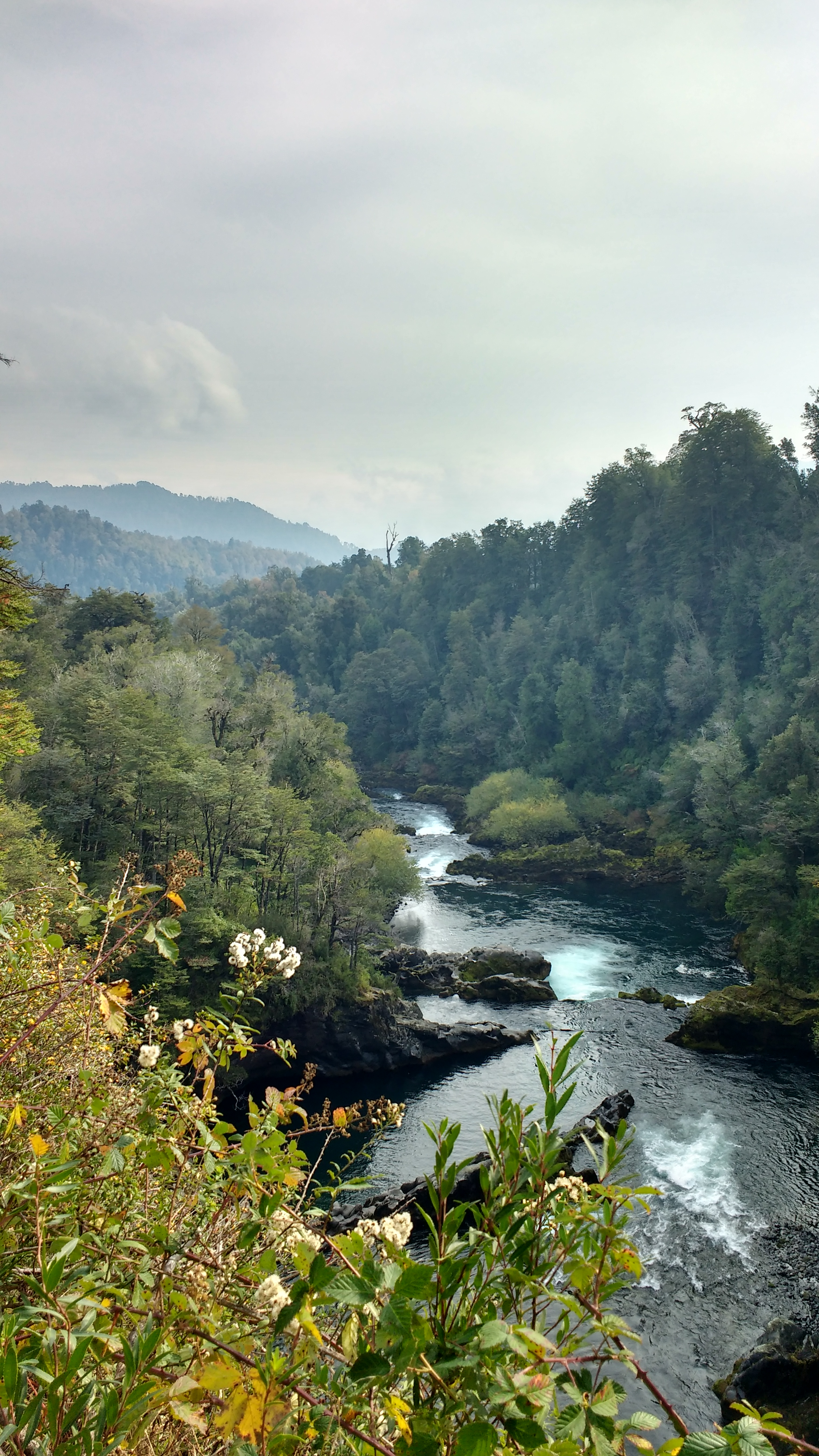
Falls at Huilo-Huilo

Huilo-Huilo Biological Reserve (Spanish pronunciation: [ˈwilo ˈwilo] audio, Pronounced: /ˈwiːloʊ ˈwiːloʊ/ WEEL-oh-WEEL-oh) is a private for profit natural reserve and ecotourism area in southern Chile. It is by the community of Neltume along the international road to Hua Hum Pass near the border to Argentina. The reserve has unique hotels, including Montana Mágica, the Nothofagus hotel, cabins, and a lodge for backpackers. The grounds also include a brewery, various animal habitats, a funicular, and many miles of trails. The reserve includes many waterfalls and the eastern slopes of Mocho-Choshuenco, a glacial compound stratovolcano.

== History ==
In the 1960 and 1970s, prior to the creation of the reserve, the area had a strong lumberjack-campesino labour movement. It was for this reason that Revolutionary Left Movement chose it to create a focus of resistance inspired by the Fidel Castro's 26th of July Movement in the Sierra Maestra in order to combat Pinochet's dictatorship. The Chilean army succeeded in isolating the group by August 1981 and in October of the same year its last members were captured.

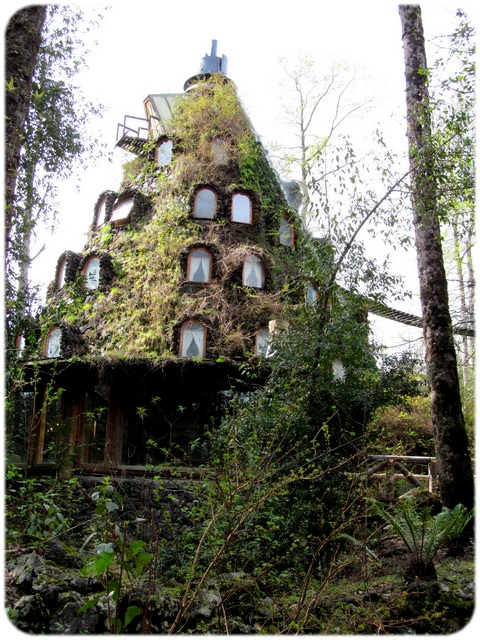
Magic Mountain Hotel

The reserve was created in 1999 and includes 600 km^{2} (232 sq mi) of native forest in Chile dedicated to wildlife conservation and tourism. The reserve is owned by the businessman Víctor Petermann who bought it in the 1990s during land sale program of the late Pinochet dictatorship. It had been part of the state-owned forestry operations of Complejo Forestal y Maderero Panguipulli.

== Location ==
The reserve is in an area of temperate rainforest northeast of the Mocho-Choshuenco volcano in Los Ríos Region. The main entrance is on the international gravel road that connects Panguipulli with San Martín de los Andes, Argentina.

In order to reach San Martín de los Andes from the west, one must travel through the Hua Hum Pass. After leaving Chile route 203 in Puerto Fuy, one must board the Barcaza Hua Hum a ferry that crosses Pirihueico Lake in approximately 90 minutes. After crossing Pirihueico Lake, the ferry arrives at Pirihueico, the last Chilean outpost before the Hua Hum Pass and eventually Ruta 4 in Argentina

The nearest town to Huilo-Huilo is Neltume, the site of a 1981 violent episode between members of MIR, and members of the military dictatorship in Chile. Traditional celebrations are held in the reserve area and folklore is part of the local school curriculum.

== Biota ==
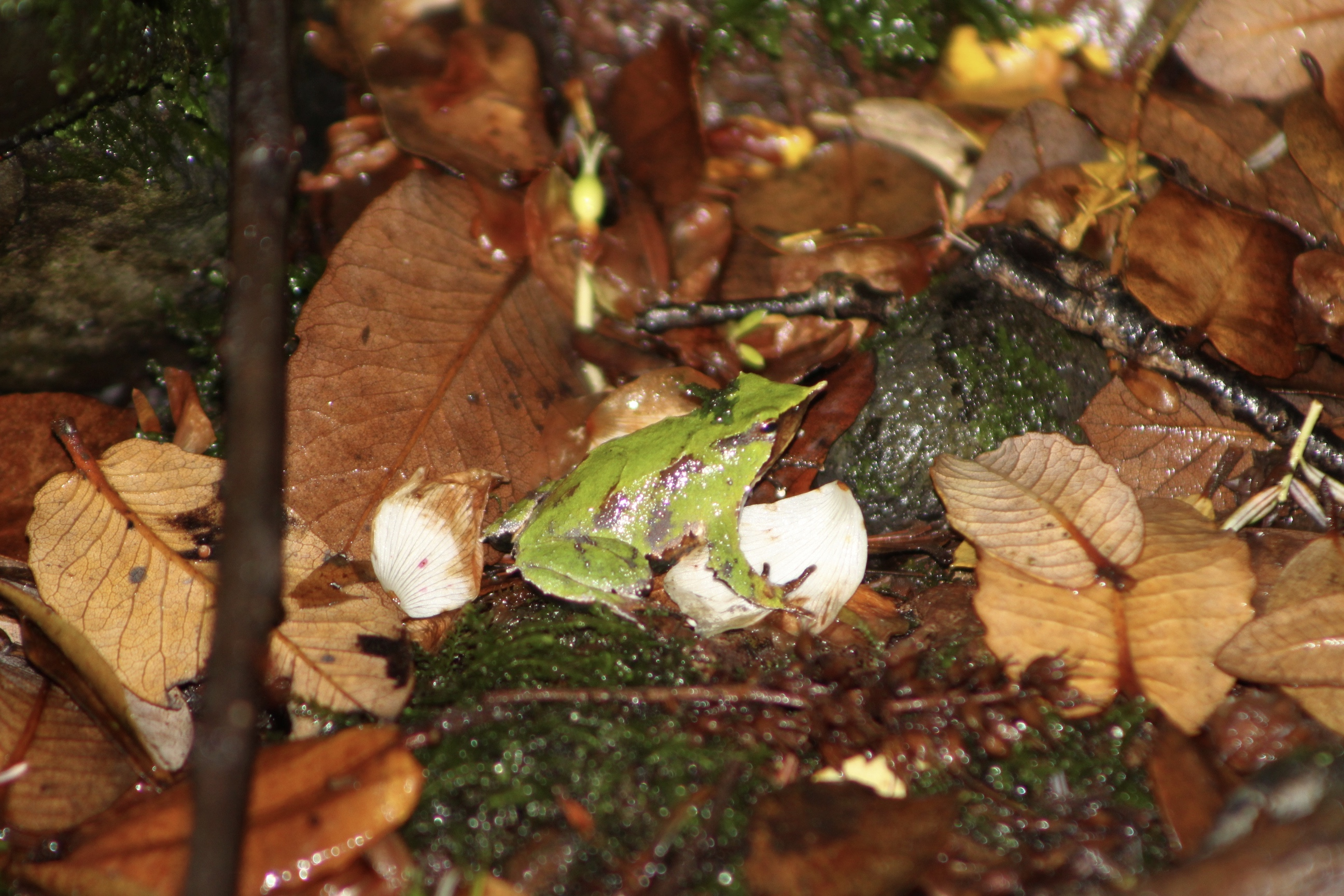
Male Darwin frog (Rhinoderma darwinii) in brooding colors

Huemuls were reintroduced to the reserve in 2005 from southern Aysen and Guanacos have also been re-introduced. The populations of Darwin frogs (Rhinoderma darwinii) and puma are being monitored at the reserve. Lizards are also present. The reserve includes a Forest of Deer park. Mushrooms grow in the reserve. Plant species include Chile's national flower, Lapageria (Common name copihue).

== Huilo-Huilo Falls ==
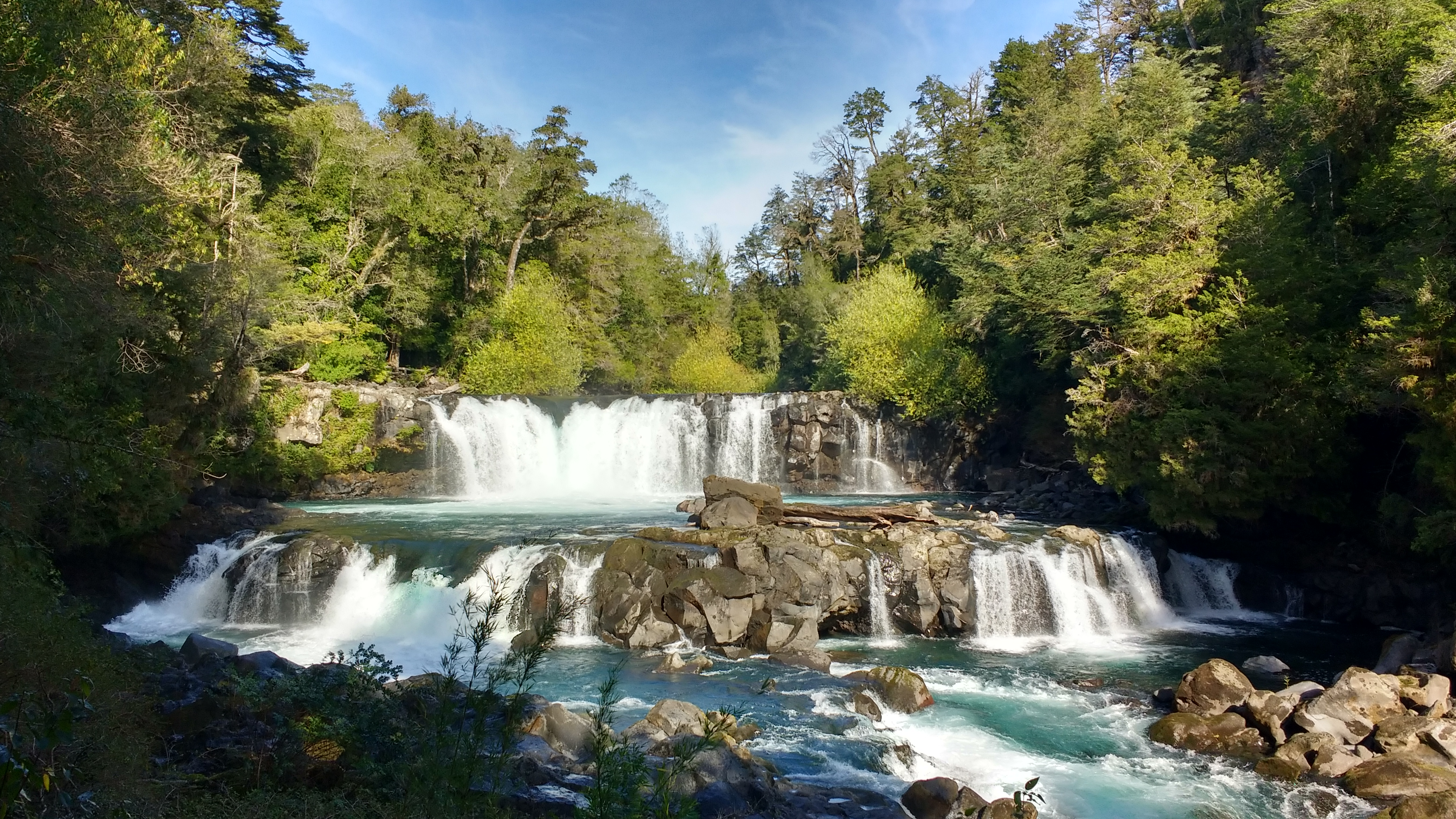
De la Leona Waterfall

Huilo-Huilo Falls is a stretch of waterfalls and rapids along the Fuy River in the reserve. The waters of the Huilo-Huilo Falls originate in Lácar Lake in Argentina. During the summer it frequently dries, as consequence of low precipitation and subterranean runoff. As consequence of this infiltration a large aquifer is situated under Mocho-Choshuenco volcano. Contact between the water of the aquifer and magma may have caused the explosive phreatic eruptions, that created the Tumba del Buey (bull's tomb) crater on the western flank of the volcano.

== Víctor Petermann ==
Peterman is a businessman and private forest reserve owner in Chile. In the 1970s, Petermann acquired 120,000-hectares (297,000 acres) of state owned forestry lands in the Los Rios region. He established the Huilo Huilo Biological Reserve nature preserve and eco-tourism destination on the lands in the mid-1980s. The project transformed the area from a lumber-dependent economy to tourism. Petermann's ex-wife Ivonne Reifschneider was involved in the reserve project.

Peterman owns holding company Tehmcorp, that controls various businesses including mining operations and tourism businesses.

== Gallery ==
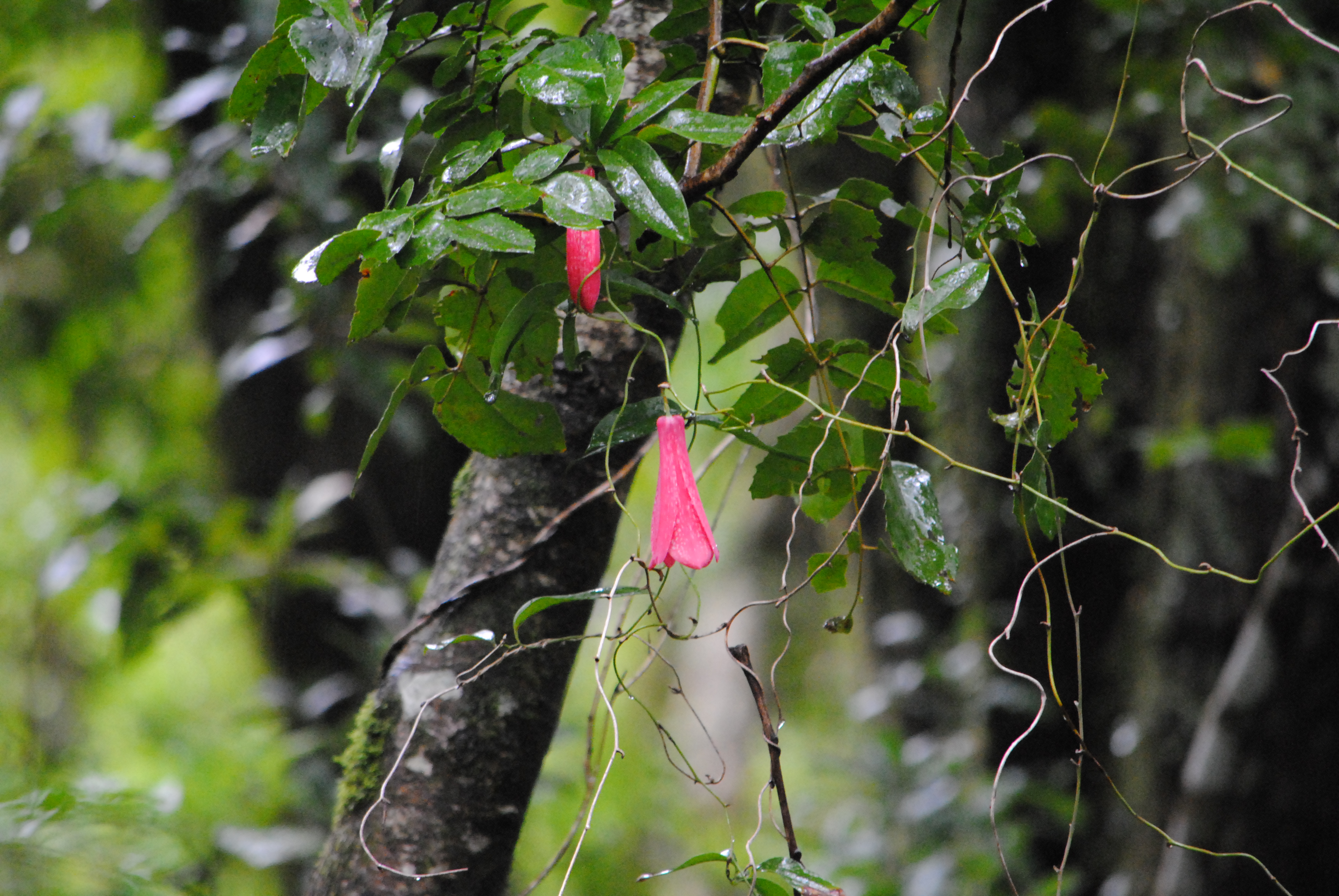
Copihues, Chile's national flower, growing at the reserve

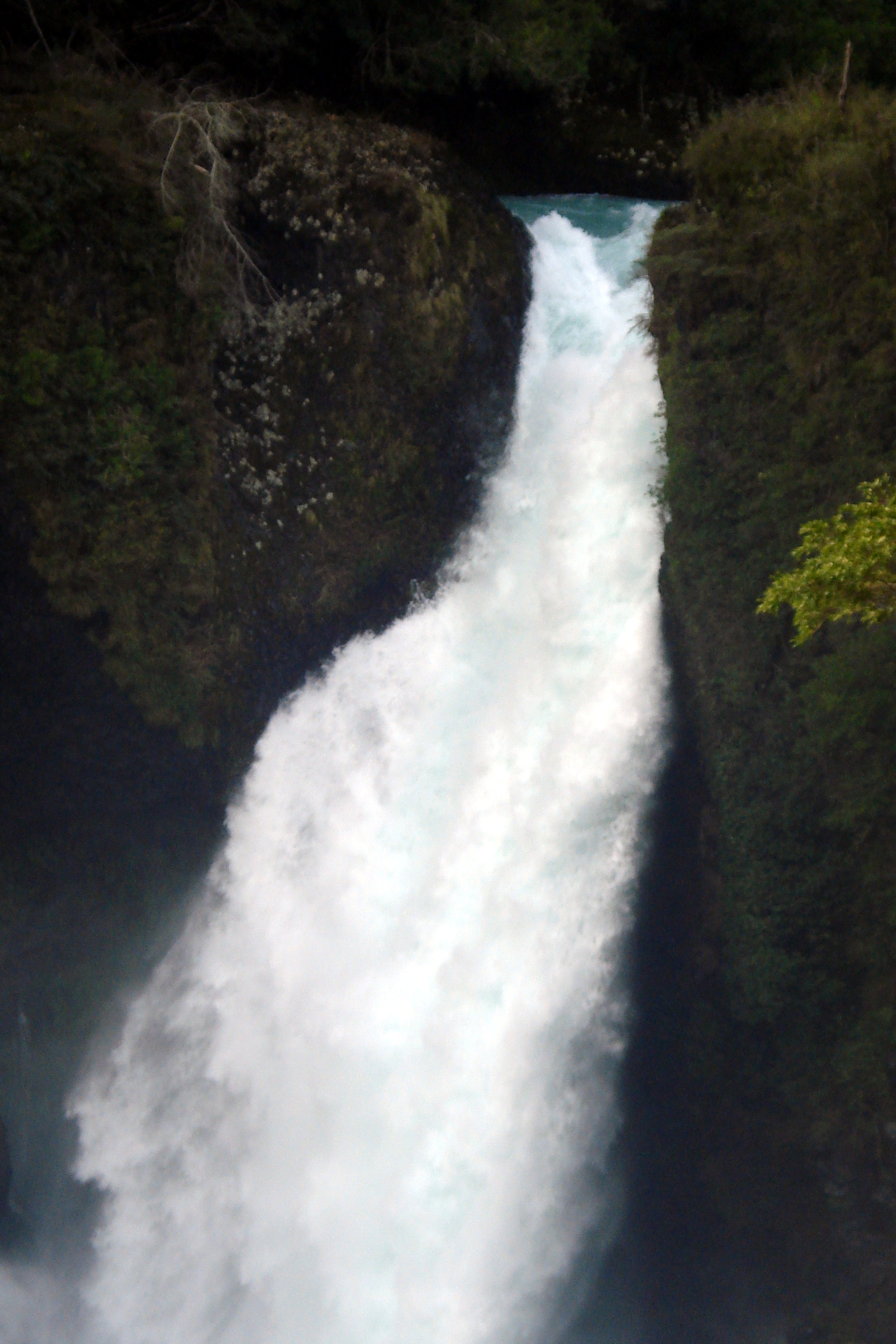
Waterfall

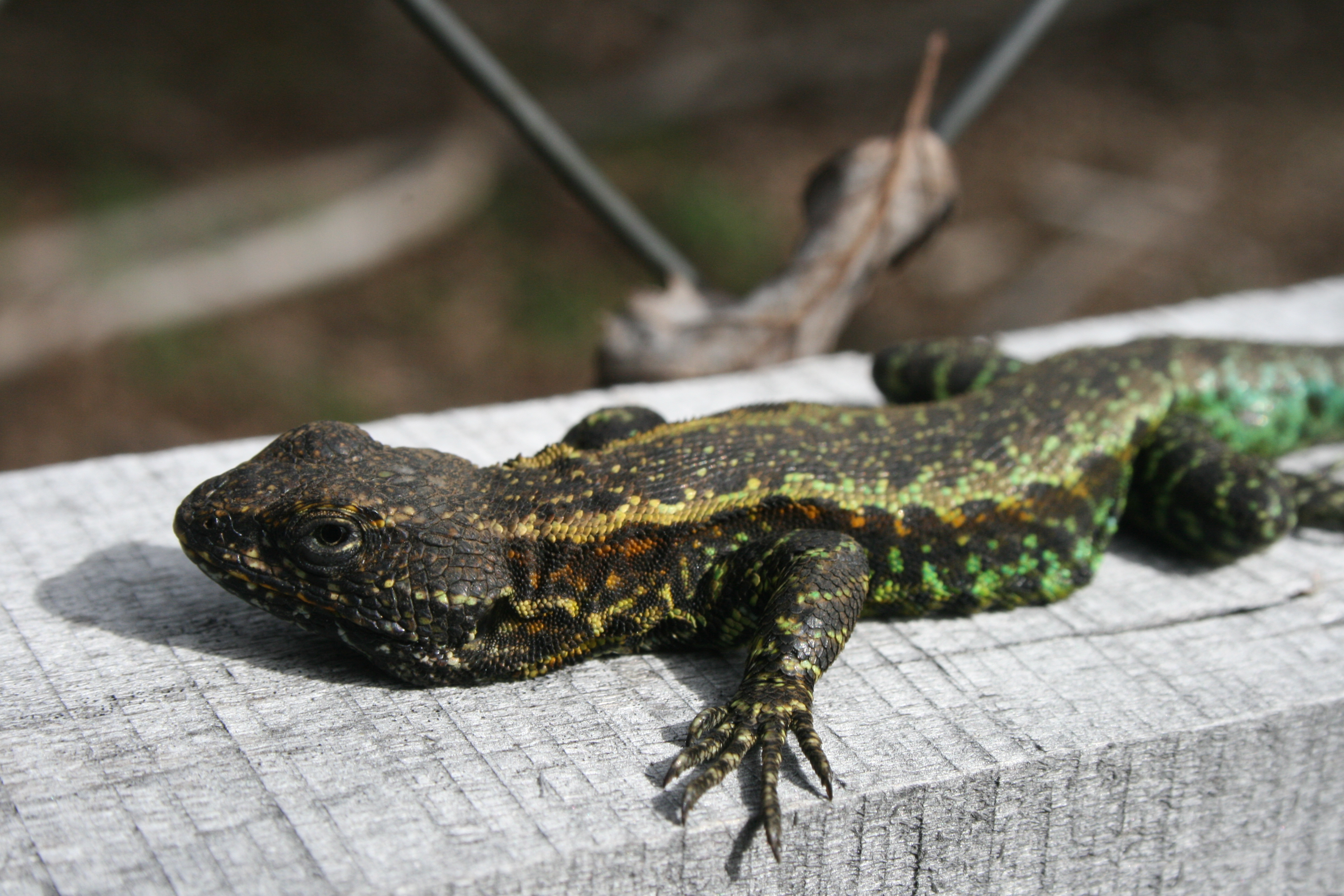
Lizard

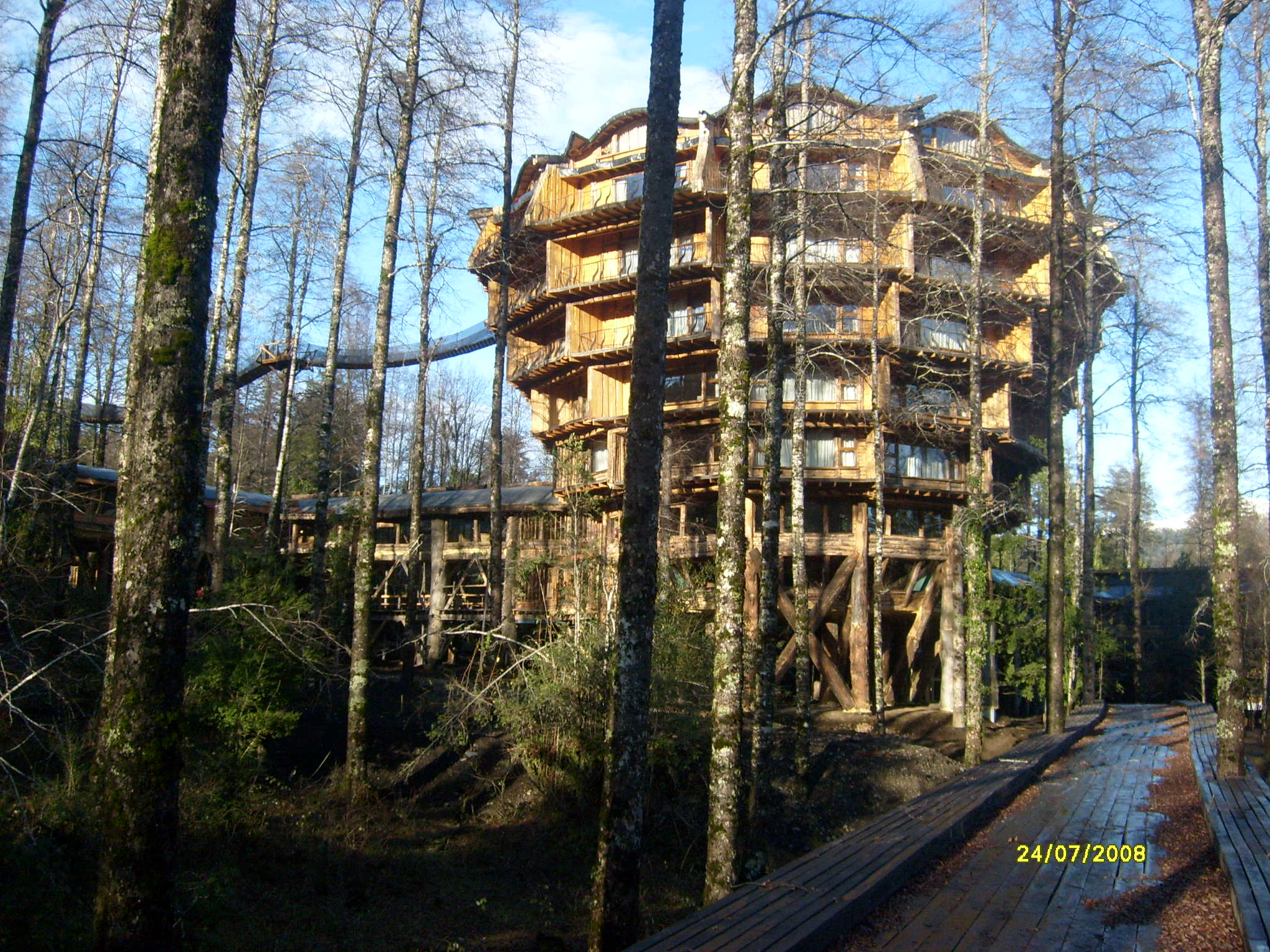
Hotel Baobab

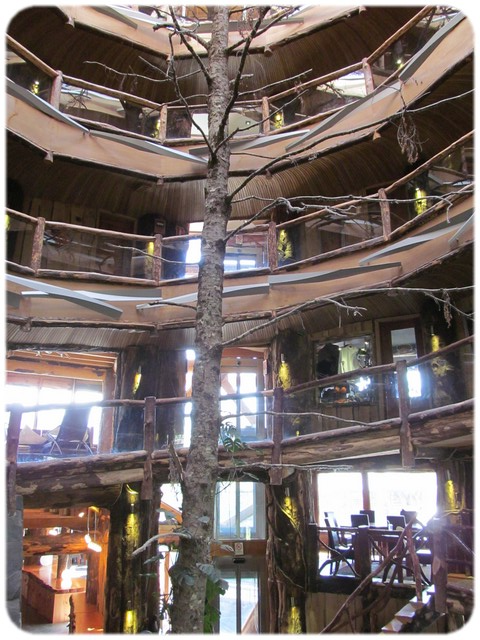
Hotel Baobab

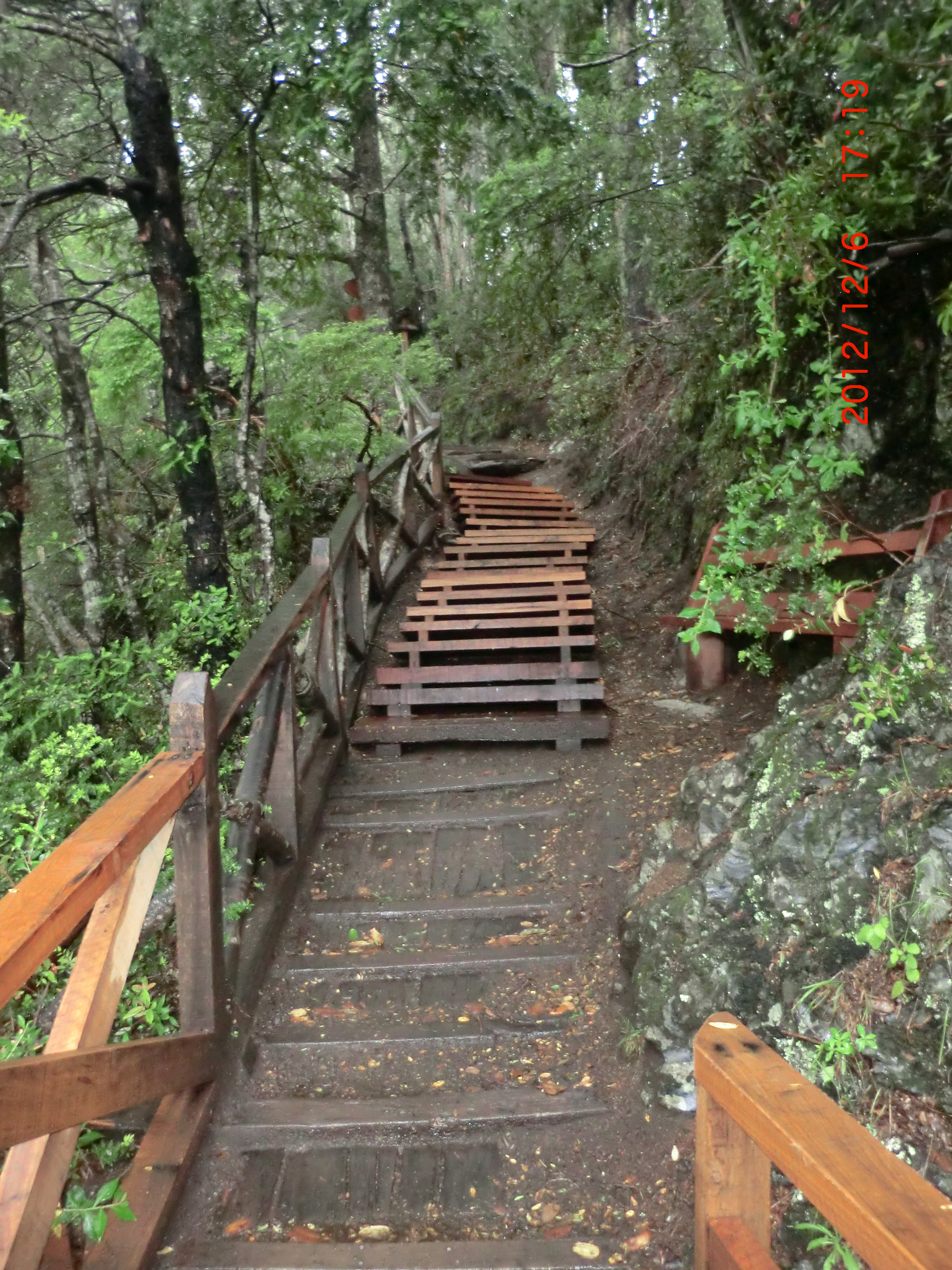
Trail along the slope of the falls at Huilo-Huilo

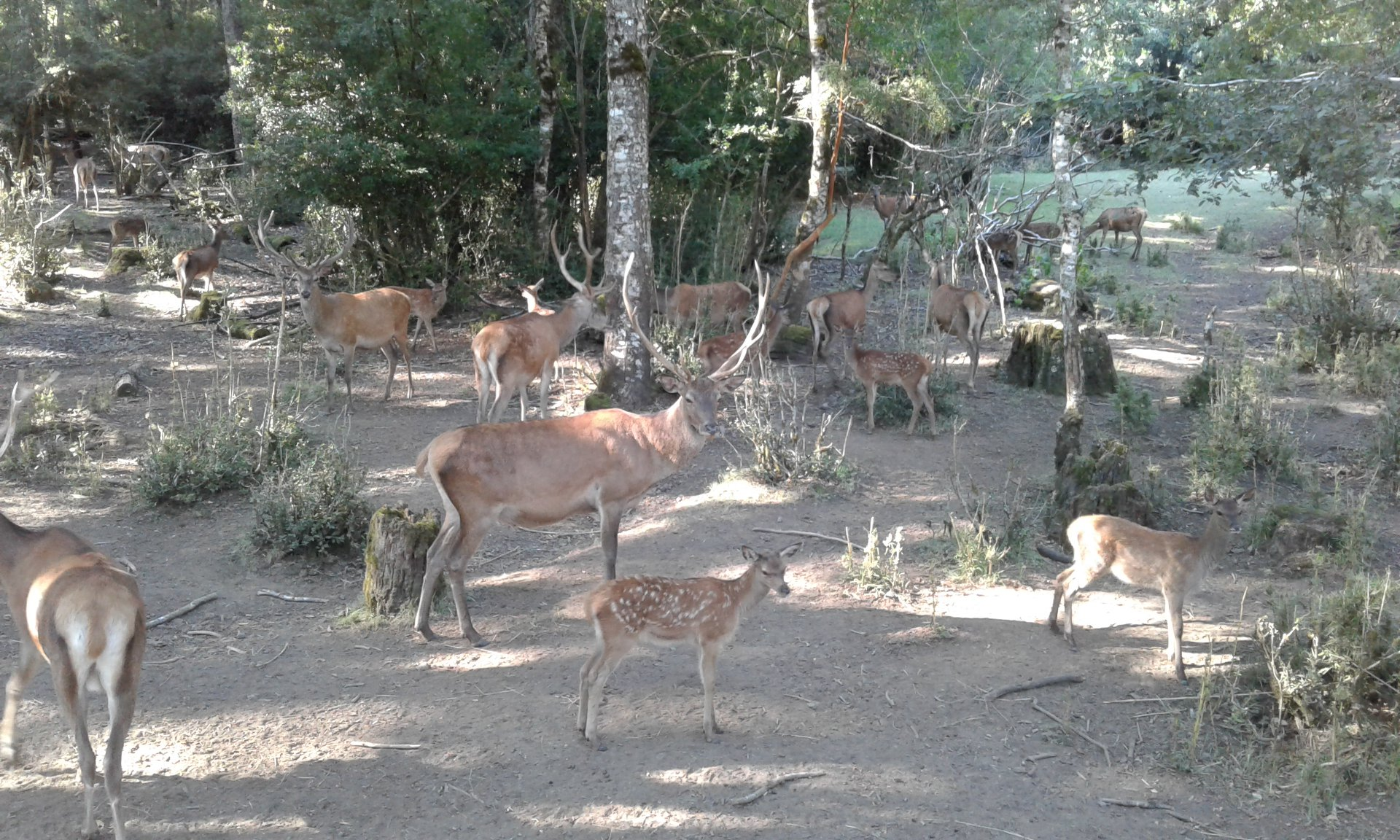
Deer in the local deer farm

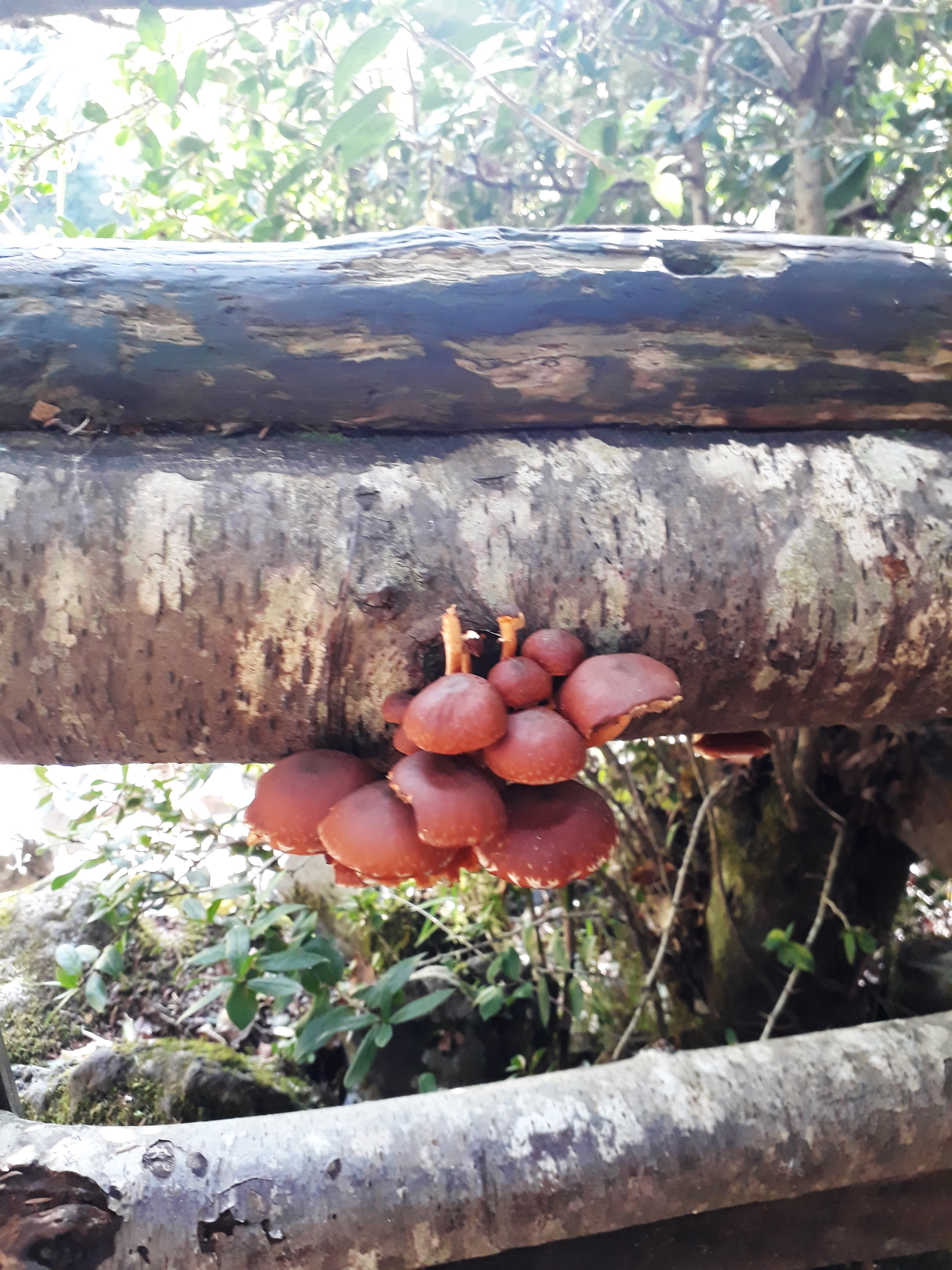
Mushrooms

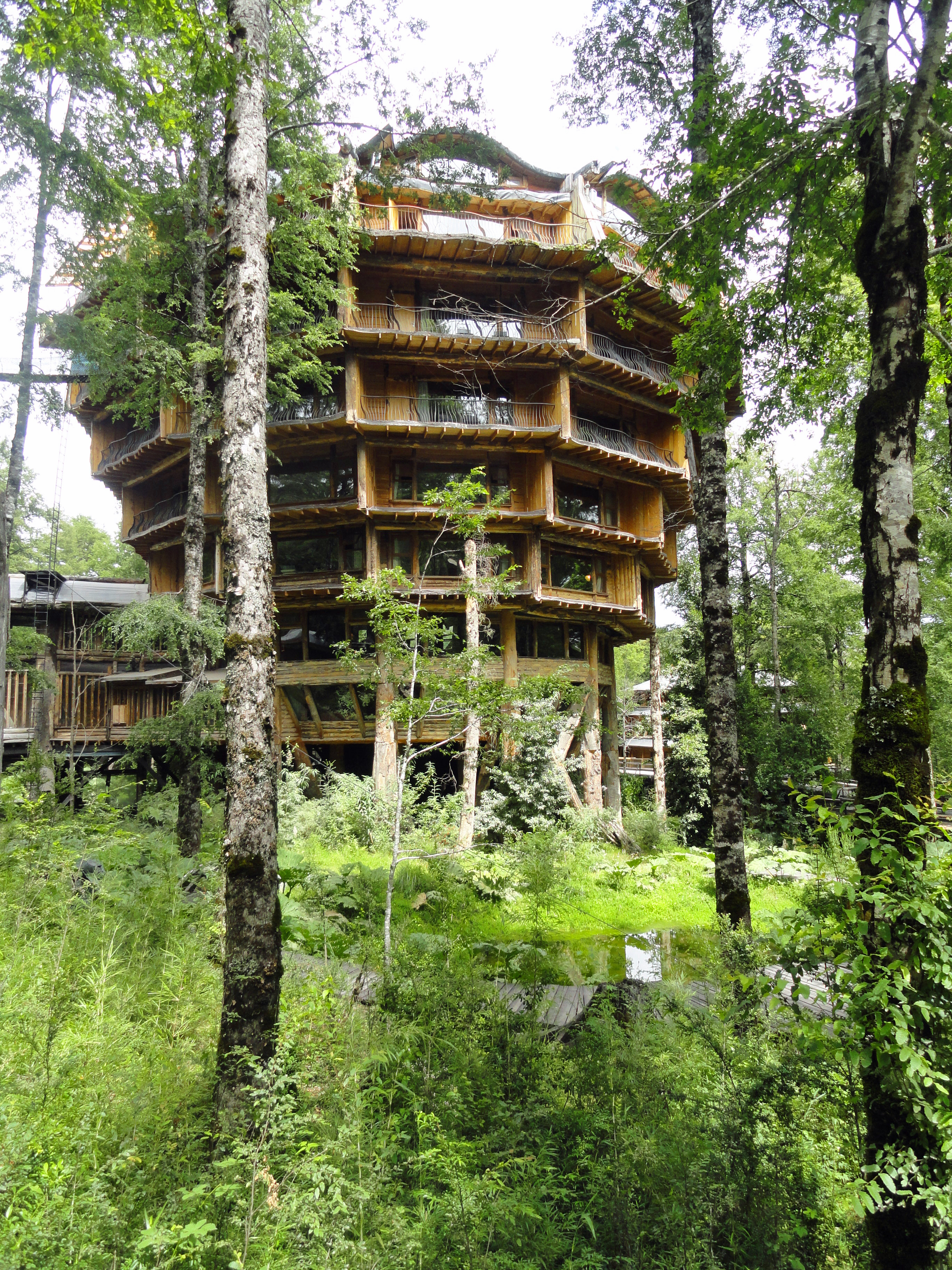
Hotel Nothofagus

== See also ==
- List of waterfalls
