= Federation of Student Centres of the University of Chile =

The Federation of Student Centres of the University of Chile (FECECh) was a short-lived organization that claimed to represent all the students enrolled in undergraduate and post-graduate courses at the University of Chile. Fecech was created in 1978 during the military dictatorship of Pinochet following the suppression of the original University of Chile Student Federation (FECh) in the aftermath of the 1973 Chilean coup d'état.

One of FECECh's most important presidents was Pablo Longueira.

FECECh was slowly displaced by unofficial democratic student centres. This tendency accelerated in 1983 leading to the refoundation of the FECh. On June 9, 1984, FECECh recognised their de facto marginalization and dissolved itself.
