= Pablo Longueira =

Chilean politician (born 1958)

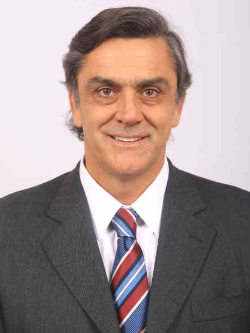
- Longueira in 2011

Minister of Economy, Development and Tourism of Chile
- In office 18 July 2011 – 29 April 2013
- Preceded by: Juan Andrés Fontaine
- Succeeded by: Félix de Vicente

Member of the Senate of Chile
- In office 11 March 2006 – 18 July 2011
- Preceded by: Carlos Bombal
- Succeeded by: Ena von Baer
- Constituency: 8th Circumscription

Member of the Chamber of Deputies
- In office 11 March 2002 – 11 March 2006
- Preceded by: María Rozas Velásquez
- Succeeded by: Karla Rubilar
- Constituency: 17th District (Conchalí, Huechuraba and Renca)
- In office 11 March 1990 – 11 March 2002
- Preceded by: Creation of the position
- Succeeded by: José Antonio Kast
- Constituency: 30th District (Buin, Calera de Tango, Paine and San Bernardo)

Personal details
- Born: Juan Pablo Longueira Montes; 12 August 1958 (age 68) Osorno, Chile
- Party: Independent Democratic Union
- Spouse: Cecilia Brinkmann Estévez
- Children: Seven
- Education: University of Chile
- Occupation: Politician
- Profession: Civil engineer

Juan Pablo Longueira Montes (born August 12, 1958) is a Chilean politician and civil engineer who served as Minister of Economy, Development and Tourism of Chile from 2011 to 2013. He was a founding member of the Independent Democratic Union (UDI) being very close to Jaime Guzmán.

Within the UDI he led the social-conservative camp, which coexisted with Jovino Novoa's liberal-conservative faction. The faction led by Longueira was characterised by its political work in poor sectors.

During the 1980s, he earned a reputation of a boots on the ground politician who aided shanty town dwellers. Longueira served as a Senator before being appointed by President Sebastián Piñera to serve in the Cabinet. He was previously a deputy from 1990 until 2006.

Following a retirement from politics since his aborted presidential candidacy in 2013 in 2020 Longueira announced his return to politics. His comeback has so far been marked by failed bids to the UDI presidency and the Constitutional Convention and the voluntary end of his membership in UDI.

In connection to his ministerial work during the first Piñera administration Longuera is facing corruption charges, including bribery and tax evasion.

== Biography ==
=== Early life ===
Longeira begun his political career in 1981 when he was appointed president of FECECh, an organisation aimed to replace the original student federation of the University of Chile which was staunchly anti-Pinochet. His first speech at University of Chile Student Federation was written by his mentor Jaime Guzmán. In 1986 he led a picket against US senator Ted Kennedy who was visiting Chile.

== Political career ==
On March 30, 2007, he launched his candidacy for President in the 2009 presidential election, but cancelled his bid on May 3.

On April 29, 2013, Mr. Longueira was nominated by the UDI as its candidate for the 2013 presidential election, replacing Laurence Golborne. On 30 June 2013, Longueira won the primary election of the right-wing coalition Alianza por Chile with the 51.37% of the vote against the candidate of National Renewal, Andrés Allamand, becoming the only candidate of the coalition for the 2013 presidential election. On 17 July 2013, Longueira abruptly withdrew his candidature, citing personal health problems as a reason.

In connection to his ministerial work during the first Piñera administration Longuera is facing corruption charges, including bribery (cohecho) and tax evasion (delito tributario). The case involve the scandal-ridden SQM. Longueira himself has complained about the extraordinary lengthiness of the case, and that he seem to have been de facto condemned beforehand.

Besides the SQM case Longueira has also been involved in a separate corruption case involving the Fishing Law (Ley de Pesca) albeit he is not facing charges there. The Fishing Law or Ley Longueira, after longueira who sponsored the law bill, is suspected of having been approved in Congress with the aid of bribery. Longuiera has testified in favour of former UDI deputy Jaime Orpis, who just like him is facing bribery charges.

Seven years after his retirement from politics in 2020 Longueira announced his return to politics and his intention run for the presidency of UDI. On January 6, 2021 Longueira renounced his lifelong membership in UDI, aiming to run as an independent in the Constitutional Convention election. Longueira failed however to find support from the president of UDI to inscribe his candidacy. Longueira accuses a political maneuver on part of UDI's leadership. According to pundit Víctor Muñoz the renunciation of Longueira reflects a decline of the leadership of the UDI founders.

He is married to Cecilia Brinkmann Estévez and has seven children. Longueira is a Roman Catholic.
