= José Liendo =

José Gregorio Liendo, a.k.a. "Comandante Pepe", Chilean political leader, university student, and MCR-MIR militant.

José Gregorio Liendo Vera (1945 – October 3, 1973), also known as "Compañero Pepe", "Comandante Pepe" or "Loco Pepe" was a Chilean political activist and militant of the Revolutionary Left Movement ("Movimiento de Izquierda Revolucionaria"; "MIR"), a Marxist-Leninist and Guevarist guerrilla and political movement. He was also a leader and a member of the "Movimiento Campesino Revolucionario" (MCR), the MIR's Front of the Masses ("Frente de Masas") among the Chilean peasantry, which participated in the occupation of large estates (fundos) during the presidency of Salvador Allende in the early 1970s.

He and other militants of the MCR-MIR planned and carried out the attack on the police station of Neltume on September 12, 1973, the day after the 1973 Chilean coup d'etat. He had originally moved into the zone of Neltume in the 1960s, after quitting his Agronomy studies in the University of Concepción. Liendo was executed in the prison of Isla Teja by a firing squad on October 3, 1973, after a "war council" accused him of having led the guerrilla warfare assault the police Neltume's station and the robbery and assault of Antonieta Macchi Bonadey's farm in November 1970, which led to her suicide.

== Sources ==
- José Gregorio LIENDO VERA, Memoria Viva. Retrieved 27 September 2009.
- Guzmán reconstituye asalto a retén Neltume, El Mercurio. Published April 13, 2003. retrieved 27 September 2009.
- Violencia y muerte en el campo chileno, Economía y Sociedad nº97. Retrieved October 2018.
