= Julio Lagos Cosgrove =

Chilean politician

Julio Lagos
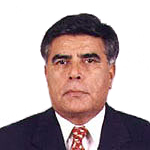

Member of the Senate
- In office 11 March 1990 – 11 March 2002
- Preceded by: District created
- Succeeded by: Jaime Orpis
- Constituency: 1st Circunscription

Personal details
- Born: 20 July 1943 (age 82) Iquique, Chile
- Party: National Renewal (RN)
- Spouse: Pilar Lira
- Children: 6
- Occupation: Politician

Julio Eloy Lagos Cosgrove (born 20 July 1943) is a Chilean politician, who served as senator.

Transport union leader and politician. He served as Senator for the 1st Senatorial Constituency, Tarapacá Region, between 1990 and 1998.

== Biography ==
=== Family and youth ===
He was born in Iquique, Chile, on 20 June 1943. He is the son of José Julio Lagos Cano and Eloisa Cosgrove Arenas.

He married Pilar Lira Moller and is the father of six children.

=== Professional career ===
He completed his primary education at Public School No. 16 in Iquique and his secondary education at the Liceo de Hombres of the same city, from which he graduated.

In his youth, at the age of 18, he had a notable participation in the South American Games, winning first place in the discus throw. Two years later, in 1964, he attended the Tokyo Olympic Games in Japan.

At an early age, he joined the transport sector, standing out as a leader at both the regional and national levels.

== Political career ==
His political career began as a leader of the Association of Truck Owners of Iquique, serving as its president in 1970.

In 1973, he served as president of the Provincial Federation of Truck Owners of Tarapacá. During the government of the Popular Unity coalition (1970–1973), he actively participated in the truck owners' strike against the government. In 1976, he was appointed Secretary General of the Confederation of Truck Owners of Chile, a position he held until 1982, when he became president of the organization.

Between 1985 and 1989, he served as vice president, representing Chile, of the Latin American Transport Association (ATALAC).

On 24 October 1985, he was appointed a member of the Economic and Social Council.

In the first parliamentary elections of 1989, he ran as an independent candidate for the Senate representing the 1st Senatorial Constituency, Tarapacá Region, for the 1990–1994 term, within the Democracy and Progress pact. He obtained the second-highest vote total in the constituency with 42,079 votes, equivalent to 26.02% of the valid votes cast.

On 13 March 1990, two days after being sworn in as Senator, he joined the National Renewal party, assuming the position of vice president of its Political Commission.

In the parliamentary elections held on 11 December 1993, he was re-elected Senator for the 1st Senatorial Constituency, Tarapacá Region, for the 1994–1998 term, within the Union for the Progress of Chile pact. He obtained 41,328 votes, corresponding to 25.54% of the valid votes cast.

In 2001, he sought a third re-election for the 1st Senatorial Constituency, Tarapacá Region, for the 2002–2010 term, but was defeated by his running mate Jaime Orpis. In that election, he obtained 24,844 votes, equivalent to 16.08% of the valid votes cast.

In the parliamentary elections of 2005, he ran for the Chamber of Deputies representing the 2nd District of the Tarapacá Region, on behalf of the Independent Democratic Union, for the 2006–2010 term. He obtained 16,493 votes, corresponding to 18.06% of the total votes, but was not elected. In 2009, he ran again, representing National Renewal, for a Senate seat in the 1st Senatorial Constituency, Tarapacá Region. He obtained 12,348 votes, equivalent to 7.33%, and was not elected.
