= Luis Felipe Céspedes =

Chilean minister (born 1970)

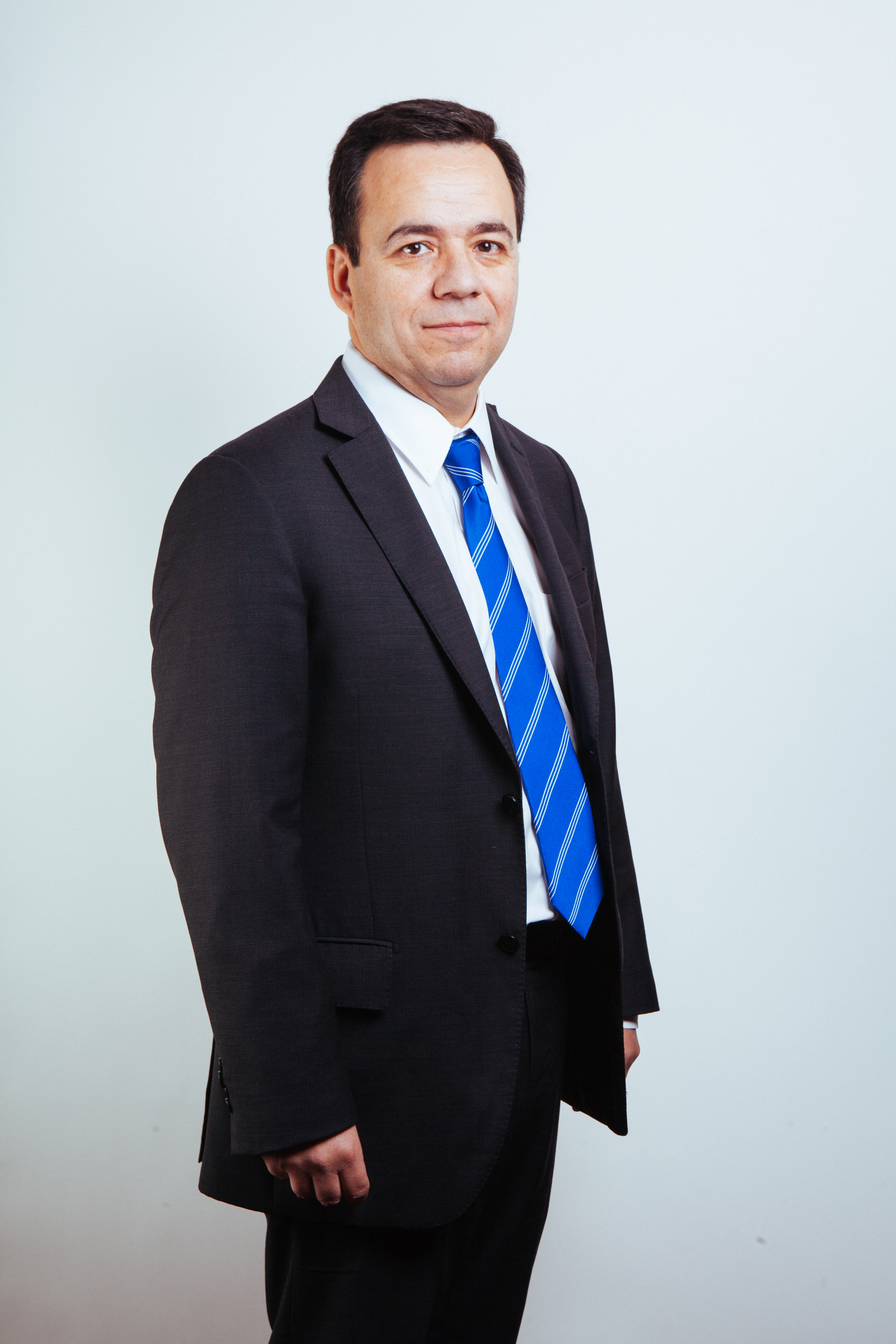
- Official portrait (2017)

Minister of Economy
- In office 11 March 2014 – 31 August 2017
- President: Michelle Bachelet
- Preceded by: Félix de Vicente
- Succeeded by: Jorge Rodríguez Grossi

Personal details
- Born: 17 October 1970 (age 55) Santiago, Chile
- Party: Christian Democratic Party
- Education: Pontifical Catholic University of Chile (B.Sc); New York University (PhD)
- Occupation: Politician
- Profession: Economist

Luis Felipe Céspedes Cifuentes (born 17 October 1970) is a Chilean politician and economist who served as minister of Economy.

He is the current counselor of the Central Bank of Chile.

== Early life and education ==
Céspedes is the son of Luis Abraham Céspedes Núñez and Irene Montserrat Cifuentes Pulgar. Since 1996, he has been married to psychologist María Isabel Rojas Corvalán.

He studied economics and business administration at the Pontifical Catholic University of Chile and later earned a PhD in economics from New York University in the United States.

== Professional career ==
Céspedes served as manager of economic research at the Central Bank of Chile. He later worked as coordinator of economic policy and chief economic adviser at the Ministry of Finance between 2006 and 2009.

He has also been a visiting researcher at the Research Department of the International Monetary Fund (IMF), the Inter-American Development Bank (IDB), and the Department of Economics at Rutgers University in the United States. In addition, he has taught macroeconomics and international economics at the University of Chile and the Pontifical Catholic University of Chile.

Céspedes has written extensively on fiscal, monetary, and exchange-rate policy, as well as on financial crises. His work has appeared in academic journals including the American Economic Review, IMF Staff Papers, International Finance, and the Journal of Development Economics. He has also contributed chapters to several books on macroeconomics and international finance, and has served as editor of two books and the academic journal Economía Chilena.

He is currently a professor at the Faculty of Economics and Business, University of Chile (FEN).

== Political career ==
On 11 March 2014, Céspedes was appointed Minister of Economy, Development and Tourism by President Michelle Bachelet. He resigned on 31 August 2017 following the rejection of the Dominga mine project by the Committee of Ministers, and was succeeded by Jorge Rodríguez Grossi.

In November 2021, President Sebastián Piñera nominated Céspedes to the board of the Central Bank of Chile to replace Joaquín Vial. After his appointment was unanimously approved by the Senate of Chile, he took office on 6 February 2022.
