= Jaime Orpis =

Chilean politician

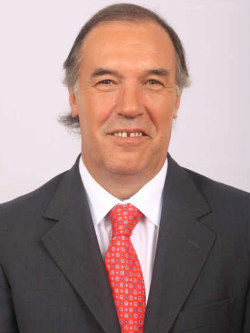

Member of the Senate of Chile
- In office 11 March 2002 – 11 March 2018
- Preceded by: Julio Lagos Cosgrove
- Succeeded by: José Durana
- Constituency: 1st Circumscription

Member of the Chamber of Deputies
- In office 11 March 1990 – 11 March 2002
- Preceded by: District established
- Succeeded by: Felipe Salaberry
- Constituency: 25th District

Mayor of San Joaquín
- In office 27 July 1987 – July 1989
- Appointed by: Augusto Pinochet
- Preceded by: Office established
- Succeeded by: Alberto Lira

Personal details
- Born: 16 September 1966 (age 60) Santiago, Chile
- Party: Independent Democratic Union (UDI)
- Spouse: Ana Luisa Jouanne
- Children: Three
- Parent(s): Antonio Orpis; Olga Bouchón
- Education: Pontifical Catholic University of Chile (LL.B)
- Occupation: Politician
- Profession: Lawyer

Jaime Antonio Orpis Bouchón (born 16 September 1956) is a Chilean politician who served as Senator and Deputy for his country.

He served as a Senator for the 1st Senatorial District, representing the Tarapacá Region and the Arica and Parinacota Region, for two consecutive terms between 2002 and 2018. Previously, he was a Member of the Chamber of Deputies for District No. 25 in the Metropolitan Region of Santiago, serving three consecutive terms from 1990 to 2002.

He also served as mayor of the Municipality of San Joaquín between 1987 and 1989.

== Early life and education ==
Orpis was born in Santiago on 16 September 1956. He is the son of Antonio Segundo Orpis Birchmeir and Olga Emilia Bouchon González. He is married to Ana María Luisa Jouanne Langlois and has four children.

He completed his secondary education at The Grange School, graduating in 1974. He later studied law at the Pontifical Catholic University of Chile, where he obtained his law degree.

=== Professional career ===
Orpis served as chief of staff at the Municipality of Renca. He later became general director of the DUOC Academy and was a member of the commission responsible for the creation of the Municipality of San Joaquín, an area that had previously been part of the Municipality of San Miguel.

== Political career ==
Orpis began his political activities in 1981 as president of the student council of the Faculty of Law at the Pontifical Catholic University of Chile. In 1982, he was elected president of the Student Federation of the university (FEUC).

In 1987, he was appointed mayor of San Joaquín, a position he held until 1989. During his administration, he implemented housing allocation programs for low-income families, upgraded local health facilities, expanded computer systems in municipal schools, introduced vocational workshops in primary education, founded the Small Business House, and implemented an integrated municipal management system supported by computer technology.

In July 1989, he resigned from his position as mayor to run as a candidate for the Independent Democratic Union (UDI) for the Chamber of Deputies in the Metropolitan Region. He was elected deputy for three consecutive terms between 1990 and 2002 and later served as senator until 2018.

On 6 January 2016, Orpis resigned from the UDI. He was stripped of parliamentary immunity from 4 January 2016 until the end of his term, while being investigated by the Public Prosecutor’s Office in connection with the Corpesca case.
