= Julio Ponce Lerou =

Chilean forest engineer and businessperson (born 1945)

- Born: Julio César Ponce Lerou; November 13, 1945 (age 80); La Calera, Chile
- Education: University of Chile
- Occupation: Businessman
- Spouse: Verónica Pinochet Hiriart (m. 1969; div. 1995)
- Children: 4
- Family: Former son-law of Augusto Pinochet

Julio Ponce Lerou is a Chilean forest engineer and businessman who is the principal shareholder of Soquimich, the largest lithium producer in the world. He is a former son-in-law of Chilean dictator Augusto Pinochet. Ponce was president of Chilean state-owned forestry company Complejo Forestal y Maderero Panguipulli until 1982 while he was simultaneously president of CELCO, a wood pulp company.

As of 2014, Ponce is accused of a millionaire fraud and embezzlement that affects the pension funds of millions of Chilean citizens under what is known as the "Cascadas" case.

In his youth, he attended the University of Concepción, where studied medicine for a year. Then, he finished his Bachelor of Arts at the University of Chile.

== See also ==
- Crony capitalism
