= Revolutionary Left Movement (Chile) =

Chilean left-wing political organization

Revolutionary Left Movement Movimiento de Izquierda Revolucionaria
- General Secretary: Demetrio Hernández
- Founder: Miguel Enríquez
- Founded: 15 August 1965
- Ideology: Communism; Marxism–Leninism; Guevarism; Foco theory; Socialist patriotism; Revolutionary socialism
- Political position: Far-left
- National affiliation: People's Democratic Movement (1983-1987); Patriotic Union (2020-2022)
- Regional affiliation: São Paulo Forum
- Colours: Red, Black

Party flag

Website
- mir-chile.cl

The Revolutionary Left Movement (Spanish: Movimiento de Izquierda Revolucionaria, MIR) is a Chilean far-left Marxist-Leninist communist party and former urban guerrilla organization founded on 12 October 1965. At its height in 1973, the MIR numbered about 10,000 members and associates. The group emerged from various student organizations, mainly from University of Concepción, that had originally been active in the youth organization of the Socialist Party. They established a base of support among the trade unions and shantytowns of Concepción, Santiago, and other cities. Andrés Pascal Allende, a nephew of Salvador Allende, president of Chile from 1970 to 1973, was one of its early leaders. Miguel Enríquez was the General Secretary of the party from 1967 until his assassination in 1974 by the DINA.

Although it was involved in military actions and assassinations, particularly during the Resistance to the 1973 Chilean coup d'etat, the MIR states they reject assassination as a tactic (see below on the assassination of Edmundo Pérez Zujovic by the VOP).

== Before the coup ==
The Sino-Soviet ideological dispute, the Soviet Union's invasion of Czechoslovakia (and other Warsaw Pact etc. events), the presence of the Cuban Revolution in Latin America, and the emergent global student movement partially inspired by the thought Frankfurt School and the New Left (by the time of the early opposition to the Vietnam War) were the main ideological issues that the traditional Chilean left (the Socialist Party and the Communist Party) had to deal with amid their relative political stagnation in the beginning of the 1960s.

By the early 60s, amidst a political dominance of the right-wing and center-right wing parties strongly supporting US policies, the traditional left parties' "reformist" doctrine of a non-revolutionary road to socialism began to be questioned by different militant groups within those parties. The questioning for changes and the opposition against such changes resulted in several small groups or factions.

The Maoists left the Communist Party and the Socialist Party group of students. At the same time, since World War II, there were some minor Trotskyist formations and minor left-libertarian groups, which also had a discrete ideological influence in the student movement in Santiago and Concepción. The group led by Miguel Enríquez, temporarily allocated in the cell "Espartaco" at the Socialist Party, called itself the "Revolutionary Socialists" faction. It was formed by Miguel and Marco Antonio Enríquez, B. Van Schouwen, Marcello Ferrada de Noli (a left libertarian and then the leader of the socialist cell "Espartaco" in Concepción), and Jorge Gutiérrez. When this fraction was finally ousted from the Socialist Party (Senator Ampuero) in February 1964, it continued as an independent fraction until they merged in the organization VRM. There the young socialists met with Trotskyites, most of them twice their age.

When MIR was founded on 12 October 1965 at the locals of an anarchist union in Santiago, less than 100 participated, and all the above ideological tendencies were represented. Revolutionary socialists (by Miguel Enríquez and B. Van Schouwen), former communists (represented by the Maoist Cares), Trotskyists (by Dr. Enrique Sepúlveda and Marco Antonio Enríquez, Miguel Enríquez's brother), left-libertarians or social anarchists (by Marcello Ferrada de Noli), and anarcho-syndicalists (by Clotario Blest). It took some time before the MIR finally could achieve its ultimate identification as a solely Marxist-Leninist political organization, and this was the work of Miguel Enríquez for the two years to come.

The first document approved at MIR foundation congress was the "Tesis Insurreccional", the political-military theses of MIR. The document was written by Miguel Enríquez (Viriato), Marco Antonio Enríquez (Bravo), and Marcello Ferrada de Noli (Atacama), all three from Concepción. Two reasons explain this document and its co-authorship: The first is that the group of young students from Concepción led by Miguel Enríquez was the most numerous. The second is that the group from Concepción internally had some different ideological profiles, which were represented in the document written by the co-authors. The differences in ideologies are due to the wide support base it drew from. The MIR in Concepión utilized its grassroots approach by relying on a diverse group of organizations to make up its supporters. Students from the university would hold debates and often be open to hearing others opinions on issues that were at hand. The supporters in Concepción have been highlighted by historian Marian Schlotterbeck in her book Beyond the Vanguard: Every Day Revolutionaries in Allende’s Chile. In her book, she described the structure that was used to organize the sub-groups of the MIR, she said, "delegates would be drawn from the labor federation (CUT), unions, peasants councils, student federations, and pobladores' organizations," pointing towards the diversity of supporters that the movement was able to gather. The successes of this branch at the first People's Assembly was in part owed to the many different speakers from separate organizations and their ability to connect with and mobilize their own supporters. Several tendencies were represented on the Central Committee, but later, the only line that prevailed was the Marxist-Leninist. Both Maoists and Trotskyites abandoned MIR or were ousted by the new Secretariat led by Miguel Enriquez. The few anarchist and left liberal cadres supporting the "tendencia social-humanista" and that remained in the organization, were confined to academic tasks and trusted the ideological polemic with the emergent "Christian Humanism" and old Stalinists.

After the second congress in 1967, MIR considered itself not only a revolutionary vanguard party as established in the 1965 foundation congress, but also clearly advocated a Marxist-Leninist model of revolution in which it would lead the working class to a "dictatorship of the proletariat".

Yet in recent years, some scholars have cast doubt if the MIR was completely uniform ideologically across all its constituents. Dr. Marian Schlotterbeck in her book Beyond the Vanguard: Everyday Revolutionaries in Chile points out differences in party allegiances between national and regional MIR groups. For instance, the Concepción Peoples Assembly on July 27, 1972 saw the Concepción regional MIR directly collaborating with the Popular Unity coalition. The contemporaneous national MIR did not work with the Popular Unity, meaning that the regional party effectively created "a new political alliance that didn't exist at the national level." Moreover, Schlotterbeck also shows how events within the Concepción province attributed to the MIR organization were begun by grassroots actors on their own initiative rather than organized by the party itself, such as the conversion of the private bakery "El Progreso" into the communal bakery "El Pueblo." So, while national party members at Santiago nearly all believed in the Marxist-Leninist style of revolution, the on the ground reality in some cases was distinct with the working class leading the MIR into a socialist revolution rather than the other way around.

The Soviet Invasion of Czechoslovakia, 1968 was a divisive issue for the Chilean left. Whilst the Allende faction of the Socialist Party remained neutral, the far-left militants of this party opposed the Eastern bloc invasion, as did MIR.

In 1969, following the "Osses case", a direct (non-fatal) operation acted by four militants of MIR in Concepción against the right-wing tabloid Noticias de la Tarde, the Christian Democratic Party government used the incident to ban the MIR and begin persecution of its known leaders. The government publicized a national list of 13 young MIR leaders for their capture. Among them, all between 22 and 26 and with links to the University of Concepción, were Doctors Miguel Enríquez and Bautista van Schouwen, Professor Marcello Ferrada de Noli, medical student Luciano Cruz, sociologist Nelson Gutiérrez, lawyer Juan Saavedra Gorriategy, civil engineer Aníbal Matamala, and economist José Goñi (Goñi later became a Minister of Defense and ambassador of Chile in the USA). Some of them were captured after spectacular operatives coordinated by the central headquarters of the Chilean Political Police in Santiago, tortured, and imprisoned in the Cárcel of Concepción and in Santiago.

On 1 May 1969, fifteen armed MIR guerrillas stormed the Bío-Bío radio station of Concepción and transmitted a discourse urging the people to take up arms and overthrow the current government. On 21 May, a group of local MIR sympathizers took to the streets of Concepción and attacked the branches of 'The City Bank' in the city and the offices of the La Patria newspaper.

The banning of MIR by the Christian Democratic government in 1969 drastically changed the organization of MIR, which entered a clandestine political existence with semi-autonomous operative-structures that survived even during the first years of the military resistance of MIR against the 1973 Chilean coup. The threat from the MIR was underlined by the discovery at the end of May of a guerrilla training camp in the southern province of Valdivia. Beginning in March 1968, a series of MIR bomb attacks took place in various parts of the country that targeted, among others, the U.S. consulate, the Chilean-American Institute in Rancagua, the main office of the Christian Democratic Party, the office of Chile's largest-selling El Mercurio newspaper and the residence of senator Francisco Bulnes of the National Party.

In June 1971, a small group known as the Vanguardia Organizada del Pueblo (VOP), founded among others by two former MIR militants expelled from the Organization in 1969, conducted the abduction and murder of the former Minister of Interior Affairs during the Christian Democratic government, Edmundo Pérez Zujovic. The Minister had been singled out by sectors of the oppositional left and worker-unions as the top government politician supposedly ordering the repressive actions which culminated in the Masacre de Puerto Montt on 9 March 1969. At this massacre, nine working-class men and woman were killed by police in Southern Chile. Following the assassination of Perez Zijovic, the MIR Political Bureau condemned this action in "categorical" terms in a special issued communiqué.

MIR explicitly condemned terrorism perpetrated against individuals ("atentado personal"). Ideological issues that would help to explain this anti-terrorist posture of MIR have been referred in historical notes by MIR leaders who survived the epoch.

Although MIR built up an arsenals of light arms, assault automatic weapons, and also mobile mortar-launchers from its own handcrafted manufacturing (the Talleres), MIR supported rather than opposed the presidency of Salvador Allende and his People's Unity coalition. Nationwide unrest and political polarization escalated, as did left-wing and right-wing violence. Before 1973, the organization may have staged few attacks compared to its urban guerrilla peers, but it tried to infiltrate the Chilean Armed Forces in anticipation of a coup d'état against Allende and discussed plans to replace the existing police and military with a militia recruited from the Popular Front's supporters. The MIR commanders, Oscar Garretón and Miguel Enríquez, were tasked with infiltrating Chilean Navy personnel. In August 1973, it formed the Revolutionary Coordinating Junta (JCR) with other South American revolutionary parties (the Argentine ERP, the Uruguayan Tupamaros and the Bolivian National Liberation Army). However, the JCR never achieved real effectiveness.

== The day of the military coup ==
Fewer than 60 individuals died as a direct result of fighting on 11 September 1973, but the MIR and GAP continued to fight the following day. In all, 46 Allende's "praetorian guard" (the GAP, Grupo de Amigos Personales) were killed, some of them in combat with the soldiers that took the Moneda. Before the coup, Miguel Enríquez had convinced Allende to form a praetorian guard. Allende's praetorian guard under Cuban-trained commando Ariel Fontana should have had some 300 elite commando-trained GAP fighters defending the palace and nearby buildings in time for the military coup, but the use of brute military force, especially the use of Hawker Hunter bombers, Puma helicopter-gunships and the cordoning of Santiago, may have handicapped many GAP fighters from taking part in the action.

These factors may explain both the vigorous and brutal purges of armed forces personnel suspected of being sympathetic to Allende after Augusto Pinochet's 1973 coup d'état and the Operation Condor campaign of state terrorism staged throughout the Southern Cone.

During Pinochet's dictatorship, the group was responsible for several attacks on government personnel and buildings. In 1976, there had been plans to infiltrate 1,200 Marxist guerrillas from Argentina into Chile in an operation christened Plan Boomerang Rojo (Red Boomerang Plan), but the infiltration failed to materialize because of the co-operation of the Argentine authorities with Chile.

== The attempts to establish a guerrilla front ==
After the Chilean military takeover on 11 September 1973, the Chilean Army deployed the entire 4th Division under Major-General Héctor Bravo in Neltume, Valdivia, after 60-80 local left-wing militants attacked with molotov cocktails the local police station with the aim of capturing the armoury. Between 3 and 4 October 1973 Major-General Bravo ordered the execution of 11 MIR members and sympathizers: José Liendo, Fernando Krauss, René Barrientos, Pedro Barría, Luis Pezo, Santiago García, Víctor Saavedra, Sergio Bravo, Rudemir Saavedra, Enrique Guzmán, Víctor Rudolph, Luis Valenzuela Krauss-Barrientos. On 23 October 1973, 23-year-old Army Corporal Benjamín Alfredo Jaramillo Ruz, who was serving with the 2nd Cazadores Infantry Regiment, became the first fatal casualty of the counterinsurgency operations in the mountainous area of Alquihue in Valdivia after being shot by a guerrilla sniper. The years 1980–81 saw the MIR return in strength to the Valdivia province where they sought to establish a guerrilla group in Neltume. The MIR had in September 1970 given basic military training to some 2,000 lumber workers in the Panguipulli Lake area and won over the trust of the general population, some 500 miles south of Santiago. In the renewed military offensives in the area, MIR guerrillas around Lake Panguipulli, with the help of local militants and sympathizers, halted the initial advance of the Chilean Army. Later, in order to disperse them and subdue the province, the Chilean Army ordered a full Brigade of elite troops in the form of Special Forces and Paratroopers and their accompanying U.S. military advisors. In the various military operations carried out in the cities of Talcahuano, Concepcion, Los Angeles and Valdivia between 23 and 24 August 1984, the military and police forces deployed executed six captured MIR militants and sympathizers.

On 15 July 1980, MIR guerrillas killed 43-year-old Lieutenant-Colonel Roger Vergara Campos, head of the Chilean Army Intelligence School, also shooting his driver, 42-year-old Sergeant Mario Espinoza Navarro. On 30 August 1983, MIR guerrillas assassinated 57-year-old Major-General Carol Urzúa Ibáñez, military governor of Santiago and his armed escorts, 30-year-old corporal Carlos Rivero Bequiarelli and 34-year-old Corporal José Domingo Aguayo-Franco. During October and November 1983, the MIR bombed four offices of U.S. affiliated corporations. In June 1988, the MIR bombed four banks in Santiago, causing serious structural damage. According to the Rettig Report, MIR leader Jecar Neghme was assassinated in 1989 by Chilean state agents.

According to MIR commander Andrés Pascal Allende, in all some 1,500-2,000 MIR members were killed or forcefully disappeared under the Chilean military regime. After Chile's return to democracy in 1990, the party was resurrected. It currently participates in the Juntos Podemos Más coalition.

== The MIR and the case against Pinochet ==
Relatives and friends of the MIR members assassinated by the Pinochet regime filed a civil lawsuit before judge Juan Guzmán Tapia against Pinochet. The criminal complaint states that the MIR had been formed in 1965 and that due to ideological and tactical differences did not become part of the Popular Unity government headed by Salvador Allende. Still, the organisation had served as a base of support for Allende and had shown willingness to confront violent sedition directed against the Popular Unity government organized by its US-backed right-wing opponents.

Subsequently, with the 11 September 1973 Chilean coup and the overthrow and death of Allende Chile entered a period of severe military repression in which members of the former Allende government and its supporters were deemed enemies of the state. From the onset on 11 September 1973 the MIR became a major focus of death squads and its members began to be subjected to extrajudicial executions and forced disappearances.

As a consequence, the MIR initiated a resistance against the military junta's violent repression that accompanied the clandestine publication of the document Qué es el MIR? (What is the MIR?) which proposed a series of resolutions to confront the repression, including political pressure, denunciations and propaganda. On one page (page 37 of the political document), the MIR presented the political question of arms in this resistance.

The lawsuit noted that the armed struggle was not central to the ideology of the MIR and that it had historically been a political organisation whose strategy had principally involved the mobilization of working class people and the poor in an attempt to exert political pressure to effectuate political and social change to advance their political cause.

The lawsuit noted that under the pretext of war serious violations of human rights had been committed in violations of both international and constitutional law. The document noted that the cruellest example was the extermination of the MIR political organization, in which according to the document its members fell victims to the following crimes:

- Homicide (first degree murder)
- Killings in mock confrontations – irrational use of force (such as mobilizing 300 security agents to arrest 4 people.)
- False application of the 'law of flight' (executing people for escaping after being informally freed.)
- Mass killings (state terrorism)
- Abduction and Forced disappearances (sanctioned by article 141 of the Criminal Code)
- Torture (violation of the Geneva convention)
- Illicit associations (in accordance with Article 292 of the Criminal Code)
- Genocide (in accordance with Article 2 of CPPCG)

== Notable members ==
- Miguel Enríquez, physician, MIR leader, died in a gunfight with the police.
- Abrahan Valenzuela Rivera, General Secretary, killed in a gunfight after he made a failed attempt to assassinate 2 police officers.
- Andrés Pascal Allende, MIR Secretario general MIR after death of Miguel Enríquez.
- Luciano Cruz, medical student, co-founder of MIR, principal leader of university students movement. Cause of death in 1971 remains unresolved.
- Bautista van Schouwen, physician, MIR leader, co-founder, executed December 1973.
- Marcello Ferrada de Noli, co-founder of MIR, head MIR's University Brigade in Concepción. Prisoner in Quiriquina Island ensuing 1973 Chilean coup d'état.
- Jorge Fuentes Alarcón, co-founder of MIR, jefe Regional MIR en Norte de Chile, died under torture 1974.
- Luis Fuentes Labarca, founder of "El Rebelde"
- Jorge Müller Silva, cinematographer, forced disappearance.
- Jecar Antonio Nehme Cristi, political leader, assassinated.
- Diana Arón, journalist, forced disappearance.
- Cedomil Lausic Glasinovic, agronomist, executed.
- José Appel De La Cruz, medical student, forced disappearance.
- William Beausire, stockbroker, forced disappearance.
- José Gregorio Liendo, leader of MIR group in Neltume, executed by firing squad.
- Gustavo Marín, leader of MIR group in the Mapuche zone (southern Chile), imprisoned then forced into exile.
- Gabriel Salazar, historian, left the movement in 1973.
- Clotario Blest, union leader, left the movement in 1967.
- Svante Grände, Swedish aid worker, fled Chile and joined the ERP in Argentina, killed by military in 1975.

== See also ==
- Miguel Enríquez
- Manuel Rodríguez Patriotic Front
