= Darío Paya =

Chilean politician (born 1964)

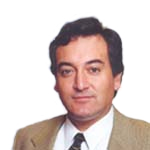

Ambassador of Chile at the Organization of American States
- In office 17 March 2010 – 11 March 2014
- President: Sebastián Piñera
- Preceded by: Adolfo Carafí
- Succeeded by: Juan Lira Bianchi

Secretary General of the Independent Democratic Union
- In office 1 July 2006 – 5 July 2008
- Preceded by: Juan Antonio Coloma Correa
- Succeeded by: Víctor Pérez Varela

Member of the Chamber of Deputies
- In office 11 March 1994 – 11 March 2010
- Preceded by: Mario Palestro
- Succeeded by: Pedro Browne
- Constituency: 28th District

Personal details
- Born: 20 July 1964 (age 62) Santiago, Chile
- Party: Independent Democratic Union (UDI)
- Spouse: Bettina Horst
- Children: Four
- Parent(s): Rubén Paya; Elizabeth Mira
- Education: Pontifical Catholic University of Chile (LL.B)
- Occupation: Politician
- Profession: Lawyer

Darío Guillermo Paya Mira (born 20 July 1964) is a Chilean lawyer and politician. He served as a deputy in the Chamber of Deputies of Chile for four consecutive terms from 1994 to 2010, representing the 28th District. He subsequently served as Ambassador of Chile to the Organization of American States (OAS) under the first government of Sebastián Piñera. A longtime member of the Independent Democratic Union (UDI), he served as the party's secretary general from 2006 to 2008.

== Early life ==
Paya was born Darío Guillermo Payacán Mira on 20 July 1964 in Santiago, Chile. He is of Mapuche descent, and later shortened his paternal surname from Payacán to Paya. He is the son of Rubén Darío Paya Vega and Elizabeth Elena Mira Mellado.

== Education ==
Paya completed his primary education at Subercaseaux College in San Miguel, Santiago, and his secondary education at Instituto Miguel León Prado in the same district. He later traveled to the United States as an exchange student through the American Field Service (AFS) scholarship program and graduated from Loch Raven Senior High School in Baltimore in 1982.

In 1983, he entered the Faculty of Law at the Pontifical Catholic University of Chile, where he obtained his law degree in 1992. During his university years, he served as a teaching assistant to professor and later assassinated senator Jaime Guzmán. He was sworn in as an attorney before the Supreme Court of Chile on 21 December 1992. After qualifying as a lawyer, he undertook specialization courses in Japan, Spain, and the United States.

== Career ==
=== Legal and research career ===
Professionally, Paya worked as a research attorney at the Libertad y Desarrollo Institute and provided advisory services to members of Congress. In 1992, he worked at the Leadership Institute in the United States, initiating a collaboration with that organization that eventually led to the establishment of the Leadership Institute Chile. Since 2014, he has served as president of the Fundación Leadership Institute Chile (FLI).

=== Political career ===
Paya began his political career as president of the Student Center of the School of Law at his university in 1985. He was a candidate for the presidency of the FEUC (student federation) in 1986. A member of the UDI since 1983, he served as president of the party's youth wing from 1992 to 1994. Following the assassination of Senator Jaime Guzmán in 1991, Paya was re-elected president of the UDI youth wing, a position he held until 11 March 1994, when he assumed his seat in Congress.

==== Chamber of Deputies ====
In the 1993 parliamentary elections, Paya was elected as a deputy for District No. 28 (Lo Espejo, Pedro Aguirre Cerda, and San Miguel) in the Santiago Metropolitan Region for the 1994–1998 term, defeating Mario Palestro, an emblematic figure of the Chilean left. At twenty-nine years of age, he was one of the youngest members elected to Congress in those elections. He obtained 41,029 votes (22.41%).

During the XLIX Legislative Period (1994–1998), he participated in the standing committees on Internal Government, Regionalization, Planning and Social Development, and on Human Rights, Nationality and Citizenship. In December 1997, he was re-elected for the 1998–2002 term with 34,325 votes (22.90%), and served on the Standing Committee on Labor and Social Security.

In the December 2001 elections, he retained his seat for the 2002–2006 term, obtaining the highest vote share in the district with 47,756 votes (32.23%). During this period, he served on the Special Committee on Public Safety and the standing committees on Constitution, Legislation and Justice, and on Science and Technology, of which he was chairman. In December 2005, he secured a fourth re-election for the 2006–2010 term with 31,691 votes (20.85%), serving on the standing committees on Economy and on Science and Technology.

In the 2009 parliamentary elections, he chose not to seek re-election, calling instead for generational renewal among the party's leadership.

==== Secretary General of the UDI ====
From 2006 to 2008, he served as secretary general of the National Board of the UDI, under the presidency of Senator Hernán Larraín.

==== Ambassador to the OAS ====
In February 2010, President-elect Sebastián Piñera designated him as director of the Government's Secretariat of Communications (Secom), a position he declined. In March 2010, he was appointed Ambassador of Chile to the Organization of American States (OAS), serving until the end of the administration in 2014.

==== Later political activity ====
In August 2017, his resignation from the UDI was made public, ending more than 34 years of party membership, citing differences with party members.

In April 2020, he was appointed by President Sebastián Piñera as a member of the Foreign Policy Council of the Ministry of Foreign Affairs.

== Personal life ==
Paya married economist Bettina Horst in 1994 and is the father of four children.
