= Neltume =

Coordinates: 39°48′S 71°57′W

- Town
- Interactive map of Neltume
- Region: Los Ríos
- Province: Valdivia
- Municipalidad: Panguipulli
- Comuna: Panguipulli

Government
  - Type: Municipalidad
  - Alcade: René Aravena Riffo (RN)

Population (2002 census )
  - Total: 2,125
- Time zone: UTC−04:00 (Chilean Standard)
  - Summer (DST): UTC−03:00 (Chilean Daylight)
- Area code: Country + town = 56 + 63

Neltume is a Chilean town in Panguipulli commune, of Los Ríos Region. It lies along the 203-CH route to Huahum Pass into Argentina. The town's main economic activities are forestry and, more recently, tourism since the Huilo-Huilo Biological Reserve was created in 1999. During large periods of the 20th century, Neltume was a site of social mobilizations and unrest, events which culminated in 1981 with the crackdown of the "Toqui Lautaro" guerrilla set of by MIR to fight the military dictatorship in Chile.

== History ==
=== Settlement and founding of Neltume (1898–1944) ===
The area of Neltume was colonized in the first decades of the 20th century as part of the economic boom that the wood industry was experiencing in Chile at that time. The humid and forested areas of Neltume had not had any recorded human occupation until those years as native Mapuches lived rather on the lake shores of Calafquén, Panguipulli and Riñihue Lakes and visited sporadically the eastern parts of these lakes for gathering food. In 1885 Panguipulli became settled by the first non-indigenous persons and in 1898 a small forestry enterprise was installed in Neltume. In 1942, an engineered wood plant is installed in Neltume. Before the gravel road to Neltume built the town relied on steam boat transport across Panguipulli Lake.

=== Social unrest (1945–1973) ===
Neltume got its first police station in 1945 when one of the fundos (country estates) that were part of the Echavarri y Bravo company became subject of unrest and mobilization for social demands among lumberjacks and campesinos. The campesinos were strongly repressed by authorities and some 20 families were expelled from the zone. In 1951 there was another strike among sawmill and forestry workers, who tried to form a trade union and demanded higher salaries, as consequence about 40 leaders and their families were driven out of Neltume. Witnesses from this period record people being taken to Valdivia by Carabineros and estimates the duration of the strike in three months. The same witness states that Carabineros were asked by the sawmill boss to gun any striker found walking around in nighttime. The repression of this movement was according to historians Pino and Jelin so strong that only in the 1960s and during the Unidad Popular government did the workers managed form trade unions in the zone.

In 1971 after several land occupations informally known as Operación ardillas (Spanish for Operation Squirrels) the Unidad Popular government expropriated the fundo Carranes from the Sociaded Agrícola y Maderera de Neltme creating the Complejo Maderero Panguipulli merging with it other expropriated lands reaching an area of 360.000 ha of wooded terrain. Property in Liquiñe and Chihuío, localities outside the proper Neltume area, were also placed under the Complejo Maderero Panguipulli. In 1972 president Salvador Allende visited Neltume.

On September 2, 1973, 9 days before the 1973 Chilean coup d'etat conservative newspaper El Mercurio wrote that the Chilean Air Force had found strangers in a "zone called Neltume" which the newspaper imprecisely described as lying east of Puerto Saavedra and south of Cautín River. El Mercurio also stated that the case was very similar to what happened in Bolivia comparing it with Che Guevara's camp in Mancahuazú, and said that local Mapuches had denounced their [the leftists] presence after they became subjects of unjust demands on behalf of the left-wing militants.

=== Assault on carabineros station (1973) ===
After hearing the news about the 11 September coup MRC (Spanish acronym for Revolutionary Campesino Movement), a group formed with help of MIR, decided to take actions against the police station in Neltume as a first step to defend the Unidad Popular government. The idea of the MRC was to take control of the building, have the police to surrender, making them join the revolt and seize any weapons to be found there. People from MCR gathered all weapons they could find, four rifles and some shotguns, and prepared dozens of molotov cocktails and home-made grenades. The assault was launched at 02.00 in the night, September 12. The attackers were between 60 and 80 men.

Jorge Durán Delgado, a former MIR militant that was 19 years old when he participated in the assault on the police station, remembers these moments: "Pepe shouted at them to surrender, to not fear for the lives. To [surrender and] fight together with us to defend to government of Allende" Benito Carrasco Riffo, by then commandant of the police station, said that they shouted back: "We don't surrender, carabineros does not surrender mierda!"

The four carabineros inside the police station had two SIG automatic rifles and two carabines with which they answered the fire from the MRC. The police station was a rustic wooden building, but was enough to resist the weak firepower of the assailants, and rain prevented the Molotov cocktails to put the structure on fire. Inside the police station were also the wives and children of the carabineros. Corporal Juan Campos in the police station asked for help to the police station in Choshuenco some 20 km west and shouted desperately though the radio: "Send the aerial cavalry!"

At around 03.00 a reinforcement of four carabineros arrived on a pickup truck. These reinforcements erroneously fired at carabineros at first, and by the time they had arrived, the attack was almost over and the MCR people had retired.

==== Aftermath ====
There were no deaths in the assault and the police station did not suffer mayor damage. The police attempted to identify the weapons used but the investigation could not find any of the bullets fired against the station. In October 1973, 12 people were executed in Valdivia for these actions and "guerrilla activities" in Neltume. On November 3, 1973 three young men were condemned in a court martial to death for their participation in the assault. In 1990 General Bravo qualified the execution of the three men as "terrible" as there had not been any proof of their participation in the assault. In the days around September 18, Chile's national day, of 1973 paratroop commandos under Alejandro Medina Lois searched through the Neltume zone in search for the leader of MCR, Comandante Pepe, who was captured and some days later executed by the Caravan of Death.

During the 1973 events in Neltume villager Luís Ancapi is reported to have survived a death flight by falling into a "mattress" of Chusquea quila.

=== Guerrilla (1980–1981) ===
During the military dictatorship in Chile the Revolutionary Left Movement (MIR in Spanish) drew up plans for a popular guerrilla war in southern Chile. They sought to create a focus of resistance inspired by the Fidel Castro's 26th of July Movement in the Sierra Maestra. The area of Neltume was chosen due to the presence of an indigenous Mapuche population and "a large and explosive rural proletariat" among the sawmill workers of Neltume. It was also considered convenient that the place was close to the cities of Valdivia, Temuco and Osorno.

On 12 July 1980, the MIR sent the first unit of its newly formed guerrilla group "Destacamento Toqui Lautaro" into the mountainous area around Neltume. Most of the guerrillas had been detained in 1973 following the 1973 Chilean coup d'état and had to enter illegally into Chile from their exile countries aboard. The foco was discovered by the authorities in July 1981 when it had been active for less than one year. The Chilean army succeeded in isolating the group by August 1981 and in October of the same year its last members were captured. Three guerrillas are claimed to have been captured, tortured, and executed. Another six died in combat and during ambushes. Two more were captured in neighboring areas in Argentina, and were transferred to Chile in accordance with Operation Condor.

=== Selling of state property (1987–1990) ===
During the last years of the Pinochet dictatorship, between 1987 and 1990, large portions of land that were formerly part of the Complejo Forestal y Maderero Panguipulli were sold under obscure circumstances to Chilean billionaires, among them Andrónico Luksic, whose family now owns Fundo Chanchan and Fundo Enco along Enco River and other properties around Neltume. Another wealthy businessman, Víctor Petermann, took control of Fundo Huilo-Huilo in the 1990s and established the luxurious Huilo-Huilo Biological Reserve dedicated to both ecotourism and preservation of biodiversity.

== See also ==
- List of towns in Chile
