= Sociedad Química y Minera =

Chilean chemical company and lithium producer

Sociedad Química y Minera de Chile S.A
- Type: Sociedad Anónima
- Traded as: BCS: SQM-A; BCS: SQM-B; S&P Latin America 40 component
- ISIN: US8336351056(ADR)
- Industry: Chemicals and mining
- Founded: June 11, 1968; 58 years ago
- Headquarters: Santiago, Chile
- Key people: Ricardo Ramos (CEO); Julio Ponce Lerou
- Products: Industrial chemical; Iodine; Lithium; Potassium; Specialty plant nutrition
- Revenue: ▲US$2.86 billion (2021)
- Operating income: ▲US$927 million (2021)
- Net income: ▲US$592 million (2021)
- Total assets: ▲US$7.04 billion (2021)
- Total equity: ▲US$3.22 billion (2021)
- Number of employees: 8,344
- Website: www.sqm.com

Sociedad Química y Minera de Chile (SQM) is a Chilean chemical company and a supplier of plant nutrients, iodine, lithium and industrial chemicals. By 2017, it was the world's biggest lithium producer. Following the launch of Chile's National Lithium Strategy in 2023, SQM's lithium mining activities were transferred to the newly established Nova Andino Litio – a public–private joint venture with Codelco.

SQM's natural resources and its main production facilities are located in the Atacama Desert in Tarapacá and Antofagasta regions.

In December 2024, the company reported to have 8,344 employees, up from 6,081 in December 2021. About 22% of SQM's employees are women.

== History ==
=== State company (1968–1983) ===
The company was created in 1968 as a Sociedad Minera Mixta between private investors and the State of Chile (Compañía Salitrera Anglo-Lautaro 62.5% and CORFO 37.5%). The new company was made up of the combination of the deposits and assets of the Compañía Salitrera Anglo-Lautaro and the Empresa Salitrera Victoria owned by CORFO.

At the end of 1966, the problem of the expiration of the state enterprise managed by COVENSA July 30, 1968, and how to organize the nitrate industry arose. Negotiations with Anglo-Lautaro to establish a partnership led to the creation of SQM, with the intent to restructure the declining nitrate production, increase investment and improve exploitation. As a result, SQM was given a monopoly in the exploitation and commercialization of nitrate.

In 1971, the State of Chile, through CORFO, acquired 100% of the property and with this, the exploitation of nitrate was nationalized.

=== Private company (1983–) ===
Between 1983 and 1988, it was privatized again during the military dictatorship, transferring the Chilean state company to Julio Ponce Lerou, the then son-in-law of Augusto Pinochet, for 20,300 million pesos through the transfer of 93% of the State shares despite the fact that the value was approximately 35,800 million pesos.

In 1993, the operations of the technical grade potassium nitrate plant began.

In 1995, SQM was listed on the New York Stock Exchange and started the production of potassium chloride from the Salar de Atacama. Production of lithium carbonate from the Salar del Carmen started in 1997. In the years that followed, the business was internationalized through acquisitions and joint ventures:

- acquisition of Kemira Emirates Fertilizer Company (2005),
- takeover of the iodine business of DSM (2006),
- Joint Ventures with Coromandel in India (2009),
- Qingdao Star in China (2009),
- Roullier in France (2009) all for the plant nutrition business,
- Lithium-Americas Corp. in Canada (2016) to run the Cauchari-Olaroz lithium project in Jujuy, Argentina. In 2018, sold its share to Ganfeng Lithium
- Kidman Resources in Australia (2017) to form Covalent Lithium to manage the mount Holland mine project. Kidman Resources was subsequently taken over by Wesfarmers.

In 2015, the largest shareholder with 32% was the Julio Ponce Lerou's Pampa Group.

In 2015, after flood damage to the railway, nitrate transport to the port by rail was replaced by trucking.

In 2018, China's Tianqi Lithium Corp. purchased 23.77% stake in SQM from Canadian mining company Nutrien Ltd. In 2019, Tianqi Lithium came to an agreement over the governance of SQM with key shareholder Julio Ponce Lerou.

In October 2023, SQM acquired a 30% stake in Australia's Pirra Lithium.

== Products ==
=== Specialty plant nutrition ===
This product range is based mostly on formulated potassium nitrate. In 2019 its revenue was $724mio.

=== Lithium ===
In the Salar de Atacama in the Atacama Desert of Northern Chile, SQM produces lithium carbonate and hydroxide from brine. As of 2020, SQM reported a capacity of 70kt of lithium carbonate with plans to expand to 150kt/y by 2020. There is some capacity to convert the carbonate to lithium hydroxide in Salar de Carmen. 2019 revenues from lithium were $505mio. In 2021, the lithium revenues were US$936.1 million.

The process involves pumping up lithium rich brine from below the ground into shallow pans. Water is evaporated thanks to the strong sun and dry air. The brine contains many different dissolved ions, and as the concentration increases, salts precipitate out of solution and sink. The remaining liquid (the supernatant) is used for the next step. In the first pan, halite (sodium chloride or common salt) crystallises. This has insufficient economic value and is discarded. The supernatant, with ever increasing concentration of dissolved solids, is transferred successively to the Sylvinite (sodium potassium chloride) pond, the Carnalite (potassium magnesium chloride) pond and finally a pond designed to maximise the concentration of lithium chloride. The process takes about 15 months. The concentrate (30–35% lithium chloride solution) is trucked to Salar del Carmen. There, boron and magnesium are removed before, by addition of sodium carbonate, the desired lithium carbonate is precipitated out. SQM sells potassium chloride made from Sylvinite and potassium nitrate derived from the Carnalite.

There is considerable focus on the use of water in this water poor region. SQM commissioned a life-cycle analysis which concluded that water consumption for SQM's lithium hydroxide and carbonate is significantly lower than that of the average for production from the main ore-based process, using spodumene, and in to environmental report claims that environmental KPIs such as animal populations are not affected by extraction. According to Volkswagen, there is an unresolved dispute about whether brine extraction causes an influx of fresh water and thus influences the groundwater at the edge of the salt flats. Copper mining, tourism, agriculture also consume significant water and climate change cannot be dismissed.

=== Iodine ===
In 1995, Ajay Chemicals formed a joint venture with SQM, holder of the world's largest known iodine reserves. Partnering with Ajay, the AJAY-SQM GROUP added Ajay-SQM Chile SA. This vertical integration with Ajay made SQM-Ajay the world's largest producer of iodine derivatives. Through the 2006 acquisition of DSM Minera's iodine derivatives plant in northern Chile in 2006, Ajay-SQM Group added a fourth manufacturing site. The main application is X-ray contrast media. In 2019, its revenue was $371mio.

=== Potassium ===
SQM sells three potassium compounds, potassium chloride, nitrate and sulfate for a total revenue of $213mio in 2019. The chloride is obtained as a by-product from lithium production and sold for oil drilling, while the nitrate is made by combining sodium nitrate extracted from caliche and evaporation. It is sold as a fertiliser or a component of the heat transfer fluid in solar thermal power stations. SQM processes potassium nitrate at the Coya Sur plant in María Elena at 1,200 m altitude, and drives it 80 km to the port in Tocopilla, including in an electric truck.

=== Industrial chemicals ===
- Sodium Nitrate, from leaching caliche. This is the historical business on which the company's ancestors were built. Major applications include glass, ceramic, explosives and metal treatments.

The other products in the is category are obtained directly or by a simple conversion from the evaporites obtained in the concentration of brine for lithium production

- Potassium nitrate, from sodium nitrate (from caliche) and potassium chloride from lithium production. Major applications include crystal glass, enamels, metal treatment and gunpowder.
- Potassium sulfate comes from the Salar de Atacama brines. The major application is in the manufacture of drywall panels.
- Potassium Chloride also from lithium production. The major application is as a stabilizer for oil drilling.
- Sylvinite is another by product of brine concentration in the Salar de Atacama, in which sodium and potassium chloride cocrystallize. The major application is a low-sodium substitute for salt in the food industry.
- Bischofite (Magnesium Chloride Hexahydrate) major applications include stabilizer, dust control and de-icing agent on roads.
- Salt (Sodium Chloride) also known as halite.
- Solar Salts: 60% sodium nitrate and 40% potassium nitrate used for energy storage in solar thermal power stations

Total 2019 revenue for these products was $95mio.

== Controversies ==
People associated with former senior managers in the company were in 2016 and 2017 investigated by the Chilean national police in relation to allegations of tax evasion and bribery. This investigation was referred to by La Nación, a major Chilean newspaper, as "the SQM Affair".

On January 13, 2017, as part of an investigation by the U.S. Securities and Exchange Commission into violations of the Foreign Corrupt Practices Act, SQM agreed to pay a $30 million penalty to resolve parallel civil and criminal cases. According to the investigation, the company made $15 million in improper payments to Chilean political figures and others connected to them in a seven-year period.
