= Penta case =

Chilean criminal case

The Penta case (or Penta-SQM, since the two cases are related) is a criminal case brought against Grupo Penta (or Empresas Penta), a Chilean holding company, and employees of the Chilean National Tax System (SII). Key employees of the firm have been convicted of committing tax fraud by creating fake invoices in the National Tax System (SII). These funds were then directed to the political campaigns of mainly UDI (far right wing) politicians as campaign contributions. Several Penta employees, as some of their family members, have been convicted of tax evasion, bribery, and money laundering. Both directors of Penta Bank, Carlos Alberto Délano and Carlos Eugenio Lavín, were penalized with paying a fine, spending a few days in a special prison for economic crimes, and attending mandatory ethics classes.

Update 2 December 2015: The former president of the UDI political party Jovino Novoa is sentenced to 3 years parole (pena remitida) for tax crimes.

Here are the defendants from Penta:

Name	position	sentence
Hugo Bravo	general manager	was charged in March for money laundering, bribery, and tax fraud. He is currently under house arrest
Carlos Alberto Délano	director	charged 7 March 2015 with tax fraud and bribery. Was held and then released.
Carlos Eugenio Lavín	director	Spent his 73rd birthday in prison.
Oscar Buzeta	business development manager	charged with tax crimes

Here are the defendants from the SII:

Name	position	sentence
Ivan Alvarez	auditor	On March 25, 2015, the court found Ivan guilty and in the holding sentenced him to 5 years of imprisonment; fine in the amount of 1,900 million pesos; and confiscation of an apartment and a car
Sergio Diaz	accountant	4 years imprisonment; 700 million fine; forfeiture of two houses and an apartment.
Juan Carlos Prieto	accountant	5 years of probation, 290 million fine
Mitzi Carrasco	accountant	5 years of probation, 246 million fine
Hernan Diaz	accountant	released
Francisco Sivic	accountant	released
Horacio Mayquel	accountant	released
Orlando Carvajal	accountant	5 years of probation, $30 million fine

Here are some of the politicians to whom Penta funneled funds.

Name	party	status
Pablo Zalaquett	UDI, former mayor of Santiago	released from house arrest
Iván Morerira	senator (UDI)	no charges

Others charged:

Name	role	status
Pablo Wagner	mining subsecretary under President Piñera	under house arrest
