= Valdivia (disambiguation) =

Valdivia is a city and commune in the province of Valdivia, Chile.

Valdivia may also refer to:

== Places ==
=== Chile ===
- Valdivia River, a river which begins in the city of Valdivia
- Valdivia Province, the province of Valdivia
- Valdivian Coastal Range, part of the bigger Chilean Coastal Range
- Valdivian Coastal Reserve, a natural reserve south of the city of Valdivia
- Valdivia National Reserve, a natural reserve south of the city of Valdivia
- Roman Catholic Diocese of Valdivia
- Lo Valdivia, a minor town in O'Higgins Region
- Valdivia Volcano, an old name for Mocho-Choshuenco
- Valdivia Lake, an old name for Llanquihue Lake
- Valdivia fracture zone, a geological fracture zone in Nazca plate

=== Colombia ===
- Valdivia, Antioquia, a municipality in Antioquia Department, Colombia
- Valdivia Department, former department in Antioquia State

=== Ecuador ===
- Valdivia, Ecuador, a minor town in Guayas Province

=== Spain ===
- Valdivia, Badajoz, a minor town near Badajoz in Extremadura

=== The Sub-Antarctic ===
- Cape Valdivia, on Bouvetøya

=== Antarctica ===
- Valdivia Point

=== Red Sea ===
- Valdivia Deep

== Culture ==
=== Ecuador ===
- Valdivia culture

=== Chile ===
- Valdivia International Film Festival
- Deportes Valdivia

== People ==
- Pedro de Valdivia (1497–1553), first royal governor of Chile and founder of several cities in the country, including that bearing his name
- Jorge Valdivia (born 1983), Chilean football player currently playing for Colo-Colo
- Juan de Valdivia (floruit 1510s), Spanish conquistador
- Pierrick Valdivia (born 1988), French football player, former of Olympique Lyonnais, currently playing for Guingamp
- Luis de Valdivia (1560–1642), Spanish jesuit that advocated for a defensive war during the Arauco War
- Javier Valdivia (born 1941), former Mexican footballer
- Jose Valdivia, Jr. (born 1974), Peruvian jockey
- Noelle Valdivia, American playwright
- Julio César Valdivia (born 1982), Mexican football goalkeeper
- Alberto Valdivia Baselli (born 1977), Peruvian poet
- Rey Alejandro Conde Valdivia, Mexican conductor
- Juan Valdivia (born 1965), guitarist in Spanish rock band Héroes del Silencio
- Wanderson Ferreira de Oliveira known as Valdívia (born 1994), Brazilian footballer
- Felipe Valdívia (born 2000), full name Felipe Sambudio Rosalen, Brazilian footballer

== Other uses ==
- Valdivian temperate rain forests, a temperate broad-leaf and mixed forest ecoregion located on the west coast of southern South America
- Valdivia, the name for the Eemian interglacial period, around 130,000–114,000 years ago, in Chile
- Valdivian Fort System, colonial fortifications made to protect the city of Valdivia (The key of the South seas, Gibraltar of the Pacific)
- Valdivia (plant), a genus in the family Escalloniaceae
- Valdivia (crab), a genus in the family Trichodactylidae
- Valdivia (moth), a former genus in the family Pyralidae
- Flag of Valdivia, the flag of the city of Valdivia
- Capture of Valdivia, a battle in the Chilean War of Independence
- Pedro de Valdivia Avenue, a street in Santiago, Chile
- Pedro de Valdivia metro station
- Pedro de Valdivia Bridge, a bridge in Valdivia, Chile
- 2741 Valdivia, an asteroid
- Chilean landing ship Valdivia (LST-93), a landing ship tank vessel acquired from the United States in 1995 and decommissioned in 2011
- Valdivia Expedition, German Deep Sea Expedition of 1898–99
