= Río Cruces Bridge =

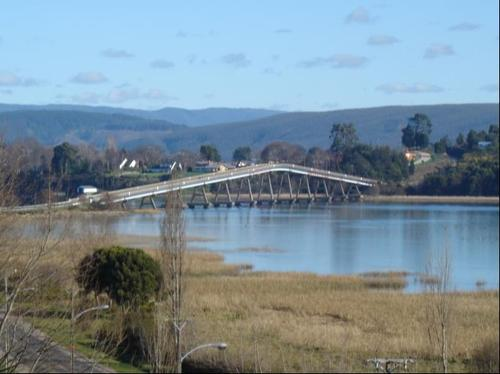
- View of Río Cruces Bridge from Isla Teja
- Coordinates: 39.8255°S 73.2655°W
- Crosses: Cruces River
- Locale: Valdivia, Chile
- Official name: Puente Río Cruces
- Maintained by: Valdivia municipality

History
- Opened: 1987

Location
- Interactive map of Río Cruces Bridge

Río Cruces Bridge is a triangular bridge spanning Cruces River that unites Isla Teja from Torobayo, a sub-urban area of Valdivia. Together with Pedro de Valdivia Bridge (built in 1954) it allows connection from Valdivia to the coastal town Niebla. Before the opening of Río Cruces Bridge the main access to Niebla was via a ferry from La Mulatas to Torobayo. Other areas that benefited from the bridge were Punucapa and Curiñanco.

It was built from December 1984 to February 1987.
