= Anwandter =

Anwandter is a surname. Notable people with the surname include:

- Álex Anwandter (born 1983), Chilean singer-songwriter, musician, and film and music video director
- Andrés Anwandter (born 1974), Chilean poet
- Carlos Anwandter (1801–1889), German political exile in Chile
  - Instituto Alemán Carlos Anwandter
