= Curiñanco =

- village
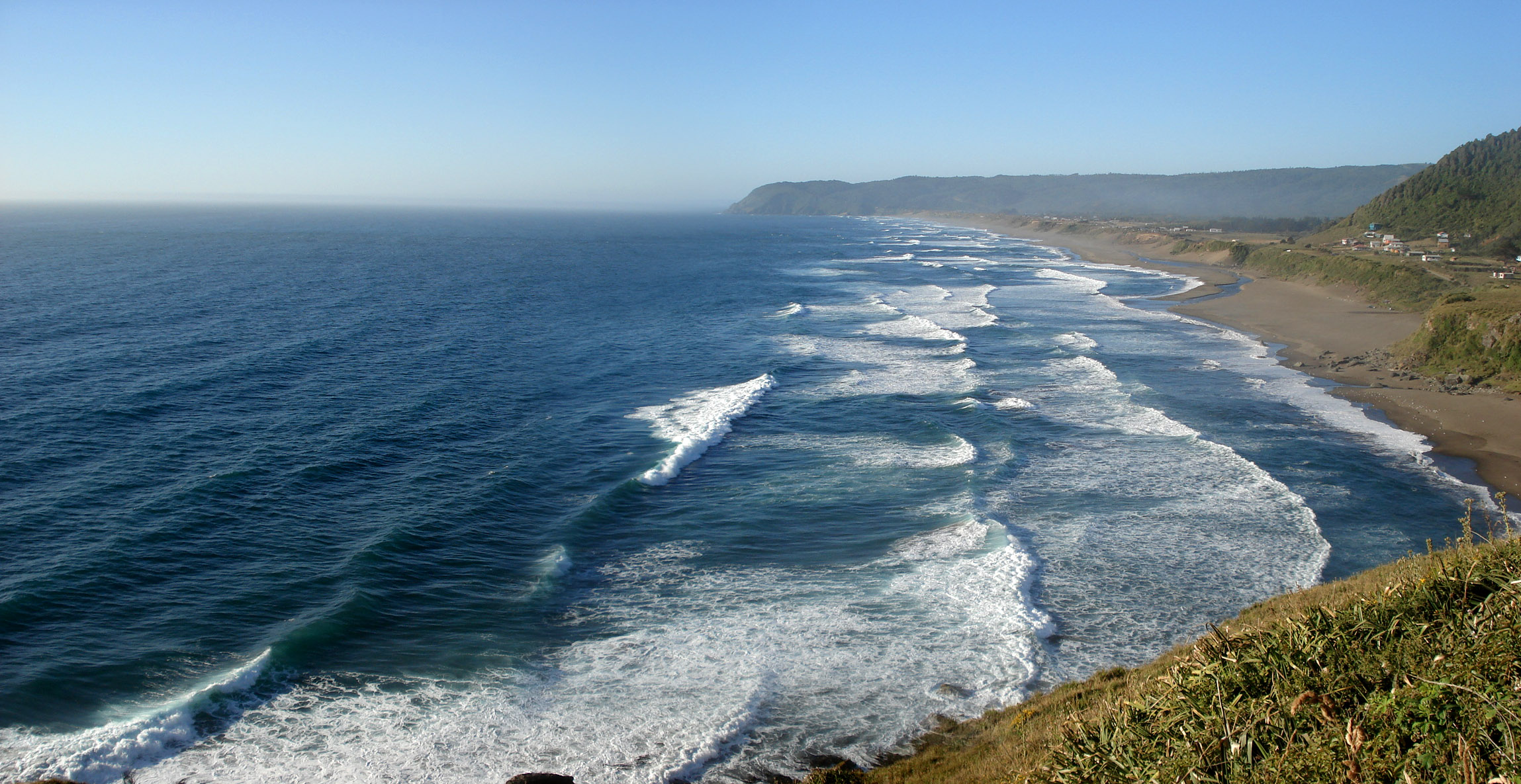
- Curiñanco’s beach during the summer, viewed from its southern access. The promontory that can be seen in the background is part of the Punta Curiñanco Protected Coastal Area.
- Interactive map of Curiñanco
- Region: Los Ríos
- Province: Valdivia
- Municipalidad: Valdivia
- Comuna: Valdivia

Government
  - Type: Municipalidad
  - Alcade: Carla Amtmann

Population (2002 census )
  - Total: 274
- Time zone: UTC−04:00 (Chilean Standard)
  - Summer (DST): UTC−03:00 (Chilean Daylight)
- Area code: Country + town = 56 + 43

Curiñanco is a coastal village in the Los Ríos Region of Chile belonging to the comuna of Valdivia. It is located on the stretch of coast between the estuary of the Valdivia River and that of the Lingue River. It has a current population of 274 inhabitants according to the 2002 census. Curiñanco can be reached from the south by an asphalt and gravel road originating in the town of Niebla, and from the southeast by another road, primarily gravel, that originates in Torobayo and passes near to Punucapa en route to the coast. Curiñanco takes its name from the cacique Curiñancu, father of the Mapuche leader Lautaro.

== Sports ==
The village has an amateur football club known as the Curiñanco Sports Club, which was founded December 8, 1918. The club participates in the Niebla Sports League along with other local teams.

== Community ==
Curiñanco is home to an indigenous community known as the Kiñe Wen Indigenous Community of Curiñanco.
