= Black Beer Festival =

The Black Beer Festival (Spanish: Fiesta de la Cerveza Negra) is a craft beer festival in Valdivia, Southern Chile. The festival was originally organised in the first week of July 2010 by a consortium of the beer companies Calle Calle, Valbier, Cuello Negro and KM 858. The first edition consisted of a business meeting in Hotel Dreams Valdivia followed by a public event at the Isla Teja Campus of the Austral University of Chile. Following its first edition the festival has been held in Parque SAVAL. The festival is sponsored by the National Tourist Service (SERNATUR).
