= Pablo González =

Pablo González may refer to:

- Pablo González del Amo (1927–2004), Spanish film editor
- Pablo González (Argentine footballer) (born 1985), Argentine footballer
- Pablo González Casanova (1922–2023), Mexican lawyer, sociologist and historian
- Pablo González (Chilean footballer) (born 1986), Chilean footballer
- Pablo González (conductor) (born 1975), Spanish conductor
- Pablo González Cuesta (born 1968), Spanish writer
- Pablo González (footballer, born 1993), Spanish footballer
- Pablo González Garza (1879–1950), Mexican general and governor of San Luis Potosí
- Pablo González Mariñas (born 1944), Spanish politician affiliated with the Galician Coalition
- Pablo González (Mexican footballer) (born 1992), Mexican footballer
- Pablo González (tennis) (born 1982), Colombian tennis player
- Pablo González (Uruguayan footballer) (born 1995), Uruguayan football central midfielder
- Pablo González Velázquez (1664–1727), Spanish Baroque sculptor
- Pablo González Yagüe (born 1982), Spanish journalist
- Pablo Gerardo González (born 1968), Argentine politician, president of YPF

== See also ==
- Pablo Couñago (born 1979), Spanish footballer born Pablo González Couñago
