= Pablo González Cuesta =

Spanish writer (born 1968)

Pablo González Cuesta, known as Pablo Gonz (born 1968), is a Spanish writer.

== Biography ==
He was born in Seville in 1968. Until the age of three, he lived in São Paulo, Brazil. Later, his family moved to Barcelona and then to Madrid where he remained until 2001. He also resided in Punucapa, close to Valdivia (Chile). Actually, back in Seville (Spain).

Pablo Gonz obtained a degree in Geography and History from the Universidad Complutense de Madrid in 1991. In that same period date his first steps in literature, being his major literary references: Gabriel García Márquez, Eduardo Mendoza Garriga, Leo Tolstoy and Stefan Zweig.

== Novels ==
- 1996: La pasión de Octubre (Alba Editorial, Barcelona). (ISBN 8488730055)
- 1997: Experto en silencios (Bitzoc, Palma de Mallorca, Spain). (ISBN 8487789811)
- 1998: Los hijos de León Armendiaguirre (Planeta, Barcelona). (ISBN 8408023578)
- 2008: Libertad (Uqbar, Santiago). (ISBN 9789568601300)
- 2008: Mío (Carisma, Badajoz, Spain). (ISBN 848896448X)
- 2010: Libertad (e-book available in or in https://web.archive.org/web/20081118195118/http://www.booksonboard.com./).
- 2011: Mío (Bubok, Madrid, Spain). (ISBN 9788461504305).
- 2013: Novela 35 lebensráumica (20:13, Valdivia, Chile).
- 2014: Novela 31 (http://www.revistanarrativas.com).
- 2014: Lavrenti y el soldado herido (20:13, Valdivia, Chile). (ISBN 9789563539929)

== Minifictions ==
- 2010: La saliva del tigre (20:13, Valdivia, Chile). (ISBN 9789563327755)

== Awards ==
- 1995: V Prensa Canaria Novel Award for La pasión de Octubre.
- 1997: V Juan March Cencillo Brief Novel Award for Experto en silencios.
- 2008: II Encina de Plata Brief Novel Award for Mío.
- 2011: Calaix de Llibres Short Fiction Award for El Manchado.
