= Caucau River =

Caucau
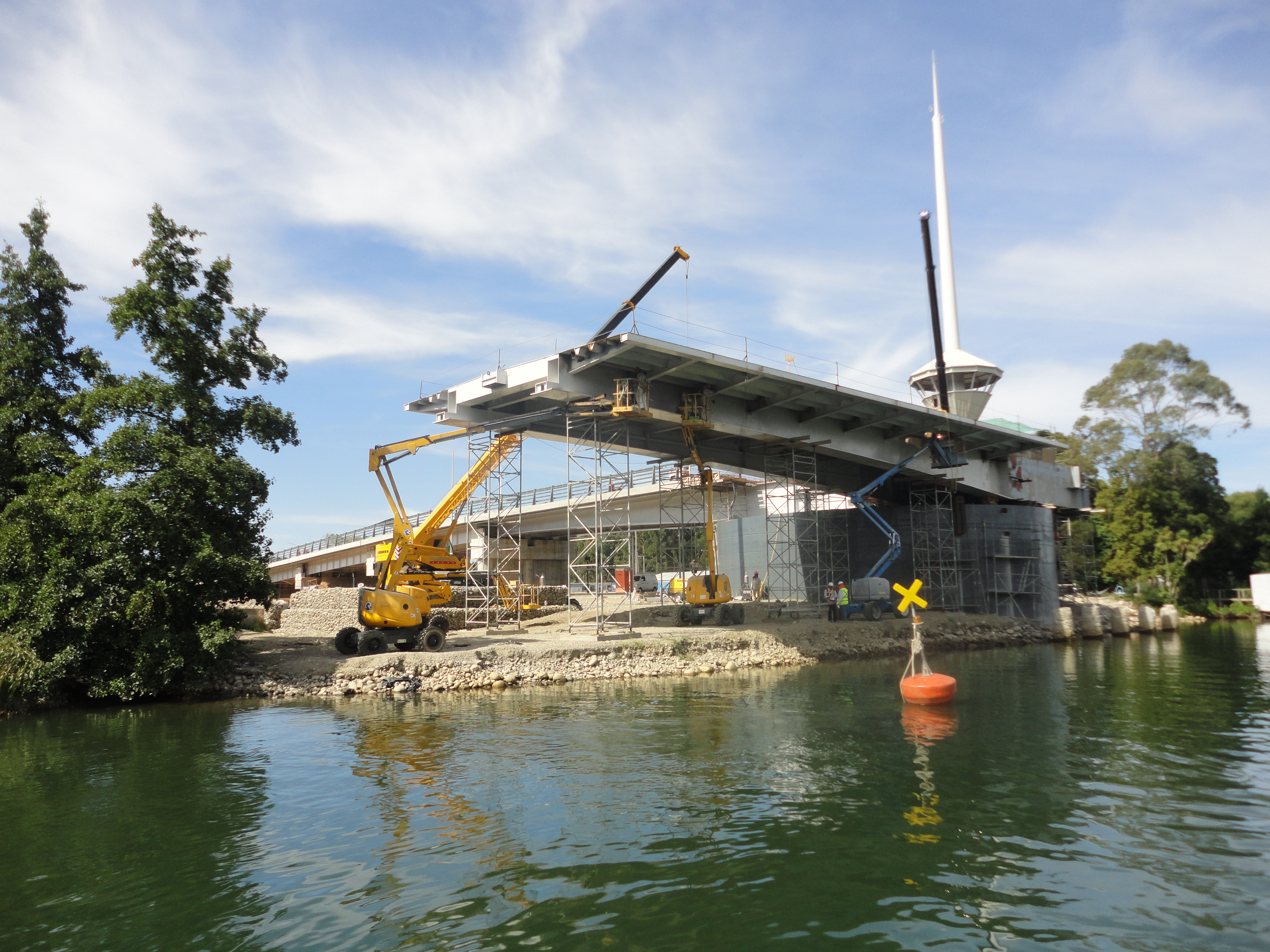
- The bridge over the Cau-cau River that was demolished and rebuilt in 2017.

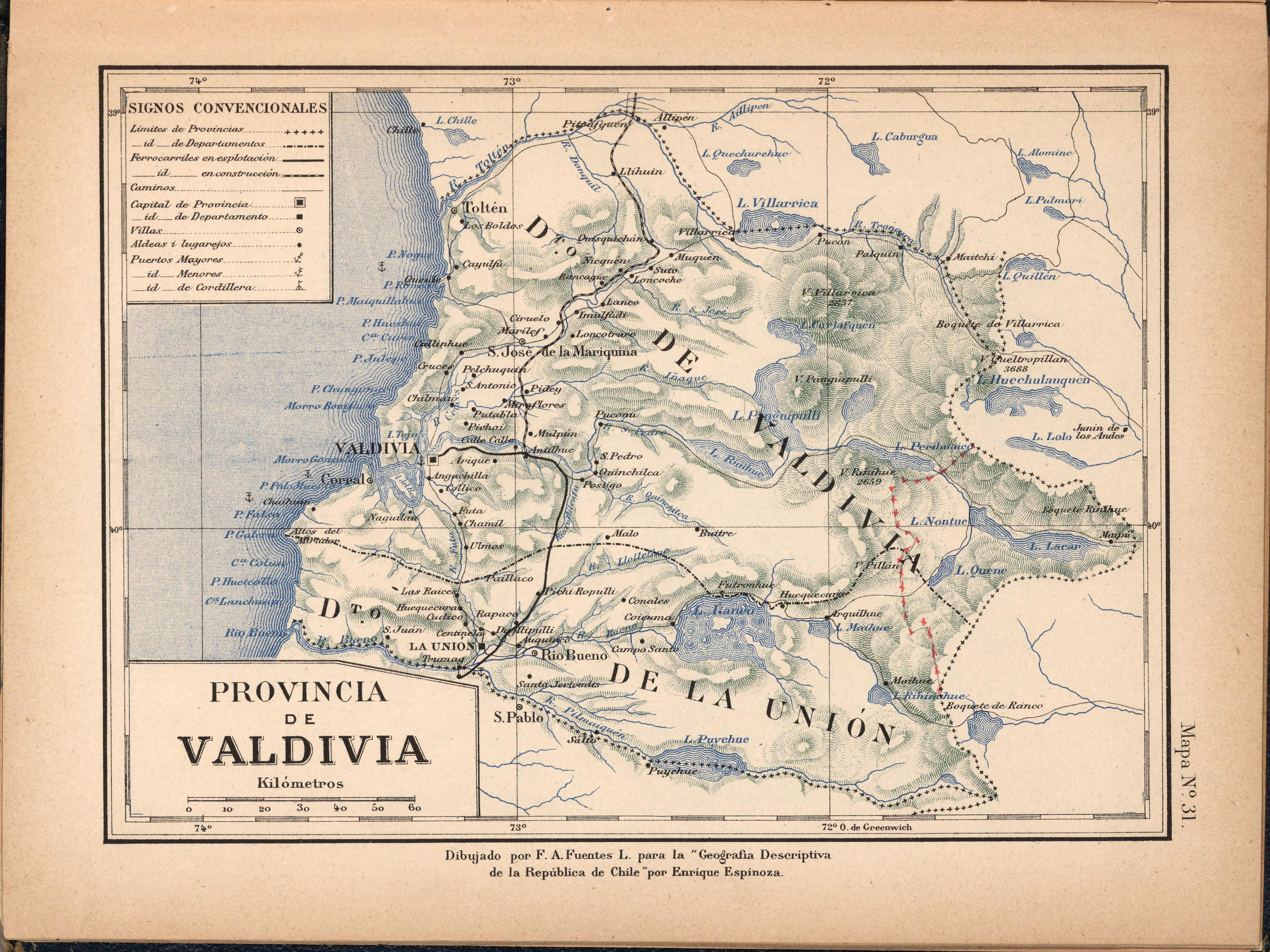
- Isla Teja in a 1903 map

Location
- Country: Chile

Physical characteristics
- Mouth: Calle-Calle River
  - coordinates: 39°48′22″S 73°14′42″W

Caucau River is a minor river in the city of Valdivia, southern Chile. Caucau River acts as a regulating channel between Cruces River and Calle-Calle River forming the Isla Teja island in front of the city centre. Its confluence with Calle-Calle River marks the beginning of Valdivia River. '

The subsidence caused by the 1960 Valdivia earthquake caused a permanent flooding of parts botanical garden of the Austral University of Chile that were next to Caucau River.
