= Pedro de Valdivia Bridge =

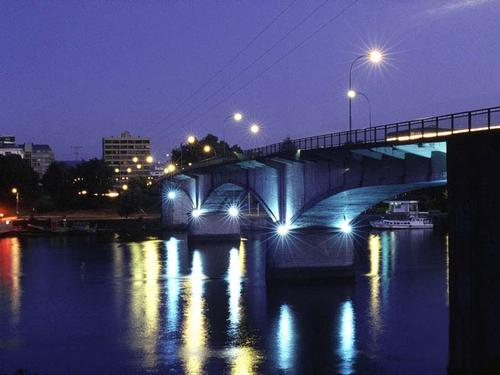
- View of Pedro de Valdivia Bridge from Isla Teja during night.
- Coordinates: 39.8115°S 73.249°W
- Crosses: Valdivia River
- Locale: Valdivia, Chile and Isla Teja
- Official name: Puente Pedro de Valdivia
- Maintained by: Valdivia municipality

Characteristics
- Design: Arch

History
- Opened: 1954

Location
- Interactive map of Pedro de Valdivia Bridge

Pedro de Valdivia Bridge is an arch bridge spanning the Valdivia River. It connects downtown Valdivia with Teja Island, which houses the main campus of the Austral University of Chile. Together with Río Cruces Bridge it allows connection from Valdivia to the coastal town Niebla.

Pedro de Valdivia Bridge is named in honour of the Spanish conquistador Pedro de Valdivia. It was opened in 1954 and survived the 1960 Valdivia earthquake, the greatest earthquake ever recorded, while many nearby buildings collapsed. In the months after the earthquake it also survived the effects of the Riñihuazo flood.
