= Iglesia San Francisco de Valdivia =

Church in Valdivia,, Chile

Coordinates: 39°49′5″S 73°14′51″W

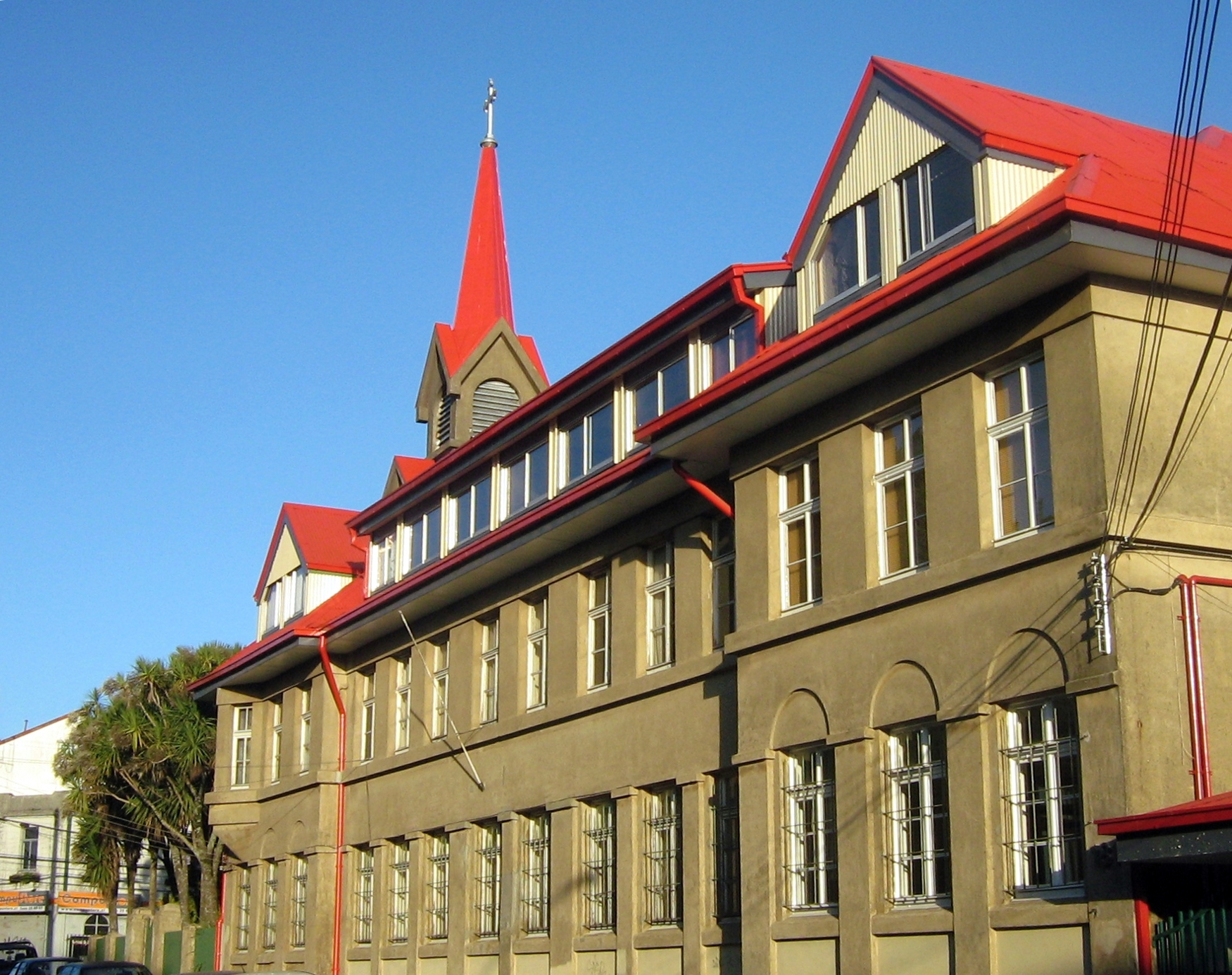

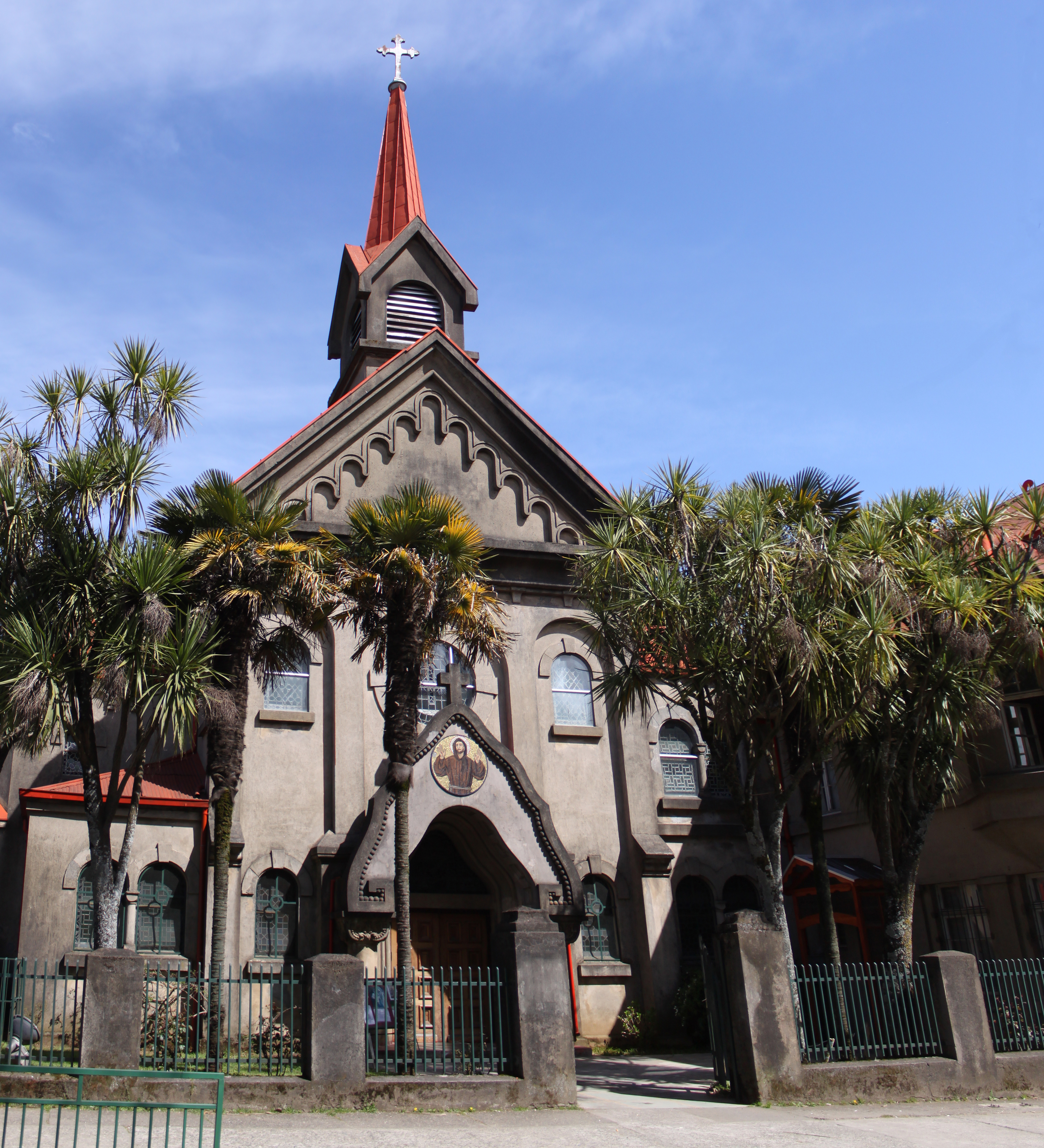
Front of the church

Iglesia San Francisco de Valdivia is a church and convent in Valdivia, Chile. It was built between 1586 and 1628 and is the oldest building in the city, having withstood three major earthquakes. It is a national monument of Chile.
