= Carlos Anwandter =

Chilean pharmacist

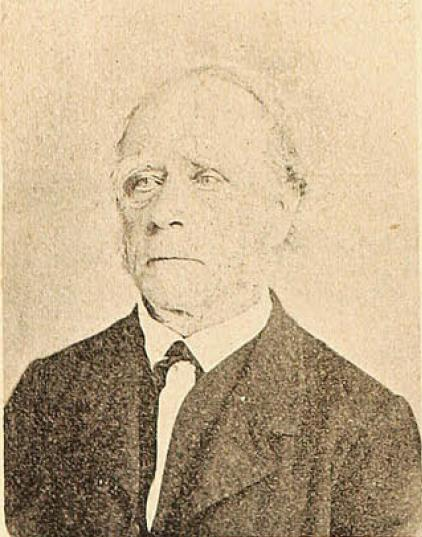
A portrait of Carlos Anwandter

Carlos Anwandter (1 April 1801 in Luckenwalde, Prussia – 10 July 1889 in Valdivia, Chile) was a German political exile who emigrated to Valdivia, Chile in 1850 after participating in the Revolutions of 1848.

== Biography ==
He migrated to Valdivia in 1850, the leader of the first contingent of German colonists sent by Philippi. In 1851 founded the Anwandter brewery in Isla Teja. Among other things in Valdivia founded the first volunteer fire company "Germania" (1 March 1852), the German Club (1853) and the German School (1858) which now bears his name (German Institute Carlos Anwandter), being its first director.

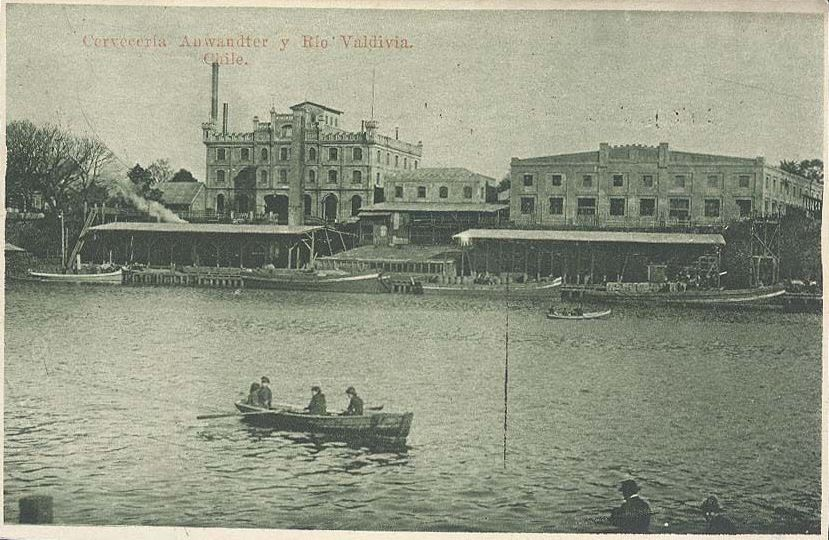
Cerveceria Anwandter, Valdivia, Chile, circa 1900

== Famous quotes ==
As representative of the German immigrants to Chile he swore:

"We will be as honest and laborious Chileans as the best of them. We will defend our adoptive country joining in the ranks of our new countrymen against any foreign oppression with the resolve and strength of the man who defends his fatherland, his family and his interests. Never will the country that adopts us as her children, reason to repent of this enlightened, human and generous deed."

== Legacy ==
Instituto Alemán Carlos Anwandter, Valdivia's German School, is named after him.

== See also ==
- German colonization of Valdivia, Osorno and Llanquihue
