= Andrés Anwandter =

Chilean poet (born 1974)

Andrés Anwandter (born 1974, in Valdivia, Chile) is a Chilean poet, known for his sound poetry.

He studied psychology at the Pontifical Catholic University of Chile, and still works in the field. He was an instructor at the Spanish-American poetry workshop led by Jorge Gissi at the same university, and edited the magazine Humo ("Smoke"), along with Alejandro Zambra. In 1993 he received a scholarship from the Neruda Foundation and in 1995 won first prize in the Feuc Poetry Contest. In 2002 he was awarded the Municipal Prize for Poetry for Especies Intencionales, his second book.

== Works ==
- El árbol del lenguaje en otoño. Santiago: DAEX, 1996.
- Especies Intencionales. Santiago: Quid Ediciones, 2001.
- Square Poems. London: Writers Forum Press, 2002.
- Banda Sonora. Santiago: Ediciones La Calabaza del Diablo, 2006.
