= Instituto Alemán Carlos Anwandter =

Private school in Valdivia, Chile

- German: Deutsche Schule Karl Anwandter

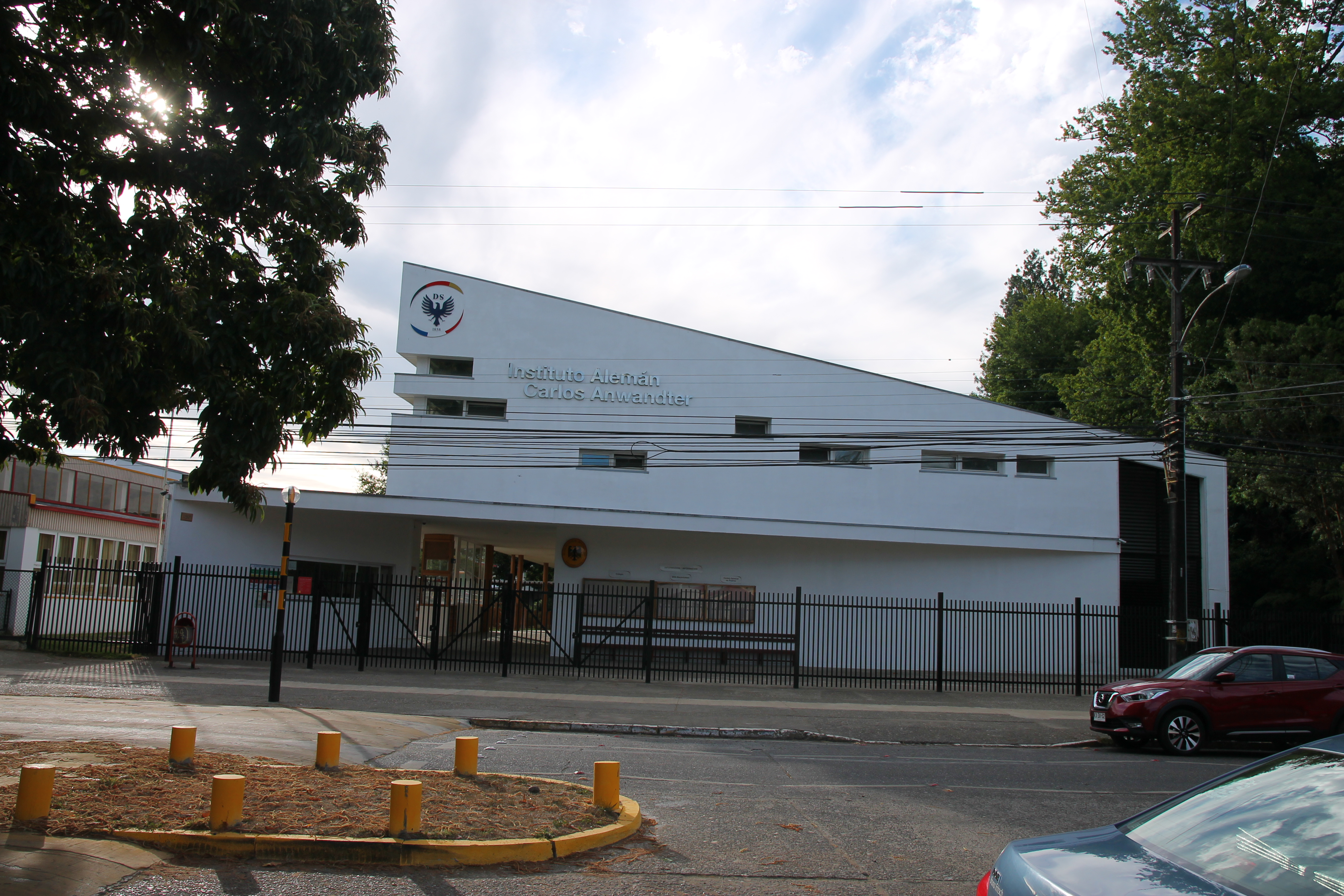

Location
- Location in Valdivia
- Los Laureles 050; Los Ríos; Valdivia, 50900000; Chile; 39.812°S 73.254°W

Information
- Other names: Colegio Alemán de Valdivia; Deutsche Schule Valdivia
- Type: Private
- Established: 1858; 168 years ago
- Founder: Carlos Anwandter
- Website: dsvaldivia.cl

Instituto Alemán Carlos Anwandter (Deutsche Schule Karl Anwandter), also known as Colegio Alemán de Valdivia or Deutsche Schule Valdivia (DS or DSV), is a private school in Valdivia and the oldest German school in Chile. The school was founded in 1858 by Carlos Anwandter to serve the German community in Isla Teja. The school is bilingual and receives money from the government of Germany (formerly Western Germany) depending on how many students approve the DSH German language test.

It was at one time recognized as an overseas German school by the West German government. It is recognized as such by the reunified German government.

== See also ==
- German Chilean
