= Flag of Valdivia =

Valdivia
- Use: City flag
- Proportion: 2:3
- Adopted: 18 March 1554; 472 years ago (The royal decree that gave the city its symbols, the flag, underwent evolutionary informal changes)

The city flag of Valdivia, Chile is a red saltire (crux decussata, X-cross or St. Andrew's cross) on a white field. It is thought to have originated from the present in the city's coat of arms Spanish cross of Burgundy, as the city of Valdivia was an important stronghold of the Spanish Empire.

Flag of the cross of Burgundy used by the Spanish Empire

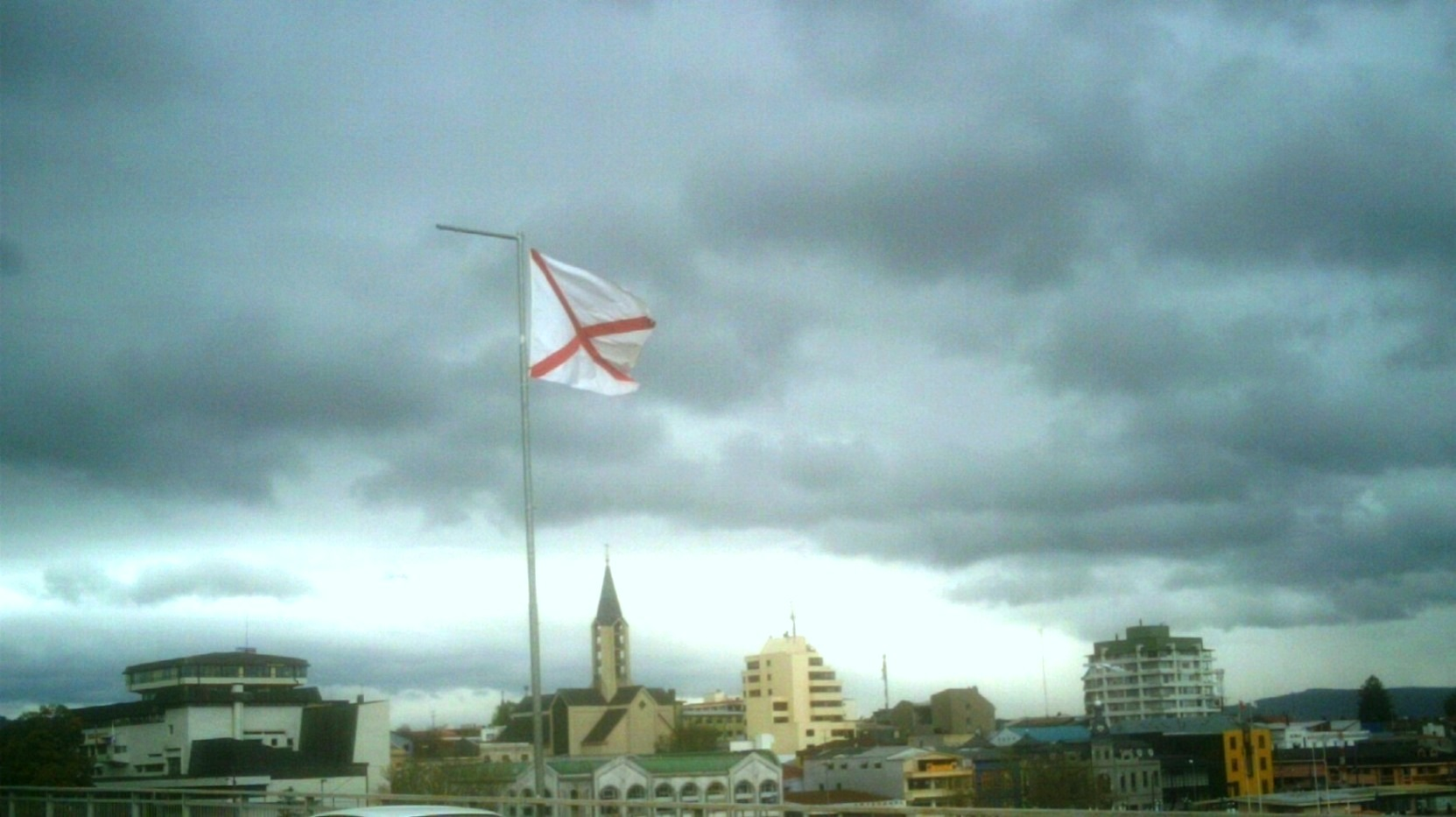
The flag of Valdivia on the Pedro de Valdivia Bridge

On 20 July 1552, five months after the founding of the city of Santa María la Blanca de Valdivia, the council submitted a representation to the king requesting that the nascent city of the New World be granted a title and a coat of arms. Finally, on 18 March 1554, by royal decree, the city of Valdivia was granted the title of "very noble and very loyal" and was granted a coat of arms and flag.

Valdivia was a royalist stronghold during the Spanish-American War of Independence, but after the war the flag was preserved.

The red saltire on a white background is also known in Ireland as Saint Patrick's flag, one of the elements of the Union Jack, in the United States as the flag of Alabama and as Victor flag from the international maritime signal flag, where means letter V and the meaning "I require assistance".
