= Teja Island =

Island in the city of Valdivia, Chile

Teja island
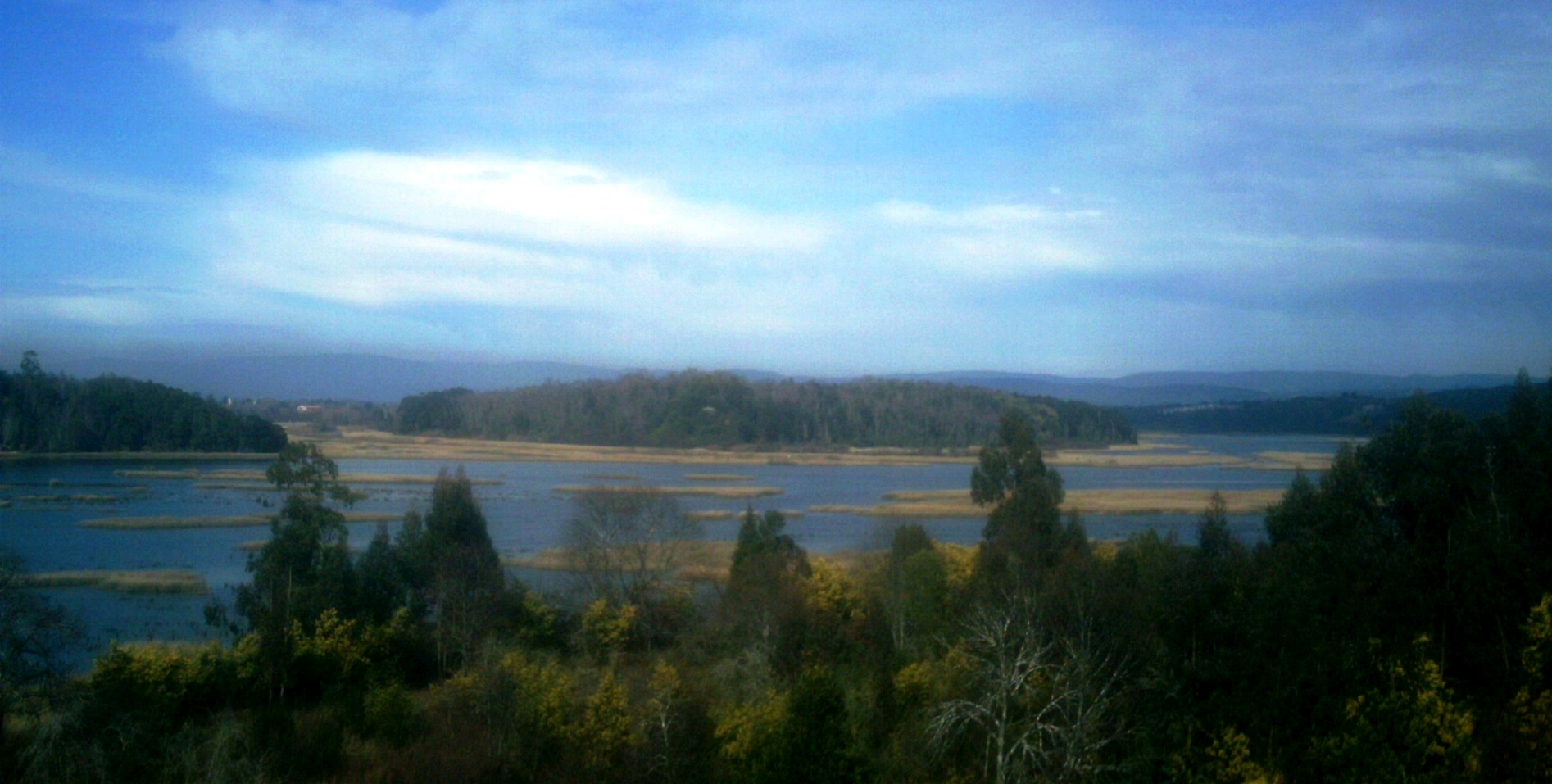
- View of Isla Teja from shores of Cruces River north of it
- Interactive map of Teja island

Geography
- Location: Valdivia, Chile
- Coordinates: 39.8026°S 73.2626°W
- Area: 7.72 km^{2} (2.98 sq mi)
- Highest elevation: 66 m (217 ft)
- Highest point: Northwestern hills

Administration
- Chile
- Region: Los Ríos
- Province: Valdivia
- Commune: Valdivia

Demographics
- Ethnic groups: Chileans, German-Chileans

Teja island (Spanish: Isla Teja) is an island in the city of Valdivia, Chile, surrounded by three rivers: Cau-Cau river to the north, Cruces river to the west and Valdivia river to the southeast. Prior to the mid-19th century, the island was known as isla Valenzuela after Francisco de Valenzuela, an encomendero that settled there in 1552. In the second half of the 19th century, the island became known for its roof tile (Spanish: teja) and brick factory, hence the name isla Teja. Initially it was outside the proper city, but with the arrival of German immigrants, many of them settled there, and since 1939, the island is directly connected to downtown Valdivia through the Pedro de Valdivia bridge. A large section of the island's western riverside sank below water level due to the Great Chilean earthquake of 1960.

The island holds the main campus of Universidad Austral de Chile and since the construction of Río Cruces bridge in 1987 it became the main route to the neighboring areas of Niebla, Corral and Mancera Island.

The island contain wetlands that are protected by the Urban Wetlands Law.
