= Punucapa =

Coordinates: 39°43′S 73°18′W

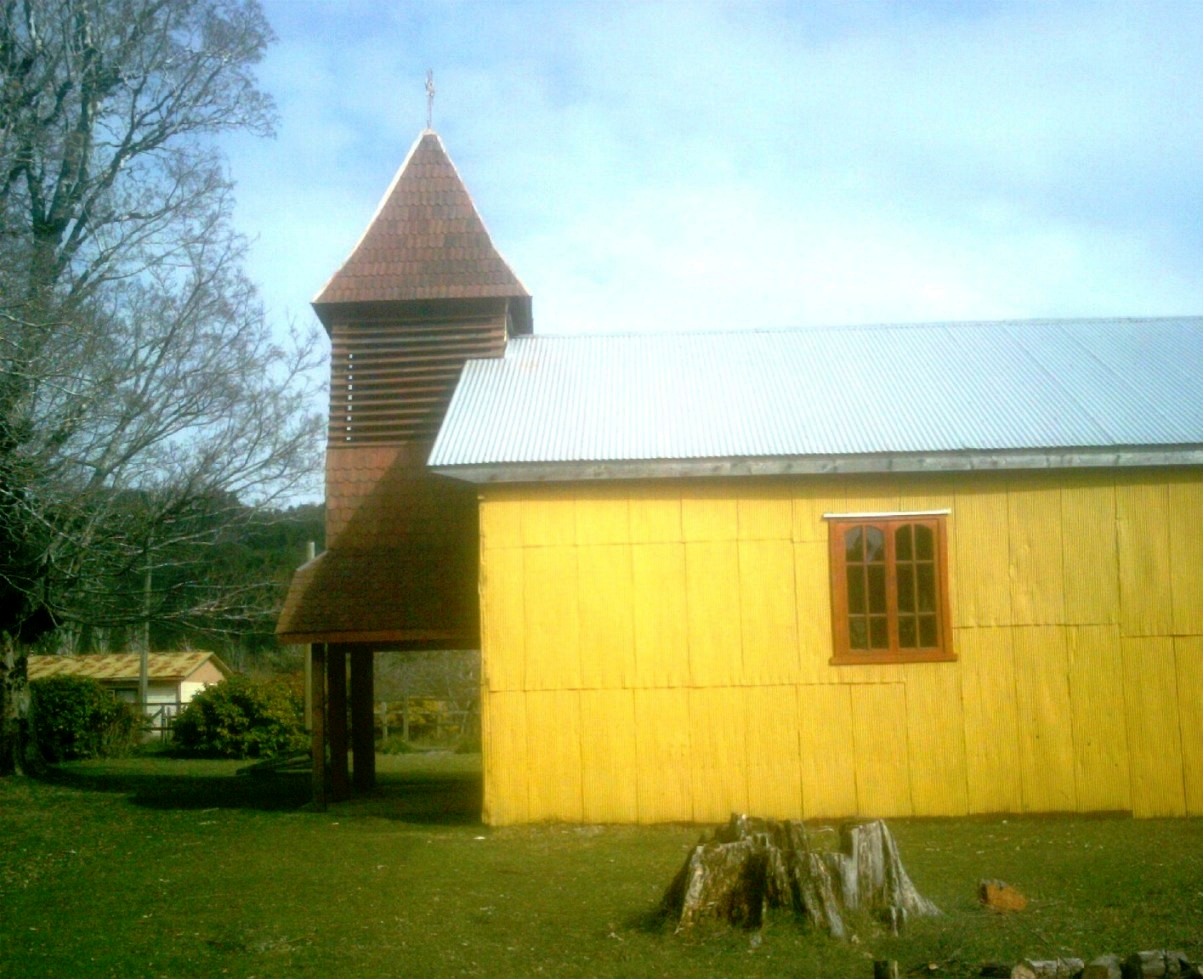
- View of Punucapa's church
- Interactive map of Punucapa
- Region: Los Ríos
- Province: Valdivia
- Municipalidad: Valdivia
- Comuna: Valdivia

Government
  - Type: Municipalidad
  - Alcalde: Carla Amtmann

Population (2017)
  - Total: 119

Sex
  - Men: 43
  - Women: 76
- Time zone: UTC-4 (Chilean Standard)
  - Summer (DST): UTC-3 (Chilean Daylight)
- Area code: Country + town = 56 + 63

Punucapa (from Mapudungun Cunucapi, black/fertile earth for legumes) is a hamlet (Spanish: caserío) of pre-Hispanic origin in Los Ríos Region, Chile. Its isolated location by the Cruces River and the Valdivian Coastal Range has made the village an ecotourism attraction. The wetlands of the river is the home to thousands of birds; the black-necked swan is the most emblematic. In 2017 Punucapa had a population of 119 inhabitants up from 75 in 2002.

Apart from ecotourism, Punucapa is also known for its old tradition of chicha beverage that started with the first appletrees introduced by the Spanish. There is also a brewery run by the Chilean actor Andrés Waas. Close to the hamlet lives the Spanish writer Pablo Gonz.
