= Niebla, Chile =

Coordinates: 39.8714°S 73.3963°W

Niebla
- Town
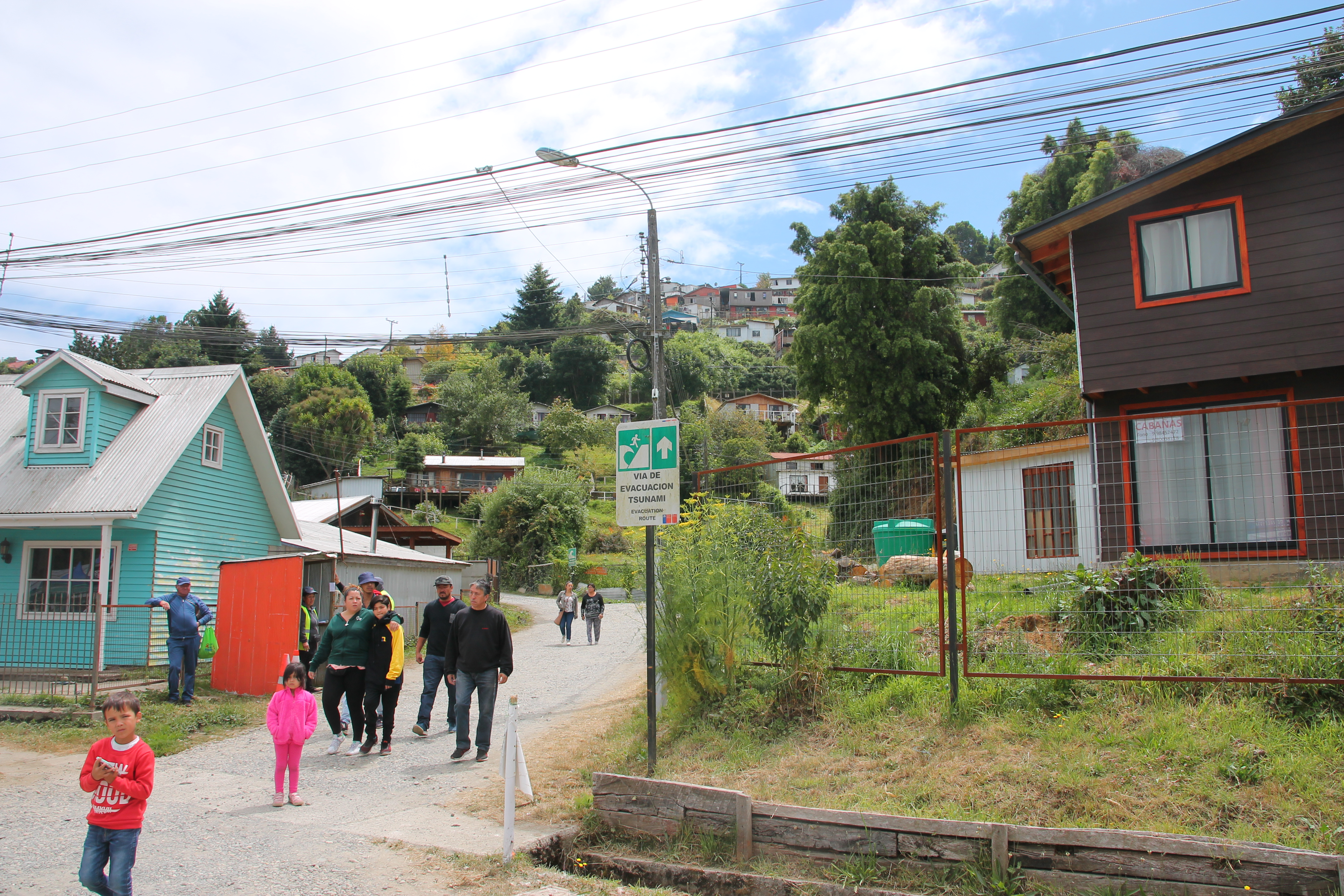
- Houses in Niebla
- Interactive map of Niebla
- Region: Los Ríos
- Province: Valdivia
- Municipalidad: Valdivia
- Comuna: Valdivia

Government
  - Type: Municipalidad
  - Alcalde: Carla Amtmann

Population (2017)
  - Total: 2,989

Sex
  - Men: 1,958
  - Women: 2,031
- Time zone: UTC−04:00 (Chilean Standard)
  - Summer (DST): UTC−03:00 (Chilean Daylight)
- Area code: Country + town = 56 + 63

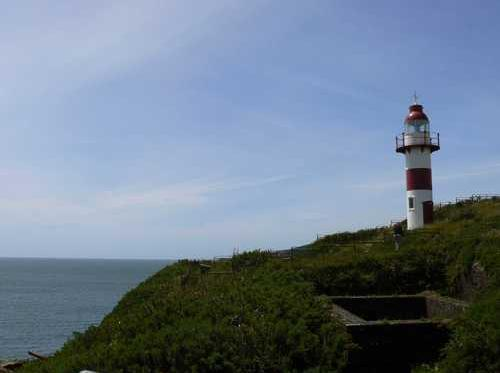
Picture of Niebla's lighthouse situated just above the Niebla fort

Niebla (Spanish for fog) is a coastal Chilean town close to the city of Valdivia, Valdivia Province, Los Ríos Region. Niebla is located on the northern edge, at the mouth of the Valdivia River, across from Corral. Niebla's beach and folk market are popular tourist destinations during the summer, together with the ruins of a Spanish colonial fort and its museum.

In 2017 Niebla had a population of 2,989 inhabitants up from 2,202 in 2002.

== See also ==
- Valdivian Fort System
- List of towns in Chile
