= Valdivia River =

River in Chile

Valdivia River (Río Valdivia)
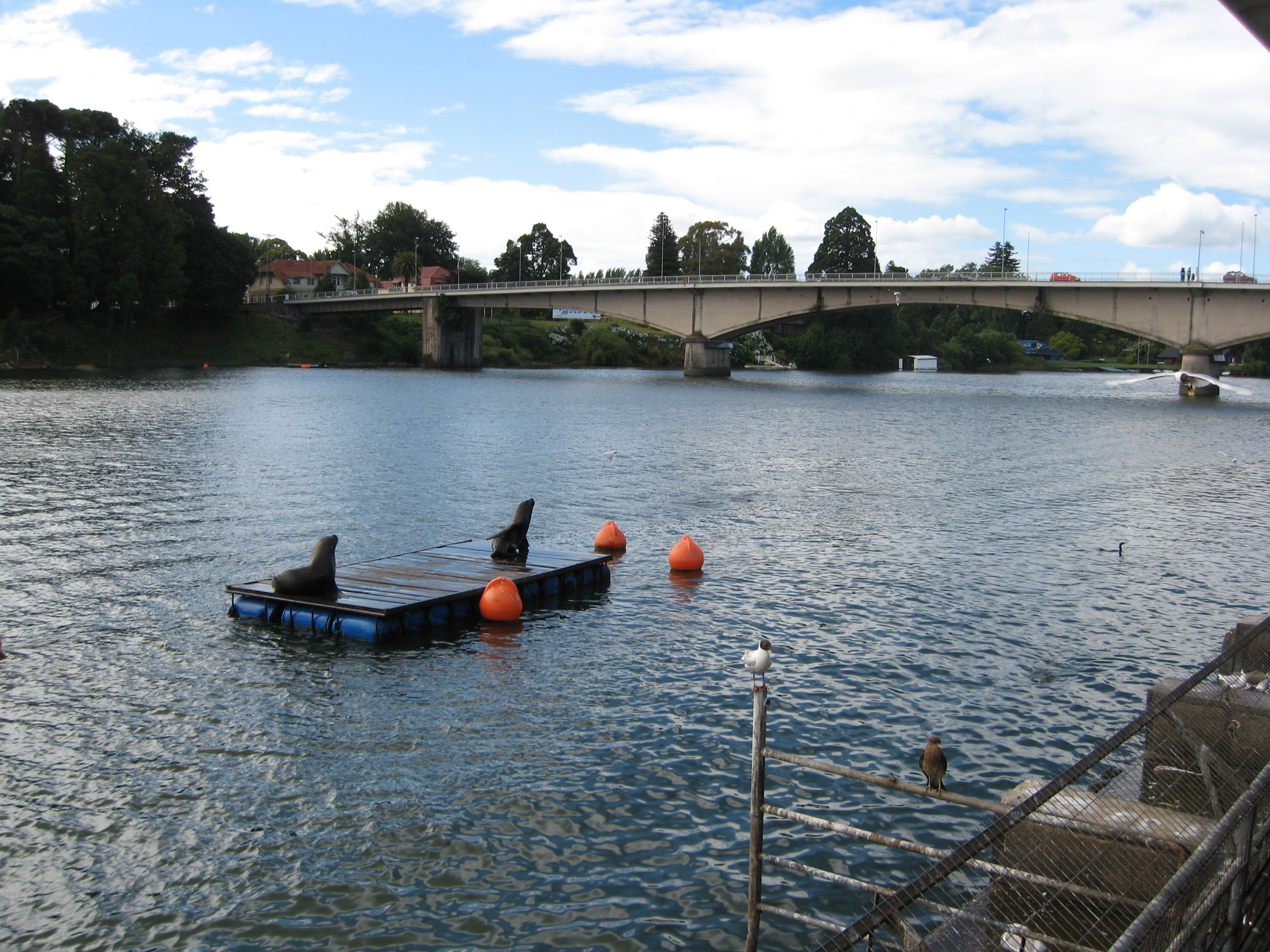
- View of the upper course of Valdivia River. Pedro de Valdivia Bridge is seen in the background.

- Map of the mouth of the Valdivia

Location
- Country: Chile

Physical characteristics
- Source
  - location: Calle-Calle River, Caucau River
- Mouth
  - location: Corral Bay, Pacific Ocean
  - coordinates: 39°52′37″S 73°22′56″W
  - elevation: 0 m (0 ft)
- Length: 15 km (9.3 mi)
- Basin size: 10,275 km^{2} (3,967 sq mi)
- Discharge
  - average: 687 m^{3}/s (24,300 cu ft/s)

Basin features
- Basin population: 168,489 (2002)

The Valdivia River or Río Valdivia, as it is known locally, is a major river in southern Chile. It is the continuation of the Calle-Calle River, from the point where it meets the Cau-Cau River in the city of Valdivia. The Valdivia river ends in Corral Bay, on the Pacific coast. Other tributaries are the Cruces River, the Tornagaleones River and the Futa River. Pedro de Valdivia Bridge crosses the river in downtown Valdivia.

Its estuary has maximum depths that range from 7 to 22 m and hosts a saline wedge. The discharge of the river varies with the time of year with July being the month with the largest discharge (1293 m^{3}/s) and March the one with the lowest (592 m^{3}/s). During times of low discharge saline bottoms waters penetrate upstream all the way to its tributary Calle-Calle River.

The foraminiferal fauna of the wetlands adjoining the river is dominated by Trochamminita salsa.
