= Valdivia =

City in Chile

- City and Commune
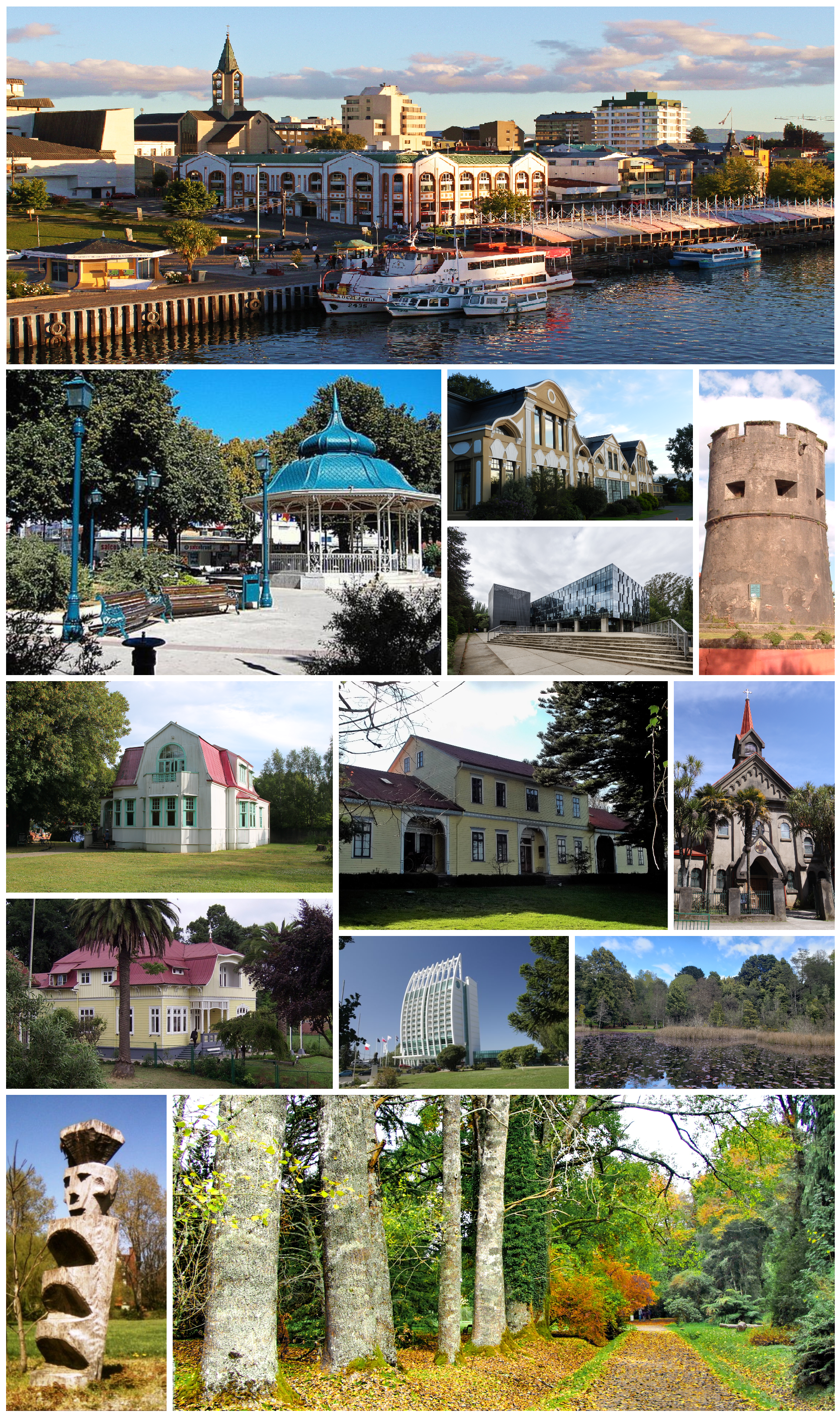
- From top to bottom, left to right: Valdivia waterfront; town square; Hotel Naguilán (top); Sciences Building of Austral University (bottom); Los Canelos tower; Rodolfo Amando Philippi Museum; Historical and Anthropologic Museum Maurice van de Maele; St. Francisco Church; Prochelle House; Dreams Hotel & Casino; Los Lotos Lagoon on Teja Island; Mapuche's Rewe; and Botanical Garden of Valdivia

- Flag Coat of arms Location of the Valdivia commune in Los Ríos Region Location in Chile
- Nicknames: The City of Rivers, The Pearl of the South of Chile, Chile's Brewery Capital
- Motto: Muy Noble y Muy Leal ("Most noble and most loyal")
- Coordinates: 39°48′50″S 73°14′45″W
- Country: Chile
- Region: Los Ríos
- Province: Valdivia
- Founded as: Santa María la Blanca de Valdivia
- Founded: 9 February 1552
- Named for: Pedro de Valdivia

Government
  - Type: Municipality
  - Alcaldesa: Carla Amtmann (RD)

Area
  - Total: 1,015.6 km^{2} (392.1 sq mi)
- Elevation: 5 m (16 ft)

Population (2025 Census)
  - Total: 110,980
  - Density: 109.28/km^{2} (283.02/sq mi)
  - Urban: 129,952
  - Rural: 10,607
- Demonym: Valdivian

Sex
  - Men: 68,510
  - Women: 72,049
- Time zone: UTC−04:00 (CLT)
  - Summer (DST): UTC−03:00 (CLST)
- Postal code: 5090000
- Area code: country 56 + city 63
- Climate: Cfb
- Website: Municipality of Valdivia (in Spanish)

Valdivia (Spanish pronunciation: [balˈdiβja]; Mapuche: Ainil) is a city and commune in southern Chile, administered by the Municipality of Valdivia. The city is named after its founder, Pedro de Valdivia, and is located at the confluence of the Calle-Calle, Valdivia, and Cau-Cau Rivers, approximately 15 km (9 mi) east of the coastal towns of Corral and Niebla. Since October 2007, Valdivia has been the capital of Los Ríos Region and is also the capital of Valdivia Province. The 2024 Chilean census recorded 170,043 inhabitants (Valdivianos) in the commune of Valdivia. The main economic activities of Valdivia include tourism, wood pulp manufacturing, forestry, metallurgy, and beer production. The city is also the home of the Austral University of Chile, founded in 1954, the Centro de Estudios Científicos and one of Chile's three environmental courts.

The city of Valdivia and the Chiloé Archipelago were once the two southernmost outliers of the Spanish Empire. From 1645 to 1740, the city depended directly on the Viceroyalty of Peru, which financed the building of the Valdivian fort system that turned Valdivia into one of the most fortified cities of the New World. In the mid-19th century, Valdivia was the port of entry for German immigrants who settled in the city and surrounding areas.

In 1960, Valdivia was severely damaged by the Great Chilean earthquake, the most powerful earthquake ever recorded, at magnitude 9.5. The earthquake caused c. 2 m of subsidence around Valdivia leaving large areas of former pastures and cultivated fields permanently flooded. Today there are various protected wetlands within the urbanised area of Valdivia as well as in its outskirts.

== History ==
History of Valdivia
← / Discovery of Corral Bay; ← / Founding of Valdivia; ← / Major earthquake; ← / Mapuches sack the city; ← / Dutch occupation; ← / City relocated to its current location; ← / Major earthquake; ← / Major earthquake; ← / First German immigrants arrive; ← / A waterspout hits Valdivia; ← / Railroad reaches Valdivia; ← / Major fire; ← / First Valdivian Week; ← / Calle-Calle Bridge opens; ← / Austral University of Chile opens; ← / Great Chilean Earthquake; ← / Becomes part of Los Lagos Region; ← / Río Cruces Bridge opens; ← / Los Ríos Region is created

=== Pre-Hispanic times (12,000 BC – 1543) ===
The area around Valdivia may have been populated since 12,000 – 11,800 BC, according to archaeological discoveries in Monte Verde (less than 200 km south of Valdivia), which would place it about a thousand years before the Clovis culture in North America. This challenges the "Clovis First" model of migration to the New World. Researchers speculate that the first inhabitants of Valdivia and Chile travelled to America by watercraft and not across a land-bridge in the Bering Strait.

During at least the Middle Archaic, southern Chile was populated by indigenous groups who shared a common lithic culture called the Chan-Chan Complex, named for the archaeological site of Chan-Chan located some 35 km north of Valdivia along the coast.

==== Ainil ====
By the time of the arrival of the Spanish conquistadores, Valdivia was inhabited by the Huilliche (Mapudungun for People of the South). The Huilliche and Mapuche were both referred to by the Spaniards as Araucanos. Their main language was the Huilliche language, considered a dialect of Mapudungun and yet unintelegible with other dialects.

A large village called Ainil stood where present-day downtown Valdivia has been developed. The Huilliche called the river, Ainilebu (now known as the Valdivia River). Ainil seemed to have been an important trade center; it was a port on the sea and had access to the interior via the network of the Cruces and Calle-Calle rivers, both tributaries of the Valdivia. Ainil may be described as "a kind of little Venice," as it had large areas of wetlands and canals. Since that period, most of these waterways and wetlands have been drained or filled. The market in Ainil received shellfish and fish from the coast, legumes from Punucapa, and other foods from San José de la Mariquina, an agricultural zone northeast of Valdivia. A remnant of this ancient trade is the modern Feria Fluvial (English: Riverside Market) on the banks of Valdivia River. The surroundings of Valdivia were described as extensive plains having a large population that cultivated potatoes, maize, quinoa and legumes, among other crops. The population has been estimated by some historians as 30 to 40 thousand inhabitants as of 1548, based on descriptions made by the conquistadors. Pedro Mariño de Lobera, an early conquistador and chronicler, wrote that there were half a million Indians living within ten leagues (one league is roughly 4.2 km) from the city. Other historians consider these numbers too high and argue that early Spaniards usually exaggerated in their descriptions.

Later the British naturalist Charles Darwin observed that "there is not much cleared land near Valdivia." This suggests that pre-Hispanic agriculture in Valdivia was far more extensive than the agriculture practiced in the early 19th century at the time of his visit.

=== First Spanish city (1544–1604) ===
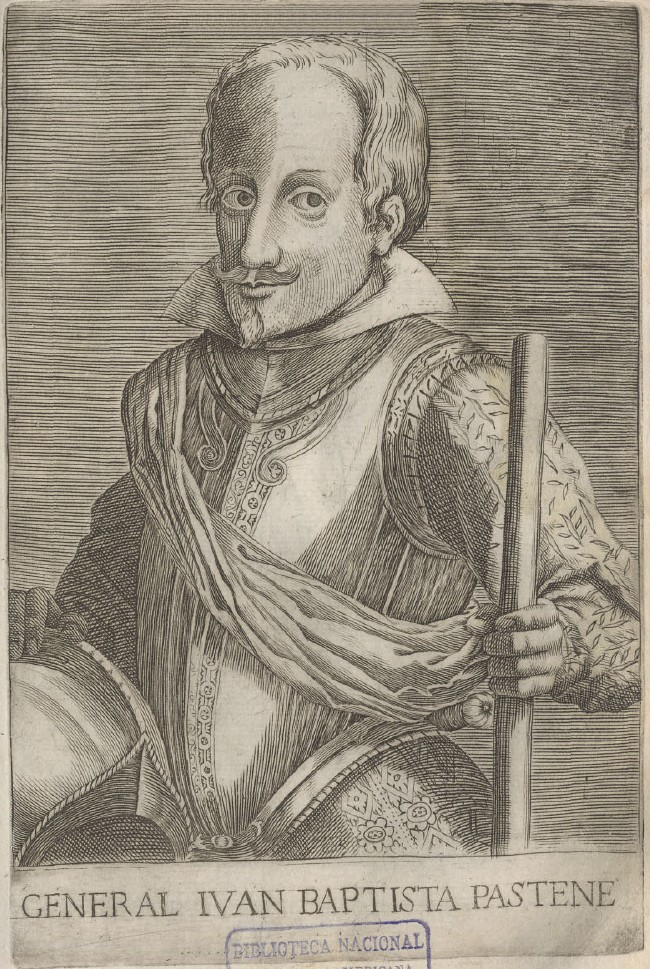
Idealized illustration of Pastene from Alonso de Ovalle's "Histórica relación del Reyno de Chile"

The first European to visit Valdivia River's estuary was the Genoese captain Juan Bautista Pastene, who took possession of it in 1544 in the name of the Spanish king, Charles V. He named the river after the Governor of Chile, Pedro de Valdivia.

Pedro later travelled by land to the river described by Pastene, and founded the city of Valdivia in 1552 as Santa María la Blanca de Valdivia. It was the southernmost Spanish settlement in the Americas at the time of the founding. Following the establishment of the church of Santa María la Blanca in Valdivia, more buildings were constructed. Mariño de Lobera described it as "the second city in the Kingdom of Chile". Many of Chile's most influential conquistadors and future governors were granted land in Valdivia, such as Jerónimo de Alderete, Rodrigo de Quiroga, Francisco and Pedro de Villagra, apart from Pedro de Valdivia himself.

Jerónimo de Bibar, a chronicler who witnessed the founding wrote:

"Having the governor seen such good comarca and site for populate a city and riverside of such good river, and having such good harbour he founded a city and named it ciudad de Valdivia, and he assigned Alcaldes and a town council."

After Pedro de Valdivia's death, the war with the Mapuches, called the War of Arauco, continued. The Spanish made many attempts to defeat the Mapuche and defend the cities and forts built on their territory. On 17 March of 1575, the city was damaged by a massive earthquake. It has since been likened to the Great Chilean earthquake of 1960 in terms of damage.

Until 1575, the Huilliche of Valdivia did not organize any notable resistance against the Spanish. They had fought as Indios amigos with the Spanish against the northern Mapuche in the Arauco War. But that year 4,000 Indians who had been fighting in Martín Ruiz de Gamboa's army rebelled after returning to the area of Valdivia.

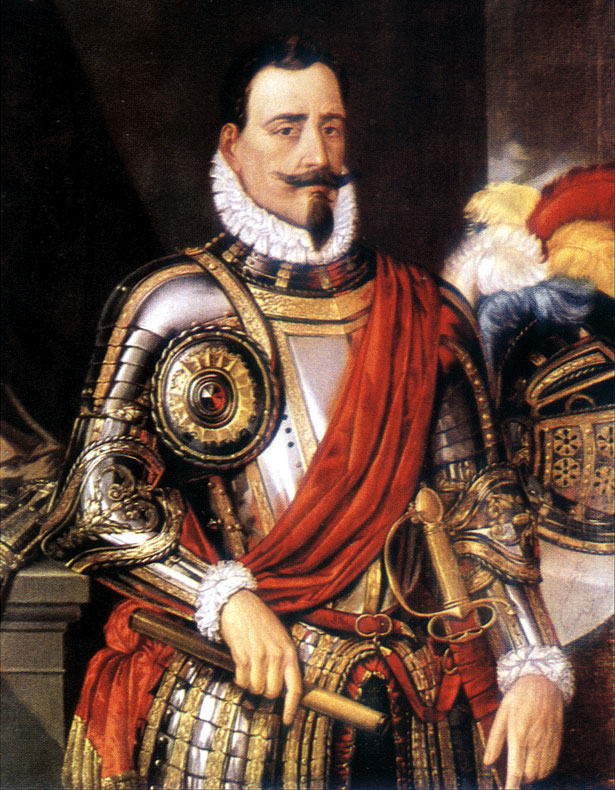
Pedro de Valdivia, conquistador of Chile and founder of Valdivia

During the 16th century, the economy of Valdivia was sustained by trade in agricultural products from nearby areas and by the coining and export of placer gold from Villarrica, Madre de Dios and Osorno. In Lima and the rest of Chile, people referred to all the gold from these sources as "gold from Valdivia." Many merchants of Lima had envoys in Valdivia, and the city developed a large ship building industry. It produced the largest ships in the Kingdom of Chile.

After the demoralising Battle of Curalaba in 1598, in which the Mapuche killed governor Óñez de Loyola, the Mapuche and Huilliche made a mass rebellion. The Indians destroyed or forced the abandonment of all the Spanish settlements and forts in their lands, in what came to be known as the Destruction of the Seven Cities. On the morning of 24 November 1599, the Huilliche attacked the city and massacred its inhabitants, some few being rescued by the ships in the harbour. The border of the Spanish Empire shifted north of the Bío-Bío River. Valdivia was re-established but it was a Spanish enclave surrounded by native Huilliche territory. Together with Castro, Chile on the island of Chiloé, it was one of the southernmost colonies of the Empire.

Eleven days after the first destruction of Valdivia, a group of 270 Spanish soldiers arrived from Perú. The commander of the troops, colonel Francisco del Campo was convinced that the city of Valdivia needed to be repopulated. After Francisco del Campo's expedition left, the Dutch corsair Sebastian de Cordes occupied the site of Valdivia for some months, giving the Dutch government information about this abandoned part of the Spanish Empire. The Spaniards returned on 13 March 1602, when captain Francisco Hernández Ortiz established a fort on the ruins of the city. On 24 September natives attacked the fort unsuccessfully, but laid siege. The Spaniards could not acquire food or supplies, and on 3 February 1604 abandoned the fort, with the last starving survivors rescued by ship.

=== Ruins of Valdivia and Dutch occupation (1604–1645) ===
The Dutch governor of the East Indies Hendrik Brouwer, learned about the situation in Valdivia, decided to establish a base there for further attacks against the Viceroy of Peru. This plan was well accepted as the Netherlands was at war with Spain. The Dutch had previously taken the North of Brazil from the Spanish-Portuguese crown, and the idea of creating a South American empire was attractive. In spite of his advanced age, Hendrik Brouwer left his post as governor in the East Indies to personally lead the expedition. The Dutch fleet destroyed the Fort of Carelmapu and the city of Castro before arriving at Corral Bay at the mouth of the Valdivia River. Hendrik Brouwer died 7 August in Puerto Inglés while waiting for better winds to sail north to Valdivia. John Maurice of Nassau, while in charge of the Dutch part of Brazil, had equipped the expedition and had secretly appointed Elias Herckman as commander if Brouwer died. Herckman finally occupied the ruins of Valdivia in 1643, renaming it Brouwershaven. The Dutch did not find the gold mines they expected and the hostility of the natives forced them to leave on 28 October 1643.

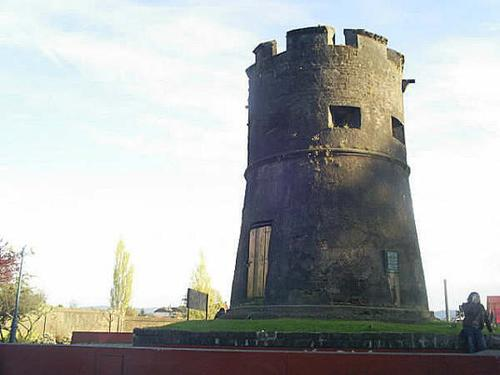
Image of Torreón El Canelo restored in the 1850s. It is one of two remaining Spanish towers in Valdivia used to defend the city and one of the few remaining colonial structures.

=== Second Spanish city (1645–1810) ===
Pedro Álvarez de Toledo y Leiva, the Viceroy of Peru from 1639 to 1648, knew of the strategic importance of Valdivia and decided to repopulate and fortify it once and for all. He partially financed the expedition to repopulate Valdivia with his own capital. The contingent in charge of the mission was organized in Peru and consisted of seventeen ships filled with building materials and supplies that astounded contemporaries by its magnitude. The local government of Chile could not secure Valdivia as it was engaged in continuous war with the Mapuches and was deeply dependent on the Real Situado, an annual payment of silver from Potosí to finance the army of Chile. The Valdivia enclave was placed directly under the control of the Viceroyalty of Peru, which administered Valdivia from its repopulation in 1645 until 1740. Corral, located on the river entrance to Valdivia, became one of the most fortified bays of the time, with 17 forts. During this time, it was several times proposed to move the city of Valdivia to Mancera Island. Valdivia's original site, downtown of modern Valdivia, was repopulated in 1684.

Once Spanish presence in Valdivia was reestablished in 1645, authorities sent convicts from all over the Viceroyalty of Peru to construct the Valdivian Fort System. The convicts, many of whom were Afro-Peruvians, became later soldier-settlers once they had served their sentences. Close contacts with indigenous Mapuche meant many soldiers were bilingual in Spanish and Mapudungun. A 1749 census in Valdivia shows that Afro-descendants represented at least 0.24% of the local population.

Beginning in the mid-18th century, Valdivia left its past as an enclave behind, and a period of agricultural expansion begun. The expansion, mainly directed to the south, was done mostly by peaceful means, but hostilities with indigenous Huilliches did occur. After the Valdivian colonization had reached Bueno River, Spanish authorities pushed for connecting the city of Valdivia with the settlements at Chacao Channel by a road.

=== Independence and growth (1810–1959) ===
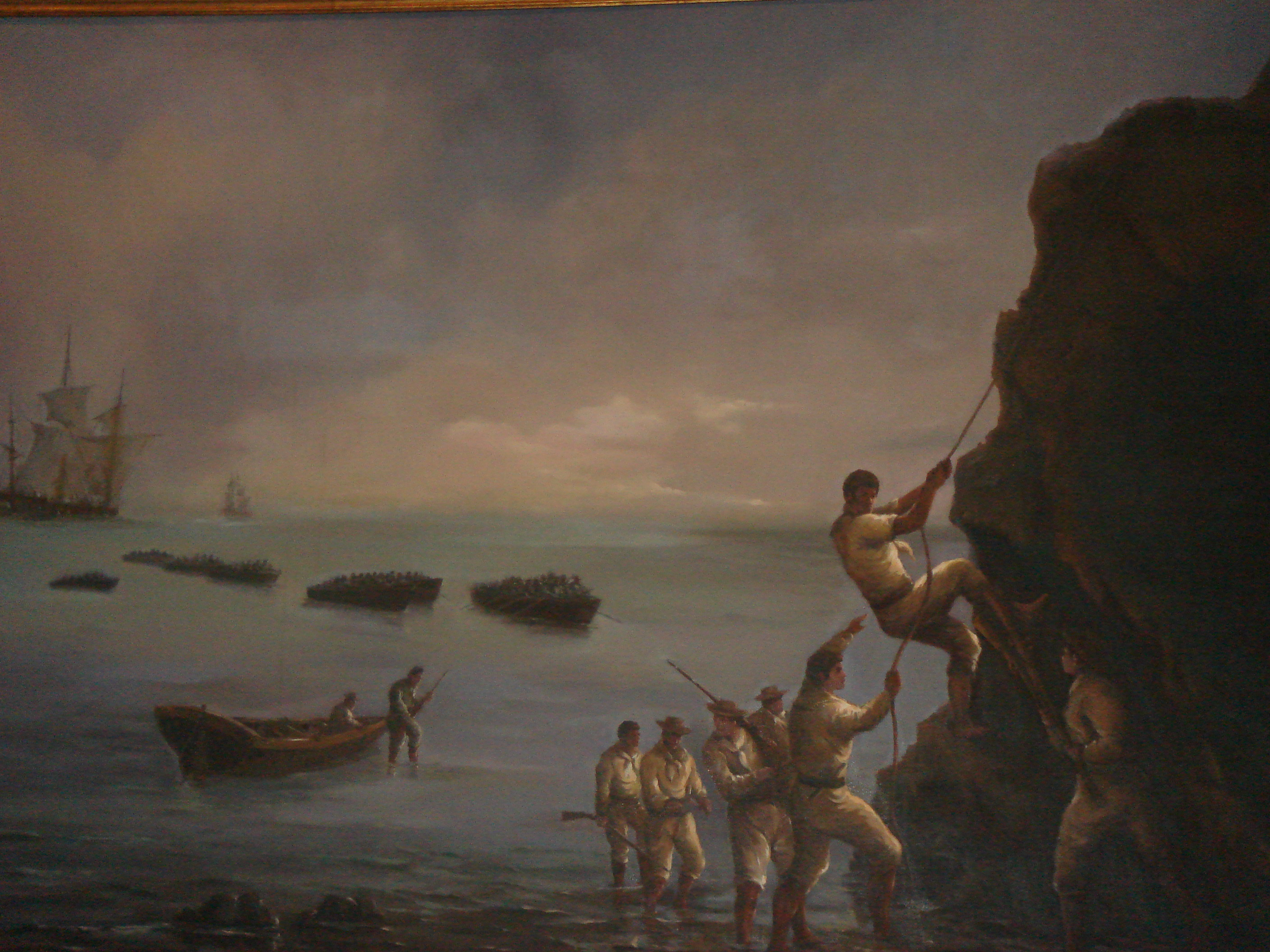
A painting of the assault on Corral fort

Self-governing juntas appeared in Spanish America and Spain after Napoleon occupied Spain and held the Spanish king Fernando VII captive. Many juntas, as was the case of Chile, declared plans to rule their territory in the absence of the legitimate king. At the time of the first governing junta of Chile in 1810, the Valdivian governor, an Irishman, Albert Alexander Eagar, led the celebration of what was seen as an affirmation of the legitimacy of the Spanish king. However, Valdivian independentists, such as Camilo Henríquez, saw an opportunity to gain absolute independence from Spain, organized a coup on 1 November 1811, and joined other Chilean cities that were already revolting against the old order. Four months after the coup, on 16 March 1812 a counterrevolutionary coup took control of the city and created a War Council. The War Council broke trade relations with the rest of Chile and confirmed Valdivia's loyalty to the Spanish government.

Even after several defeats of the Spanish troops during the Chilean Independence War, Valdivia and Chiloé remained loyal to the Spanish King. By 1820 the newly created Chilean Navy, commanded by Lord Thomas Cochrane, captured Valdivia, but failed to liberate Chiloé. Cochrane's land-based attack took the Spanish by surprise, avoiding a direct confrontation with the highly defended forts at the entrance to the Valdivia River. When loyal troops in Valdivia heard the news about the fall of Corral they sacked the city and fled south to reinforce Chiloé, passing by Osorno.

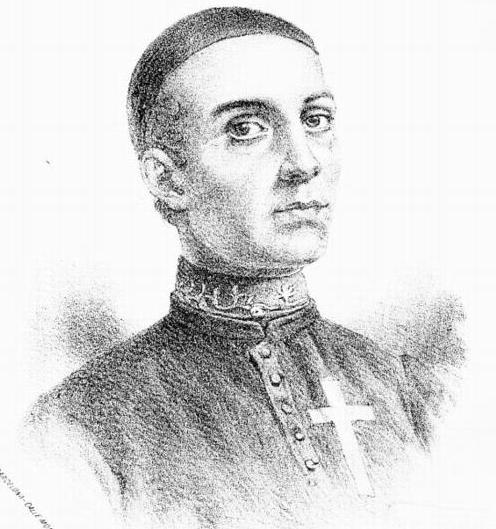
Friar Camilo Henríquez, born in Valdivia, was one of the founding fathers of the Republic of Chile.

Chilean Supreme Director, and Libertador, Bernardo O'Higgins, founded the city of La Unión in south of Valdivia in 1821, to secure the way to Osorno, a city that had been repopulated in 1796 by his father Ambrosio O'Higgins. Valdivia had been a province of the General Captaincy of Chile and was in 1826 incorporated as one of the eight provinces of Chile.

On 20 February 1835, Valdivia was affected by the worst earthquake in the area in several decades, an event witnessed by Charles Darwin. He also stated that "there is not much cleared land near Valdivia" which contrasted with the description made by early Spaniards of large fields and extensive croplands.

The expansion and economic development of the city were limited in the early 19th century. To jump-start economic development, the Chilean government initiated a highly focussed immigration program under Bernhard Eunom Philippi and later Vicente Pérez Rosales as government agents. Through this program, thousands of Germans settled in the area, incorporating then-modern technology and know-how to develop agriculture and industry. While immigrants that arrived to the Llanquihue area were often poor farmers, Valdivia received more educated immigrants, including political exiles and merchants. Some of the immigrants that arrived in Valdivia established workshops and built new industries. One of the most famous immigrants was Carlos Anwandter, an exile from Luckenwalde who arrived in Valdivia in 1850 and in 1858 founded Chile's first German school. Other Germans left the city and became settlers, drawn by the promise of free land. They were often given forested land, which they cleared to turn into farms. Native Mapuche and Huilliche either sold their land or were pushed into reservations. The Osorno department of Valdivia Province was moved to Llanquihue Province (created in 1853) as consequence of German immigration to the Llaquihue area.

We shall be honest and laborious Chileans as the best of them, we shall defend our adopted country joining in the ranks of our new countrymen, against any foreign oppression and with the decision and firmness of the man that defends his country, his family and his interests. Never will have the country that adopts us as its children, reason to repent of such illustrated, human and generous proceeding,...

— Carlos Anwandter

Valdivia prospered with industries, including shipyards, the Hoffmann gristmill, the Rudloff shoe factory, the Anwandter beer company and many more. The steel mills of Corral were the largest recorded private investment in Chile at the time, and were the first steel mills in South America. In 1891 Valdivia became a commune according to a law that created such subdivisions. After the Malleco Viaduct was built in 1890 the railroads advanced further south, reaching Valdivia in 1895. The first passenger train arrived in 1899. In 1909 a fire destroyed 18 city blocks in downtown Valdivia, which were rebuilt with modern concrete buildings. By 1911 lumber production, from clearing of native forests, became the most important industry. Cattle-raising was a growing industry, and wheat was grown on the cleared lands. Lumber, cattle, leather, flour and beer were exported. In 1895 the city's population was 8,062 inhabitants and was estimated at 9,704 in 1902.

Valdivia, situated at some distance from the coast, on the Calle-calle river, is a German town. Everywhere you meet German faces, German signboards and placards alongside the Spanish. There is a large German school, a church and various Vereine, large shoe-factories, and, of course, breweries...

— Carl Skottsberg

The economic prosperity of Valdivia continued throughout the first half of the 20th century. In 1917, the first "Valdivian Week" (Spanish: Semana Valdiviana) was celebrated. Chile's oldest beauty contest, "Queen of The Rivers" (Spanish: Reina de Los Ríos) began the same year. The city evolved as an early tourist center in Chile, while popular songs that named Valdivia and the Calle-Calle River made it better known in Chilean popular culture. The Pedro de Valdivia Bridge crossing the Valdivia River was built in 1954. Valdivia came to be one of the most important industrial centers in Chile together with the capital Santiago and the main port city, Valparaíso.

The commercial and human flux Valdivia suffered two setbacks in the early 20th century, first the connection of Osorno by railroad to central Chile which meant that Valdivia lost the quality of being the port that connected Osorno to Central Chile. Later on 1911, the opening of the Panama Canal meant a decrease in ship traffic all over Chile since ships travelling from the north Atlantic to north Pacific no longer had to pass through the Straits of Magellan or visit any Chilean port.

=== Great Chilean earthquake and Los Lagos Region (1960–2006) ===
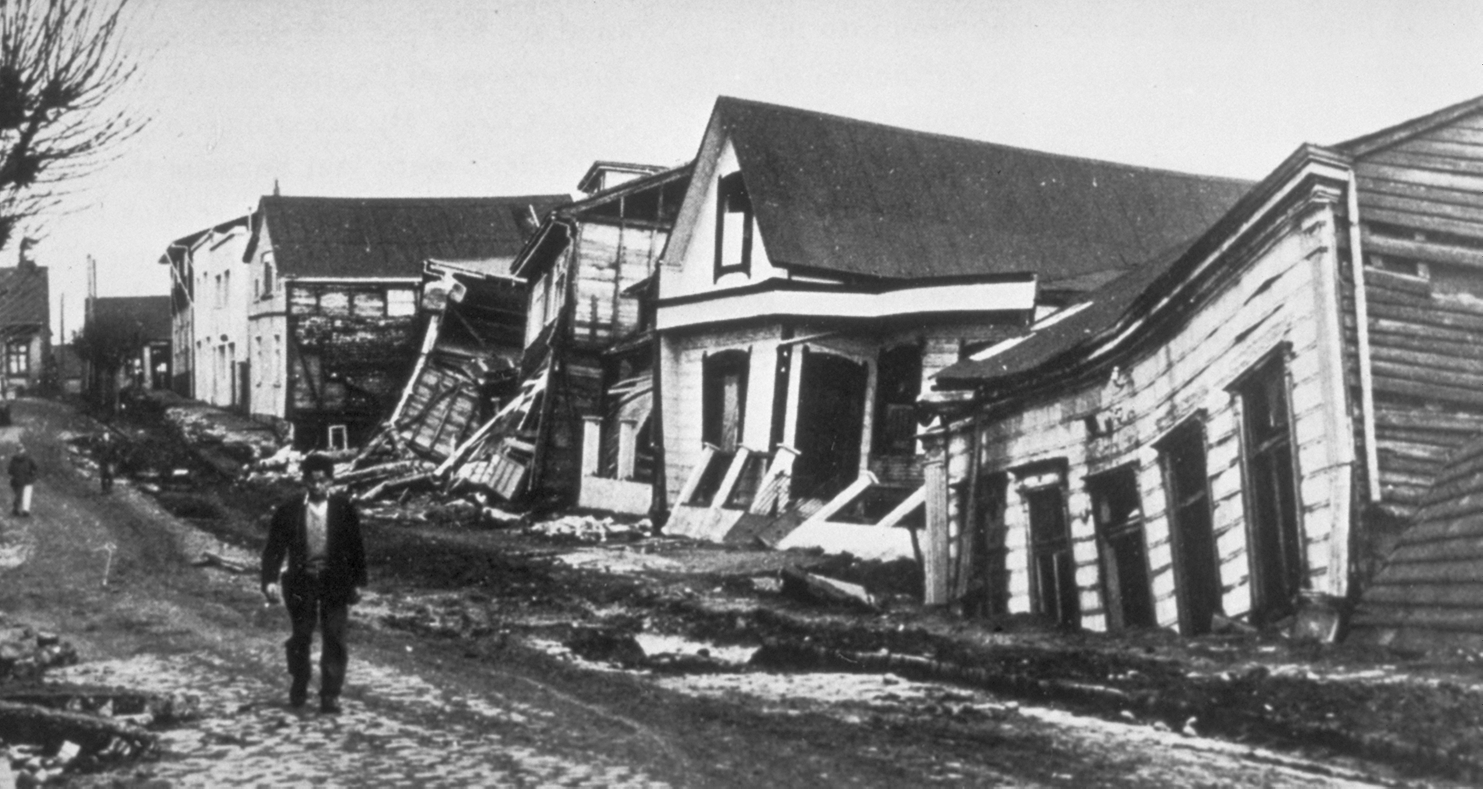
A street in Valdivia after the earthquake of 22 May 1960

On 22 May 1960, Chile suffered the most powerful earthquake ever recorded, rating 9.5 on the moment magnitude scale, with Valdivia being the most affected city. The earthquake generated devastating tsunamis that affected Japan, the Philippines, Australia, New Zealand, and Hawaii. Spanish-colonial forts around Valdivia were severely damaged, while soil subsidence destroyed buildings, deepened local rivers, and created wetlands of the Río Cruces y Chorocomayo – a new aquatic park north of the city.

Large sections of the city flooded after the earthquake, and a landslide near the Tralcán Mount dammed the Riñihue Lake. Water levels in Lake Riñihue rose more than 20 meters (66 feet), raising the danger of a catastrophic break and of destroying everything downriver. Government authorities drew plans for evacuating the city, but many people left on their own. Danger to the city was reduced after a large team of workers opened a drainage channel in the landslide; water levels of the lake slowly returned to normal levels. There is evidence that a similar landslide and earthquake happened in 1575. After the Great Chilean earthquake, Valdivia's economy and political status declined. Much of the city was destroyed and many inhabitants left.

The 1973 Chilean coup d'état and the military's actions that followed brought dozens of detainees to Valdivia and saw the imposing of a nationwide curfew. In October, a group of 12 young men, among them was José Gregorio Liendo, were brought from the Complejo Forestal y Maderero Panguipulli in the Andes to be executed in Valdivia by firing squad due to alleged participation in the assault on Neltume police station and "guerrilla activities".

By 1974, the military junta reorganized the political divisions of Chile and declared Valdivia a province of the Los Lagos Region with Puerto Montt as the regional capital. Many Valdivians resented the decision, and felt theirs should have been the legitimate regional capital—while Valdivia was founded in 1552, and had resisted pirate attacks, hostile natives and several earthquakes, Puerto Montt was a relatively new city founded only in 1853 (three hundred and one years later).

Since the liberalization of the economy in Chile in the 1980s, the forestry sector in Valdivia boomed, first by exporting wood chips to Japan from Corral and then by producing woodpulp in Mariquina (50 km northeast of Valdivia). This led to deforestation and substitution of native Valdivian temperate rainforests to plant pines and eucalyptus, but also created new jobs for people with limited education. Valdivia also benefitted from the development of salmon aquaculture in the 1990s, but to a much lesser extent than places such as Puerto Montt and Chiloé.

== Culture ==
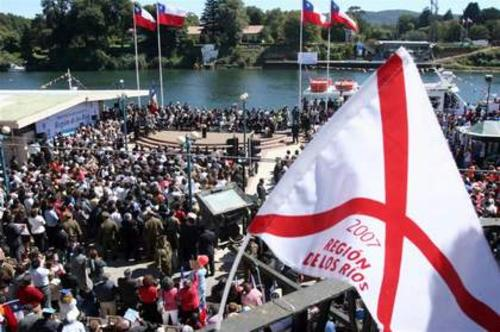
Michelle Bachelet's visit to Valdivia in 2007, in which she confirmed the creation of Los Ríos Region

Valdivia is often promoted for its unique characteristics, that make it different from other cities in Chile: Valdivia has an early Spanish colonial past, plus a later history of German colonization. Both eras left visible landmarks such as the forts of Corral Bay and the German-style wood houses. The governments of Spain and Germany currently maintain honorary consulates in Valdivia. The city is commonly seen as a tourist magnet in Chile, and sometimes described as La Perla del Sur (The Pearl of the South) and as La ciudad mas linda de Chile (Chile's most beautiful city). Every year during the summer months of January and February the municipality organizes many free cultural events along the river site, such as concerts, sporting events, and other entertainment. To mark and celebrate the end of the touristic summer months, halfway through February all entertainment reaches its climax with the celebration of noche Valdiviana (Valdivian night). During this night many local groups and communities present themselves on boats during a night parade over the river. Every boat has its own theme related with one theme of that year. At the end a jury picks the winners in different categories. The parade is by tradition started by a boat which presents la reina de los ríos. In recent years Valdivians have shown an increasing interest in nature and ecotourism. An example of this was the formation of Acción por los Cisnes an ecologist group formed to protect black-necked swans and the natural environment that surrounds the city, particularly wetlands created or expanded by the Great Chilean earthquake. With the founding of Universidad Austral in 1954 and the arrival of the CECS research center, Valdivia is now considered a major research center in Chile, particularly in areas related to nature such as glaciology and ecology. The Great Chilean earthquake and the national government's creation of the Los Lagos Region were difficult for Valdivian society. Valdivians resented to be punished first by a major earthquake and then by being placed under the administration of what they perceived to be a less-deserving city, Puerto Montt. The recent creation of a new, smaller, but more independent region (Los Ríos), with Valdivia as its capital, reduced the previous stigma.

Valdivia's varied influences are reflected by its multicultural toponyms that include placenames of Mapuche, Spanish, Quechua and German origin.

=== Spanish colonial influences ===
During much of the colonial period, Valdivia was essentially a military camp, a walled city surrounded by hostile natives. The coastal defenses and their garrisons made up a large part of the population. After several fires and earthquakes, nearly all buildings from this period were destroyed, with the exception of the military defenses. Valdivia's best known historical landmarks are now the two towers which were part of a former city wall, built by the Spaniards to defend the city, known as Torreones: Torreón Los Canelos and Torreón del Barro.

=== German influences ===
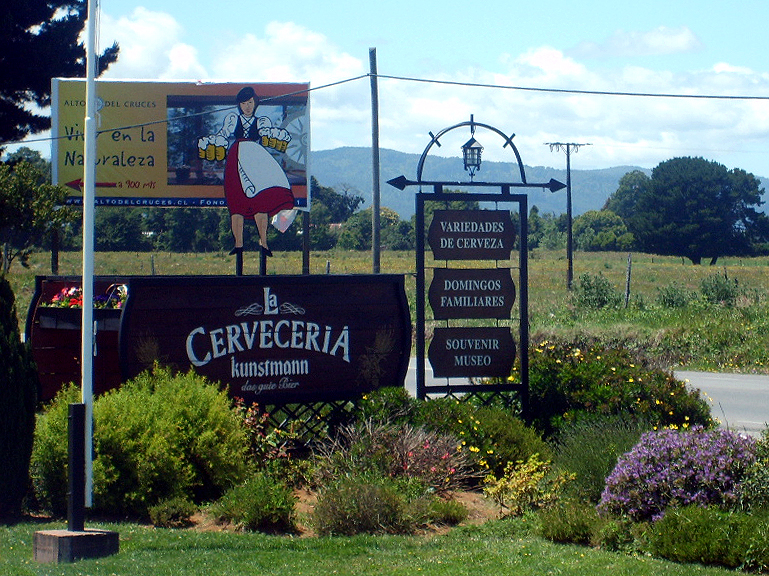
Kunstmann Brewery, Valdivia, Chile

Since the first Germans migrated to Valdivia in the mid-1840s, German cultural influence has been visible in the city. Germans in Valdivia settled mostly in the Isla Teja and Collico suburban areas. Until the building of Pedro de Valdivia Bridge, inhabitants of Isla Teja lived isolated from the city, where it was common that children first learned to speak German before Spanish. Nowadays, the German language is preserved by the Instituto Alemán Carlos Anwandter one of Latin America's oldest German schools. German descendants also form Valdivia's oldest fire station Germania, located in Isla Teja.

German immigrants and their descendants formed their social club Club Alemán, which after World War II changed names to Club la Unión. German workers once had their own club simply called El Alemán (The German).

Valdivia also hosts Bierfest Valdivia, a celebration that could be described as a small, regional Oktoberfest, despite being celebrated in late January or February of every year (during the local summer, when there is the largest influx of tourists). The main sponsor and organizer is Kunstmann, a local beer company, founded by German nationals, but since bought out by the largest beer and beverages company in Chile (CCU).

== Literature ==
The Valdivia Book Fair is organized annually by the Municipal Cultural Corporation in Parque Saval. Likewise, the Society of Writers of Chile, through its subsidiary Valdivia and with the collaboration of the Austral University of Chile, regularly holds literary gatherings, a space in which books are presented and local letters are shared with the student community. Several authors born in the Los Ríos Region also stand out in the city, such as Maha Vial, Iván Espinoza Riesco, José Baroja, Aldo Astete Cuadra, Efraín Miranda Cárdenas, among others.

== Demographics ==
Historical population
Year	Pop.	±% p.a.
1875	8,711	—
1885	10,340	+1.73%
1895	16,360	+4.70%
1907	24,703	+3.49%
1920	38,440	+3.46%
1930	48,018	+2.25%
1940	49,481	+0.30%
1952	62,363	+1.95%
1970	92,055	+2.19%
1982	109,387	+1.45%
1992	122,168	+1.11%
2002	140,559	+1.41%
2017	166,080	+1.12%
2024	182,086	+1.32%
Source: "Censo de Población y Vivienda". National Statistics Institute.

According to the 2002 census of the National Statistics Institute, the commune of Valdivia spans an area of 1,015.6 km^{2} (392 sq mi) and has 140,559 inhabitants (68,510 men and 72,049 women). Of these, 129,952 (92.5%) lived in urban areas and 10,607 (7.5%) in rural areas. Between the 1992 and 2002 censuses, the population grew by 15.1% (18,391 persons).

The city of Valdivia spans 42.39 km^{2} (16 sq mi) had a population of 127,750 and 35,217 homes, giving it a population density of 3,013.7/km^{2} (7,805/sq mi). The commune is divided into 19 census districts with one recognized town, Niebla, with an area of 1.55 square kilometers (0.60 sq mi), population of 2,202 (in 1,169 homes) and population density of 1,420.6/km^{2} (3,679/sq mi).

Within the population, the presence of descendants of migrants of German origin and of Spanish origin also stands out, colonies that are grouped into different social, educational, sports and cultural institutions.

=== Arts and Scientific research ===
The Southern University of Chile (Universidad Austral de Chile, UACh), one of the original eight Chilean state universities, has its main campus in Valdivia. In the last decade Valdivia gained prestige as an important cultural and scientific venue: the Valdivia Film Festival became the most important in Chile, and the Centro de Estudios Científicos (CECS) is now housed in the recently modernized, German-style hotel Schuster located by the Valdivia River. Claudio Bunster, a physicist and winner of Chile's National Prize in Exact Sciences, is the Director of CECS. Some research areas where CECS and UACH have gained widespread recognition include:

- Agronomy (UACh)
- Biophysics and molecular physiology (CECS)
- Ecology (UACh)
- Forestry (UACh)
- Glaciology (CECS)
- Physics (CECS)
- Veterinary (UACh)

The city is surrounded by many nature reserves and large areas of forest plantations, wetlands and Valdivian temperate rainforest that, together with the numerous rivers that circle the city, have heightened the residents' awareness of living close to nature.

=== Trivia ===
In addition to being known as the City of Rivers, Valdivia has also been called The pearl of the South, The key of the South seas, Gibraltar of the Pacific, and Chile's most beautiful city. The nickname Valdilluvia is a mix of the Spanish word for rain – lluvia and Valdivia referring to the rainy climate of the city.

== Geography ==
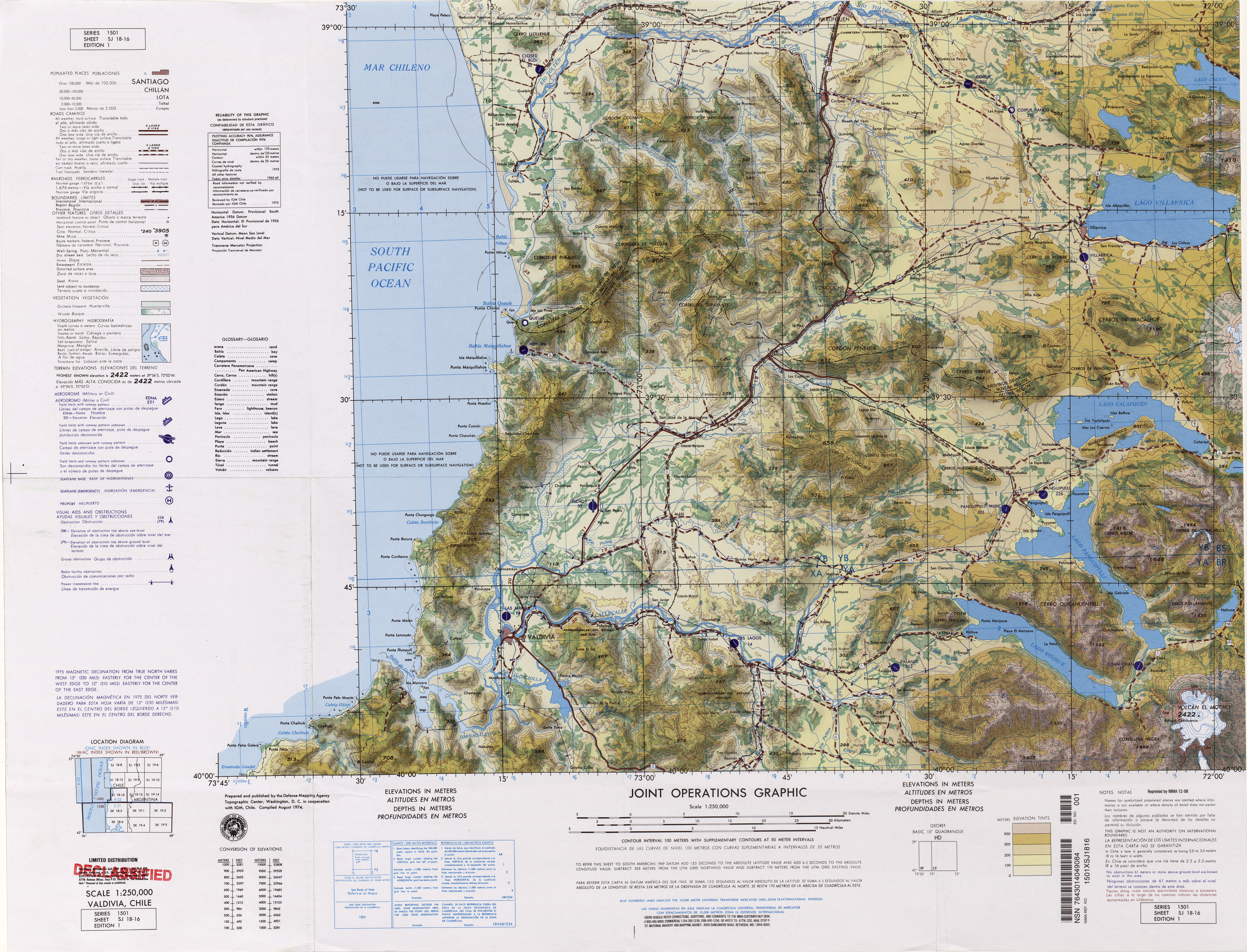
Map of Valdivia and its surroundings

As part of the Chilean Patagonia, the geography of the Valdivia area consists of wetlands and alluvial terraces. Several rivers, such as Cau-Cau, Calle-Calle and Cruces, join near the city forming the larger Valdivia River. Valdivia River in turn empties to Corral Bay in the Pacific Ocean just some 15 km west of Valdivia. This river network made Valdivia a trade center even since Pre-Hispanic times. The city itself was built on a riverine terrace but expanded later over adjacent wetlands. Nowadays the city is virtually surrounded by hills by all sides except north where Valdivia's lowlands connect to the flatlands of San José de la Mariquina. Some hilly areas around Valdivia are covered with exotic forest species such as Douglas-fir, Pinus radiata and Eucalyptus globulus. Other places are used for recreational purposes or conservation of native ecosystems. Additional Northern Hemisphere exotic trees such as birch, horsechestnut and poplar are common in residential areas. Palms are occasional.

Parts of city is built on poor soils made up of former wetlands or artificial fills that are prone to suffer during earthquakes as demonstrated in 1960 and 2010.

=== Geology ===
Within the context of plate tectonics, the city lies at a convergent margin where Nazca Plate, in the Pacific, is subducted beneath the South American Plate. Topographically Valdivia lies in a depression amidst the Chilean Coast Range. The basement rocks that crops out in the hills around the city are of metamorphic type. The city itself is chiefly built upon terraces made up of hardened volcanic sand. This volcanic sandstone is known as "cancagua" and deposited during the late Pleistocene epoch. As terraces took shape during the interglacial preceding the Llanquihue glaciation —the last glacial period— this interglacial is known in Chile as the Valdivia interglacial.

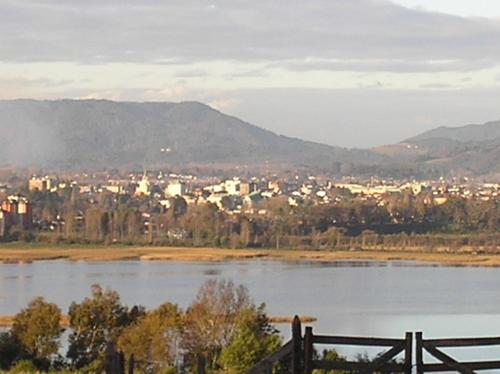
View of Valdivia from west

A tectonically and eustatically stable period during the Oligocene and Early Miocene allowed erosion to create deep valleys in the Coast Range and peat swamps at what is now the estuary of the Valdivia basin. About 23.5 million years ago this stable period was interrupted by a major volcanic eruption, and 23 million years ago an increase in convergence rate at the Peru–Chile Trench caused an uplift of the landscape and renewed erosion. However basin subsidence and a marine transgression formed deep embayments, tidal flats, bayhead deltas and beaches.

=== Climate ===
Valdivia has an oceanic climate (Köppen Cfb) bordering on a Mediterranean climate (Köppen Csb). The natural vegetation of the region is the Valdivian temperate rainforest.

During the summer months (December, January and February) the average temperature is about 17 °C (63 °F), while in winter the temperature descends to 8.5 °C (47.3 °F). The annual average temperature for Los Ríos Region is 11 °C (52 °F), while the mean temperature amplitude is 8.8 °C (47.8 °F) and the daily is 11 °C (51.8 °F). Average annual precipitation is 1,750 millimeters (70 in), distributed through the year, but primarily between March and October. Hail occurs with some frequency during winter, but snow falls rarely. The last times it snowed in Valdivia were in August 2020, July 2007, and in August 1995 during the so-called Terremoto Blanco (Spanish for White Earthquake). The Seven Lakes in the interior help to keep an average relative humidity of 80% for the region as whole and there are no months with less than 75% average humidity. The precipitation is generated by frontal systems that cross the zone, which produce cloudiness and few clear days. The leeward effect of the Valdivian Coast Range is minimal due to its low height (715 m at Cerro Oncol) and the gap in the range at Valdivia River's outflow to the Pacific Ocean.

Decreasing precipitation has caused the city's water supply in Calle-Calle River to be contaminated with saline water from the coast. The effects of saline water entering the water supply of Valdivia were particularly noticeable in March 2015 when there was a surge in complains about the taste of the water. The saltwater in the rivers near Valdivia during autumn is expected to increase in the future. Estimations indicate that whenever the sum of the water discharge of Cruces and Calle-Calle rivers falls below 74 m^{3}/s (2,600 cu ft/s) saltwater reaches the supply site at Cuesta Soto.

Climate data for Valdivia, Chile (Pichoy Airport) 1991–2020, extremes 1966–present
Month	Jan	Feb	Mar	Apr	May	Jun	Jul	Aug	Sep	Oct	Nov	Dec	Year
Record high °C (°F)	35.2 (95.4)	38.5 (101.3)	32.0 (89.6)	27.5 (81.5)	21.2 (70.2)	18.2 (64.8)	19.2 (66.6)	20.0 (68.0)	25.9 (78.6)	29.2 (84.6)	31.2 (88.2)	33.2 (91.8)	38.5 (101.3)
Mean daily maximum °C (°F)	24.0 (75.2)	24.1 (75.4)	21.5 (70.7)	17.0 (62.6)	13.5 (56.3)	11.0 (51.8)	10.8 (51.4)	12.4 (54.3)	14.8 (58.6)	16.9 (62.4)	19.2 (66.6)	21.8 (71.2)	17.3 (63.1)
Daily mean °C (°F)	16.4 (61.5)	16.3 (61.3)	14.5 (58.1)	11.7 (53.1)	9.8 (49.6)	8.0 (46.4)	7.4 (45.3)	8.3 (46.9)	9.4 (48.9)	11.1 (52.0)	13.0 (55.4)	15.0 (59.0)	11.7 (53.1)
Mean daily minimum °C (°F)	8.8 (47.8)	8.5 (47.3)	7.5 (45.5)	6.3 (43.3)	6.0 (42.8)	5.0 (41.0)	4.0 (39.2)	4.2 (39.6)	4.1 (39.4)	5.3 (41.5)	6.8 (44.2)	8.2 (46.8)	6.2 (43.2)
Record low °C (°F)	−0.7 (30.7)	−0.2 (31.6)	−1.9 (28.6)	−3.8 (25.2)	−6.0 (21.2)	−6.8 (19.8)	−7.2 (19.0)	−5.2 (22.6)	−5.0 (23.0)	−3.0 (26.6)	−1.4 (29.5)	0.0 (32.0)	−7.2 (19.0)
Average precipitation mm (inches)	40.5 (1.59)	39.1 (1.54)	68.0 (2.68)	125.0 (4.92)	231.5 (9.11)	329.3 (12.96)	265.0 (10.43)	241.8 (9.52)	123.4 (4.86)	107.3 (4.22)	84.7 (3.33)	66.8 (2.63)	1,722.4 (67.81)
Average precipitation days (≥ 1.0 mm)	4.7	4.7	7.1	10.5	14.7	18.8	17.0	16.8	12.0	11.9	8.7	7.1	134.1
Average relative humidity (%)	63	64	72	80	87	89	87	83	76	72	68	65	76
Mean monthly sunshine hours	295.8	259.7	211.2	127.9	71.6	46.8	70.6	100.3	151.0	194.6	219.3	262.7	2,011.5
Source 1: Dirección Meteorológica de Chile (humidity 1970–2000)
Source 2: NOAA (precipitation days 1991–2020)

== Government and politics ==
The commune of Valdivia is a third-level administrative division of Chile governed by a directly elected mayor (alcalde) and a municipal council (consejales). The city's current mayor is Carla Andrea Amtmann Fecci of the Democratic Revolution party. The prior mayor was Omar Sabat Guzmán of the Independiente UDI.

Within the electoral divisions of Chile, Valdivia is represented in the Chamber of Deputies by Alfonso De Urresti (PS) and Roberto Delmastro (RN) as part of the 53rd electoral district, together with Lanco, Mariquina, Máfil and Corral. The commune is represented in the Senate during the 2014–2022 period by Alfonso de Urresti (PS) and Ena von Baer (UDI) as part of the 16th senatorial constituency (Los Ríos Region).

The creation of Los Ríos Region and environmental issues have dominated the political scene of Valdivia in recent years. The communist lawyer Wladimir Riesco headed the legal actions against pulp mill enterprise CELCO after the deaths of black-necked swans in Carlos Anwandter Nature Sanctuary in 2004.

=== Ecological action ===
In response to the alleged contamination of Cruces River by the Celco cellulose pulp mill, a group of citizens formed the Accion por los Cisnes (Action for the Swans) ecology group. Action for the Swans attracted the attention of the national newspapers and succeeded in temporarily closing down Valdivia Pulp Mill through a court order.

== Economy and tourism ==
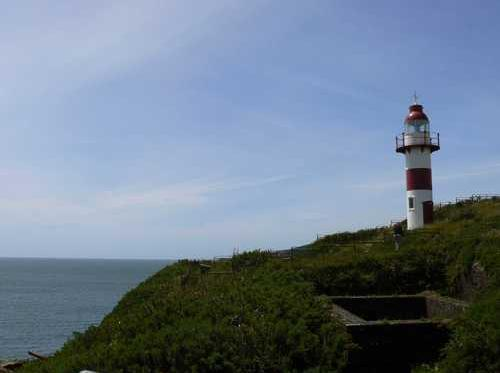
Niebla lighthouse situated just above the Niebla fort

The city and commune of Valdivia rely heavily on silviculture, the pulp and paper industry and other forestry-related activities (the harvesting and processing of wood from nearby plantations of eucalyptus and Douglas firs). Large businesses such as CELCO, Bomasil and Louisiana-Pacific have established wood processing factories near Valdivia. Metallurgy, naval construction and repairs are also important industries, with the companies of Asenav shipyard and Alwoplast based in the area. Agroforestry/agriculture, livestock, aquaculture and food processing are lesser but also important industries that contribute to the region's economy. The chocolate company (Entrelagos) contributes to the image of the region, as does the brewing industry, a symbol of the area and another important part of the local economy, with Kunstmann the most famous brewery in Valdivia. Beer, along with cold cut meat and sausages, is part of the city's German heritage and is preserved as part of the local heritage. Trade, restaurants and hotels link to the tourism industry which represent an important part in Valdivia's growing economy.

=== Tourism ===
Valdivia is a historic tourist destination in Chile, valued for the beauty of the city and surrounding areas, the area's culture and its history. It is an all season city, but during the summer months in particular (December, January, February) tourism is a major source of income for Valdivia's economy. "Valdivian Week" (Spanish: Semana Valdiviana), as it has been known since 1917, is a long-held tradition that dates back to the foundation of the city. Starting 9 February each year, it commemorates the city's anniversary and also gives Valdivia the chance to promote itself as a tourism center. "Semana Valdiviana" features an allegorical parade of ships – a tradition that began in the seventeenth century as a protest against the Spaniard authorities – and also includes a big artisan market, fairground rides, and the election of the "queen" of Los Rios. The week ends with fireworks and theatre performances on the closing night, known as "Noche Valdiviana" (Valdivian Night). The center of the city has a rich architectural heritage. One of its most visited buildings is the "Mercado Municipal" ("municipal market"), a local produce market that is also now a gastronomic and cultural attraction. Also popular are the "Convento San Francisco" (Saint Francis Convent) and the European-style buildings dating back to the beginning of the 20th century, used today by the city's universities, cultural centers and government.

== International Relations ==
The city of Valdivia hosts a number of international relations institutions, such as the Regional Unit of International Affairs (URAI) of the Regional Government of Los Ríos, responsible for analyzing and managing the region’s bilateral and multilateral relations with Latin America and the rest of the world, as well as organizing international events such as the Los Ríos International Meeting, which annually gathers Embassies and foreign institutions in the city; the Regional Unit for Investment Promotion and Attraction; the International Relations Commission of the Regional Council of Los Ríos; the International Relations Unit of the Regional Corporation for Productive Development; the regional office of the National Migration Service; the regional office of the General Directorate for Export Promotion (ProChile); the Department of Migration and International Police of the Investigations Police; and the Migrant Office of the Municipality of Valdivia. In the field of higher education internationalization, the main actor in Valdivia is the International Relations Unit of the Austral University of Chile.

=== Consulates ===
Due to the significant number of immigrants and descendants from various European countries (especially Germans), the city hosts several honorary consulates that address different issues affecting the local resident population. The consulates present in the city are:

- Germany: Honorarkonsul der Bundesrepublik Deutschland (Honorary Consul: Kurt Hellemann).
- Austria: Honorary Consulate of Austria (Honorary Consul: Dr. Marcos Iampaglia).
- Spain: Honorary Consulate of the Kingdom of Spain (Honorary Consul: Elías Caballero).
- France: Consulat Honoraire de la République Française (Honorary Consul: Carl Friedrich Fingerhuth Vorwerk).
- Italy: Honorary Consulate of the Italian Republic (Honorary Consul: Alessandro Foradori).
- Netherlands: Honorary Consulate of the Netherlands (Honorary Consul: Charlotte Lovengreen Van Der Meijden).
- United Kingdom: Honorary Consulate of the United Kingdom (Honorary Consul: John Kenyon).

== Education ==
=== Universities and colleges ===
Valdivia is home to several public and private schools and universities. The largest and oldest university is the Universidad Austral de Chile (UACh) that was founded by decree in 1954 as one of Chile's seven original Chilean Traditional Universities. Its main campus is located in Isla Teja but it has other minor campus and properties spread through the city and southern Chile. Since the liberalization of higher education in Chile in the 1980s other universities have established campuses in Valdivia, including Universidad Arturo Prat, Universidad San Sebastián, Universidad Santo Tomás and Universidad de Los Lagos.

=== Schools ===
Like in the rest of Chile, most of Valdivia's best schools are private. Instituto Alemán Carlos Anwandter (Deutsche Schule Valdivia) founded in 1858 is Chile's second oldest German school after the Instituto Alemán de Osorno (1854). Other notable private schools are Windsor School and Colegio San Luis de Alba. Among public schools Instituto Salesiano de Valdivia, Liceo Rector Armando Robles Rivera and Liceo Comercial have reached good results.

== Sports ==
Facilities for playing football, tennis, rowing, rugby, golf, indoor swimming, indoor and outdoor basketball and some other sports are available throughout the area. Rowing is practiced in Valdivia in three clubs: Club Deportivo Phoenix Valdivia, Club Centenario de Remeros and Club Arturo Prat. Valdivian rowers Cristian Yantani and Miguel Cerda won the first place in Men's Lightweight Coxless Pair-Oared Shells at the world championship in Seville, 2002.

Club Deportivo Valdivia is Valdivia's main basketball team and plays in Chiles first division, DIMAYOR where it won the 2001 season. In 1977 and 2001 Valdivia hosted South Americas Men's Basketball Championship.

The football club Club Deportivo Deportes Valdivia, founded in 2003, plays currently in the Chilean third division and as of 2013, will play in the Primera B (or Second Division)

== Transport ==
=== Roads and bridges ===
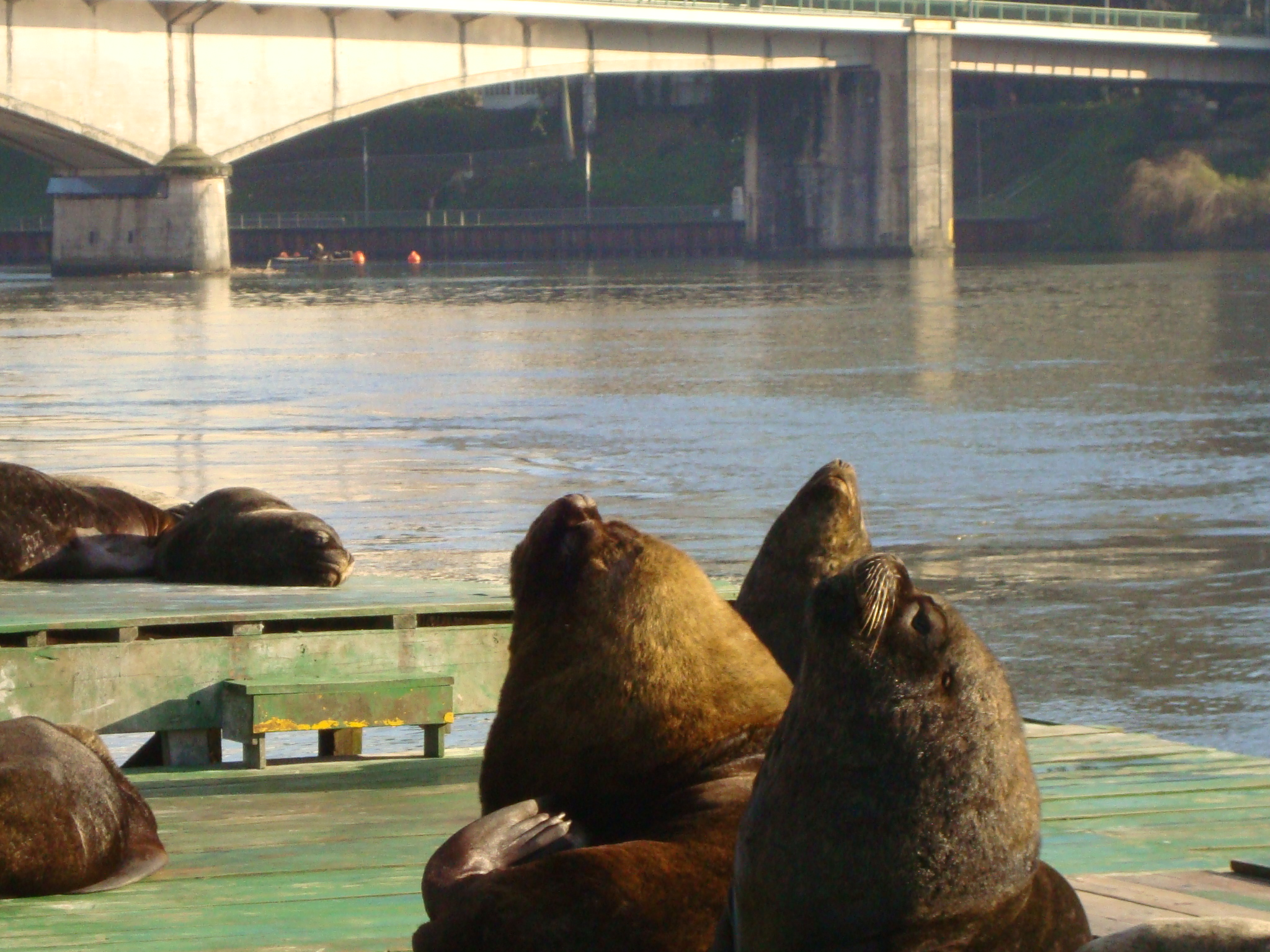
Pedro de Valdivia Bridge and the city's sea lion colony

Most of Valdivia lies on the southern side of the Valdivia and Calle-Calle Rivers but other areas of the city, such as Isla Teja and Las Animas, are connected to it by bridges. The main access points to the city are Calle-Calle Bridge from the north and a southern route. Both connect the city with the Pan-American Highway and run through forested areas and wetlands. Route 207 runs from Valdivia southeast connecting the city with the town of Paillaco at the Route 5.

Calle-Calle Bridge, the first bridge built in the city, connects Valdivia with Las Animas and forms the northern highway access to the city. Pedro de Valdivia Bridge was built in 1954 and connects the city with Isla Teja, where many German immigrants once lived. During the Great 1960 Valdivia earthquake only the minor Caucau Bridge (connecting Las Animas with Isla Teja) was destroyed, while all other bridges were repaired and are still in use. In 1987 Augusto Pinochet opened Río Cruces Bridge, making the coastal town of Niebla as well as Torobayo and Punucapa accessible by road. Calle-Calle Bridge, the main access to the city, was enlarged in the 1990s.

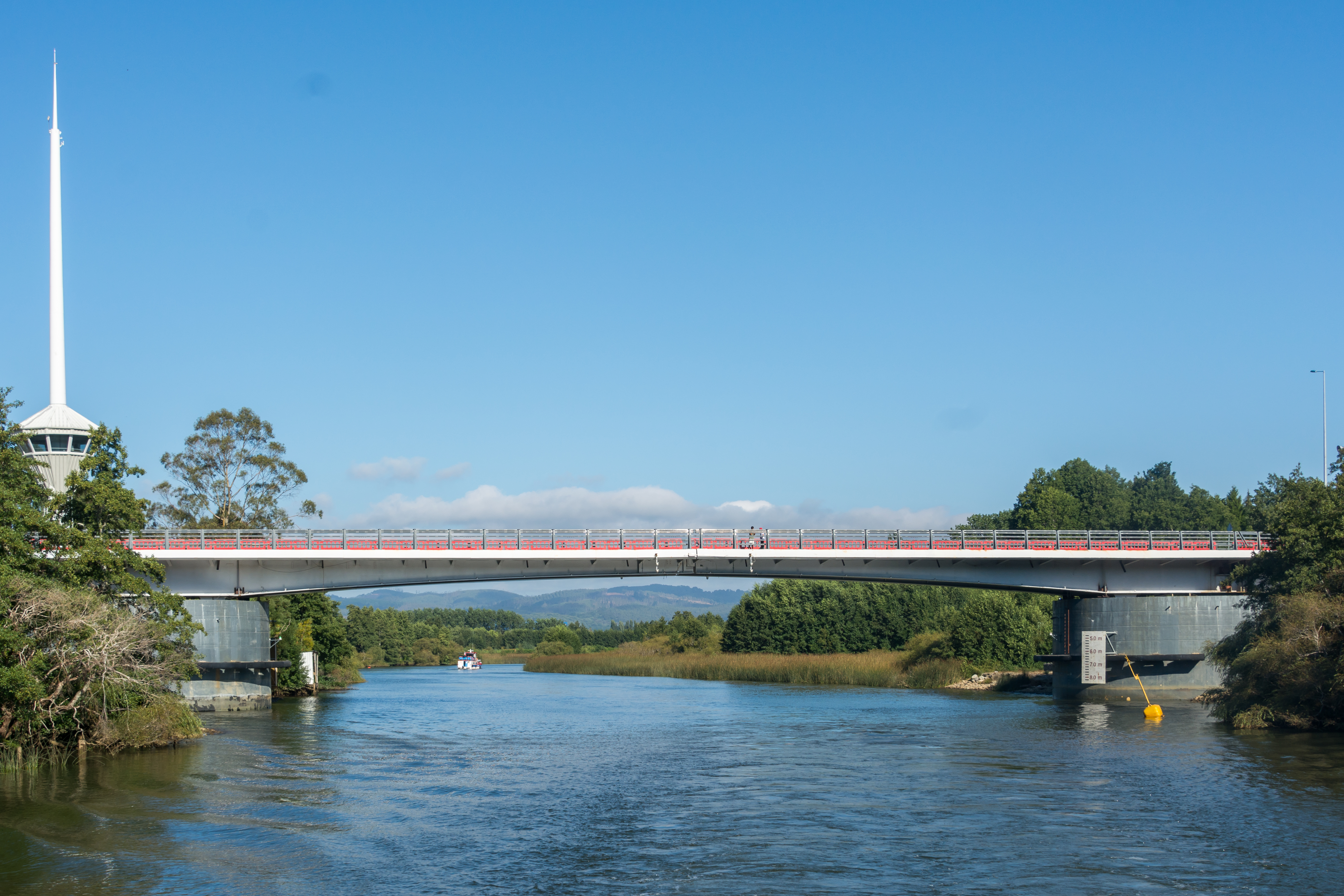
The New Cau Cau bridge in Valdivia has been restored and fixed.

The new Caucau bridge was intended to provide a faster route from the city centre to the Pichoy airport via Isla Teja, but the faulty construction made it unusable, till repairs were enacted in the late 2010s, early 2020s.

=== Waterways ===
Until highway bridges were built, Valdivia's economy and citizens depended on boat traffic on the surrounding rivers, but with a contraction of bridges and highways, the river has lost its importance. Today, the rivers are used by the commercial ships built or repaired in Asenav, one of Chile's most important shipyard companies, and by tourist boats. Some of the locations that are regularly reached by tourist boats include Mancera Island and Punucapa. Fishing boats also travel inland from the coast to the River Market. Today, just one ferry is still in operation, the Niebla–Corral line, as it is much quicker to reach Corral by ferry than by road.

Although in recent years the rivers have not had a major role in Valdivia's public transportation, a new private project is being developed by "Los Solares", an environmentally friendly company that operates solar-powered river taxis on Valdivia River. The project is called Transporte Fluvial Sustentable (TFS, or "Sustainable Water Transportation" in English). So far, the company has a fleet of three river taxis, and a small, sustainable and locally designed floating village that includes a pier, a café and the company's offices. The community produces its own electricity, water supply and processes its own wastewater with a bacterial solution.

=== Airports ===
The city is served mainly by Pichoy Airport, lying 32 km northeast of the city via the north entrance road that connects the city with the Pan American Highway. The smaller but much closer Las Marías Airport is used primarily by small aircraft, with no airlines operating there.

== Twin towns – sister cities ==
Country	City	State / Region	Since
Argentina	Neuquén	Neuquén Province	2003
Romania	Cluj-Napoca	Cluj County	2009
United States	Mount Pleasant	Michigan	
Australia	Hobart	Tasmania	
Germany	Hamburg	Hamburg	
Spain	Ateca	Aragon	

== Gallery ==
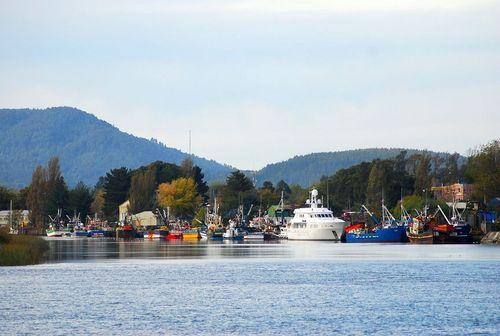
Haverbeck Canal

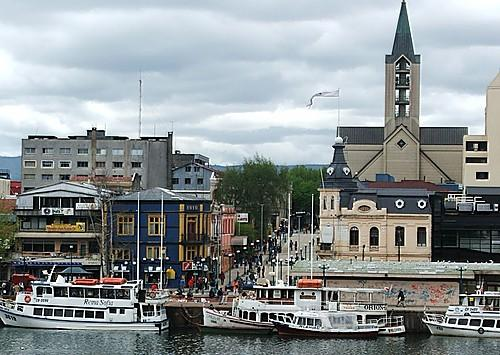
Libertad Walk & Valdivia cathedral

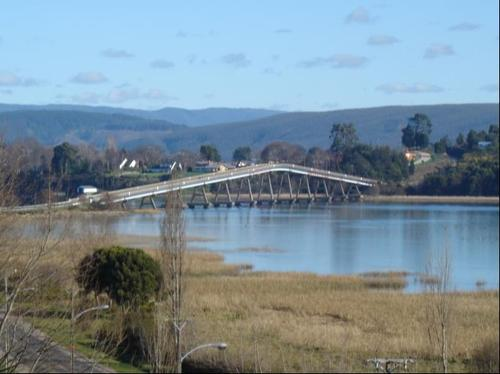
Isla Teja and Torobayo connected by the Río Cruces Bridge

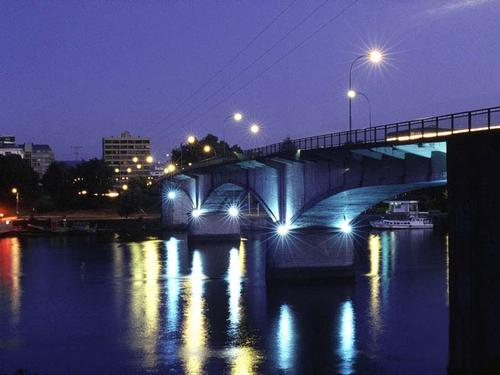
Pedro de Valdivia Bridge

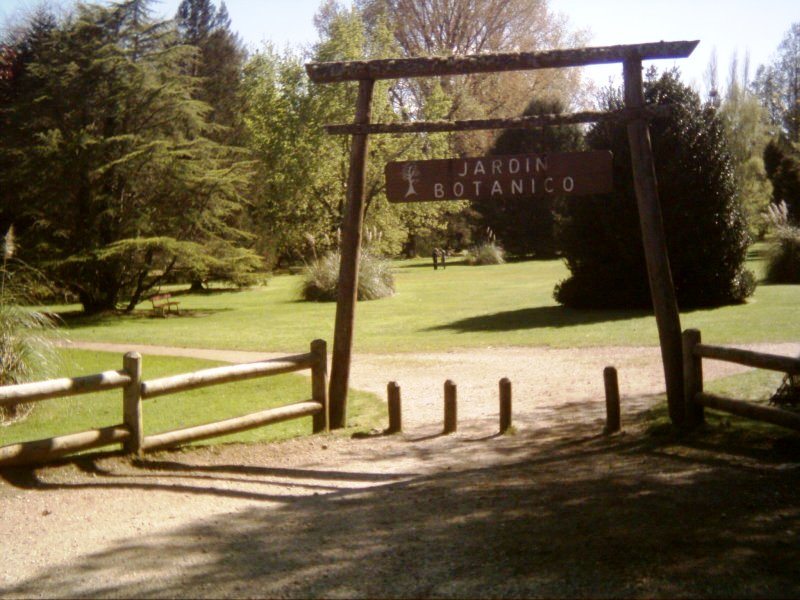
UACh Botanical Garden

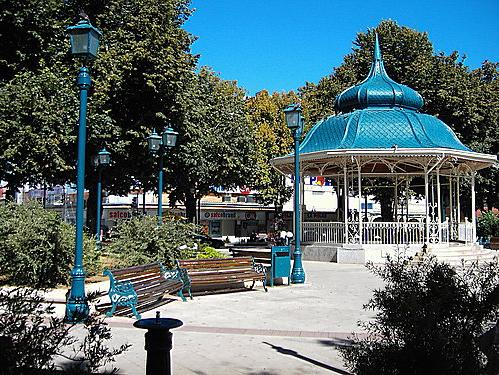
Plaza de la República

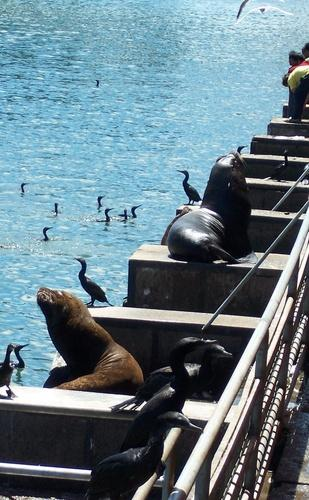
Sea lions by the riverside market

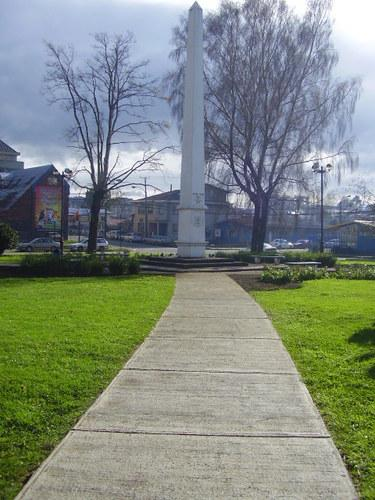
An obelisk

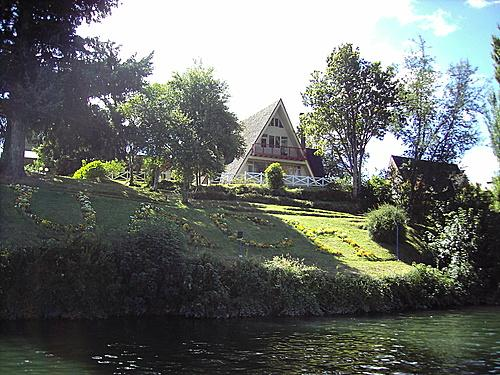
Universidad Austral de Chile housing

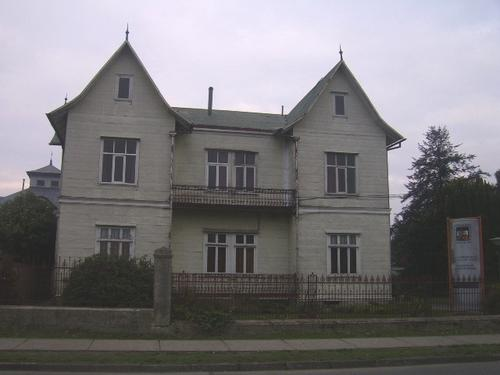
A German-styled house on General Lagos Street

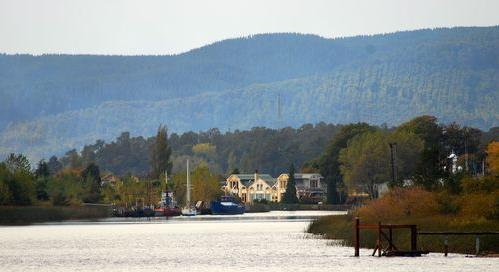
Haverbeck Canal of the Valdivia River

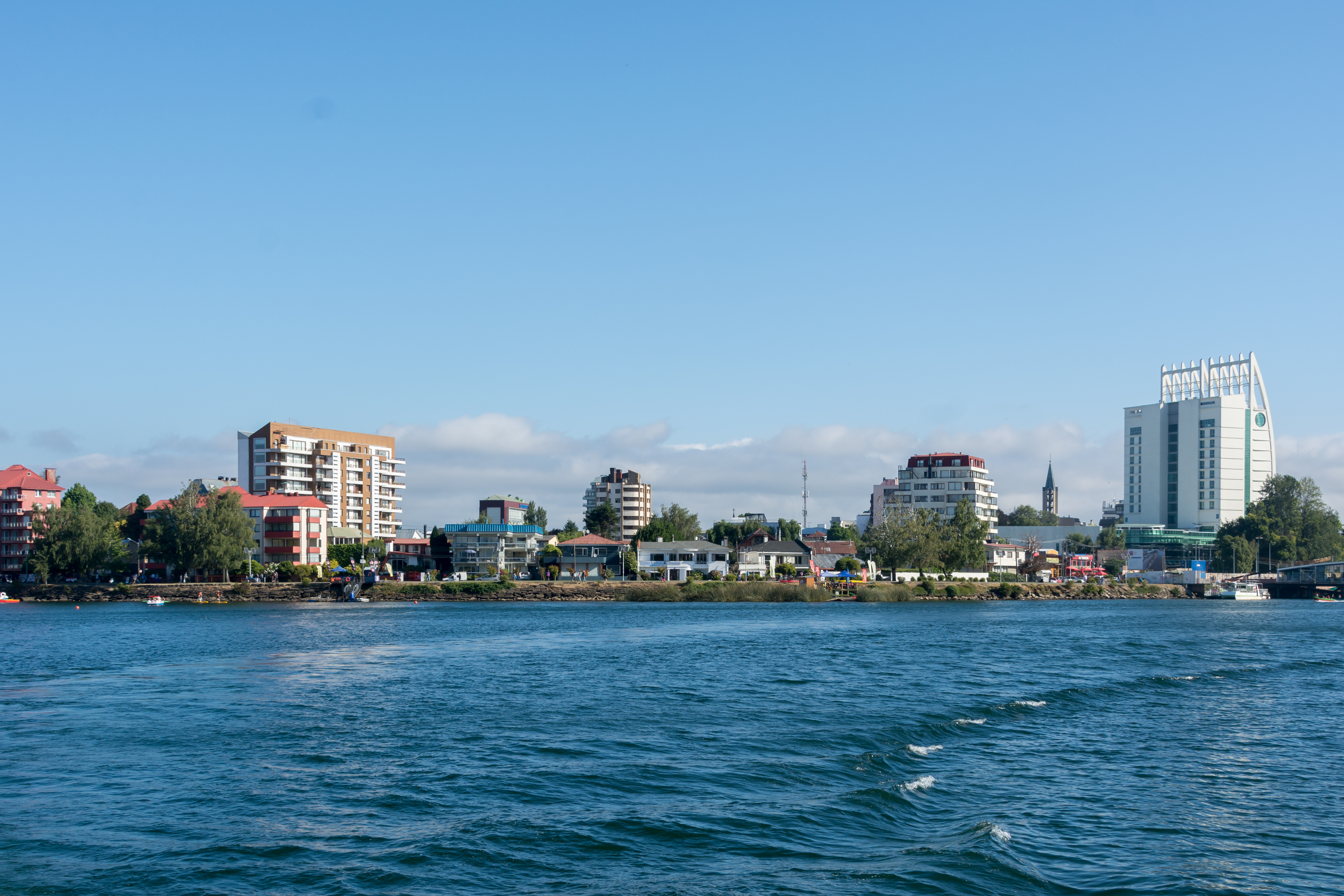
Valdivia, Chile

== See also ==
- Ecotourism in the Valdivian Temperate Rainforest
- Flag of Valdivia
- Iglesia San Francisco de Valdivia
- Pilolcura
- Punucapa
- Valdivian Coastal Reserve
