= Franz Kindermann =

German merchant

Franz Christoph Kindermann

Franz Christoph Kindermann or Francisco Kindermann was a German merchant active in Chile, known for his role in the German colonization of Valdivia, Osorno and Llanquihue and his participation in Sociedad Stuttgart that came into conflict with indigenous Huilliches.

== See also ==
- German-Chilean
- Bernhard Eunom Philippi
- Vicente Pérez Rosales
