= Kunstmann =

Chilean brewery

Coordinates: 39.837°S 73.2782°W

Compañia Cervecera Kunstmann S.A.
- Company type: Sociedad anónima
- Industry: Alcoholic Drinks
- Predecessor: Sociedad Cervecera Valdivia Ltda.
- Founded: 1997, in Valdivia, Chile
- Area served: Chile, South America, North America, Europe
- Products: Kunstmann Torobayo
- Website: www.cerveza-kunstmann.cl

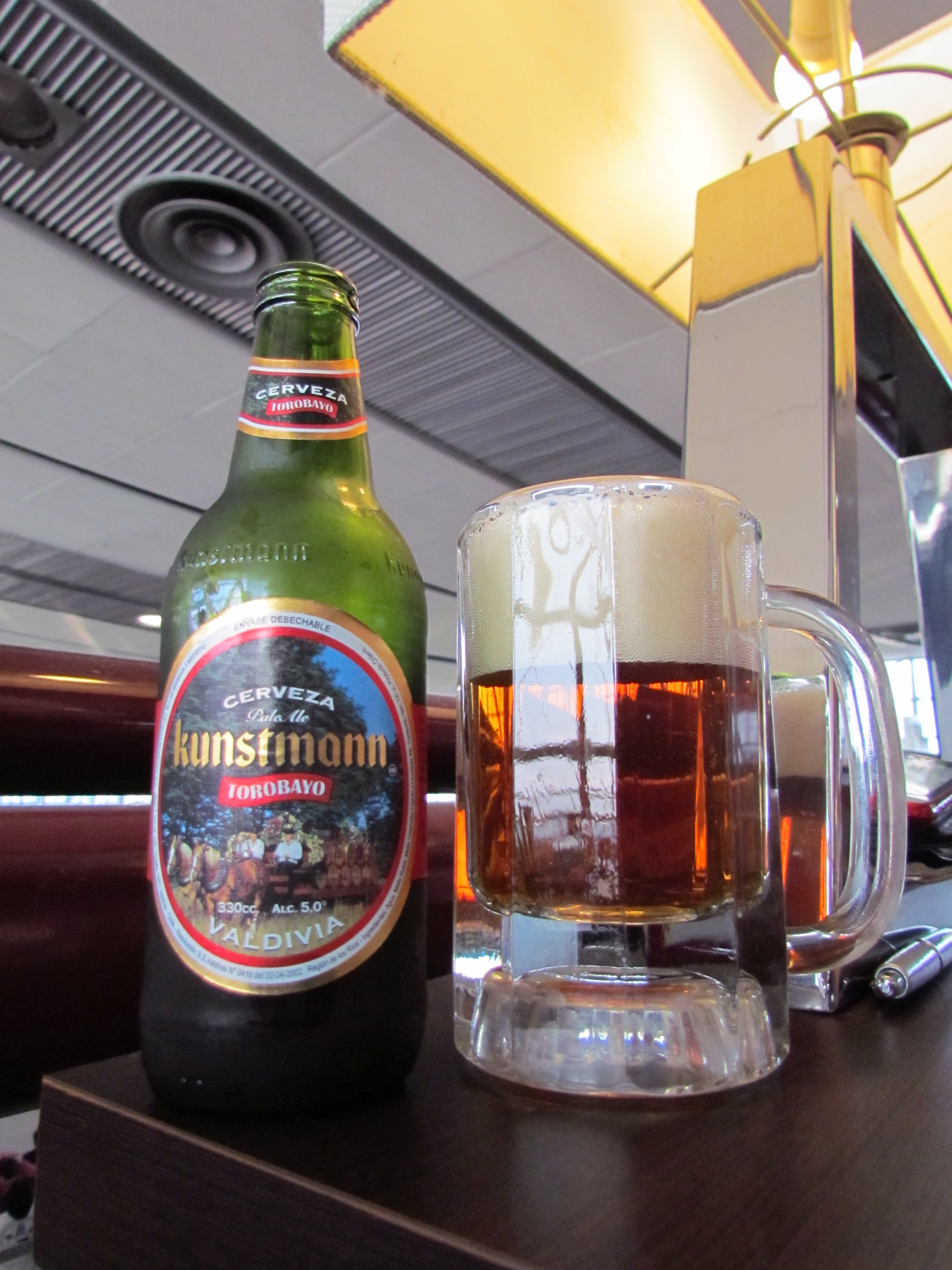
Kunstmann Torobayo

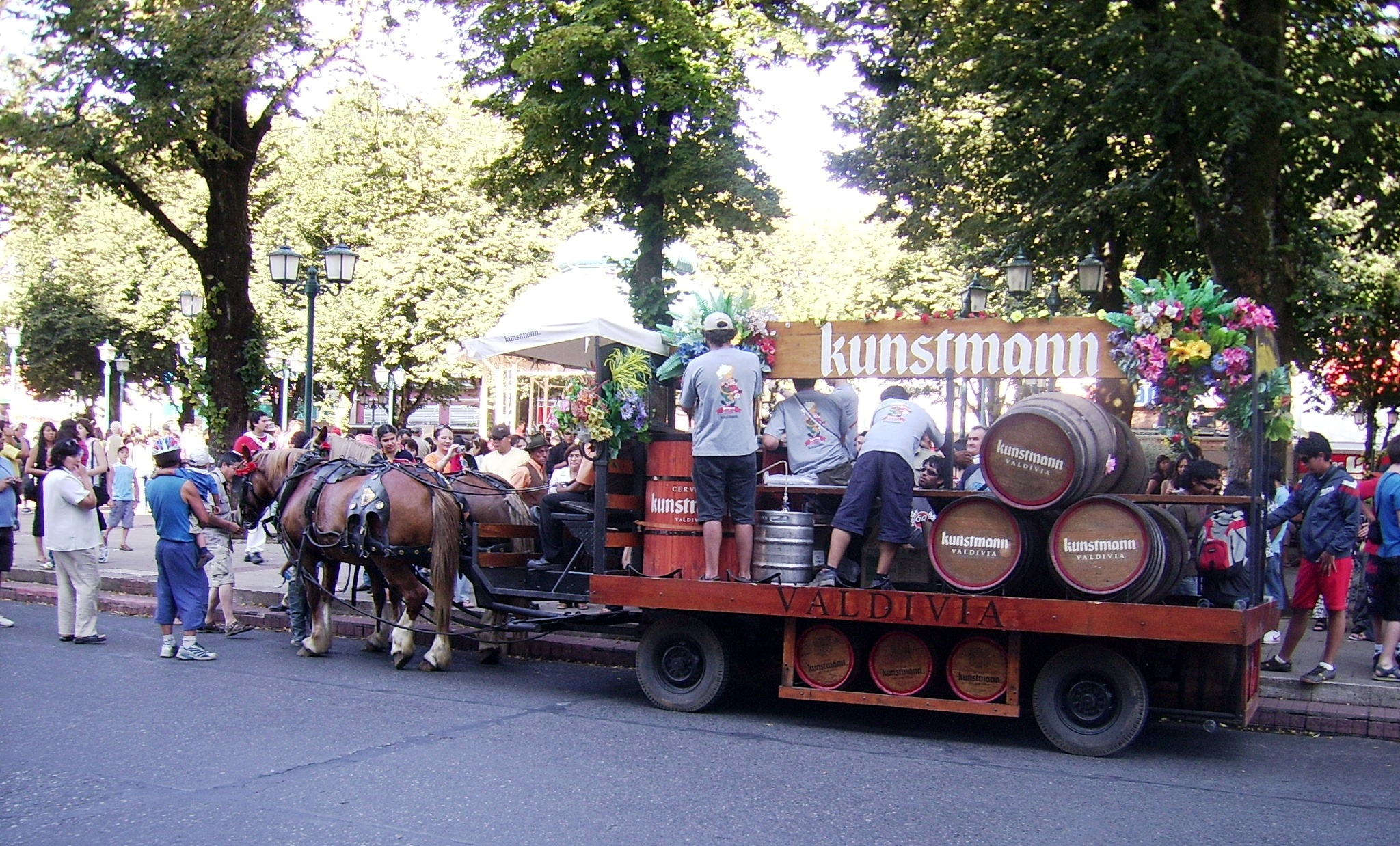
Beer-cart used during the Kunstmann Bierfest in Valdivia, Chile

Kunstmann is a Chilean beer brand produced in Torobayo, Valdivia by Compañia Cervecera Kunstmann S.A. Its current CEO is Armin Kunstmann.

== Ingredients ==
Kunstmann claims to brew its beers according to the precepts of the Reinheitsgebot (using malts/barley, water, hops and yeast). The geographical location of their main factory, allows the usage of clean natural water.

== Historical Background ==
Beer production in Valdivia dates from the early years of the German colonisation in southern Chile with Carlos Anwandter and his family being the first brewers in the area, after the opening of the Cerveceria Anwandter in 1851; such company was destroyed by the 1960 Valdivia earthquake.

By the late 1980s and early 1990s, the German-Chilean Kunstmann family decides to start experimenting with the production of beer at home, managing some moderate success with neighbors and family. In 1997, the production process is moved out of the family home in Valdivia and a small restaurant and factory was opened on the outskirts of the city in Torobayo called "La Cerveceria", thus creating the Sociedad Cervecera Valdivia Ltda which was founded by members of the Kunstmann Family.

=== Expansion ===
In 1998, the brand starts its expansion plan to markets abroad with the first shipments to Germany and the United States, followed by the entrance to the Japanese market in 2001. Up until 2002, all international exported products carried the "Patagonia" brand name but in an effort to unify their brand image and recognition, the Patagonia name is discarded and since then, all products carry the Kunstmann brand name.

By 2003, Kunstmann had already managed to grab 0.5% of the Chilean beer market, producing up to 20.000hl of beer per month. That same year, in May 10 Kunstmann closes a distribution and advertising deal with Compañia de Cervecerias Unidas (United Brewing Company) which acquired a 49% stake, creating the current Compañia Cervecera Kunstmann S.A.

== Commercialization ==
Kunstmann has created a brand name and image which is strongly associated with German tradition by virtue of their idea of preserving the cultural elements brought in by the German settlers in Southern Chile. One of those elements, was the creation and management of a beer festival (modeled on the style of the Oktoberfest) called "Bierfest Kunstmann". Since 2002, it gathers crowds from all over Chile and abroad. Such event takes place during the summer months each year (normally by the end of January, early February).

In 2017, a brand restructuring process resulted in the creation of a new beer bar and restaurant concept called "Kunstmann Kneipe" catering to a more casual young adult professional segment. By 2019/2020 however they got re-branded as "Kunstmann Craft Bar".

== Product lines ==
As part of their brand strategy, Kunstmann has created a diversified portfolio of products. Each one, catering to a specific demography or type of consumer. Their current offerings can be classified by product families.

=== Pioneras (Pioneers) ===
- Kunstmann Lager: Lager-styled beer with a golden/yellow-ish clear color. The first historical variety in production by the company.
- Kunstmann Torobayo: Pale-Ale styled beer with a red-ish/copper color.
- Kunstmann Bock: A strong-lager styled beer with a dark brown color.

=== Especialidades (Specialty Beers) ===
- Kunstmann Session IPA: A mildly bitter beer, modeled after the IPA style but with a lower level of bitterness
- Kunstmann Weißbier (Wheat): An un-filtered, darken golden beer made with wheat extract.
- Kunstmann Heidelbeere (Blueberry): Amber, Pale-Ale styled beer sweetened with blueberries
- Kunstmann HonigAle (Honey): Golden, yellow-ish colored beer, sweetened with Ulmo honey
- Kunstmann Lager Alkoholfrei (Non-alcoholic)
- Kunstmann Lager Unfiltriert (Unfiltered): An un-filtered variant of Kunstmann Lager.

=== Temporada (Seasonal Beers) ===
- Kunstmann Schokolade: Available during the May to October season, it is made with chocolate-covered barley
- Kunstmann Sommer Pils: Available during the December to March season. A Pilsner-styled beer.

=== Coleccion del Maestro. (Brewmaster's Collection) ===
- Kunstmann Gran Torobayo: A recipe variant of Kunstmann Torobayo but with a higher alcohol level and an extended fermentation process.
- Kunstmann Gran Lager: A recipe variant of Kunstmann Lager following the same pattern as Kunstmann Gran Torobayo
- Kunstmann Original Anwandter Rezept: A replica beer, using a modern formulation based on the type of products made by the Anwandter Brewery
- Kunstmann Doppelbock: A recipe variant of Kunstmann Bock but with an extended fermentation period and higher alcohol levels.

=== Ediciones Especiales (Special Editions) ===
- Kunstmann "Torobayo Sin Filtrar": An un-filtered recipe variant of Kunstmann Torobayo, made in 2016 during the 500th Anniversary of the Reinheitsgebot. Available in limited quantities on bottled editions and in their restaurants.

=== Ediciones Experimentales (Experimental Editions) ===
- Delirio del Maestro Cervecero: Limited-run beers, made once every 2 months with varied recipes. Only available for consumption on their restaurants.
