= Pichi Juan =

Pichi Juan, also called Juanillo was an indigenous Huilliche known for burning the Chan Chan forest in Southern Chile in 1851. On the orders of colonization agent Vicente Pérez Rosales, who whished to clear land for German settlers, Pichi Juan proceeded to set the Chan Chan forest afire at multiple locations.

According to Pérez Rosales Pichi Juan barely escaped death by hiding inside the trunk of a Nothofagus dombeyi.
