= Salpul =

Salpul (also called Salpu and Juan Salpú) was a northern, or guennekenk, Tehuelche leader in the late 19th century in Patagonia, Argentina. He allied with the tribes of Sayhueque, Inacayal, and Foyel (the last Patagonian indigenous chieftains who refused to recognize the Argentine government). They fought against the Argentine Army during the Conquest of the Desert.

In 1897, Salpul and a shaman named Cayupil (Caypül) tried to organize an uprising against the government. Their activities were quickly discovered by the authorities. Salpul was arrested and taken to Buenos Aires, but he was released within a month and returned home. Afterward he allied his people with the tribe of his relative Juan Sacamata. Between the 1890s and 1900, both lived in Nueva Lubecka, located in the Genoa Valley, Chubut province. Salpul died some years later in Pastos Blancos, near the Senguerr river.
