= Casimiro Biguá =

19th-century indigenous leader from Patagonia

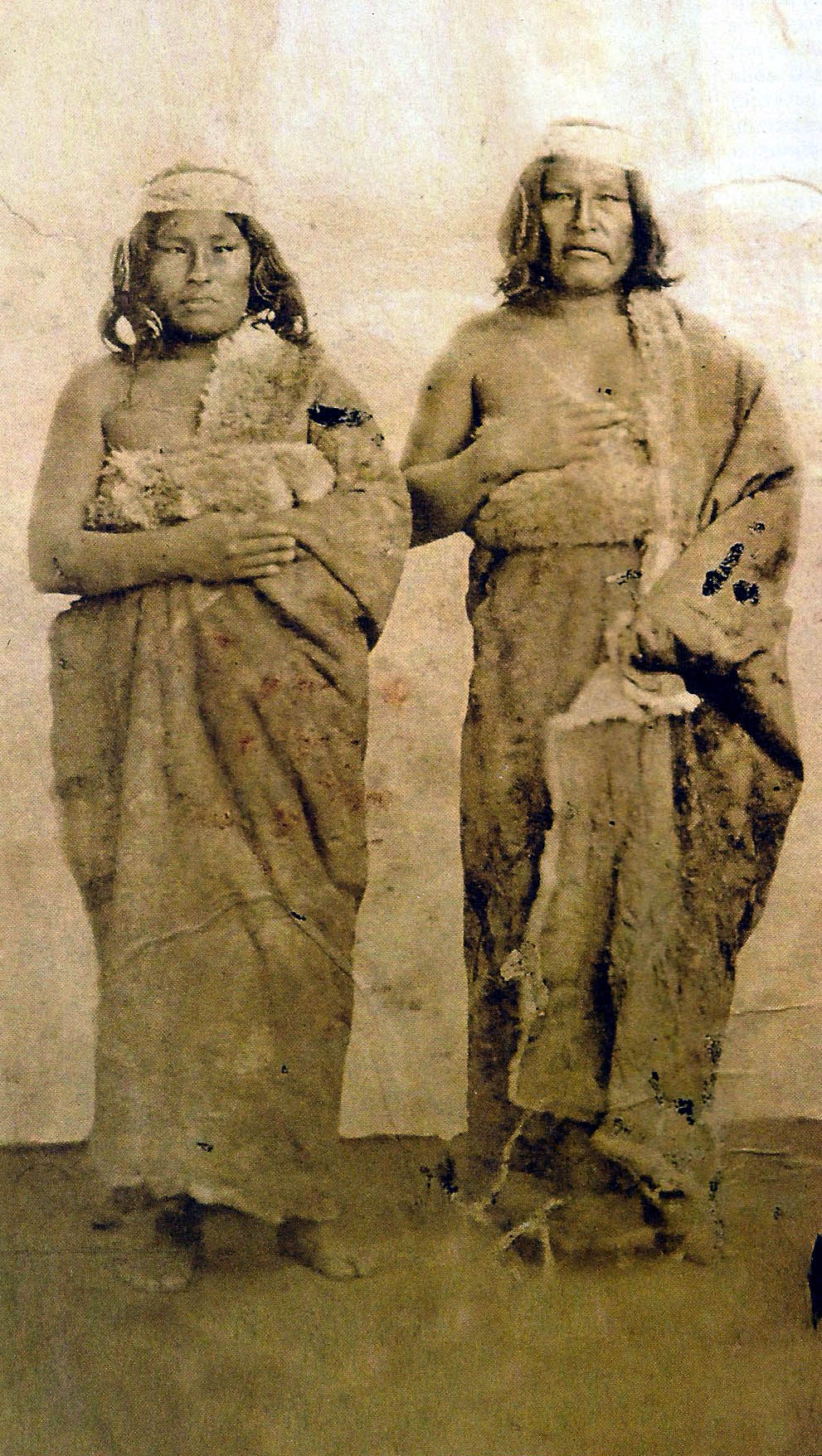
- The Tehuelche cacique Casimiro (right) and his son

Cacique of the southern Tehuelche people from the Strait of Magellan and the Patagonian coast
- Predecessor: María la Grande
- Died: Patagonia
- Mother: María la Grande

Casimiro Biguá was a 19th-century Tehuelche cacique in Patagonia. He opposed the Chilean colonization of the Strait of Magellan and in the 1860s he entered an alliance with Argentine authorities. In a bid to establish Argentine sovereignty over the strait Argentine "ad-hoc agent" Luis Piedra Buena brought Biguá to Buenos Aires where met President Bartolomé Mitre and was declared lieutenant colonel of the Argentine Army and granted a salary accordingly. In 1866 he signed a treaty with Argentine authorities where the Tehuelche were recognized as Argentine citizens and Argentine sovereignty up to the strait of Magellan was declared. The influence of Casimiro Biguá in political affairs declined in the late 1860s.

=== Relationship with the Chilean state and Anglican missions ===
Following the founding of Fuerte Bulnes—which marked Chile’s taking possession of the Strait of Magellan in 1843—and the subsequent relocation to Punta Arenas in 1848, Biguá engaged with the Chilean government, trading various goods. In 1845 the Anglican missionary Allen Francis Gardiner — who had tried unsuccessfully to convert the Mapuches of Valdivia in 1843 — traversed the strait, Tierra del Fuego, and the Beagle Channel, and then passed by the Falkland Islands (Spanish Islas Malvinas), which had already been colonized by the British since 1833. The following year he joined the South American Mission Society, which had been created in London, and which had set up a first mission on Keppel Island (Spanish Isla Vigía).

In this way, he traveled once again to the strait—this time with the intention of establishing his quarters in the Bay of San Gregorio, not far from Biguá’s encampments—and began a mission among the Tehuelche people. He enticed them with provisions, persuading them to settle in the vicinity for a few days; however, they soon left, and the evangelizing mission ultimately failed.

Upon learning of what had occurred, the Chilean government—through President Manuel Bulnes—invited him to Santiago, where he would be granted the honorary rank and salary of an army captain. Biguá’s relations with Chile cooled following his demotion, after he was accused of participating in the looting of Punta Arenas during a mutiny in 1851 and of being linked to the 1852 murder of the Chilean governor Bernardo Philippi.

In 1861, he resume trading in Punta Arenas.

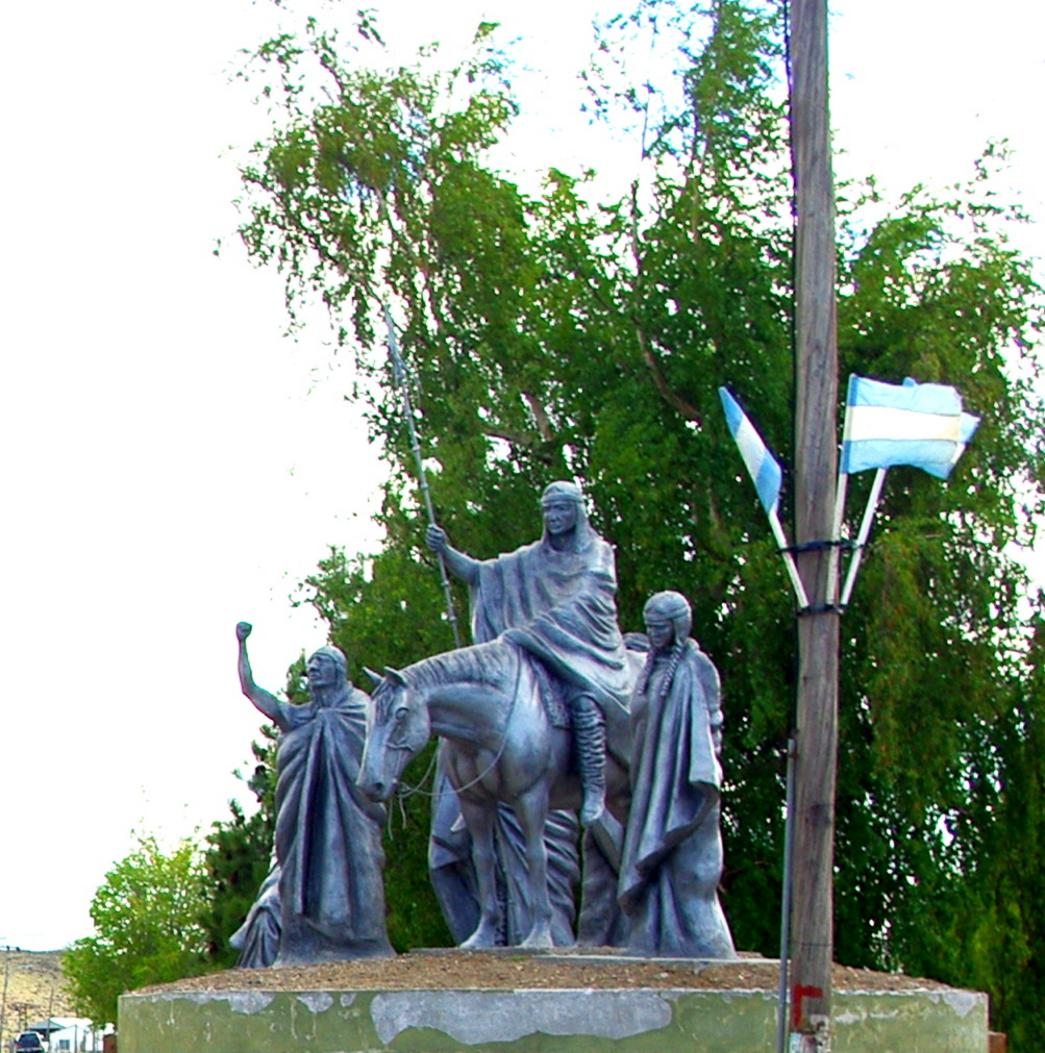
Casimiro Biguá and vassal Tehuelche caciques

He was known for his deference to English travellers and sea-farers.

== Sources ==
- Martinic, Mateo (1977). Historia del Estrecho de Magallanes (in Spanish). Santiago: Andrés Bello.
