= Tehuelche people =

Indigenous people from eastern Patagonia in South America

Tehuelche
Aónikenk (Tehuelche)
- Flag of the Tehuelche people

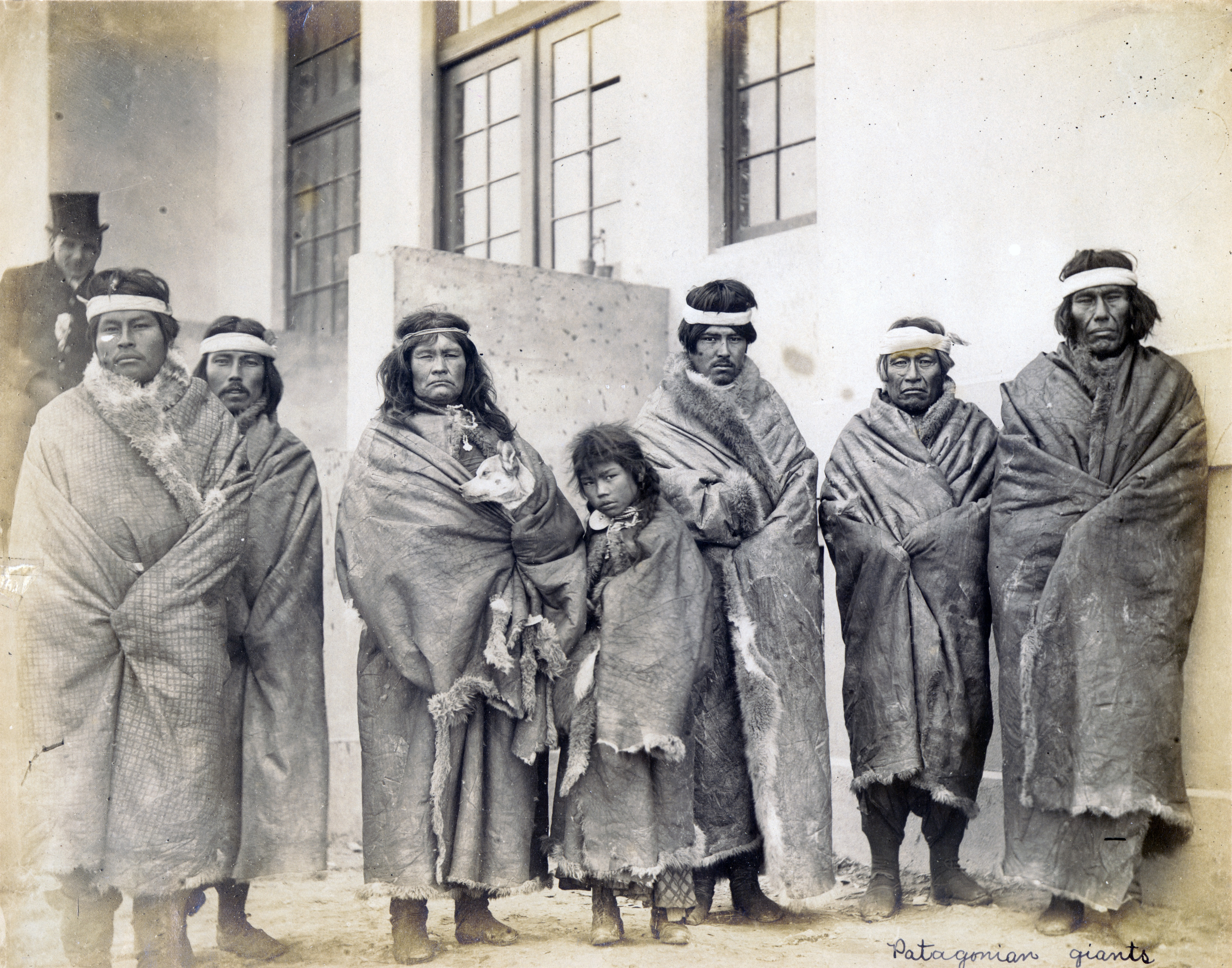
- Tehuelche people of Argentine Patagonia at the 1904 World's Fair.

Total population
- Total: 40,836 • Araucanized: 23,416 • Not araucanized: 17,420

Regions with significant populations
- Argentina: 40,836 (2022)

Languages
- Tehuelche; Mapudungun; Spanish

Religion
- Animism · Catholicism

Related ethnic groups
- Puelche · Haush · Selkʼnam · Teushen

The approximate distribution of languages in the southernmost regions of South America during the years of the Spanish conquest

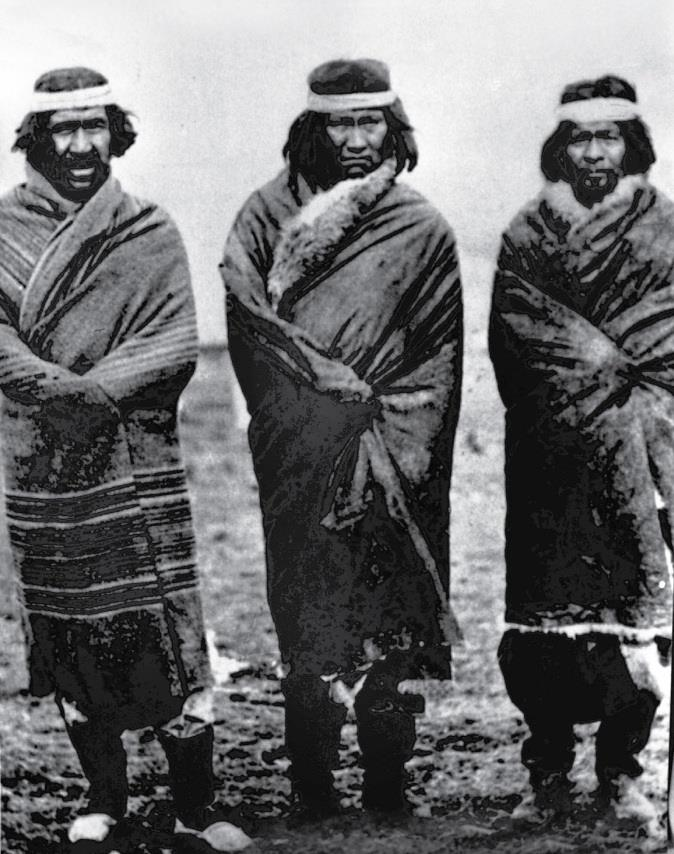
Tehuelche chiefs, located in Santa Cruz Province in the south of Argentina

The Tehuelche people, also called the Aónikenk, are an Indigenous people from eastern Patagonia in South America. In the 18th and 19th centuries, the Tehuelche were influenced by the Mapuche people, and many adopted the domestic use of horses.

Once a nomadic people, the Tehuelche struggled as their lands were colonized in the 19th century by Argentina and Chile, which gradually disrupted their traditional economies. The colonial establishment of large sheep farming estates in Patagonia was particularly detrimental to the Tehuelche. Contact with ethnic European outsiders also introduced new infectious diseases, which caused deadly epidemics among Tehuelche tribes as they lacked acquired immunity. Today most Tehuelche reside in cities and towns of Argentine Patagonia.

The name "Tehuelche complex" has been used by researchers in a broad sense to group together Indigenous peoples from Patagonia and the Pampas. Several specialists, missionaries, and travelers have proposed grouping them together because of the similarities in their cultural traits, geographic vicinity and languages. But the languages they spoke amongst themselves were not related to each other and the peoples were widely distributed geographically.

== Name ==
According to the historian Antonio Pigafetta from Ferdinand Magellan's expedition in 1520, he referred to the Indigenous people he came across in the San Julian Bay as the "Patagoni". In 1535 the historian Gonzalo Fernández de Oviedo y Valdés explained in his Historia general y natural de las Indias (General and Natural History of the Indies), that "We Spaniards call them the Patagones for their big feet", which the historian Francisco López de Gómara agreed with in 1552. Based on these accounts, the first name the Spanish used to refer to the Tehuelche people was the Patagones. However, some researchers speculate, without verifiable bases, that Magellan could have been inspired by the dog-headed monster from the 1512 novel Primaleón known as "Pathogan".

According to the most widespread view, the word Tehuelche comes from the Mapuche term chewel che, which would mean "brave people", "rugged people", or "barren land people". Another version suggests that it could be derived from one of their factions, the Tueshens, plus the Mapuche word "che" meaning 'people' or 'peoples'.

== Classifications ==
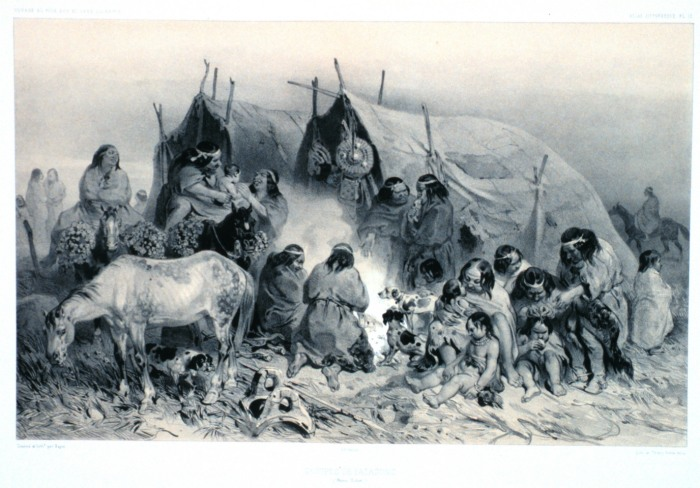
Grupo de patagones en puerto Peckett. An 1832 drawing made during the voyage of Jules Dumont d'Urville.

The classification of Indigenous groups that lived in the Pampas and Patagonia is confusing due to the different terms that were used to refer to the native population groups from these regions. There are various causes that have prevented the establishment of one unique and complete classification. Among these circumstances, the extinction of some of these groups, coupled with the vast amount of land on which these groups were distributed, which inhibited Spanish explorers who first identified certain Tehuelche peoples from making contact with all the groups. In other cases, the seasonal migrations that they practiced which involved traveling long distances made Europeans that observed them overestimate the number of people from a group or the distribution range of a language. In conjunction with all of these factors, the intrusion of the Mapuches, or Araucans, from the west deeply transformed their cultural reality, intermixing and absorbing ethnic groups from the Pampas and central and North of Patagonia, producing the Araucanization of a large part of the ancient inhabitants. Finally, the subsequent Conquest of the Desert carried out by the Argentine Army led to the near extinction of these Indigenous communities. This historic overview has led to the disagreement among researchers.

In the 19th century, explorers such as Ramón Lista and George Chaworth Musters named them "tsóneka", "tsónik" or "chonik". The majority of experts agree that the Chubut river separated the two largest subdivisions: the "Southern Tehuelche" and "Northern Tehuelche". The first subdivision stretched towards the south to the Strait of Magellan, whereas the second group extended towards the north to the Colorado River (Argentina) and Rio Negro (Argentina). The presence, or lack thereof, Tehuelche people in the Pampas has led to disagreements among researchers, who have not agreed on the existence of a separate subdivision called the "Pampas", nor what their relationship and borders were with the Mapuches.

=== According to Thomas Falkner ===
One of the primary classifications was from English Jesuit Thomas Falkner in his 1774 work A description of Patagonia and the adjoining parts of South America, which introduced the ethnic name 'Het peoples' for the Puelche people, which included the Tehuelche:

The Puelches, or Eastern Peoples ... They bear different denominations, according to the situation of their respective countries, of because they were originally of different nations. Those toward the north are called Taluhets; to the west and south of these are the Diuihets; to the south east, the Chechehets; and to the south of these last is the country of the Tehuelhets ...

or Falkner the "Tehuelhets" or "Patagones" were the Tehuelche people who lived from the banks of the Rio Negro to the Strait of Magellan:

The Tehuelhets, who in Europe are known by the name of Patagons, have been, through ignorance of their idiom, called Tehuelchus; for chu signifies country of abode, and not people; which is expressed by the word het, and, more to the south, by the word kunnee or kunny. These and the Chechehets are known to the Spaniards by the name of Serranos, or Mountaineers. They are split into a great many subdivisions, as the Leuvuches, or People of the River, and Calille-Het, or People of the Mountains; amongst whom are the Chulilau-cunnees, Sehuau-cunnees, and Yacana-cunnees. All these, except those of the River, are called by the Moluches, Vucha-Huilliches.

=== According to Milcíades Vignati ===
In 1936 Milcíades Vignati published Las culturas indígenas de la Pampa y Las culturas indígenas de la Patagonia (The Indigenous Cultures of the Pampas and the Indigenous Cultures of Patagonia) in which he proposed that between the 16th and 19th centuries the "Gününa-küne" or "Tuelches" lived from the southern half of the province of Rio Negro to the boundary between the present Chubut and Santa Cruz provinces. The "Serranos" were to the North of them and the "Aônükün'k" or "Patagones" were located to the South. These peoples were divided between three groups: the "Peénken" (people of the North), the "Háunikenk" (people of the South), and the "Aónikenk" (the people of the West).

=== According to Federico Escalada ===
In his 1949 piece El complejo tehuelche. Estudio de etnografía patagónica (The Tehuelche Complex. An Ethnographic study of Patagonians), the military doctor Federico A. Escalada classified the Tehuelche people from historic periods, on the basis of the Estudio de la realidad humana y de la bibliografía (Study of Human Reality and Bibliography), into five simple categories, each with their own language derived from a mother language called "Ken". He grouped them together geographically into "dry land" and "islanders", denying the existence of a separate "Pampa" group.

The names used by Escalada, which he obtained from Mapuche-speaking informants, were:

- Dry land Tehuelche people:
  - "Guénena-kéne": the group he considered the northern component of the Tehuelche complex. It is evident that the group, historically, lived primarily along the main rivers of North Patagonia and extended through the northern territories of Chubut, up to Río Negro, constantly entering in to the south of the present Buenos Aires Province and the southeastern region of La Pampa Province. The name Guénena-kéne was provided to Escalada in 1945 by Chief Ciriaco Chaquilla from the Chubut Panyanieyo area, who identified himself as a member of the "Pampa Verdadero". He spoke the Puelche language, which was used by the Guénena-kéne people. Escalada's classification of the Guénena-kéne people coincided with other individuals who encountered the same group such as: Guillermo Cox, a British traveler who traveled through the south of Neuquén in 1863 and referred to the group as the "Northern Tehuelche people"; Juan Federico Hunziker, a Swiss missionary who was in Patagonia in 1864 and referred to the Guénena-kéne as the "Genacin"; Francisco Pascasio Moreno who in 1876 called them the "Gennaken"; and Tomás Harrington, a rural teacher who went through Chubut between 1911 and 1935 and compiled a vocabulary which he published in 1946 stating that the Indigenous peoples who informed him about their almost dead language referred to themselves as "Gününa küne". In combination with other neighboring groups the Guénena-kéne were generally referred to as the Puelches (i.e. 'Eastern') by the Mapuches, a name which Alcide d'Orbigny also gave them in his Voyage dans l'Amérique méridionale (1826–1833). The Salesian missionary Doménico Milanesio named the Guénena-kéne the "Pampas" in his 1898 vocabulary, published in 1915. In 1922, doctor and German ethnologist Robert Lehmann-Nitsche, who traveled through Argentina circa 1900, called them the "Agününa künnü".
  - "Aóni-kénk": The southern component of the Tehuelche complex, located from the Magellan Strait up to the Chubut River in Argentina and the Palena province in Chile. Escalada called their language Aonika áish, the Tehuelche language. He obtained the name from his informant Agustina Quilchaman de Manquel.
  - "Chehuache-kénk": The western or foothill component of the Tehuelche complex, located in the valleys and foothills of the Andean Mountains between General Carrera Lake and Fontana Lake up to Nahuel Huapi Lake in Argentina. In Chile they were in the Andean sectors of Osorno, Llanquihue Province and the Palena Province. Their language was called Teushen. Escalada was the first to suggest they were a separate component, since researchers who identified them before him positioned them as a southern faction of the Northern Tehuelche people: the "Southern Northern Tehuelche people", who Harrington called "Chulila küne" (Cholila People).
- Island Tehuelche People, located on Isla Grande de Tierra del Fuego:
  - "Selkʼnam": The Selkʼnam people, who lived on the northern steppe region of the island.
  - "Man(e)kʼenk": The Haush, an intermixed group of Selkʼnam with non-Patagonian Yaghan people. They lived in the Mitre Peninsula on the Eastern part of the island.

Distribution of pre-Hispanic peoples in Southern Patagonia

=== According to Rodolfo Casamiquela ===
Argentine historian and paleontologist Rodolfo Casamiquela reviewed Escalada's classifications in his books Rectificaciones y ratificaciones hacia una interpretación definitiva del panorama etnológico de la Patagonia y área septentrional adyacente (Rectifications and ratifications towards a definitive interpretation of the ethnological panorama of Patagonia and the adjacent Northern area) (1965); Un nuevo panorama etnológico del area pan-pampeana y patagónica adyacente (A new ethnological panorama of the Pan-Pampas and adjacent Patagonian area) (1969); and Bosquejo de una etnología de la provincia de Río Negro (Outline of an ethnology of the Río Negro province) (1985), reaffirming the existence of a Tehuelche complex.

Casamiquela proposed the following classification for the continental area circa 1700:

- Southern Southern Tehuelche people: Or Aónik'enk (which in their language means "southern"), also called Aonik or Ch'oonükü. Their distribution was from the Strait of Magellan to the Santa Cruz River and they were nomadic hunters. Their language was "Aonek'o 'a'jen".
- Northern Southern Tehuelche people or Mech'arn: Their epicenter was in the Chico and Chalía river areas in Santa Cruz. Their language was "Téwsün". Casamiquela says they were similar to the southerners and they were absorbed by their southern neighborhoods and the Mapuches.
- Southern Northern Tehuelche people: Also called Pampas and "mountain-dwellers" by historians from Buenos Aires (who lived in the mountains of the Tandilia system and the Sierra de la Ventana). They lived between the Chubut river and Río Negro and Río Limay. Those who lived in the center or east of the Chubut and Río Negro provinces called themselves Günün a künna or Gününa kën (the excellent people). Those who lived in the foothill region north of the Chubut river and west of the Río Negro were called Chüwach a künna or Chëwach a këna ("People on the edge of the mountains). The common language to both groups was "Gününa iájech". Although culturally similar to the southern Tehuelche people, they differed from them because they were Pampian without mixing with Fuegians.
- Northern Northern Tehuelche people: The Puelches from north of Neuquén and the group called Querandí by the Guaraní people belong to this group. At the time of the Spanish arrival in the Pampas, these nomadic Pampian hunters were based in Mendoza Province, and extended in to the south of Córdoba Province and San Luis Province, to almost all of current Buenos Aires Province and the city of Buenos Aires. The Querandí disappeared as a Tehuelche faction, mixing in colonial times with other groups.

== Languages ==
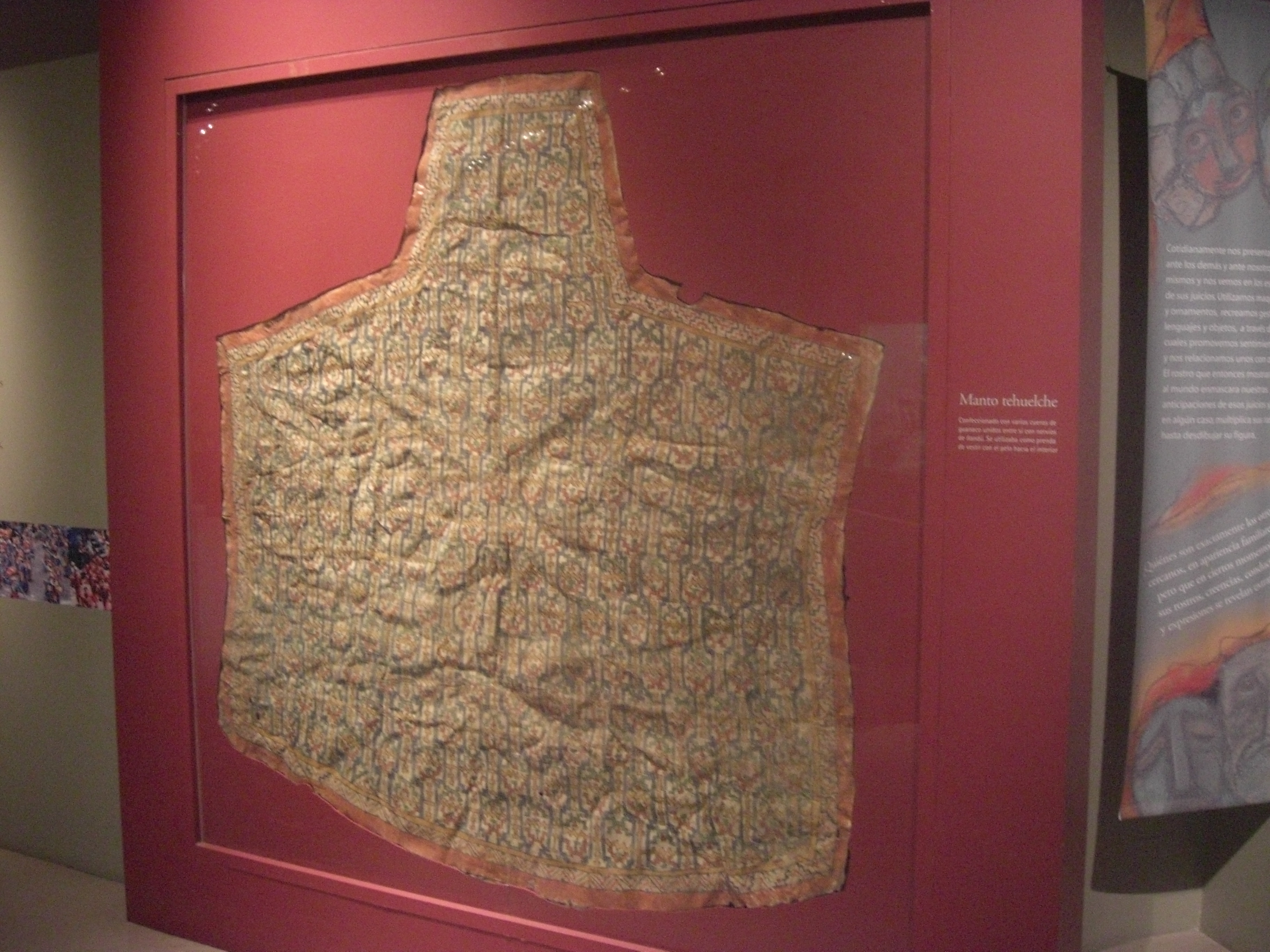
Tehuelche cloak; Museo de La Plata

The different ethnic groups that are recognized under the broad term "Tehuelche" spoke languages whose exact quantity and relationships have been subject to different opinions. For Roberto Lehmann Nitsche, the languages stemming from the Pampas and Patagonia divided in to two groups, the Chonan languages and the Het languages. The available evidence distinguishes between six languages in the Tehuelche complex: the Chon group (Teushen, Aoenek'enk, Selkʼnam and Haush), the language of the Gününa küne Indigenous group and the language of the Querandí people.

The language of the Aonekkenk people appears more closely related to the language of the Teushen people (central eastern Chonan). These languages in turn maintain a closer relationship with the languages from Isla Grande de Tierra del Fuego (southern Chonan) and a more distant relationship with the language of the Gününa küne Indigenous group (northern Chonan). Escalada considered the idea that the entire Tehuelche complex had a common linguistic core, called Ken ('people').

Until the 19th century the following languages were recognized:

- The Gününa küne Indigenous group spoke Puelche (or Gününa yajüch, or Günün a'ajech, or Gününa küne), whose relationship to other languages in the group is disputed and it is often considered a language isolate in the absence of more information;
- The "Tshoneka centrales", meaning, the Indigenous groups located in the current Neuquén, Río Negro and northern Chubut provinces (between the Gennakenk people to the north and the Aonekenk people to the south), spoke a language called Pän-ki-kin (Peénkenk).

In central Patagonia there was also an ancient transition language between the Penkkenk and the Aonekkenk languages, called Tehuesh (Tewsün, Téushenkenk or Teushen), which was gradually replaced by the Aonekkenk language. However, a large portion of the current names of places in the central plateau retain their Tewsün roots today; for example, the name of the Chubut Province is derived from the term "chupat".

Finally, the Aonekken ("people of the South") people speak the language commonly known as the Tehuelche language or Tshoneka or Aonekkenk, which constitutes the language currently most studied from the group and the only language that continues to be used. There is a group of people who try to recover the language through a program called "Kkomshkn e wine awkkoi 'a'ien" ("I am not ashamed of speaking Tehuelche"). The organization focuses on spreading the language and culture.

== Social organization ==
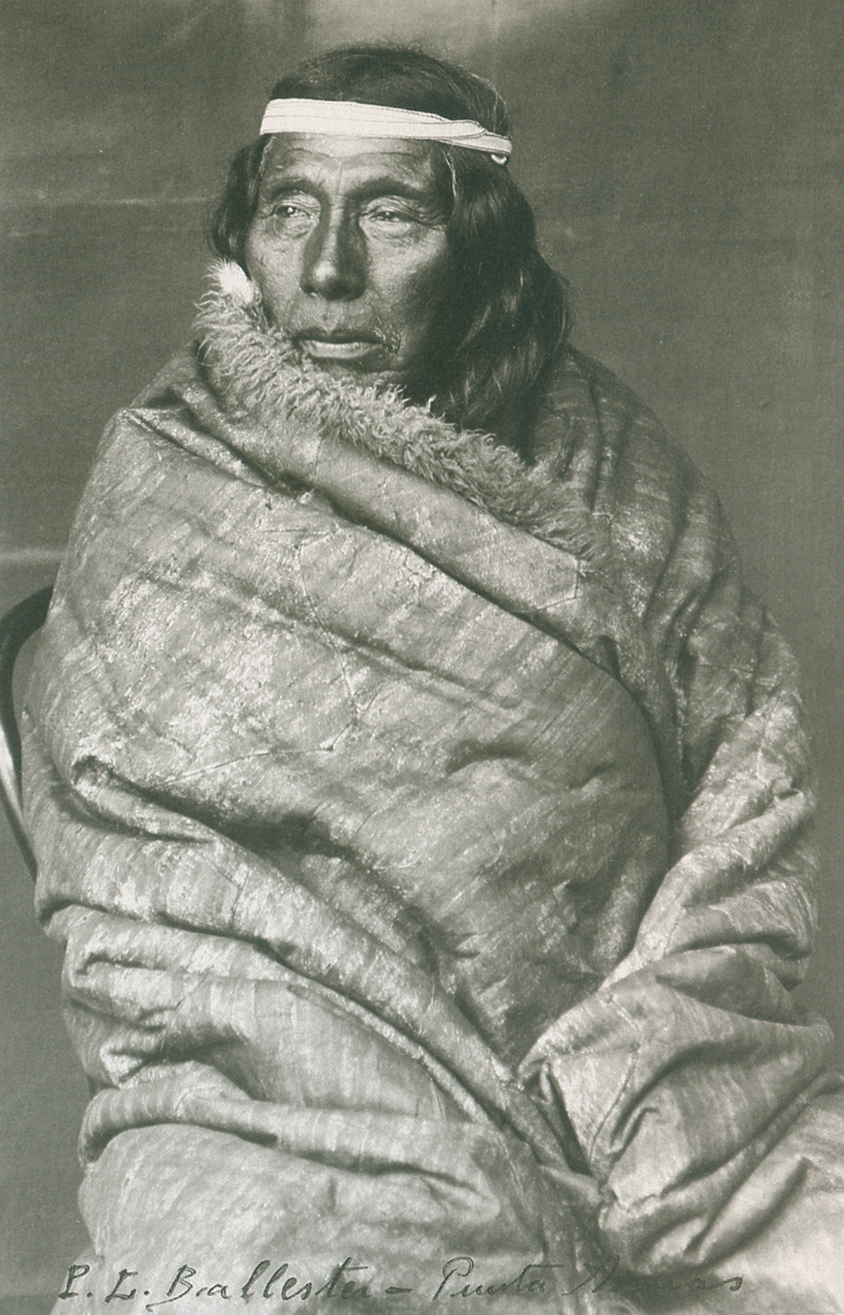
Mulato, a Tehuelche Chief.

Although mobile, Tehuelche groups tended to move in specific circuits, predominantly from west to east and vice versa. During each season, the groups had places where they would set up camps, known as aik or aiken among themselves, and referred to as tolderías by the Spanish and Creoles.

Each Tehuelche group was composed of various kinship and they had specific territories for hunting and gathering. The boundaries of these territories were defined through ancestry by markers with unknown significance: a hill, a trough, a hollow, or important tree. In cases where a group could not satisfy their needs in their own territory, they had to ask for the permission of neighboring people from the same ethnic group to use the resources from their territories; a violation of this rule led to war.

The Tehuelche had a very organized family unit, in which men were the authoritative figures and women were subordinate. In most family contexts, the father would offer his daughter for marriage in exchange for various goods. Each man could have two or three wives, depending on his status.

== Religion ==
As in the case of other ethnic groups that did not develop a state structure, the Tehuelche did not possess an organized religious system (liturgy and vertical structure). However, like all the Pampas and Patagonian peoples, they had a corpus of beliefs based on their own myths and rituals, which were narrated and updated by the shamans who also practiced medicine with the help of the spirits invoked in themselves.

The Tehuelche people believed in diverse Earth spirits, along with a supreme deity who created the world but does not intervene in it. One of the cosmological versions of the creation myth is one in which the deity, known as Kóoch, brought order to the world's chaos, creating distinct elements. Similarly, the Selkʼnam people from Tierra del Fuego in Argentina, narrated a similar myth where the world creator, a deity known as Kénos' (a variant of Kóoch through a common root). According to this, a certain El Lal was sent. Also, within Tehuelche myth, through the god Temauckel, Erral created humans and taught them how to use bows and arrows. The Tehuelche culture embraced the presence of evil spirits called guarichos. Gualichu is an evil spirit in the mythology.

== History ==
=== Pre-Columbian period ===
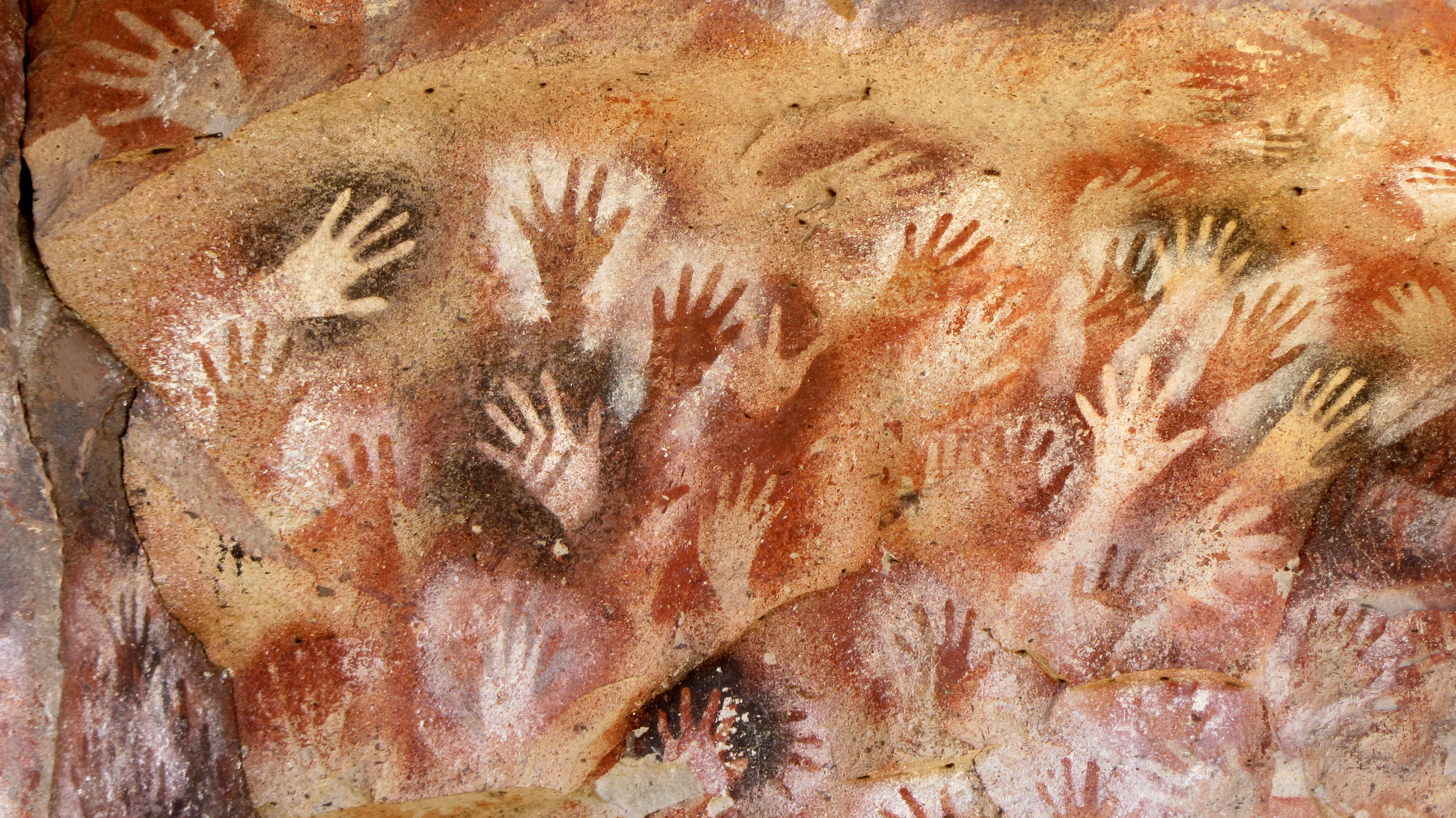
Rock art at Cueva de las Manos, Santa Cruz Province

The ancestors of the Tehuelche are probably responsible for the creation of the rock art of Cueva de las Manos, created from about 13,000 to 9,000 years ago up until around 700 A.D. Six thousand years ago the Toldense industry emerged, consisting primarily of goods such as two-sided sub-triangular projectile points, lateral and terminal scrapers, bifacial knives and tools made from bone. Later, between 7000 and 4000 B.C., the Casapedrense industry appeared, characterized by a greater proportion of stone tools made in sheets, which was most likely a demonstration of a specialization in guanaco hunting, which is also present in the subsequent cultural developments of the Tehuelche people.

From this time and until the European arrival (early 16th century) the Tehuelche people were hunter-gatherers who utilized seasonal mobility, moving towards guanaco herds. During the winter they were in the low areas (meadows, wetlands, shores, lake shores, etc.), and during the summer they moved up to the central plateaus of Patagonia or to the Andes mountains where they had, among other sacred sites, Mount Fitz Roy.

=== Spanish arrival ===
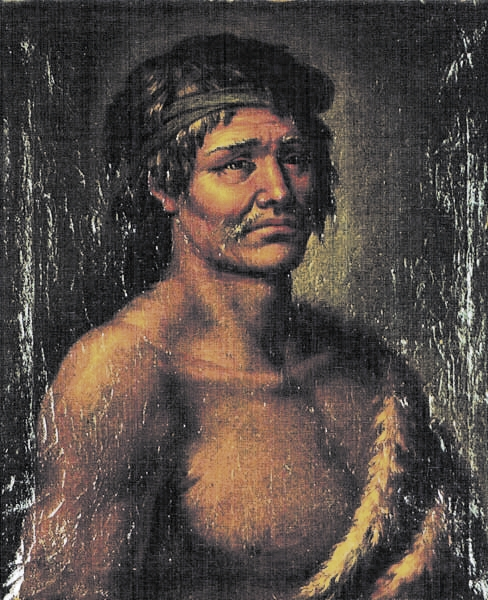
Portrait of Chief Junchar by José del Pozo in Puerto Deseado, in 1789, during the Malaspina Expedition (1789–1794)

On 31 March 1520 the Spanish expedition, under the command of Fernando de Magallanes, landed in San Julián Bay to spend the winter there. Here, they made contact with Tehuelche Indigenous groups, who they referred to as "Patagones", as told by the scribe, Antonio Pigafetta. Pigaffetta described these people as a mythical tribe of Patagonian giants.

Prior to meeting the Tehuelche groups in person, the explorers had been amazed by the size of their footprints. Enlarged by the animal furs they used as footwear, their feet appeared much larger than those of the Europeans at the time. During the 16th century, the average male height of Europeans at around 165 cm (5 ft 5 in) would have been shorter than the Patagonian men whose height reportedly averaged above 2 metres (6 ft 7 in) by some accounts and around 183 centimetres (6 ft) by other accounts. Thus the Europeans may have considered them to be "Patones" ('large footed') or the Patagonians may have reminded the explorers of the giant Pathoagón from the knighthood novel Primaleón. The Patagonians' large craniometry made them famous in European literature from the 16th to the 19th centuries due to their large stature and physical strength.

=== Influence from the Mapuches ===
Since the 18th century, there was important commercial activity and product exchanges among the native inhabitants of the Pampas plains and the Sierras of the current Buenos Aires Province, the inhabitants of Northern Patagonia, and those of both edges of the Andes. There were two very important trade fairs in Cayrú and Chapaleofú. These trade fairs, called "Poncho fairs" by the Jesuits at the time who recorded their existence (such as Thomas Falkner), were places for the exchange of various types of products: from livestock and agricultural products to garments, such as ponchos. Cayrú was located in the most western part of the Tandilia system (in the current territory of the Olavarría Partido). Chapaleofú refers to the homonymic water stream vicinity, situated in the current Tandil Partido. Both municipalities, or partidos, are located in the interior of the current Buenos Aires Province. The movements of people to participate in the exchanging of products generated certain cultural exchanges between different groups living anywhere from the humid Pampas, the northern Patagonia, the immediate area near the Andes (both on its western and eastern edges), to the coast of the Pacific Ocean. This was the start of cultural exchanges and migratory movements, between distinct groups such as the Tehuelche, Ranquel and Mapuche people.

Although Mapuche trade started as a means of fostering commerce and alliances, it was completed by generating a large cultural influence on the Tehuelche and other groups, to the point that it is referred to as the "Mapuchization" or "Araucanization of Patagonia". A large portion of the Tehuelche and Ranquel peoples adopted many of the Mapuche customs and their language, while the Mapuches adopted parts of the Tehuelche way of life (such as living in tolderías) and thereby, the differences between the two groups were blurred to the point that their descendants refer to themselves as Mapuche-Tehuelche people.

During the first half of the 18th century, Chief Cacapol and his son, Chief Cangapol, were the most important chiefs in the regions extending from the Andes Mountains to the Atlantic Oceans, and from the Río Negro to the Salado River. Cangapol had a seat in the government in the Sierra de la Ventana region, and their people were known as the "Mountain Pampas". The Pampas knew how to align themselves with the Mapuches from the west, to attack the Buenos Aires Campaign in 1740.

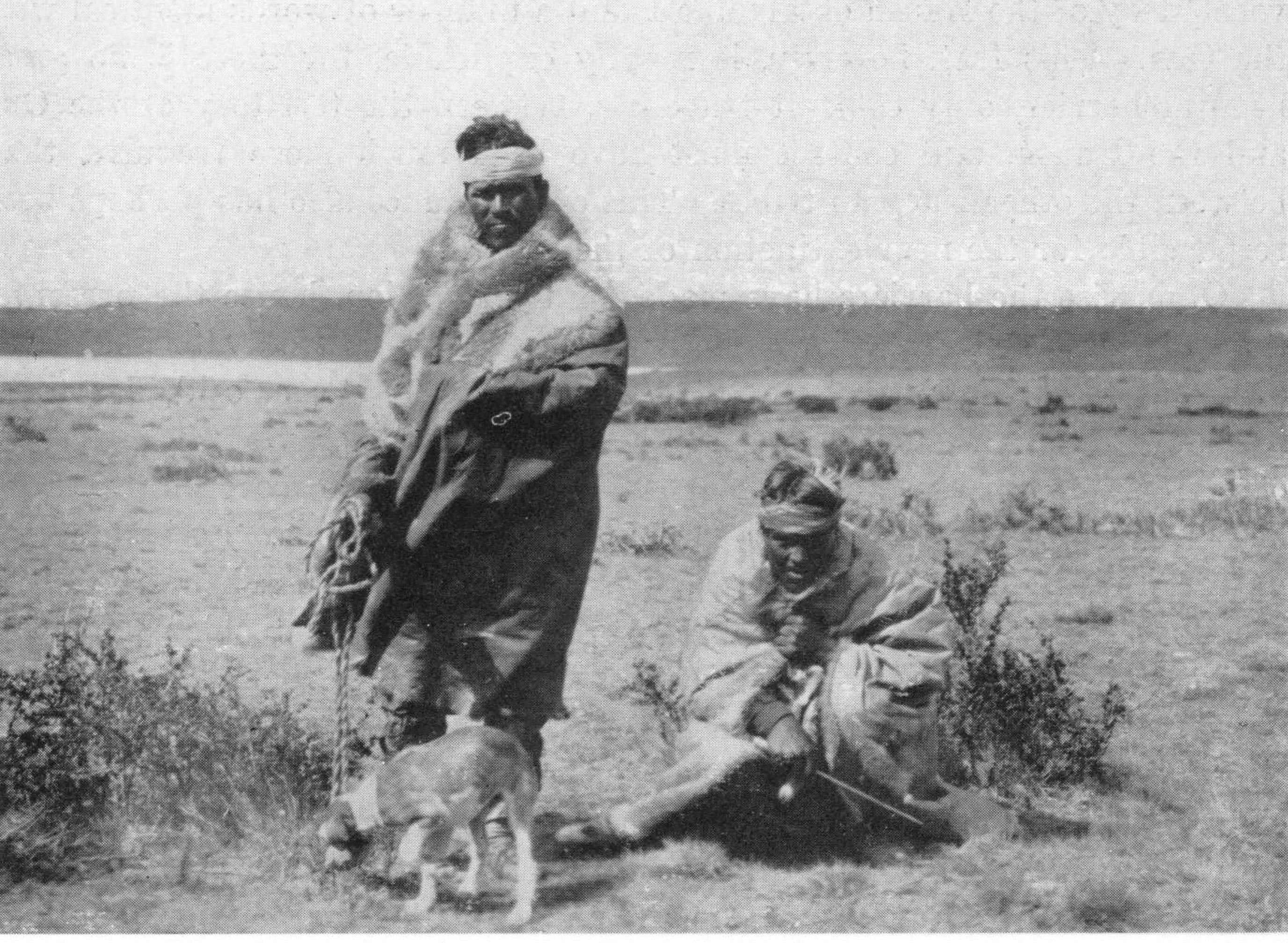
Tehuelches in Río Gallegos

In this process there were also inter-ethnic struggles and by 1820 heavy combat erupted between the Patagones and Pehuenches on the banks of the Senguerr River; other combat occurred at Barrancas Blancas and Shótel Káike. By 1828, the Pincheira Royalist army attacked the Tehuelche group in the Bahía Blanca and Carmen de Patagones area.

The Tehuelche people south of the Río Negro had a female chief: María la Grande. Her successor, Casimiro Biguá, was the first Tehuelche chief to make treaties with the Argentine government. His sons, Chiefs Papón and Mulato, ended up on a reserve in southern Chile.

The Tehuelche people had to live with Welsh immigrants who, since the second half of the 19th century, began to settle in Chubut: the relations were generally harmonious between the two groups. In 1869, Chief Biguá recognized the need to defend the Welsh against a potential attack from Chief Calfucurá.

Little information is known about Tehuelche culture before the use of the horse, although their socioeconomic organization resembled that of the Selkʼnam people from Tierra del Fuego. The introduction of the horse by the Spaniards, which they became acquainted with as of 1570, transformed the social organization of Tehuelche people: the introduction caused groups to develop dependencies on horses in their daily lives. Like the Indigenous groups in the North American Great Plains, the Tehuelche also worked the thicket steppes of Patagonia, living mainly off of guanaco and rhea meat (ñandú or choique), followed by South Andean deer, deer, Patagonian mara and even puma and jaguar meat, in addition to certain plants (although late, they learned how to cultivate the land). As for fish and shellfish, there were certain cases where their consumption was banned: for example, some groups had prohibited the consumption of fish. Their groups used to consist of between 50 and 100 members.

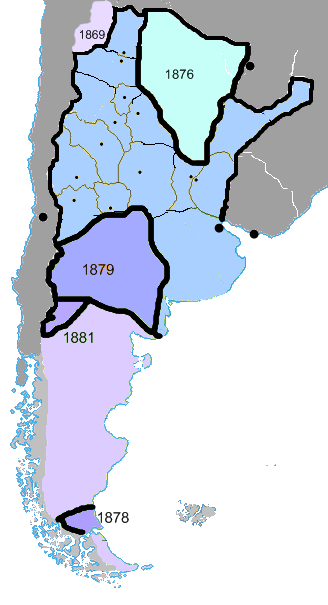
Under General Roca, the Conquest of the Desert extended Argentine power into Patagonia

The adoption of the horse meant an extensive social change in Tehuelche culture: the new mobility altered their ancestral territories and greatly affected their movement patterns. Before the 17th century east–west movements prevailed in pursuit of guanacos; however, as of the dawn of the equestrian complex, longitudinal movements (from south to north and vice versa) were very important in establishing extensive exchange networks. In the mid-19th century the Aonikenk exchanged their skins and mollusks for cholilas (strawberries, blackberries, raspberries, Magellan barberry, Chilean pine tree seeds, Cyttaria, buds and Chilean bamboo buds, etc.) and apples with the Gennakenk people of Neuquén, the upper valley of Río Negro and the so-called 'country of Strawberries', or Chulilaw (the region approximately bounded to the north by Lake Nahuel Huapi, to the east by the low mountains and morraines called Patagónides, to the west by the high summits of the Andes and to the south by Lake Buenos Aires/General Carrera).

The horse, or more precisely, the mare, became a principle part of the Tehuelche diet, leaving guanacos in second place. The Selkʼnam from Tierra del Fuego did not develop a comparable dependency on horses.

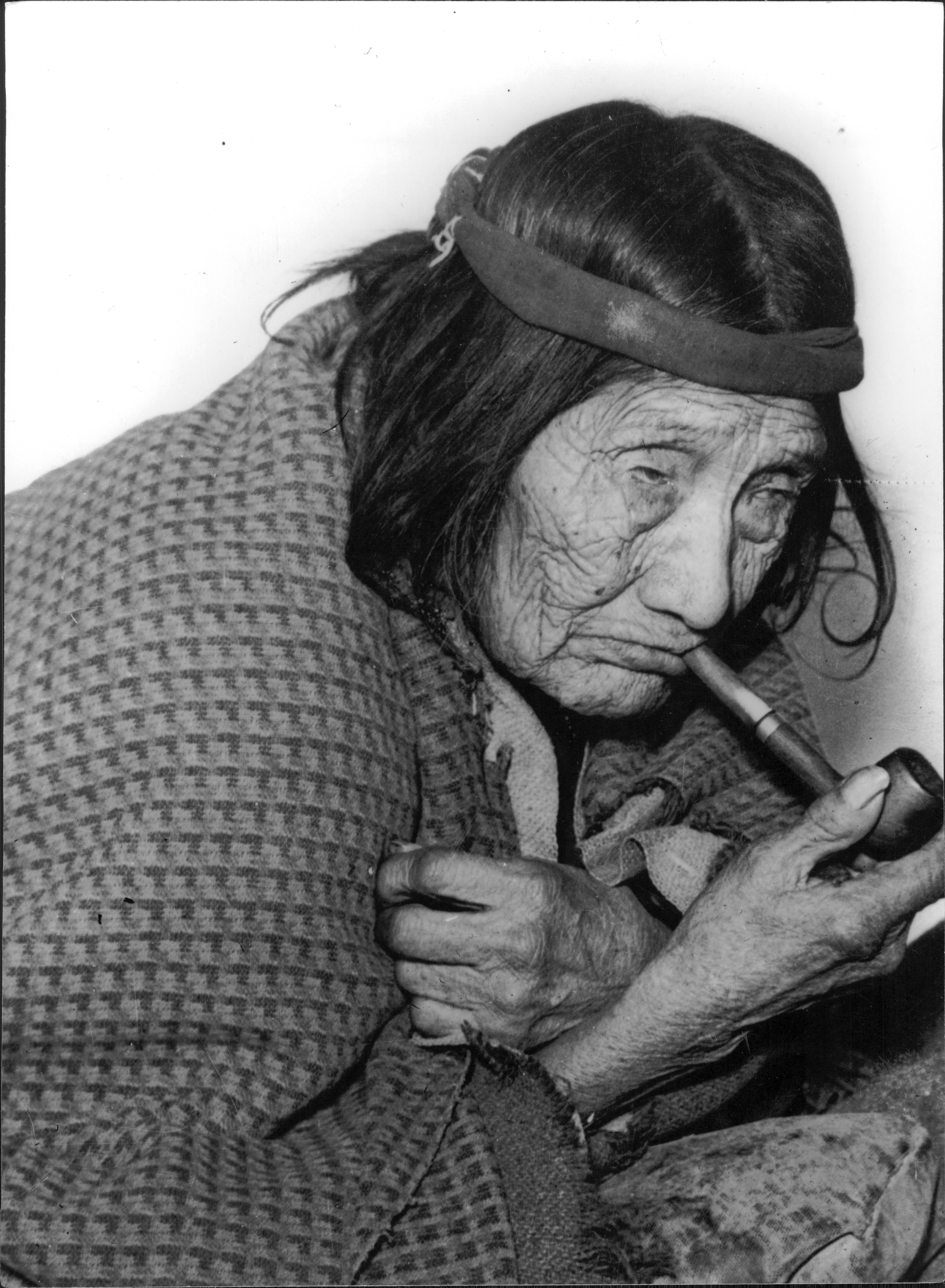
Elderly Tehuelche woman smoking a tobacco pipe

=== Relations with Welsh settlers ===
Welsh settlers arrived in the Tehuelche lands of the lower Chubut Valley in 1865. Relations were mostly amicable and have been described as mutual feelings of "trust and admiration". Paternalistic attitudes toward the Tehuelche were common among the Welsh. There was a widespread critical view among the Welsh of the Argentine military's treatment of the Tehuelche and of traders who provided Tehuelches with alcohol and weaponry.

=== Abduction and forced exhibition ===
As early as the second half of the 19th century, Tehuelche groups were abducted and displayed against their will in countries such as Belgium, Switzerland, (Germany), France and England. More specific data shows that a chief known as Pitioche and his wife and child were captured. Reports of these shocking facts form part of Christian Báez and Peter Mason's book Zoológicos humanos (Human Zoos).

Anthropologist Robert Lehmann-Nitsche was also criticized for having studied members of the Tehuelche people who had been abducted and were exhibited in circuses.

=== Reservations in Santa Cruz ===
By decree of President José Evaristo Uriburu on 11 January 1898, the Camusu Aike reservation was created for the "gathering of Tehuelche tribes". The reservation is located in the Santa Cruz Province of Argentina.

In 1922, President Hipólito Yrigoyen created the following reserves by decree: Lago Viedma (Lots 119–117) between 20,000 and 25,000 hectares (200–250 km^{2}; 77–97 sq mi), Lago Cardiel (Lot 6) and Lago Cardiel (Lot 28 bis). The first two were stripped of their status in 1966 and the third in 1990.

=== Notable Tehuelche people ===
- Inacayal
- Loncopán
- Salpul

== Present-day status of the Tehuelche ==
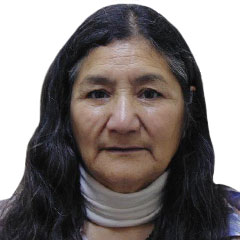
Rosa Chiquichano, of Tehuelche descent. A past member of the Argentine Chamber of Deputies, representing the Chubut Province.

According to the unfinished "National Indigenous Census" (1966–1968), there were only a few Tehuelche descendants that spoke the Tehuelche language. The population of Tehuelche descent that has remained the most attached to their culture is located in the central plateau of the Santa Cruz Province, although the population is intermixed with those of other descents. The census recorded that in Santa Cruz Province:

- Deseado Department: 28 Tehuelches, no Aonekko 'a'ien speakers
- Güer Aike Department: 44 Tehuelches, 24 Aonekko 'a'ien speakers (Camusu Aike Settlement)
- Lago Argentino Department: 36 Tehuelches, 14 Aonekko 'a'ien speakers (Cerro Índice Settlement with 5 families, 24 people).
- Lago Buenos Aires Department: 6 Tehuelches, 2 Aonekko 'a'ien speakers.
- Río Chico Department: 52 Tehuelches, 11 Aonekko 'a'ien speakers (2 Tehuelche settlements in this department: Lot 6 with 34 inhabitants, and Lot 28 bis with 3 families)

There were also inter-mixed marriages in Tres Lagos, Puerto San Julián, Gobernador Gregores and Río Gallegos.

The "Complementary Survey of Indigenous peoples" (ECPI) 2004–2005, supplementary to the "2001 National Census of Population, Household and Housing," resulted in the recognition of 4351 people descended from the first generation of Tehuelche people in the Chubut and Santa Cruz Provinces. Another 1664 considered themselves Tehuelche within the city of Buenos Aires and the 24 partidos of Greater Buenos Aires; with 4575 in the rest of the country. In all of Argentina 10,590 people considered themselves Tehuelche.

The 2010 National Population Census in Argentina revealed the existence of 27,813 people who considered themselves Tehuelche throughout the country, 7924 in the Chubut Province, 4570 in the interior of the Buenos Aires Province, 2615 in the Santa Cruz Province, 2269 in the Río Negro Province, 1702 in the city of Buenos Aires, 844 in the Mendoza Province, 738 in the Neuquén Province and 625 in the La Pampa Province.

There are currently Tehuelche settlements in the Santa Cruz Province including:

- Camusu Aike Territory: 180 km northwest of Río Gallegos, recognized in September 2007 with legal entity status.
- Lago Cardiel Lot 6: Between Gobernador Gregores City and San Martín Lake.
- Lago Cardiel Lot 28 bis: Close to Gobernador Gregores City.
- Cerro Índice: 40 km southeast of Viedma Lake and 50 km south of Tres Lagos.
- Copolque (or Kopolke): Located in the Leandro N. Alem Settlement in the surrounding area of Las Heras in the Deseado Department.

The Tehuelche flag: The blue of the sea, the brown of the mountains, the black arrow pointing north and the Southern Cross.

There are some bilingual Aonekko 'a'ien speakers in these settlements; the rest speak Spanish.

There are two reservations located in the Chubut Province. El Chalía, the Manuel Quilchamal community, in the Río Senguer Department, located 60 km from the Doctor Ricardo Rojas village. El Chalía was created in 1916 with 60,000 ha, but today its area has been reduced to 32,000, with 80 residents. Loma Redonda is a reservation located between Río Mayo and Alto Río Senguer, with 30 residents. 17.65% of the people inhabiting these reservations are bilingual in Spanish and Mapudungun and the rest speak Spanish. The 1991 census only reported two elderly women with memory of the Aonek'o 'a'ien language.

Since 1995, the Instituto Nacional de Asuntos Indígenas (INAI), or National Institute for Indigenous Affairs, began recognizing the legal status of Indigenous communities in Argentina through registration in the National Registry of Indigenous Communities (Renaci). Among these were 2 Tehuelche communities in the Santa Cruz Province and 4 Mapuche-Tehuelche communities in the Chubut, Río Negro, Buenos Aires and Santa Cruz Provinces:

Santa Cruz Province (Tehuelche People)

- Copolque Community (in the Deseado Department, 5 June 2007)
- Camusu Aike Community (in the Güer Aike Department, 14 September 2007)

Santa Cruz Province (Mapuche-Tehuelche People)

- Nehuen Mulfuñ Community (in the city of Pico Truncado in the Deseado Department, 25 March 2014)

Chubut Province (Mapuche-Tehuelche People)

- Vuelta del Río Indigenous Community (in the Cushamen Department, 24 February 1997)

Río Negro Province (Tehuelche People)

- Río Chico Indigenous Community (in the Ñorquinco Department, 1 September 2000)

Buenos Aires Province (Mapuche-Tehuelche People)

- Tehuelche Callvu Shotel (in the La Plata Partido, 18 May 2010)

=== Mapuche-Tehuelche communities ===
In the Chubut Province, there are mixed communities of Mapuche and Tehuelche people, and they call themselves Mapuche-Tehuelche:

- Huanguelen Puelo Community (Puelo Lake).
- Motoco Cárdenas Community (Puelo Lake).
- Cayún Community (Puelo Lake),
- Vuelta del Río Community (Cushamen Indigenous Reserve),
- Emilio Prane Nahuelpan Community (League 4),
- Enrique Sepúlveda Community (Buenos Aires Chico),
- Huisca Antieco Community (Alto Río Corinto),
- Blancura y Rinconada Community,
- Blancuntre-Yala Laubat Community,
- Traquetren Community,
- Auke Mapu Community,
- Pocitos de Quichaura Community,
- Paso de Indios Community (Paso de Indios),
- Katrawunletuayiñ Community (Rawson),
- Tramaleo Loma Redonda Community,
- Laguna Fría-Chacay Oeste Community,
- Mallin de los Cuales Community (Gan Gan),
- Mapuche Tehuelche Pu Fotum Mapu Community (Puerto Madryn),
- Esteban Tracaleu Community,
- Loma Redonda – Tramaleu Community,
- Taguatran Community,
- Tewelche Mapuche Pu Kona Mapu Community (Puerto Madryn),
- Mapuche Tehuelche Indigenous group "Gnechen Peñi Mapu" (Puerto Madryn),
- Sierras de Huancache Community,
- Bajada de Gaucho Senguer Community,
- Willi Pu folil Kona Community,
- "Namuncurá-Sayhueque" Community (Gaiman),
- Mariano Epulef Community,
- El Molle Community,
- Nahuel Pan Community,
- Río Mayo Community (Mayo River),
- Himun Community Organization,
- Rincón del Moro Community,
- Escorial Community,
- Rinconada Community,
- Cushamen Centro Community,
- Mapuche Tehuelche Trelew Community (Trelew),
- Pampa de Guanaco Community,
- Sierra de Gualjaina Community,
- Bajo la Cancha Community,
- Arroyo del Chalía Indigenous Community,
- Caniu Community (Buenos Aires Chico – El Maitén, Chubut).

Four urban Mapuche-Tehuelche communities also exist in Santa Cruz: in Caleta Olivia (Fem Mapu), Gallegos River (Aitué), in Río Turbio (Willimapu) and in Puerto Santa Cruz (Millanahuel).

The Cushamen Indigenous reserve in the Cushamen Department in Chubut was created in 1889 to accommodate Chief Miguel Ñancuche Nahuelquir's tribe, who was removed from the Neuquén mountain area by the Conquest of the Desert. It comprises 1250 km^{2} and 400 Mapuches-Tehuelche families.

=== In Chile ===
The Tehuelche group is nearly extinct in Chile. In 1905 they suffered a smallpox epidemic that killed Chief Mulato and other members of his settled tribe in the río Zurdo valley, near Punta Arenas. The survivors took refuge in Argentinian territory, possibly on the Cumusu Aike reserve. Their memory is present in the name Villa Tehuelches, a Chilean town in the Laguna Blanca commune.

== Notes ==
=== Bibliography ===
- Williams, Glyn (1975). The desert and the dream: A study of Welsh colonization in Chubut 1865 – 1915. Cardiff: University of Wales Press. ISBN 978-0-7083-0579-9.
