= María la Grande =

19th-century indigenous leader from Patagonia

María
- La Grande
- Modern-day portrait of María la Grande

Cacica of the southern Tehuelche people from the Strait of Magellan and the Patagonian coast
- Reign: First half of the 19th century
- Successor: Casimiro Biguá
- Born: c. 1789; Disputed (Note: Although several historical sources claim that she was born in Asunción, Paraguay, this is unlikely considering the areas that both Maria's and her father's communities inhabited. Some historians argue that her full baptismal name was María de la Asunción, which caused the chroniclers to erroneously attribute Asunción as her place of birth.)
- Died: c. 1841–47; Patagonia
- Issue: 5
- Father: Vicente
- Citizenship: Tehuelche

María (c. 1789 – c. 1841–47), better known as María la Grande or María Grande (English: María the Great), was the Christian name of a woman who served as the cacica of the southern Tehuelche people who lived in the Strait of Magellan and the Patagonian coast during the first half of the 19th century. Her direct domain was focused in the territory of the Bay of San Gregorio, in the present-day Chilean region of Magallanes, although she was called upon in other Patagonian regions when a conflictive situation required her judgment.

María was a leader of great prestige and power among the Tehuelche people, known for her skills as a ruler and merchant with European settlers and explorers. She is considered one of the most prominent figures in the history of Patagonia. Her influence covered the entirety of Argentine Patagonia, from the Río Negro to the Strait of Magellan.

During her rule, she came into contact with the expeditions of James Weddell, Phillip Parker King, Robert FitzRoy and Luis Vernet, among others. The epithet "the Great"—a reference to Catherine II of Russia—was given to María by the latter upon meeting her in the Valdes Peninsula, in the present-day Argentine province of Chubut, in 1828. After being appointed as the commander of the Falkland Islands (Spanish: Islas Malvinas) in 1831 by the Argentine government, Vernet invited María to the islands for the purpose of establishing trade relations between their territories.
