= Chan Chan (forest) =

Chan Chan (Spanish: selva de Chan Chan) was a dense forest that existed between Osorno and La Unión in Southern Chile. The forest was intionally put on fire in the summer of 1851 by order of Chilean colonization agent Vicente Pérez Rosales. Pichi Juan, a native Huilliche, was tasked with setting the forest afire. Pichi Juan did so by starting fires at multiple locations. According to Pérez Rosales Pichi Juan barely escaped death by hiding inside the trunk of a Nothofagus dombeyi.

Despite the destruction of the forest of Chan Chan and many other clearances by 1859 Pérez Rosales, now Minister of Colonization, continued to hold that Southern Chile was largely covered with forests. The fire lasted about three months and at a time the nearby city of Valdivia was under "dense smoke" for weeks.

== See also ==
- German colonization of Valdivia, Osorno and Llanquihue
