= Loncopán =

Loncopán also known as Lonkopan (b. unknown, died 1853), was a Tschen chief and also a general of the Argentine Army. Son of Al-Aan, he was part of the Boreal Tehuelches Tschen. The nomadic Tschen travelled through the southern parts of Buenos Aires, La Pampa and Cordoba.

== Confederación Indígena Americana ==
He forged alliances with Calfulcurá and received protection from Don Juan Manuel de Rosas. Tried the peaceful unification of all Native nations in a large American Native Confederation (Confederación Indígena Americana), but the lack of communications and the disparity of interests made it fail. He had a large army and controlled much of the strategic "rastrillas" (trade routes) in southern Buenos Aires province.

After the battle of Caseros, he refused to participate in the war against the Government, causing a rupture with the chief Cafulcurá. Flanked by internal divisions, the tribe is attacked and absorbed by the tehuelches of Gervasio Chipitruz.
