= Carlos Wiederhold =

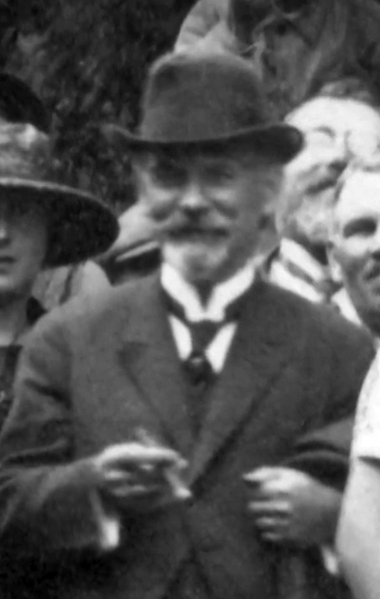
Wiederhold at a celebration in his honor in Bariloche, 1925.

Carlos Wiederhold Piwonka (July 9, 1867 in Osorno, Chile – July 29, 1935 in Santiago, Chile) was a German-Chilean entrepreneur known for establishing the shop La Alemana in 1895, which the city of Bariloche in Argentina grew out of. Wiederhold came from the wealthiest family of city of Osorno whose ancestors had arrived in the Chilean government programme of German colonization of Valdivia, Osorno and Llanquihue. As Wiederhold was named consul of the German Empire in Chile he left Bariloche for Puerto Montt in the 1900s. In Puerto Montt Wiederhold continued to run the business while in Bariloche Wiederhold's business partner Federico Hube, also a German-Chilean from Osorno, was left in charge of local affairs.
