= Beer in Chile =

The primary beer brewed and consumed in Chile is pale lager, though the country also has a tradition of brewing corn beer, known as chicha. Chile's beer history has a strong German influence – some of the bigger beer producers are from the country's southern lake district, a region populated by a great number of German immigrants during the 19th century. Chile also produces English ale-style craft beers while developing its own craft beer identity.

The city of Valdivia in southern Chile is often referred as Chile's "beer capital".

== History ==
There is long tradition of brewing a drink called chicha that might be classified as corn beer by modern standards, though is not considered as such in South America. Chicha was originally brewed with corn, influenced by the Andean cultures of northern Chile and Peru, but during colonial times apple and grape chicha started to be brewed across the country as a cheaper alternative to wine. There were at least four major alcoholic drinks during colonial times in Chile: wine, pisco, aguardiente, and chicha.

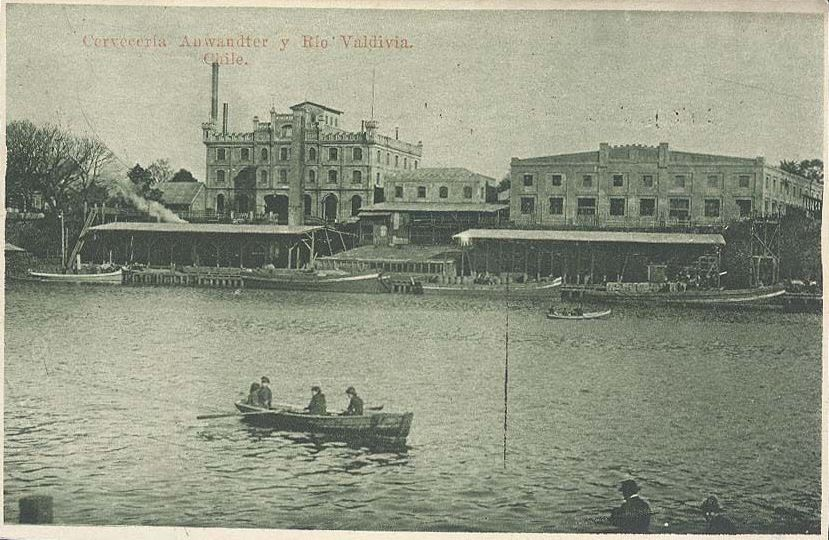
Cerveceria Anwandter, Valdivia, circa 1900

Modern beer (Spanish, cerveza chilena) history in Chile began in the 19th century when European beer was first introduced in the years after Chile gained independence. With the arrival of German immigrants to southern Chile around 1850, massive beer production began. Chile's first beer brewery was established in Valdivia in 1851 by Carl Anwandter. The introduction of beer is credited for causing a decline in chicha production in areas that traditionally supplied Valdivia with that drink such as Máfil. By the end of the 19th century, beer was consumed all over the country. Beer consumption and culture then spread across the country from cities with high immigrant populations such as Valdivia and Valparaíso. In 1907, 20 million litres of beer were produced in Valdivia. A study by the Association of Chilean Beer Brewers (Spanish: Asociación de Productores de Cerveza de Chile, ACECHI) informed that beer consumption had been rising steadily in Chile, with a peak in 2021 of 65,6 liters per capita before falling to 59 liters per capita in 2022.

== Economy ==
Pisco, wine and rum are popular alcoholic drinks in Chile but there has been a slow increase in the sales of lager and pale ale from local microbreweries and imported pale lager. Although Chilean beer consumption is low compared to the rest of the South American region, beer is still the most consumed alcoholic beverage and takes 60% of the total market share for alcoholic drinks. Premium beers alone hold an 18% share of the total market, the highest share seen among the countries of the region. Craft beers in Chile. Part of the so-called premium sector, craft beers have gained ground in recent years, and today there are more than 300 micro-breweries in Chile. Cía Cervecerías Unidas SA, a local company, is the leading Chilean beer company, producing mainly lager beers.

== Chilean beers ==
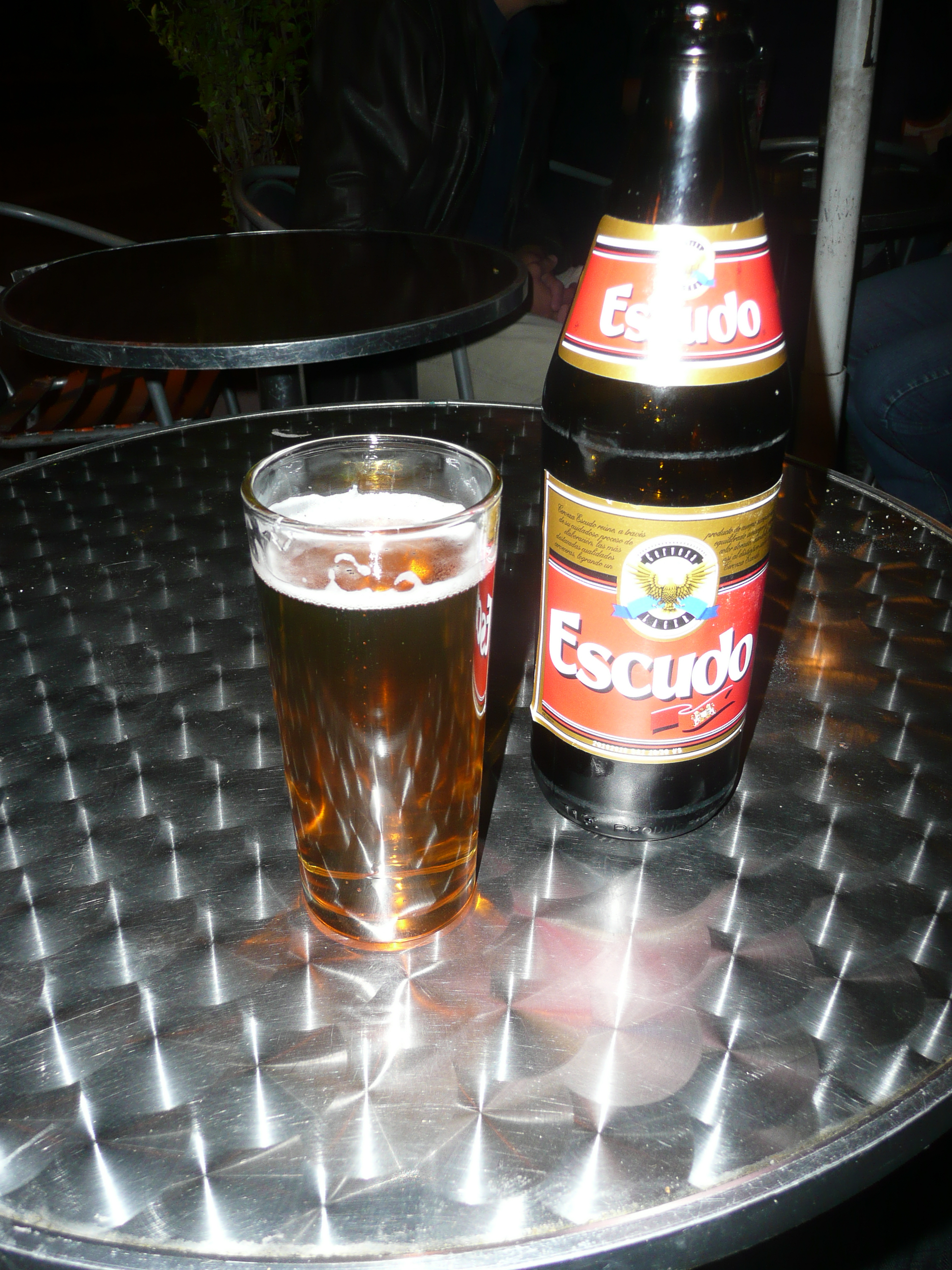
Escudo, an industrial low-price beer.

There are two main big industrial large-scale beer producers in Chile: Compañía de Cervecerías Unidas (CCU) and Cervecería Chile. All others are considered small producers (low volume) and/or craft producers.

=== Compañía de Cervecerías Unidas (CCU) ===
Created in 1902 with the merge of Plagemann, Limache and Gubler & Cousiño beer companies. They produce their own brands of beer and some international brands, along with soft drinks and other alcoholic products. Products include:

- Cerveza Cristal and its varieties Cristal Light and Cristal Zero (non-alcoholic)
- Escudo
- Royal Guard and its variety Royal Guard Black Label
- Malta Morenita
- Dorada
- Lemon Stones (low-alcohol lemon-flavored beer mix)
- Heineken (under license)
- Tecate (under license)
- Coors and Coors Light (under license)
- Sol (under license)

=== Cervecería Chile ===
Produce their own brands and also many known international brands:. Products include:

- Baltica
- Becker
- Malta del sur
- Brahma (under license)
- Beck's (under license)
- Paceña (under license)
- Stella Artois (under license)
- Quilmes (under license)

=== Small producers and premium brands ===
These include smaller volume beer producers and are considered premium brands.

- Kunstmann: From the city of Valdivia, founded in 1850 as Anwandter Beer Company, destroyed in the 1960 Valdivia earthquake and refounded as Kunstmann Brewery, it is actually labeled as a craft beer, and is distributed by CCU. Produces a great variety of different types of beer including Torobayo, Lager, Bock, Honey, Blueberry, Wheat, Session IPA, Non-filtered and Non-alcoholic.
- Austral: Founded circa 1896 in the Patagonia region in Punta Arenas as Cervecería La Patagona, later Polar Beer. It is the most southern beer company in the world. Produces varieties such as Lager, Ale, Torres del Paine, Yagán Dark and Patagona Pale Ale.

=== Craft beer brands ===
Other brands that are entirely considered as craft beers. They are generally low or very low volume producers. In Chile there are more than 150 craft beer producers distributed along the 15 Chilean Regions. The list is long, below are some of the most known:

- Maihue, from Curicó, in the Maule Region
- Kross, from Curacaví near Santiago. Claims to have won more prizes than any other Chilean brewery in the last two years, and ranks first place as the most recognized brand associated with craft beer.
- Del Puerto, from Valparaíso, in the Valparaíso Region
- Cuello Negro, from Valdivia, in the Los Lagos Region. Best known brewery in the south of Chile.
- Guayacán, from Coquimbo Region. Best known brewery in the north of Chile.
- Tübinger, from Pirque near Santiago.
- Szot, from Talagante near Santiago
- Granizo, from Olmué, in the Valparaíso Region.
- Volcanes del Sur, from Colbun, in the Maule Region.
- Jester, from Santiago.
- D'olbeck, from Coyhaique, in the Aysén del General Carlos Ibáñez del Campo Region
- Die M, from Paine near Santiago.
- Grassau, from Villarrica, in the La Araucanía Region
- Mestra, from Paine near Santiago
- Polar Imperial, from Punta Arenas in the Magallanes y la Antártica Chilena Region.
- Quimera, from Quinta Normal in Santiago
- Capital, from Batuco, north of Santiago

== See also ==
- Beer and breweries by region
