= Torobayo =

Coordinates: 39.8325°S 73.2678°W

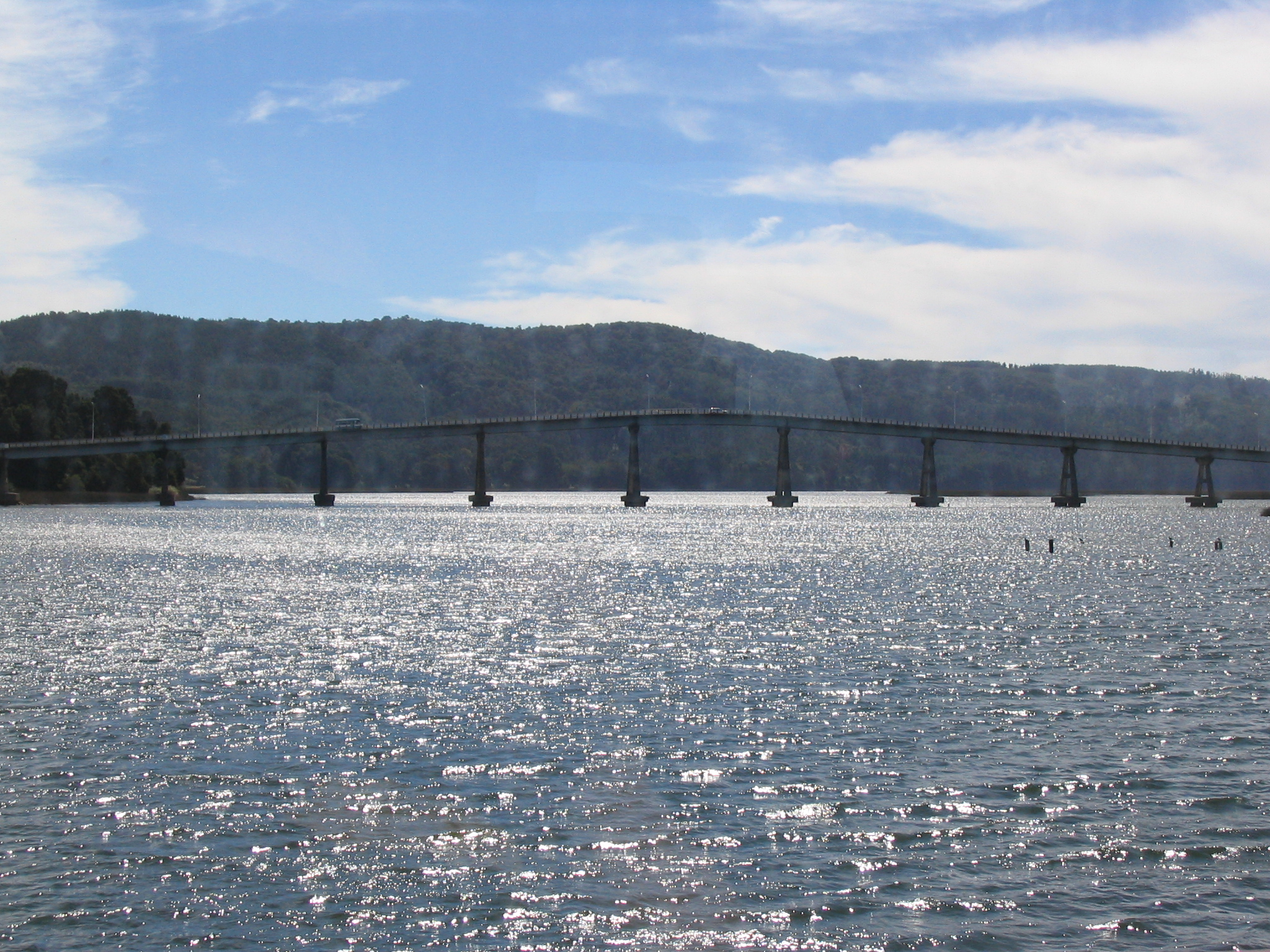
Puente Cruces, connecting Valdivia with the suburb of Torobayo

Torobayo is an affluent suburb of Valdivia, Chile. It lies west of Isla Teja and connects to the city through Río Cruces Bridge.

== History and geography ==
A former agriculture focused area outside of Valdivia, it became an industrial and residential space after the opening of the Rio Cruces Bridge in 1987. Since the early 90, with the opening of private condominiums like "Los Notros" (in 1995), "Silos de Torobayo" (2003) and "Altos del Cruces" (2004), a sizable population has established itself in the area.

Geographically speaking, Torobayo can be classified as an island since its surrounded by the Cruces River, the Valdivia River and the Estancilla River.
