= Inacayal =

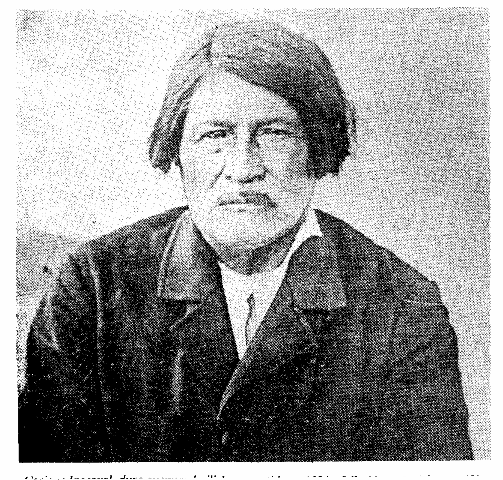
Chief Inacayal

Inacayal (c. 1835 – 1888, also transcribed as Ynacayal or Inakayal) was a cacique (chief) of the Tehuelche people in Patagonia, Argentina, who led a resistance against government. They were hunter-gatherers who had a nomadic society, and had long been independent of the Argentine government established in coastal areas. He was one of the last indigenous rulers to resist the Argentine Conquest of the Desert in the late 19th century and its resultant campaigns. He did not surrender until 1884.

His hospitality to Francisco Moreno during the explorer's 1880 expedition to Patagonia was recalled after his surrender, which was covered by the press. Moreno argued with the government on his behalf to spare Inacayal time in military prison. In exchange, Moreno studied him for anthropology. Along with others in his clan, Inacayal was studied for his resemblance to "prehistoric man."

After his death in 1888, anthropologists displayed the indigenous chief's brain and skeleton as an exhibit in the anthropological museum in Buenos Aires. His remains were finally returned to his people in 1994 for reinterment in the Comunidad Tehuelche Mapuche of Chubut Province.

An Eocene damselfly species, Inacayalestes aikunhuapi, found in Nahuel Huapi National Park, Argentina was named after him in 2015. In 2024, a Cretaceous theropod dinosaur found near Somuncurá Plateau, Argentina was named Koleken inakayali, with the specific name also honoring him.
