= Bernhard Eunom Philippi =

German naturalist, explorer and colonization agent for Chile

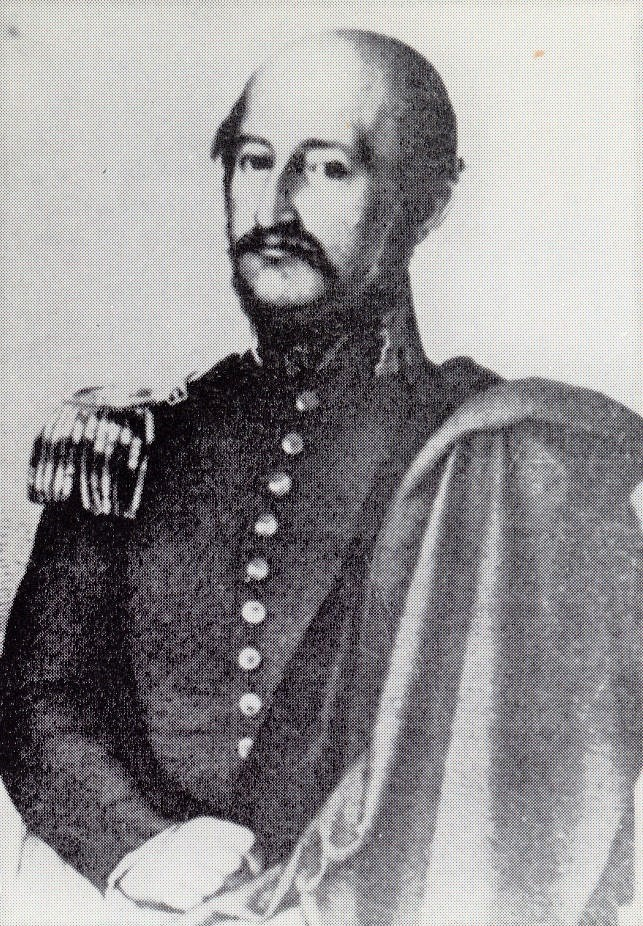
- Bernhard Philippi
- Born: 19 September 1811; Charlottenburg, Germany
- Died: August 1852 (aged 40–41); Chile
- Cause of death: Retaliatory killing

Bernhard Eunom Philippi (19 September 1811, Charlottenburg – August 1852, Chile) was a German naturalist, explorer and colonization agent for Chile. He played an important role in the Chilean colonization of the Strait of Magellan and the German colonization of Valdivia, Osorno and Llanquihue.

== Biography ==
His father was Johann Wilhelm Eberhard Philippi and his mother was Maria Anna Krumwiede. In 1818, the family moved to Switzerland, where Rudolph and his brother Bernhard entered the school of Johann Heinrich Pestalozzi. Their brother, Federico, studied natural sciences and languages. He did nautical studies on a fellowship at the port of Danzig from 1831 to 1835.

Philippi traveled to South America, where he settled in Ancud, Chile in 1838. From there he explored the south of the country. Establishing relations with civil authorities, he encouraged the idea of German colonization in Chile. On 27 August 1848, the Chile government appointed him as colonization agent and he went to Europe to recruit immigrants. In 1851 his brother, the paleontologist and zoologist Rodolfo Armando Philippi, settled in Santiago after an invitation from him.

Upon his return to Chile in 1851, Philippi was admonished by Minister of the Interior Antonio Varas for sending too many Protestant settlers; as punishment Philippi was appointed governor of the Magallanes Region instead of being appointed leader of the future Llanquihue settlement as he wished. In Magallanes, he was charged with re-establishing the colony he initially claimed for Chile but had later been destroyed in conflicts with the indigenous natives.

== Death ==
In August 1852, Philippi left with six men on a journey into the interior to speak with a tribal leader; the journey was supposed to take a few days but none of the men returned. After searches failed to find the men, in October 1852, one of the porters confessed that the men had been murdered in retaliation for an earlier killing of indigenous people; his body was never found and the exact date of his death is uncertain.

== See also ==
- Benjamín Muñoz Gamero
- German-Chilean
- Carlos Anwandter
- Vicente Pérez Rosales
