= Vicente Pérez Rosales =

Chilean politician (1807–1886)

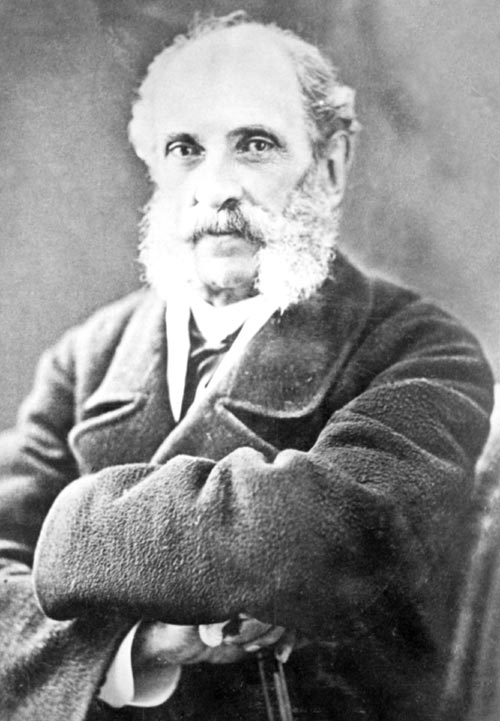

Senator of the Republic of Chile for Llanquihue
- In office 1876 – 1882

Deputy of the Republic of Chile for Chillán
- In office 1861 – 1864

Mayor (Intendant) of Concepción
- In office 1859 – 1863
- Preceded by: Rafael Sotomayor
- Succeeded by: Aníbal Pinto

Personal details
- Born: April 5, 1807 Santiago, Captaincy General of Chile, Spanish Empire
- Died: September 6, 1886 (aged 79) Santiago, Republic of Chile
- Party: National Party
- Relations: Juan Enrique Rosales (grandfather); José Joaquín Pérez (cousin); José Manuel Ramírez Rosales (cousin)
- Occupation: Politician, merchant, writer, poet, miner, diplomat

Vicente Pérez Rosales (Spanish pronunciation: [biˈsente ˈpeɾes roˈsales]; 5 April 1807 – 6 September 1886) was a politician, traveller, merchant, miner and Chilean diplomat. He is best known for his writings including his memoir Memorias del Pasado and for contributing to organize the colonisation by Germans and Chileans of the Llanquihue area. Vicente Pérez Rosales National Park is named after him.

In the 1846 he went to work in the mines near Copiapó in northern Chile, and then in 1848 Pérez Rosales was one of thousands of Chileans who participated in the California gold rush. He wrote extensively about it contrasting aspects of the North American society with the Chilean one. The Californian writings of Pérez Rosales were published in various forms having a lasting impact in discourses about Chilean identity.

== See also ==
- Carlos Anwandter
- Chan Chan (forest)
- Bernhard Eunom Philippi
- German colonization of Valdivia, Osorno and Llanquihue

== Sources ==
- Memoria chilena
