= SEM =

SEM or Sem can refer to:

== Computing ==
- Search engine marketing, promoting websites by increasing their visibility in search engine results
- Security event manager, a security log tool used on data networks

== Economics and management ==
- Stock Exchange of Mauritius, the principal stock exchange of the island country of Mauritius
- Strategic enrollment management, an element of planning for new growth at a university or college
- Samsung Electro-Mechanics, a South Korean company

== Energy ==
- Single Electricity Market, the integration of the electricity sectors of the Republic of Ireland and Northern Ireland in a single market
- Strategic energy management, continuous improvement process for energy efficiency based on behavioral change

== Mathematics and statistics ==
- Structural equation modeling, in data analysis
- Simultaneous equations model, in econometrics
- Standard error of the mean in statistics

== Places ==
- Craig Field (Alabama) (IATA code: SEM), a public airport four miles southeast of Selma, in Dallas County, Alabama
- Sem, Ariège, a former commune in the Ariège department in southwestern France
- Sem, Norway, a village in Tønsberg Municipality in Vestfold county, Norway
- Sem Municipality, a former municipality in Vestfold county, Norway

== Science and technology ==
- Scanning electron microscope
- Space Experiment Module, of the Freestar experiment on space shuttle Columbia
- Sistema Eléctrico de Magallanes, an electrical power grid of Chile
- SEM, instrument (seismometer) of the Surface Science Platform (Kazachok) mission ExoMars 2022
- A protecting group in organic chemistry, see 2-(trimethylsilyl)ethoxymethyl chloride (SEM-Cl)

== Schools, organisations, societies ==
- Society for Experimental Mechanics, an engineering professional organization.
- The School of Ecclesiastic Music the school of Byzantine Music in Mount Lebanon
- Swedish Evangelical Mission
- Society for Ethnomusicology, an ethnomusicology in Indiana, US
- Science and Engineering Magnet, a school in Dallas, Texas, US
- S.E.M. Group civil engineering company based in South Australia
- Steam Engine Makers' Society, early British trade union
- Shandong Engineering Machinery, owned by Caterpillar Inc.
- State Secretariat for Migration (Switzerland)

== People ==
- Shem or Sem, one of the sons of Noah, as depicted in the Bible
- Sem (given name), a usually masculine first name
- Sem (artist) (1863–1934), French caricaturist
- Elise Sem (1870–1950), Norwegian barrister, women's activist, and sports official
- Ingebjørg Dahl Sem (born 1938), Norwegian Christian writer
- Ingebjørg Sem (1931–2009), Norwegian actress
- John Sem (born 1973), Papua New Guinean Olympic boxer
- Niels Arntzen Sem (1782–1859), Norwegian politician
- Suy Sem (born 1947), Cambodian politician

== Other ==
- Super Étendard Modernisé, a French fighter aircraft
- Self-evaluation maintenance theory, a psychological theory of self
- Synthesizer Expansion Module, an Oberheim synthesizer
- New Austrian tunnelling method or Sequential Excavation Method
- Sports and exercise medicine
