= Electricity sector in Chile =

Electricity sector of Chile
Data
- Electricity coverage (2003): 97% (total), 90% (rural); (LAC total average in 2007: 92%); 11.5 h interruption per subscriber
- Installed capacity (2022): 33.18 GW
- GHG emissions from electricity generation (2003): 13.82 Mt CO_{2}
- Average electricity use (2007): 3,326 kWh per capita
- Distribution losses (2005): 6.52%; (LAC average in 2005: 13.6%)

Tariffs and financing
- Average residential tariff (US$/kW·h, 2004): 0.109; (LAC average in 2005: 0.115)
- Average industrial tariff (US$/kW·h, 2006): 0.0805 (LAC average in 2005: 0.107)

Services
- Sector unbundling: Yes
- Share of private sector in generation: 100%
- Share of private sector in transmission: 100%
- Competitive supply to large users: No
- Competitive supply to residential users: No (if below 2 MW)

Institutions
- No. of service providers: generation: 36, transmission: 5, distribution: 36
- Responsibility for transmission: Transelec
- Responsibility for regulation: Fuel and Electricity Superintendence (SEC)
- Responsibility for policy-setting: National Energy Commission (CNE)
- Responsibility for the environment: Ministerio del Medio Ambiente
- Electricity sector law: Yes (1982, modified in 2004 and 2005)
- Renewable energy law: Yes
- CDM transactions related to the electricity sector: 8 registered CDM projects; 2 Mt CO2e annual emissions reductions

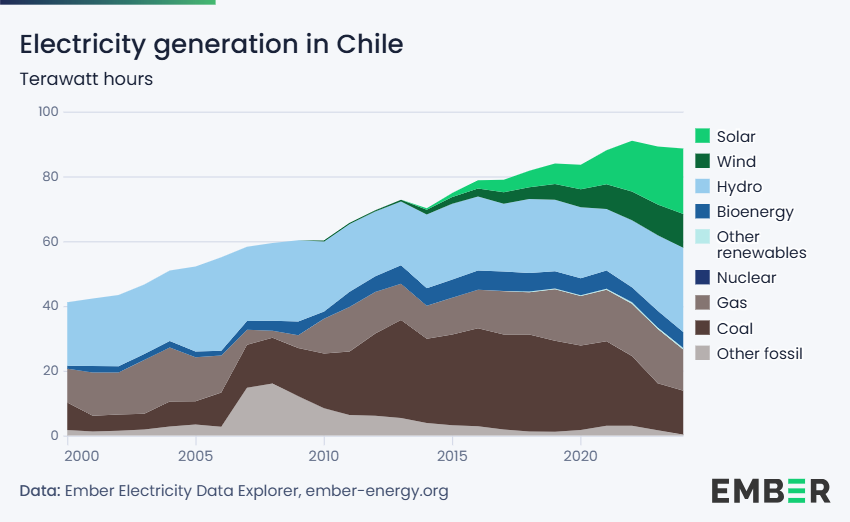
Electricity generation in Chile by source in terawatt hours

As of August 2020 Chile had diverse sources of electric power: for the National Electric System, providing over 99% of the county's electric power, hydropower represented around 26.7% of its installed capacity, biomass 1.8%, wind power 8.8%, solar 12.1%, geothermal 0.2%, natural gas 18.9%, coal 20.3%, and petroleum-based capacity 11.3%. Prior to that time, faced with natural gas shortages, Chile began in 2007 to build its first liquefied natural gas terminal and re-gasification plant at Quintero near the capital city of Santiago to secure supply for its existing and upcoming gas-fired thermal plants. In addition, it had engaged in the construction of several new hydropower and coal-fired thermal plants. But by July 2020 91% of the new capacity under construction was of renewable power, 46.8% of the total solar and 25.6% wind, with most of the remainder hydro.

Chile's electricity sector changes were carried out in the first half of the 1980s. Vertical and horizontal unbundling of generation, transmission and distribution and large scale privatization led to soaring private investment. The 1982 Electricity Act was amended three times in 1999, 2004 and 2005 after major electricity shortages. Further amendments are envisaged.

== Electricity supply and demand ==
Installed capacity by source in Chile (2022)

- Hydro: 7,280 MW (24.7%)
- Solar: 5,194 MW (17.6%)
- Coal: 4,641 MW (15.8%)
- Oil (diesel): 4,230 MW (14.4%)
- Gas: 3,902 MW (13.3%)
- Wind: 3,720 MW (12.6%)
- Biomass: 438 MW (1.5%)
- Geothermal: 39 MW (0.1%)

=== Installed capacity ===
There are four separate electricity systems in Chile:

- the Central Interconnected System (SIC, Sistema Interconectado Central), which serves the central part of the country (75.8% of the total installed capacity and 93% of the population, 15 GW capacity and 7.5 GW peak load);
- the Norte Grande Interconnected System (SING Sistema Interconectado del Norte Grande), which serves the desert mining regions in the North (23.3% of the total installed capacity, 4 GW capacity and 2.4 GW peak load); and
- the Aysén (0.3% of total capacity) and
- Magallanes (0.6% of total capacity) systems, which serve small areas of the extreme southern part of the country.

The long distances between the four systems made their integration difficult, but after the 600 km SIC-SING 500 kV AC transmission project costing US$1bn came online in May 2019, Chile's northern grid (SING) and central-southern grid (SIC) are now connected into a single national wide area synchronous grid.

Total installed nominal capacity in April 2010 was 15.94 GW. Of the installed capacity, 64.9% is thermal, 34% hydroelectric and nearly 1% wind power, with nuclear absent. The SING is mostly thermal and suffers from overcapacity, while the hydro-dominated SIC has been subject to rationing in dry years. Total generation in 2008 was 56.3 TW·h, 42% of which was contributed by hydropower sources. The remaining 58% was produced by thermal sources. This figure varies significantly from one year to another, depending upon the hydrology of the particular period. The electricity production grew rapidly since the start of natural gas imports from Argentina in the late 1990s.

Besides the new hydro projects (see Renewables section below), there are several large-scale thermal projects in the development pipeline for Chile. Numerous projects are being built, although other similar plants have been delayed due to opposition from locals and uncertainty about gas supply. It is this uncertainty that has directed new attention to coal-fired facilities, of which Chile already has several plants in operation, with a combined capacity of 2,042 MW. In addition, as of April 2010, there are plans to build new plants for a total of 11,852 MW of new generation capacity.

==== By company ====
The main companies involved, in terms of installed capacity, are the following:

- Enel Generación Chile (formerly ENDESA; 35%, 6085 MW)
- AES Andes (18%, 3157 MW)
- Colbún S.A. (15%, 2621 MW)
- Suez Energy Andino (12%, 2176 MW)
- E.E. Guacolda (3%, 610 MW)
- Pacific Hydro (3%, 551 MW)

A number of other companies account for the remaining 14% (2418 MW)

=== Imports and exports ===
In 2003, Chile imported 2 TW·h of electricity (mainly from Argentina) while it did not have any exports.

=== Demand ===
In 2007, the country consumed 55.2 TW·h of electricity. This corresponds to 3,326 kWh per capita, which is still low by developed country standards. It grew rapidly (6% per year) until 2006, but since then it has been stagnant.

=== Demand and supply projections ===
In 2006 it was expected that electricity demand would increase at 5% per year in the period up to 2030. In that same period, the share of natural gas in the generation mix would increase to 46%. The installed capacity of natural-gas-fired electricity generation was expected to reach 14 GW in 2030 (to be achieved by the construction of 10 new combined-cycle gas-fired power plants), while coal-fired and hydroelectricity generation would each account for about 26% of the total electricity generation mix. As can be seen above, by 2020 trends were quite different.

== Access to electricity ==
Total electricity coverage in Chile was as high as 99.3% in 2006. Most of the progress in rural areas, where 96.4% of the population now has access to electricity, has happened in the last 15 years, following the establishment of a National Program for Rural Electrification (REP) administered by the National Fund for Regional Development. Under this Fund, there is tripartite funding of the capital costs of rural connections: users pay 10%, companies 20% and the state provides the remaining 70%, with users expected to pay for running costs.

== Service quality ==
=== Interruption frequency and duration ===
In 2002, the average number of interruptions per subscriber was 9.8, while the total duration of interruptions per subscriber was 11.5 hours in 2005. Both numbers are below the weighted averages of 13 interruptions and 14 hours for the LAC region.

=== Distribution and transmission losses ===
Distribution losses in 2005 were 6.52%, down from 8% a decade before and well below the 13.5% LAC average.

== Responsibilities in the electricity sector ==
=== Policy and regulation ===
The National Energy Commission (CNE), created in 1978 to advise on long-term strategies, is responsible for advising the Minister of Economy on electricity policy and for setting of regulated distribution charges. The Energy Superintendence (SEC) is responsible for supervising compliance with laws, regulations and technical standards for generation, production, storage, transportation and distribution of liquid fuels, gas and electricity. In turn, the Minister of Energy formally imposes the regulated tariffs and retains control over the issuing of rationing decrees during periods of drought when there is a shortage of hydro-electric generation capacity. Further responsibilities in the electricity sector are also held by the Superintendence of Secure Values (SVS), which is in charge of taxation, as well as directly by the regions and municipalities.

=== Generation, transmission and distribution ===
Since the privatization of the Chilean electricity sector in 1980, all generation, transmission and distribution activities have been in private hands. There are 26 companies that participate in generation, although three main economic clusters control the sector: Enel group, AES Andes and Tractebel (Colbún). The situation is similar in the distribution sector, with approximately 25 companies, in which the major companies include CGE Distribución S.A., Chilectra S.A., Chilquinta Energía S.A., and Inversiones Eléctricas del Sur S.A. (Grupo SAESA). In transmission, there are 5 players. In the Central Interconnected System (SIC), the most important player is Transelec, a pure transmission company which controls almost the entire transmission grid that serves the SIC. In the other interconnected systems, the large companies generation or the large clients are the owners of the transmission systems.

The Central Interconnected System (SIC) serves principally household consumers, while the "Large North" Interconnected System (SING) mostly serves large industrial customers, primarily mining interests in Chile's northern regions. The largest generating company in the SING is Electroandina, owned by Tractebel and Codelco.

A 1,342 km (834 mi) 500 kV HVDC transmission line is under construction from Kimal (at Maria Elena in Atacama) to Lo Aguirre (Santiago) at a cost of US$2 billion.

== Renewable energy resources ==
In January 2006, new legislation was passed to apply the benefits included in Short Laws I & II (see Recent Developments section below for details) to renewable energy production. The new regulation provided for exemptions in transmission charges for new renewable energy sources (i.e. geothermal, wind, solar, biomass, tidal, small hydropower and cogeneration) below 20 MW of capacity. It also simplified the legal procedures for projects below 9 MW. Previously, besides hydro, no other renewable source had a significant contribution to the Chilean energy mix, but this has changed.

=== Hydro ===
At the end of 2021 Chile was the 28th country in the world in terms of installed hydroelectric power (6.8 GW).

Historically, hydroelectric plants have been the largest power source in Chile. Periodical droughts have, however, caused supply shortfalls and blackouts, which led the government to increase diversification in the country's energy mix in the 1990s, mainly through the addition of natural-gas-fired power plants. Nevertheless, hydropower projects continued to be carried out, with the 570 MW Endesa's Ralco plant, on the Biobio River, being the best example as the largest power plant in Chile. The construction of this plant was long delayed by opposition from local residents and environmental activists, but it finally began operations in 2004, the year when it also got the approval from Chile's environmental authority to be expanded to a capacity of 690 MW.

Furthermore, Argentina's gas crisis has revitalized other hydropower projects in Chile. In 2007–8, Chilean power generator Colbun completed three hydroelectric projects, the 70 MW Quilleco plant on the Laja River and the Chiburgo and Homito plants, with 19 MW and 65 MW generation capacity respectively. In addition, in 2007 Endesa started operating the 32 MW Palmucho plant, which is to work in conjunction with Ralco's facility. Finally, Australia's Pacific Hydro and Norway's SN Power Invest are developing the 155 MW La Higuera and the 156 MW La Confluencia hydroelectric plants on the Tinguiririca River. The controversial 2,750 MW HidroAysén project was cancelled in 2014.

=== Solar power ===
At the end of 2021 Chile was the 22nd country in the world in terms of installed solar energy (4.4 GW).

As noted above, solar power has surged, with 3.104 GW installed capacity and 2.801 GW under construction in July 2020. At a power auction in October 2015, three solar generators offered power at $65 to $68 per MWh and two wind farms offered power at $79 per MWh, vs. coal power offered at $85 per MWh, and an average price of $104.3 per MWh at an auction in 2008 with no wind or solar power offered. In the August 2016 auction, the Spanish company Solarpack was one of the winners with a proposal to sell power beginning in 2021 from a new 120 MW solar facility, Granja Solar, at $29.1 per MWh, an international record low price at the time. On March 2, 2020, Solarpack began supplying power from Granja Solar, 10 months early; rated at 123MW, this raised Solarpack's current Chilean capacity to 181MW.

=== Wind and geothermal ===
At the end of 2021 Chile was the 28th country in the world in terms of installed wind energy (3.1 GW).

In the year 2008, wind power amounted to 0.05% of the total electricity generation, but was projected to grow rapidly in coming years. By August 2020 2,242 MW, 8.8% of the National Electric System's installed generating capacity, was wind power, and wind power was also 25.6% of the 5,990 MW in additional capacity currently under construction. Because southern Chile receives prevailing westerlies of the roaring forties and furious fifties, it has some of the most promising wind power potential in the world.

At the turn of the century, there was increasing interest in the country's geothermal potential. In 2006, after a surveying campaign, a consortium formed by the National Petroleum Company (ENAP) and Enel requested a concession to develop geothermal resources in the El Tatio region in the North. In August 2020 Chile had 45 MW of installed geothermal generating capacity, 0.2% of the national generating capacity.

== History of the electricity sector ==
=== Electricity sector reform of 1982 ===
Chile represents the world's longest running comprehensive electricity reform in the post-World War II period. The reform was led by the 1982 Electricity Act, which is still the most important law regulating the organization of the electricity sector in the country. The reform was similar to the UK's model and started with vertical and horizontal unbundling of generation, transmission and distribution in 1981. According to Cambridge economist Michael Pollitt, the reform is widely regarded as a successful example of electricity reform in a developing country and has been used as a model for other privatizations in Latin America and around the world.

In the period 1970–73, Salvador Allende's government had undertaken a process of nationalization of many large companies, including utilities and banks. By 1974, inflation, high fuel prices and price controls had led to large losses and lack of investment in electric utilities, which were then under public ownership. The subsequent military dictatorship, under Augusto Pinochet, decided to reorganize the sector through the introduction of a different economic discipline. The government returned large state owned companies, including electricity, to their previous owners, an action that was followed by improving rates of return on capital. In addition, the 1985 reform of the Chilean pension fund system, which operated through Pension Fund Management Companies (AFPs), preceded the privatization of utilities, which began in 1986. By the end of the 1990s, foreign firms had gained majority ownership of the Chilean electricity system.

During the initial restructuring of the electricity industry Endesa, a state-owned company since 1944, was divided into 14 companies. Before the division Endesa had extensive generation, transmission and distribution assets throughout the country. The companies generated from Endesa's division included 6 generation companies (including Endesa and Colbun), 6 distribution companies and 2 small isolated generation and distribution companies in the South. Chilectra, privately owned since 1970, was split into 3 firms: a generation company (Gener) and two distribution companies.

The high levels of investment that have been attained since 1982 have enabled the expansion of the Central Interconnected System (SIC) from 2,713 to 6,991 MW (4.1% p.a.) and of the Northern Interconnected System (SING) from 428 up to 3,634 MW between 1982 and 2004.

=== Recent developments ===
There have been various attempts to modify the 1982 Electricity Act (Ley General de Servicios Eléctricos) with the purpose of adjusting to developments in the sector over the last 20 years. The first successful attempt happened in 1999, which led to electricity rationing after the drought of 1998–99, the worst one in 40 years, causing blackouts from November 1998 to April 1999 (with a total of 500 GW·h of electricity not being supplied). However, the most important modifications date from 2004, with Law 19,940, known as Ley Corta I (Short Law), and 2005, with Law 20,018, known as Ley Corta II (Short Law II), which sought to address some of the most pressing shortcomings of the current system. However, according to Cambridge economist Michael Pollitt, more comprehensive legislation is still needed. Major problems have resulted from the aftermath of the 2002 Argentine crisis. In Argentina, sharp economic recovery has boosted energy demand and led to power cuts. This led Argentina to unilaterally decide, in 2004, on a reduction of its gas exports to Chile, which had been subject to a 1995 treaty between the two countries. These cuts have had serious implications for Chile, leading to an expensive substitution of fuel oil for gas in the midst of a shortage of hydroelectric capacity. In addition, gas supply shortages fueled the debate for investment in expensive liquid natural gas (LNG) import facilities. Construction of the country's first liquefied natural gas re-gasification plant, at Quintero (Region V), near the capital city of Santiago, started in 2007 under the coordination of the state oil company Enap (National Petroleum Company). The partners are British Gas, with 40% of the shares, while ENAP, ENDESA and METROGAS have 20% each. The project is built under an Engineering, Procurement and Construction Contract by the Chicago Bridge & Iron company, while BG will be the long term supplier of LNG. The plant received project finance for US$1.1 billion from a consortium of international banks and is due to start operating in July 2009.

The Chilean government, as an additional response to secure electricity supply, proposed a new bill to the National Congress in August 2007. The main objective of this bill is to minimize the negative consequences derived from a generator's failure to meet its contracted supply obligations (i.e. due to bankruptcy). In such an event, the new law would mandate the rest of the generators to assume the obligations of the failed company. In addition, the National Energy Commission (CNE) has recently approved Resolution No.386, a new piece of legislation that will allow regulated final consumers to receive economic incentives to reduce their electricity demand.

In 2008, a special law for non-conventional renewable energy was approved (Ley 20.257), which requires that, from 2010 onwards, at least a 5% of the energy produced by the medium and large generator sector be from non conventional renewable energy sources. This quota will increase by 0.5% per year from 2015 onward, to reach a 10% requirement in 2024. A 2015 report addresses the challenges of the system. In 2026, Chile allowed storage systems for 15-year time-of-day power supply auctions.

== Tariffs, cost recovery and subsidies ==
=== Tariffs ===
In 2005, the average residential tariff was US$0.109/(kWh), while the average industrial tariff was US$0.0805/(kWh). These tariffs are very close to the LAC weighted averages of US$0.115 for residential consumers and 0.107 for industrial customers.

=== Subsidies ===
Electricity subsidies in Chile aim to temper the impact of rising electricity tariffs on the poorest sectors of the population. In June 2005, Law 20,040 established an electricity subsidy for poor Chilean families. As mandated by the law, the subsidy will be triggered when electricity tariffs for residential, urban or rural users face an increase equal to or above 5% during a period equal to or below six months. This measure was first applied between June 2005 and March 2006, when it targeted 40% of the total population (about 1,250,000 families). The subsidy was triggered a second time from February to March 2007, when it benefited 32,000 clients in the Second and Third Regions of the country. More recently, the government has announced a new application of the subsidy to benefit an estimated 1,000,000 households between December 2007 and March 2008. The total amount of the subsidy (US$33 million) will triple the resources committed in previous campaigns and is a response to rising electricity prices caused by the increasing use of diesel as a substitute for natural gas and the low precipitations of 2007, which have hindered hydropower generation.

== Investment and financing ==
Investment requirements in electricity generation, transmission and distribution over the period to 2030 are estimated to be between US$38–49 billion.

== Summary of private participation in the electricity sector ==
As a result of the 1982 reform of the electricity sector, 100% of generation, transmission and distribution activities in Chile are in the hands of private companies. Enel group (5223 MW; 32,8%), AES Andes (2642 MW 16,6%), Colbún (2591 MW, 16,3%) and Engie (1856 MW; 11,6%) control the largest part generation sector, in which a total of 26 companies participate. The distribution sector, with about 25 companies, is also dominated by four main groups: CGE Distribución S.A., Chilectra S.A., Chilquinta Energía S.A., and Inversiones Eléctricas del Sur S.A.(Grupo SAESA). As for transmission, Transelec is the largest owner of the transmission grid, followed by CGE transmission. There are some minor exceptions to the 100% private production of electricity, such as the case of the Chilean Air Force providing power for the Chilean installations in Antarctica.

Activity	Private participation (%)
Generation	100%
Transmission	100%
Distribution	100%

== Electricity and the environment ==
=== Responsibility for the environment ===
CONAMA (National Commission for the Environment) was created in 1994 and acts as coordinator of the Government's environmental actions. CONAMA is chaired by a Minister and is integrated by several different Ministries (e.g. Economy, Public Works, Telecommunications, Agriculture, Health, etc.) In July 2007, faced with the need for early installation of new back-up capacity in the National Interconnected System (SIC), the Energy Ministry urged CONAMA to grant maximum priority to the environmental assessment of the projects related with the installation of emergency turbines.

=== Greenhouse gas emissions ===
OLADE (Organización Latinoamericana de Energía) estimated that CO_{2} emissions from electricity production in 2003 were 13.82 million tons of CO_{2}, which represents 25% of total emissions for the energy sector. It is estimated that, by 2030, emissions from electricity generation will account for the largest share of emissions from the energy sector, 39% (some 74 million tons) of the total.

=== CDM projects in electricity ===
Currently (September 2007), there are eight energy-related registered CDM projects in Chile, with expected total emissions reductions of about 2 million tons of CO2e per year. The breakdown of the projects is as follows:

Project type	Number	Emission reductions (tCO2e/year)
Hydro	3	578,456
Cogeneration	1	2,226
Landfill gas	1	582,425
Electricity production from biomass	3	953,216

Source: UNFCCC

== Legislation ==
The main legal framework for the electricity sector in Chile is the "General Law of Electric Services (DFL-4)", a rather liberal framework which enables private investment in generation, transmission and distribution. Generation has been structured as a competitive market, whilst transmission and distribution are regulated. The Chilean model for the electricity market was very innovative in its time and has served as a model for several Latin American countries. It has allowed the Chilean company, Endesa, to expand successfully in the region. See the complete "legal framework for the electricity sector in Chile".

== External assistance ==
=== World Bank ===
Currently, the World Bank is funding a Project for Infrastructure Development in Chile. A US$50.26 million loan was approved in 2004 with the objective of increasing the effective and productive use of sustainable infrastructure services by poor rural communities from selected territories in the regions of Coquimbo, Maule, Biobío, Araucanía and Los Lagos. The project, to be completed in 2010, seeks, among other goals, to improve quality of conventional electricity services and to promote off-grid and renewable energy solutions, such as generators, solar panels and wind turbines.

=== Inter-American Development Bank (IDB) ===
The Inter-American Development Bank has provided funding for three active electricity-related projects in Chile.

- A Rural Electrification Project was approved in 2003. This project, with a total loan of US$40 million from the IDB, seeks to increase government's incentives for private investment in rural electrification. The objective is to extend the electrical networks, support auto-generation projects and assist in institutional strengthening. Projects will receive a subsidy according to the rules set for by the Ministry of Planning and Cooperation.
- A project for the Promotion of Clean Energy Market Opportunities received a US$975,000 loan from the IDB in 2006. The overall objective of the project is to increase market opportunities for small and medium enterprises and enhance their competitiveness. Promotion of the use of renewable energy and energy efficiency is to be achieved by facilitating access to financial incentives that support the use of low-carbon emitting technologies.
- The Chamua-Terruco transmission line is a 20-year concession for the construction and operation of a 200 km, 220 kV transmission line in the South of the country that was awarded to Cia. Tecnica de Engenharia Electrica ("Alusa") and Companhia Energetica de Minas Gerais ("Cemig"). The IDB approved a US$51 million loan in 2006 for the construction of this transmission line in a region that has shown strong economic growth in recent years.

== See also ==
- Energy in Chile
- Economy of Chile
- Renewable energy
- March 2010 Chile blackout
- 2011 Chile blackout
