= Renewable energy in Chile =

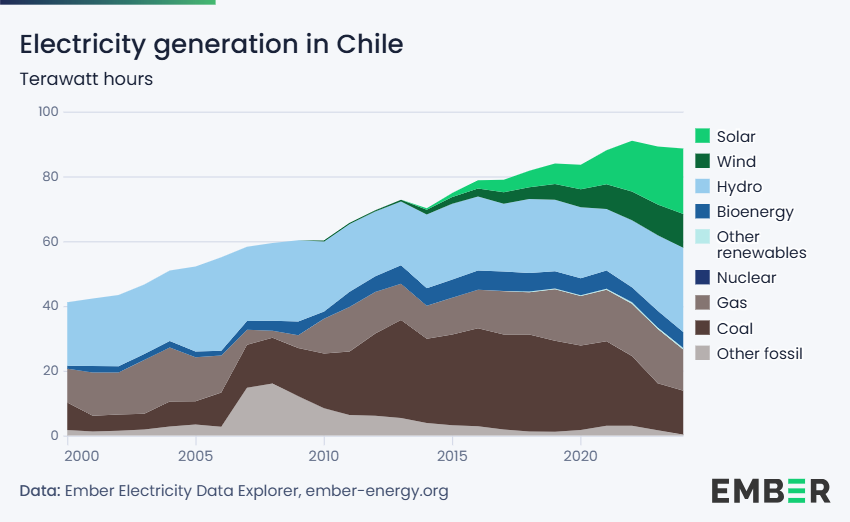
Electricity generation in Chile by source in terawatt hours

Renewable energy in Chile is classified as Conventional and Non Conventional Renewable Energy (NCRE), and includes biomass, hydro-power, geothermal, wind and solar among other energy sources. Usually, when referring to Renewable Energy in Chile, it will be the Non Conventional kind.

Chile has considerable geothermal, solar and wind energy resources while fossil fuel resources are limited. Chile has been described as "a world leader in renewable energy development." In 2024 Non Conventional Renewable Energy (wind, solar, biofuels) provided 136011.6.4TJ (37781 GWh), or 59.03% of the country's total electricity generation. NCRE accounted for 17.2% of the installed electricity generation capacity by the end of 2016.

In 2022, for the first time solar and wind energy generated more power than coal-based energy (27.5% vs. 26.5%).

== Timeline of key developments ==
2013

In 2013, with the promulgation of the law 20,698, the target was increased to 20% by the year 2025, and a new progression for the following years was defined.

2008

In 2008, the Chilean Law set the Non Conventional Renewable Energy Target to 10% by 2024. In 2013 the target was increased to 20% by 2025. The law 20,257 modified the “Electricity Services General Law” by adding the article 150° bis, which stated that every electricity company that has over 200 MW of installed capacity and that makes withdrawals from the grid, 10% of that energy has to come from Non Conventional Renewable Energy sources. This target can be accomplished by either recognizing energy from its own power plants or by purchasing energy from other NCRE power plants. If the electricity company has a surplus of NCRE, that energy can be recognized as part of the target for the next year. The same article states that if an electricity company falls short, it has to pay a fee per MWh of deficit. If the company falls short 3 consecutive years, the fee is increased by 50%. However, the company with the deficit has the option to postpone the obligation for one year only if it gives notice in advance by March of the same calendar year. The collected fee will be distributed between the final customers whose consumed energy complied with the renewable energy target.

== Non conventional renewable energy sources ==
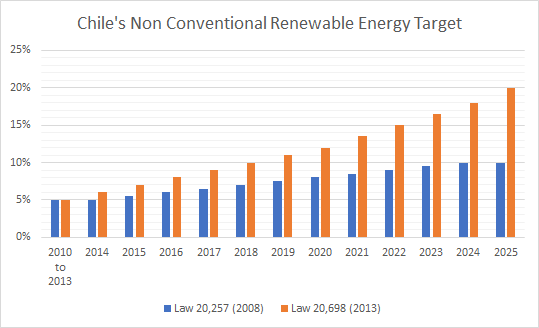

According to Chilean law (N°20,257 of 2008), the Non Conventional Renewable Energy sources are:

1. Biomass, bio-gas and waste.
2. Hydro-power, with installed capacity below 20 MW.
3. Geothermal energy.
4. Solar energy.
5. Wind power.
6. Sea power, such like wave and tidal energy.
7. Others approved by the authority, that help diversify electricity generation sources and have a low environmental impact.

=== Hydroelectricity ===
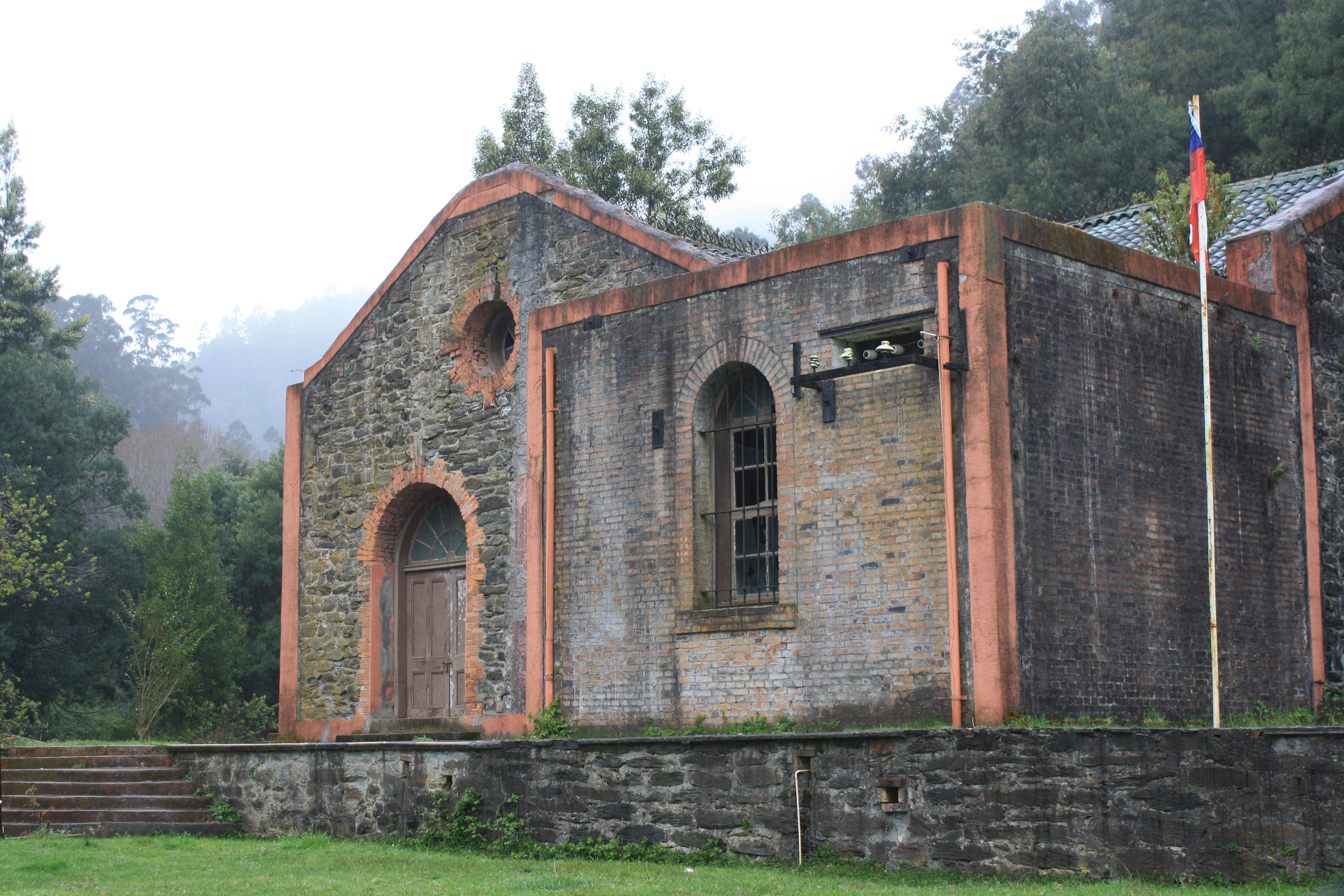
Chivilingo hydropower plant. It was the first power plant of Chile, built in 1897. It had an installed capacity of 430 kilowatts, and operated until 1975.

Hydro-power has always been an important resource in the Chilean electric grid. Historically, hydro-power has accounted for around 50% of the total electricity generation of the country. In particular, hydrology is one of the factors for seasonal variations in the electricity prices of one of the main electric grids of the country, the Sistema Interconectado Central, with seasonal droughts causing electricity prices to rise.

There are 118 hydro-power plants in the entire country totaling almost 6,460 MW of installed capacity, of which 10 plants are dams (the rest are run-of-the-river). Most of these (65% by September 2015) are classified as non-conventional renewable energy and are considered "mini hydro-power plants", as they have less than 20 MW of installed capacity.

=== Geothermal energy ===
With 15% of the world's volcanoes, Chile has vast geothermal potential, estimated at 16,000 MW. This includes the El Tatio geyser field, with 8% of the world's geysers. Chile's (and South America's) first geothermal power plant is called "Cerro Pabellón". It is located in the Atacama Desert -at around 4,500 meters (14,700 feet) above sea level -, and has a capacity of 48 MW. Cerro Pabellón belongs to Geotérmica del Norte S.A. ("GDN"), which is a joint venture between Enel Green Power Chile Ltda. and Empresa Nacional del Petróleo ("ENAP").

=== Solar energy ===
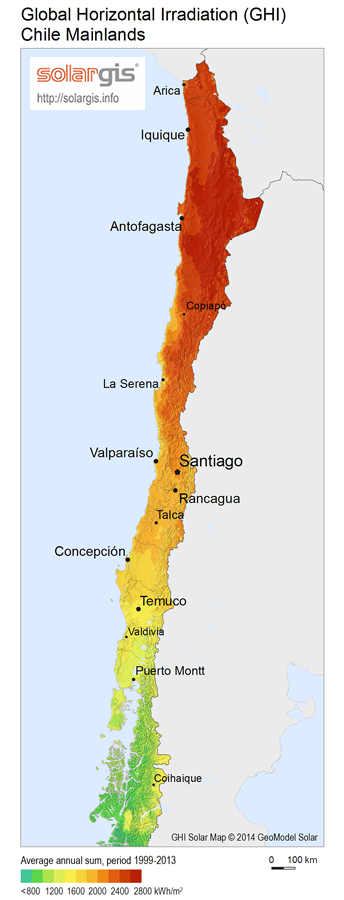
Solar radiation map of Chile

Solar power in Chile has the potential of producing all of the electricity used in Chile. Northern Chile has the highest solar incidence in the world. Chile could generate all of its electricity with about 4 percent of the Atacama desert's surface area, if there were a way to efficiently store and distribute that energy. In October 2015 Chile's Ministry of Energy announced its "Roadmap to 2050: A Sustainable and Inclusive Strategy", which plans for 19% of the country's electricity to be from solar energy, 23% wind power and 29% hydroelectric power.

The 246MW El Romero solar photovoltaic plant opened in November 2016 at Vallenar in the Atacama region It was the largest solar farm in Latin America when it opened.

In 2016, SolarPack won an electricity auction (held without disclosing bidders' power source) by bidding $29.1/MWh; a record low price.

=== Wind energy ===
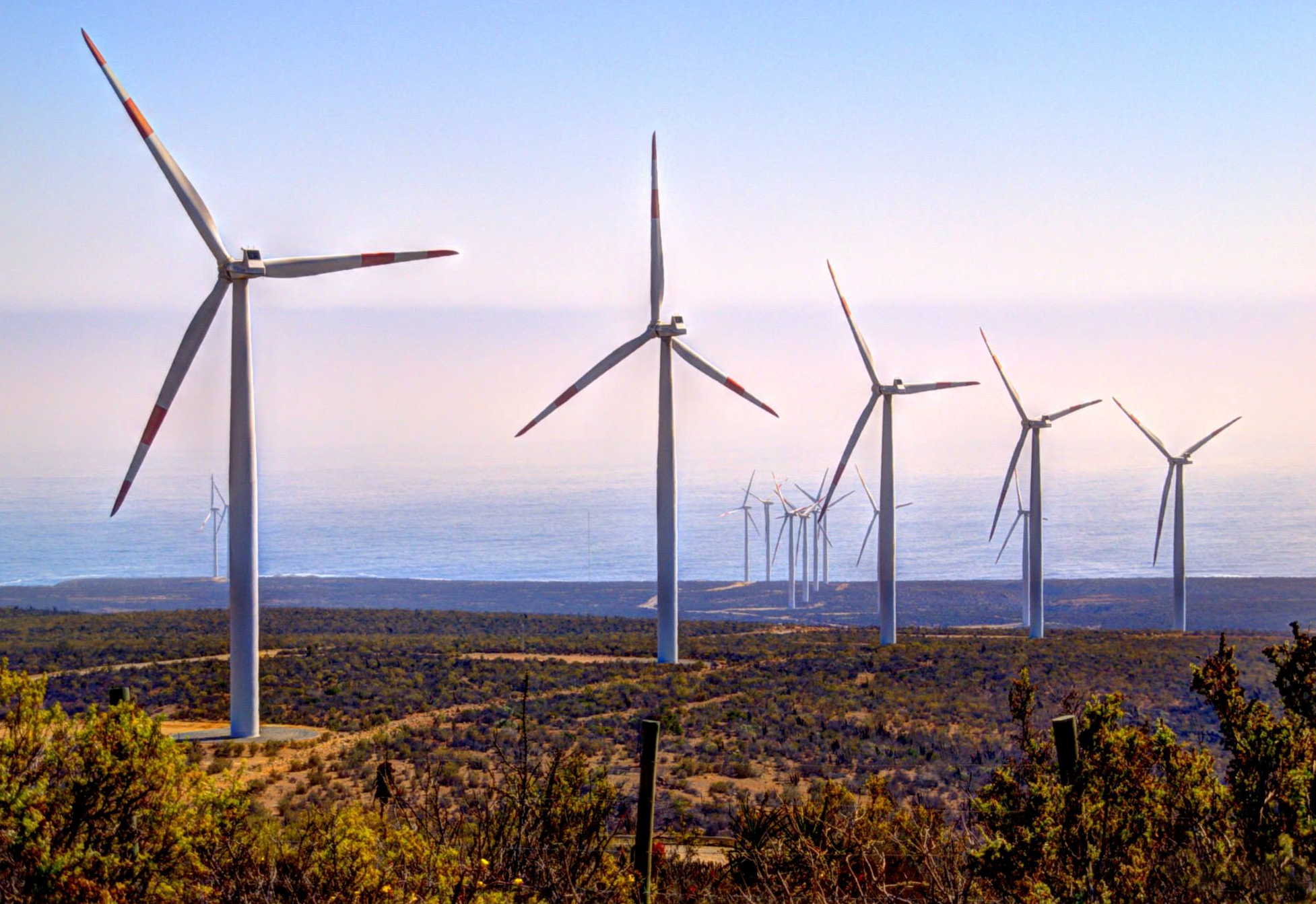
Wind farm near Canela, Chile

The 115 MW El Arrayán Wind Farm is the largest in Chile, and at the time of its inauguration in 2014 it was the largest in Latin America.

The 2016 electricity auction for a combined 12.34 TWh was won partly by wind power. Mainstream Renewable Power won 7 projects with 985 MW supplying 3.7 TWh/year at between $38.8 and $47.2 per MWh.

== Policy ==
The law 20,257 promulgated in 2008 and the law 20,698 promulgated in 2013 by the Ministry of Energy have been the main framework for the promotion of Non Conventional Renewable Energy in Chile. The first law determined the renewable energy target for Chile, and defined the concept of "Non-Conventional Renewable Energy". The target (10% by 2025) was set to start by 2010, and would only be applied to contracts signed or renewed after August 31, 2007. The second law increased the target to 20% by 2025, and modified the tender mechanism for regulated clients. The modifications facilitated the competitiveness of intermittent renewable energy sources. Because of the target, the law 20,698 is also known as "Law 20/25". Both laws were complemented with support mechanisms and investment promotion by the Ministry of Energy.

== See also ==
- Energy in Chile
- Solar power in Chile
- Geothermal power in Chile
- Renewable energy by country
