= Pedro Pierry =

Chilean judge

Personal details
- Born: 30 May 1941 (age 85) Valparaíso, Chile
- Education: The Mackay School
- Alma mater: Pontifical Catholic University of Valparaíso (LL.B)
- Profession: Lawyer

Pedro Pierry Arrau (born 30 May 1941) is a Chilean lawyer who was a member of the Supreme Court of Chile. In his country, he was known for his conflicts of interest in the approval of the HidroAysén megaproject.

From 2006 to 2010, he was Minister of the Supreme Court of Chile as well as Minister of the Qualifying Court of Elections of Chile for the period 2008−2012.

== Biography ==
From mid-1940s and 1950s, he realized his basic and secondary education at The Mackay School in Vina del Mar. Then, in 1959, he entered the Pontifical Catholic University of Valparaíso Law School, where he graduated in 1966.

In 1966−68, he started a PhD in Administrative Law at the Faculty of Law of Paris, but he never finished it. In France, he also obtained a postgraduate diploma in Public Administration in an international institute.

In January 1966, Pierry was appointed a lawyer for the State Defense Council (CDE) in the Valparaíso Attorney General's Office. Twenty five years later, in April 1991, he was appointed as advisor of the CDE, becoming president of the contentious-administrative section. Similarly, he was a member of the Consejo de Monumentos Nacionales representing the CDE in two different periods: from January 1993 and December 1995; and July 2005 and December 2006.

== Controversies ==
=== HidroAysén and Río Cuervo ===
On 4 April 2012, the Chilean Supreme Court approved the HidroAysén megaproject of the company formed by Endesa and Colbún SA, so rejected all the protection resources against it. Thus, Minister Pierry –who voted in favor of the project– then owned 109.840 Endesa shares, which acquired in 1988 and at the time of the ruling were valued at more than US$200.000. Homogeneuosly, Perry's vote was decisive in the split judgment which ended 3−2 in favour of HidroAysén. Pierry defended his performance by ensuring that the law didn't force him to disqualify himself (because he didn't have a 10% of shares or more according the 196th Article of the Organic Code of the 1980 Constitution). In that way, Pierry's action generated parliamentary complaints against his role by the Senators from the then opposition (centre-left) and from the officialism (centre-right).

Later, in May 2012, Pierry voted against the protection resources against the Río Cuervo hydroelectric project, but now the appeal was approved by the Supreme Court by three votes over two. Despite that result, the parliamentary complaints took effect and the case of Perry was led to the Ethics Committee of the Supreme Court.

On June 12, the Plenary of the Supreme Court unanimously rejected the complaints dealt with the ethics committee arguing that Minister Pierry had less participation than that established by the Art 196, No. 8 in the Constitution.

== See also ==
- HidroAysén
