= 2011 Chile blackout =

Major power outage

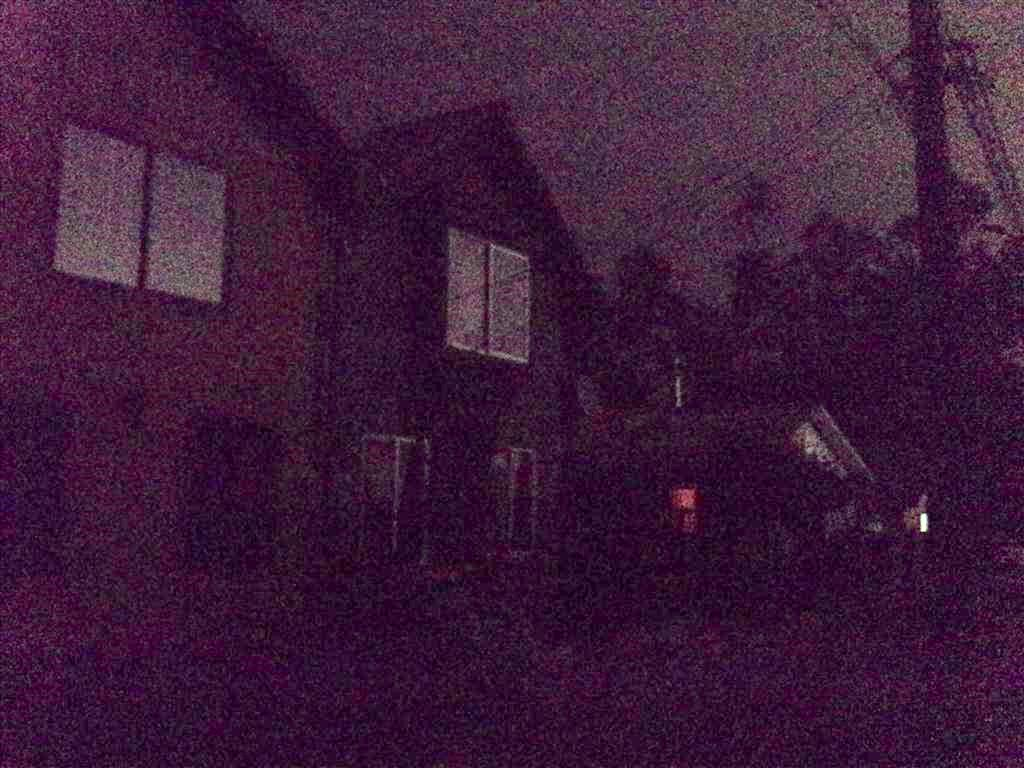
The residential neighborhood of Los Navegantes, in Pichilemu (O'Higgins Region) during the blackout.

The 2011 Chile blackout was a major power outage that occurred on 24 September 2011, approximately between 20:30 and 21:45 local time (23:30 and 00:45 UTC respectively), although the time of reinstatement varied geographically. It mainly affected the regions from Coquimbo to Maule, where the blackout was total, but it also reportedly partially affected the Atacama and Bío Bío regions. The blackout affected approximately nine million Chileans.

Chile has [es] 4 electrical interconnections that operate independently. In the blackout, the Central Interconnected System (SIC) collapsed.

Prior to the blackout, 5 transmission lines had been removed from service for maintenance.

The cause of the blackout, which started at 20:30 local time (UTC−03:00), was later determined to be equipment failure at an electrical substation. In particular, it began with a single phase short circuit. Rodrigo Álvarez Zenteno, Minister of Energy, noted a computer system malfunction and "oscillation problems" affecting two power lines. The blackout interrupted mobile phone service and forced the evacuation of thousands of rail and rapid transit passengers in Santiago, the capital city. It also delayed a concert by pop singer Ricky Martin A supermarket in Quilicura was looted, and a youth was wounded during a confrontation between the looters and police.

The outage affected operations at a number of copper mines, of which Chile is the world's top producer. The Los Bronces mine, operated by Anglo American, halted production temporarily and later, with power from generators, resumed at one-third capacity. CODELCO, Chile's state-owned copper mining company, reported that its Andina division and the El Teniente mine had lost power but continued operations using generators until power was restored.

== Investigation ==
On 6 December 2011, the Chile regulatory authority Superintendency of Electricity and Fuels (SEC) determined that the cause of the blackout was an electrical short circuit in a 220 Kilovolt capacitor bank at the Ancoa electrical substation which is located in Linares, Chile, and the subsequent malfunction of the associated protective relay equipment that should have prevented the cascading failure. SEC also determined that the time needed to restore power was prolonged by both procedural and equipment issues.

As a result of the investigation, SEC has assessed charges against the following four power companies; Transelec, Endesa (Chile), Colbún S.A., and Chilectra.

The Superintendent of the SEC, Luis Avila Bravo, said "we are making charges for not maintaining the equipment in good condition, which ultimately represents a threat to the power system security as well as for problems in applying the procedures used to restore the supply of power ".

Avila added that companies now have 15 days to respond to the charges, after which the SEC may determine sanctions, and possible fines of up to 10,000 AWU (approx. $9M US) although the final amount will depend on the merits of each investigation.

== See also ==
- 2010 Chile blackout
- 2025 Chile blackout
- Electricity sector in Chile
