= Las Animas, Chile =

Area of Valdivia, Chile

Coordinates: 39°49′S 73°13′W

Las Ánimas, is an industrial and residential neighborhood located on the northern side of Valdivia

Its main access points are: From the north, through route T-202 and the Puente Santa Elvira and through the south, Puente Calle-Calle. It is also connected to Teja Island, by the Cau-Cau bridge.

== History ==
The beginnings of the area date to the foundation of Valdivia in 1552, when the Spanish conquistador Pedro de Valdivia crossed from present-day Las Animas to Valdivia

During the re-founding of the city by the Spaniards, around 1645, a fortification was erected on the "Los Castaños" area as way of defending themselves from the attack of the indigenous population, however this emplacement was destroyed on December 25 of that year.

The toponym of the area (Ánima, derived from the Latin word alma) is said to be a reference to the "souls" of the Spanish soldiers that died during the destruction of the fortification.

By the early 1820s, this area of the city started a transformation process focused on agriculture and industrial development which continued through the years of the German colonization process but abruptly ended after the 1960 Valdivian Earthquake, which destroyed factories, residential areas and the main connection point, the Calle Calle Bridge. In 1996, and due to the increase in pedestrian and vehicular traffic, a secondary bridge of the same name was opened.

== Institutions and Public Services ==
This part of the city is somewhat well equipped in regards to public service institutions of which, the most important are:

- Centro de Salud Familiar Las Animas (CESFAM)
- «Agustín Edwards Ross» 2nd. Firefighter Company
- Inacap Valdivia
- Aeródromo Las Marías (Club Aéreo de Valdivia).

== Industries. ==
- Asenav (Shipbuilding and maintenance)
- Infodema (Wood and pulp)

== See also ==
- Puente Calle-Calle
