= 2010 Chile blackout =

Power outage in Chile

Blackout: before and after

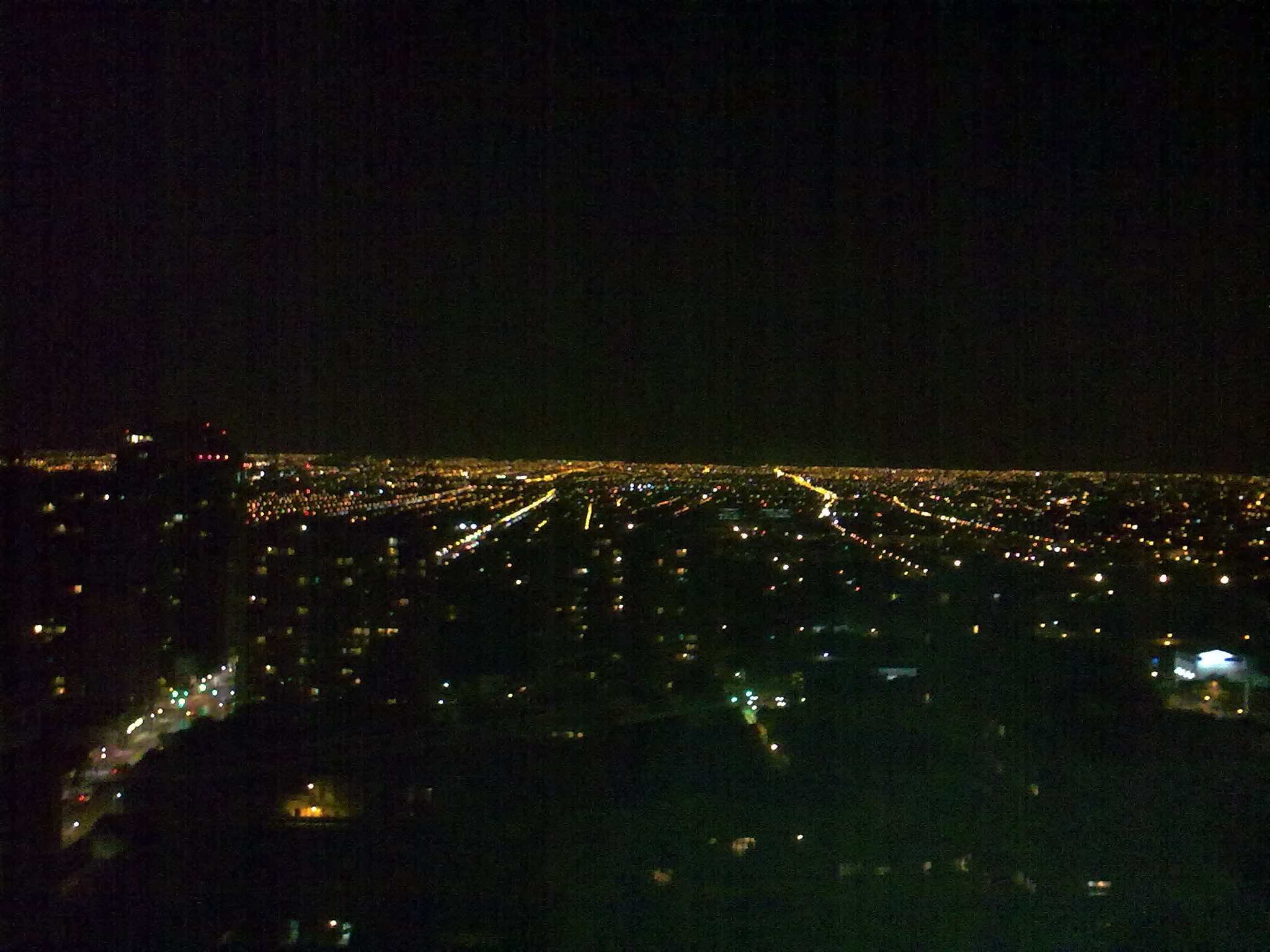
Southern Santiago prior to blackout.

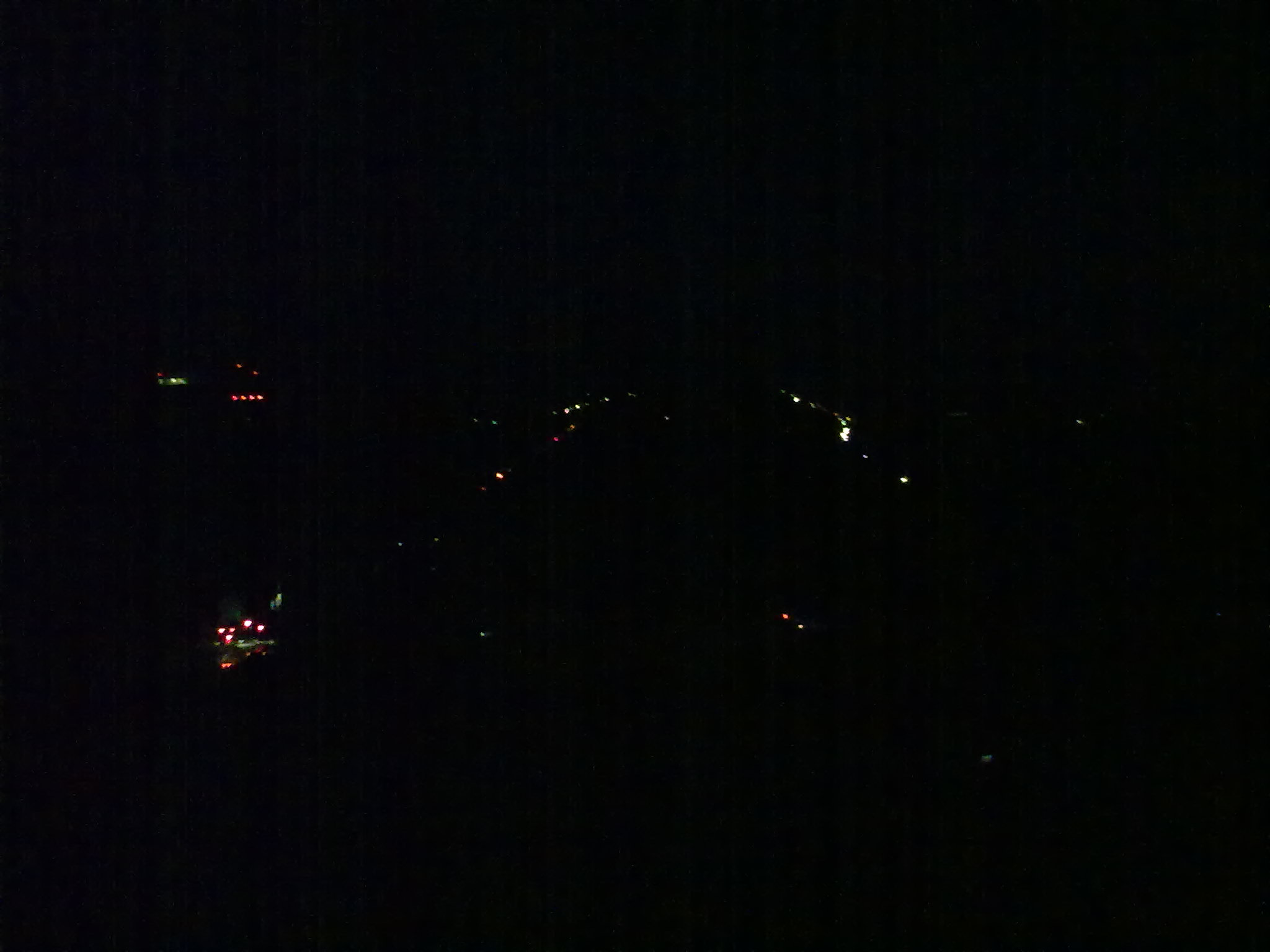
Southern Santiago during the blackout.

The 2010 Chile blackout was an electric power outage that affected most of Chile on March 14, 2010. It began at 8:44 pm (23:44 GMT) on Sunday and continued into the next day. The power was restored in a few hours in some areas, and by midnight in most areas, except in the Biobío Region.

The blackout was caused by a failure of a 500 kV transformer at a substation in southern Chile that is part of the Central Interconnected System (SIC). The affected transformer is located around 700 kilometres (430 mi) south of the capital, Santiago. The SIC serves about 93% of the country's population, from Taltal in the north to the Chiloé Island in the south, including Santiago. At one point Santiago was receiving only 8% of the electricity normally required.

The blackout interrupted a music concert being held to raise funds for the survivors of the earthquake that had devastated the country two weeks earlier. In addition, thousands of people had to be rescued from the Santiago Metro after 20 trains were immobilised and the telephone network was also affected. The fire brigade had to free several people trapped in elevators.

The blackout affected 90% of the population and electric service began to be restored after an hour. Around 98% of people affected had service restored by March 15, 2010. The blackout caused the share price of the Enersis mining group to fall by 1% to a three-month low, although loss of production was minimal there and at other mining companies in the country because of backup generators.

President Sebastián Piñera blamed the power failure on the recent earthquake and said the SIC would remain unstable for a week. Other officials stated that the outage was not directly related to the earthquake. The energy minister, Ricardo Raineri, said that the electric transmission grid remains in a fragile state and asked Chileans to restrict their use of electricity. Raineri stated that during the earthquake the "electricity network suffered various damages, be it in transformers, switches and others".

An investigation was started to determine if the failure was due to a lack of maintenance of the transformer. Piñera vowed to get the transformer repaired within 48 hours of the blackout and to get affected transmission lines checked and repaired within seven days.

== Blackout investigation ==
On August 2, 2010, the Chile regulatory authority Superintendency of Electricity and Fuels (SEC) determined that while the blackout was initiated by the equipment failure, the root cause was a widespread lack of coordination between the various companies in the day-to-day operations of the electricity sector. As a result, the SEC laid charges against all 115 companies involved in the electrical sector.

The charges were as follows:

- Each company did not coordinate its day-to-day operations to account for possible events, such as unforeseen transmission line failures.
- Each company did not coordinate any necessary actions with others in the electrical system to ensure the safety of the overall electrical system.
- Each company did not ensure the safe and efficient operation of the electrical system according to the established general criteria.
- Each company did not have established procedures in place for coordinated operation with other companies when needed to ensure system security or when required to maintain quality of service.

Additional charges were filed against Endesa (Chile), Transquillota, CHILECTRA, and TRANSELEC for either equipment failures in owned facilities or for failure to provide adequate information to Chile's central electrical grid system operator, Center for Economic Load Dispatch (CDEC-SIC). Further charges were also laid for issues at the Alto Jahuel high voltage electrical substation, located south of Santiago, which led to undue delays in recovery of the Metropolitan Region.

The Superintendent of the SEC, Patricia Chotzen, said that "after the technical analysis of the background, as part of a complex investigation, we decided to press charges against the companies involved whom have not made the necessary arrangements, referred to in our regulations."

Asked about whether the blackout may have been caused by the earthquake which had occurred two weeks previous, Chotzen said that "after an event of the magnitude of the earthquake of February, the companies had a duty to increase their level of coordination to avoid a collapse like this one. It is the duty of the utilities that provide a service as fundamental as electricity to ensure continuous and safe supply." The current legislation provided for fines of up to 10 000 AWU.

== See also ==
- 2025 Chile blackout
- 2011 Chile blackout
- Electricity sector in Chile
