= 2025 Chile blackout =

Major nationwide power outage

2025 Chile Blackout
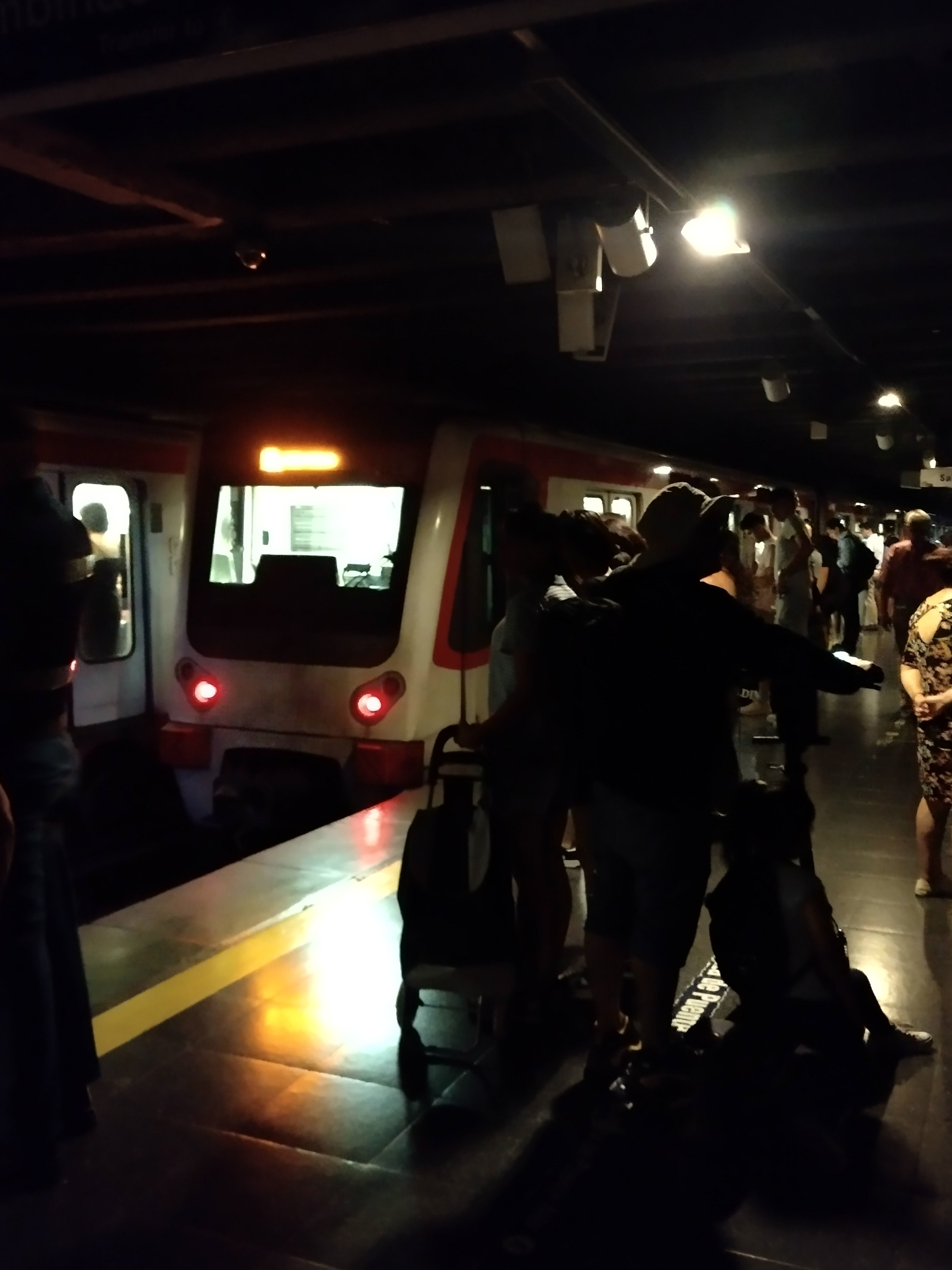
- Tobalaba station of the Santiago Metro during the initial minutes of the blackout
- Date: 25 February – 13 March 2025
- Time: 3:16 PM – 12:59 PM (CLT)
- Location: Chile (nearly nationwide)
- Type: Power outage
- Cause: Malfunction in electronic and software protection systems, leading to the disconnection of a high-voltage transmission line. (see § Cause below)
- Outcome: Over 90% of the population affected; disruptions and shutdowns of critical infrastructure, services, and industries. (see § Impact below)

The 2025 Chile blackout was a major power outage that occurred on 25 February 2025, affecting over 90% of the population of Chile and causing widespread disruptions to critical infrastructure, services, and industries across the country.

In response, President Gabriel Boric declared a state of emergency, imposed an overnight curfew from 10:00 PM on 25 February to 6:00 AM the following day, and initiated an investigation into the causes of the outage. By 26 February, power had been restored to approximately 94% of households, although some areas continued to experience intermittent outages.

The blackout was attributed to electricity distributor ISA Interchile, a subsidiary of the Colombian state-owned company ISA. A malfunction in electronic and software protection systems led to the disconnection of a critical 500 kV high-voltage transmission line between the Vallenar and Coquimbo power stations in the Norte Chico region. This caused a disturbance in the national power system, triggering a near-nationwide blackout, while other power stations repeatedly failed in their attempts to come back online.

== Overview ==
At 3:16 p.m. CLT (18:16 UTC) on 25 February 2025, Chile experienced a widespread power failure that extended from the northernmost Arica y Parinacota Region, bordering Peru, to the Los Lagos Region in the south. Fourteen of the nation's sixteen regions were affected. The national emergency management agency, SENAPRED, confirmed the extensive nature of the blackout in an official statement. The sudden loss of electricity prompted an immediate emergency session by government authorities to coordinate crisis management efforts. The outage affected up to 98% of the country's population. President Gabriel Boric stated that eight million homes lost electricity. Power was restored to 90% of consumption by 26 February. Interior Minister Carolina Toha reported that three individuals dependent on electricity died during the blackout, with authorities investigating the circumstances of their deaths.

The only two regions spared from the outage were the Aysén Region and Magallanes Region, the two southernmost regions of Chile, with a combined population of less than 300,000 as of the 2017 census.

== Impact ==
=== Mining ===
The power outage significantly disrupted Chile's mining industry. Codelco, Chile's state-owned copper corporation, confirmed that all of its mining operations throughout the country had been affected by the electrical failure. This included Escondida, the world's largest copper mine. The company implemented emergency protocols to ensure worker safety and protect facility infrastructure.

=== Transportation ===
The power failure severely impacted transportation networks across Chile. The Santiago Metro suspended all subway services throughout the capital, while Arturo Merino Benítez International Airport activated emergency power systems to maintain essential operations. Empresa de los Ferrocarriles del Estado, Chile's state-owned railway company, halted all long-distance train services operating from Santiago toward southern destinations. In Santiago, the blackout reduced the percentage of functional traffic lights to 27%. At least two road accidents were attributed to the outage.

=== Major events ===
The blackout forced the cancellation of the third night of the 64th Viña del Mar International Song Festival, which was rescheduled. The second day of the 2025 Chile Open continued despite transmission interruptions; however, the matches scheduled for broadcast at night had to be rescheduled.

Twelve people were left stranded on a rollercoaster that stopped mid-operation in the Fantasilandia amusement park in Santiago.

The blackout also forced the rescheduling of the Deportes Concepción versus Unión Española football match in the Copa Chile.

== Cause ==
Immediately following the power failure, electrical service providers initiated operations to identify the source of the outage and begin restoration procedures.

The investigation attributed the failure to energy distributor ISA Interchile, a subsidiary of Colombian state-owned ISA. ISA Interchile, the National Electrical Coordinator (Chile's grid operator), and Interior Minister Carolina Tohá indicated the blackout was triggered by a malfunction in electronic and software protection systems, which caused the disconnection of a critical backbone 500 kV double-circuit high-voltage transmission line in the Norte Chico area, between the Vallenar and Coquimbo power stations, which carries power from the Atacama Desert in northern Chile to the capital, Santiago. The disconnection led to a disturbance in the national power system, resulting in a nearly nationwide power shutdown, as other power stations failed repeatedly when attempting to come back online.

== Chilean government response ==
In response to the crisis, Interior Minister Carolina Tohá announced an emergency meeting of COGRID Nacional, the government committee responsible for addressing national disasters. The committee was tasked with implementing measures to manage the emergency and coordinate efforts to restore electrical service. A state of emergency and a curfew in affected areas lasting from 10:00 PM on 25 February to 6:00 AM on 26 February were declared by President Gabriel Boric, who also criticized private companies operating the electricity grid, despite ISA Interchile being owned by a foreign government. The Interior Ministry also deployed the military to ensure order. An additional 150 buses were deployed to compensate for the stoppage of the Santiago Metro.

== See also ==
- 2010 Chile blackout
- 2011 Chile blackout
- Electricity sector in Chile
