= Central San Pedro =

Coordinates: 39.761078°S 72.584047°W

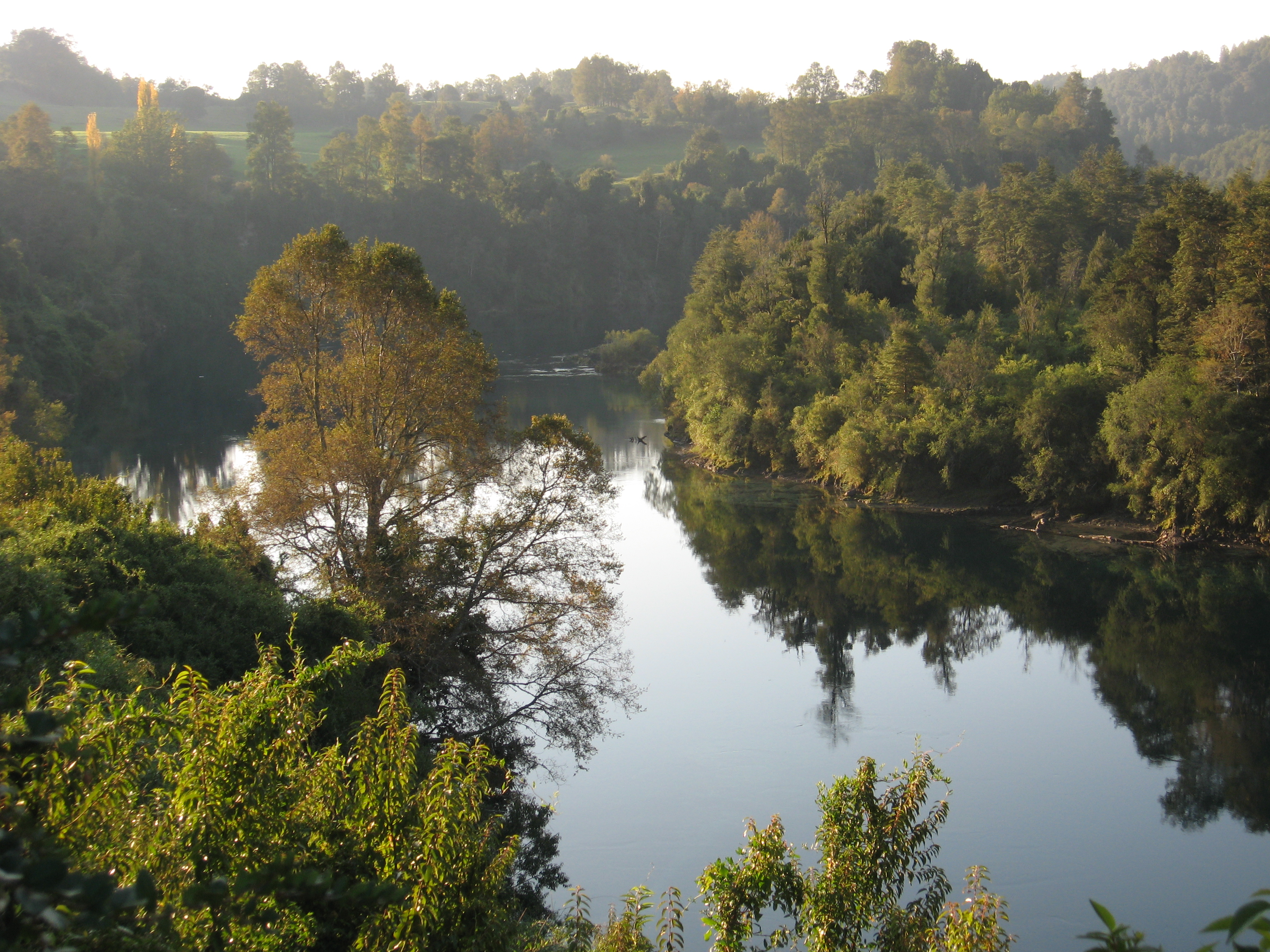
View of San Pedro River a few kilometers downstream from the proposed dam site.

Central San Pedro is a controversial energy project that aims to build a hydroelectric power plant in San Pedro River, Los Ríos Region, Chile. The dam and associated infrastructure would generate 170 megawatts (230,000 hp). The project was halted in 2009 due to problems associated with the area's geology, but then reactivated in 2019.

As of 2019 the municipalities of Panguipulli and Los Lagos, the two most directly affected communes, have rejected the project. The mayor of Los Lagos, among other people, has expressed concerns over its mpact on tourism and biodiversity. On September 7, 2019, three or more armed persons attacked the project's temporary installations, setting the storehouse ablaze. Within a week, Colbún S.A. had responded by filling legal actions against those responsible.

In September 2022 the project was put on hold as Colbún S.A. declared it was not continuing with the legal proceedings for its establishment.

Scheme showing the position of San Pedro River in the Valdivia River basin. Lakes are shown in green.

== See also ==
- HidroAysén
