= Colbún Hydroelectric Plant =

Hydroelectric power station in Chile

Coordinates: 35.6745°S 71.3454°W

Colbún Hydroelectric Plant is a hydroelectric power station in Maule Region, Chile. The plant uses water from Colbún Lake and produces 400 megawatts (540,000 hp) (or 474 MW) of electricity. The plant was built by ENDESA in 1985 (40 years ago) and is run by Colbún S.A.
