= Sistema Interconectado del Norte Grande =

The Sistema Interconectado del Norte Grande (Spanish for Interconnected System of Norte Grande) or SING was an alternating current power grid serving the Norte Grande zone of Chile from 1987 until its merger with Sistema Interconectado Central to form Sistema Eléctrico Nacional in 2017. It produced 19% of the national power generation. The SING covered the three northernmost regions of Chile: Arica y Parinacota, Tarapacá and Antofagasta.

The system begun to operate in November 1987 and was operated jointly by the electric transmission company EDELNOR and the mining company Codelco until 1993, when Centro de Despacho Económico de Carga (CDEC) took charge of the operation. In its beginnings the SING had almost all of its energy produced by thermal power plants at the coast.

As of December, 2011, it had a total installed capacity of 4,550 MW (gross)

== Bibliography ==
- Illanes Rojas, Sergio Francisco (2025). "Aporte de la gran minería del cobre al Sistema Eléctrico de la Zona Norte (1915-2020)". In Arenas Coronil, Carlos (ed.). Historia de la Energía en la Región del Sol (in Spanish). RIL Editores. pp. 113–140. ISBN 978-956--01-1706-9.
- Arenas Coronil, Carlos; Galaz-Mandakovic, Damir (2025). "Desde la ex-ENDESA al sistema eléctrico Tarapacá y la conexión al SING (1943-2020)". In Arenas Coronil, Carlos (ed.). Historia de la Energía en la Región del Sol (in Spanish). RIL Editores. pp. 113–140. ISBN 978-956--01-1706-9.
