= Sem (given name) =

Sem is a masculine given name. The Dutch name is the Biblical Shem (son of Noah) and perhaps sometimes a variant of the West Frisian name Sjamme. People with the name include:

- Sem Benelli (1877–1949), Italian playwright, essayist and librettist
- Sem Braan (born 1979), Dutch kickboxer
- Sem De Ranieri (1888–1979), Italian sports shooter
- Sem Dresden (1881–1957), Dutch conductor, composer, and teacher
- Sem Dresden (writer) (1914–2002), Dutch literary critic, Romance linguist and essayist
- Sem Hartz (1912–1995), Dutch engraver and graphic designer
- Sem Moema, British politician
- Sem Robberse (born 2001), Dutch baseball player
- Sem Sæland (1874–1940), Norwegian physicist
- Sem Schilt (born 1973), Dutch kickboxer
- Sem Shilimela (born 1991), Namibian wrestler
- Sem Vermeersch (born 1968), Belgian Koreanist
- Sem de Wit (born 1995), Dutch footballer

== See also ==
- Sem (artist), pseudonym of French caricaturist Georges Goursat (1863–1934)
- Sem (disambiguation)
