= Patagonia Sin Represas =

The phrase Patagonia Sin Represas means Patagonia without dams. It's the slogan of people and groups who opposed the 2008 HidroAysén hydroelectric dam project in Chile's Aysén Region. The Aysén region is the XI region in Chile, home to Chile's portion of Patagonia, the least populated region. The terrain is characterized by coastal mountains, rolling hills, fjord land, and large glaciers. The annual rainfall in certain parts of the region can exceed 300 inches. The region is home to Patagonian Southern Ice Sheet, the third largest ice sheet behind Greenland, and Antarctica.

The campaign was created by a coalition of concerned parties under the auspices of Consejo de Defensa de la Patagonia (CDP, or Patagonia Defense Council).

Their permits and the project was cancelled in June 2014, in part due to the seven year campaign.
