= Calle-Calle Bridge =

Bridge in Valdivia, Chile

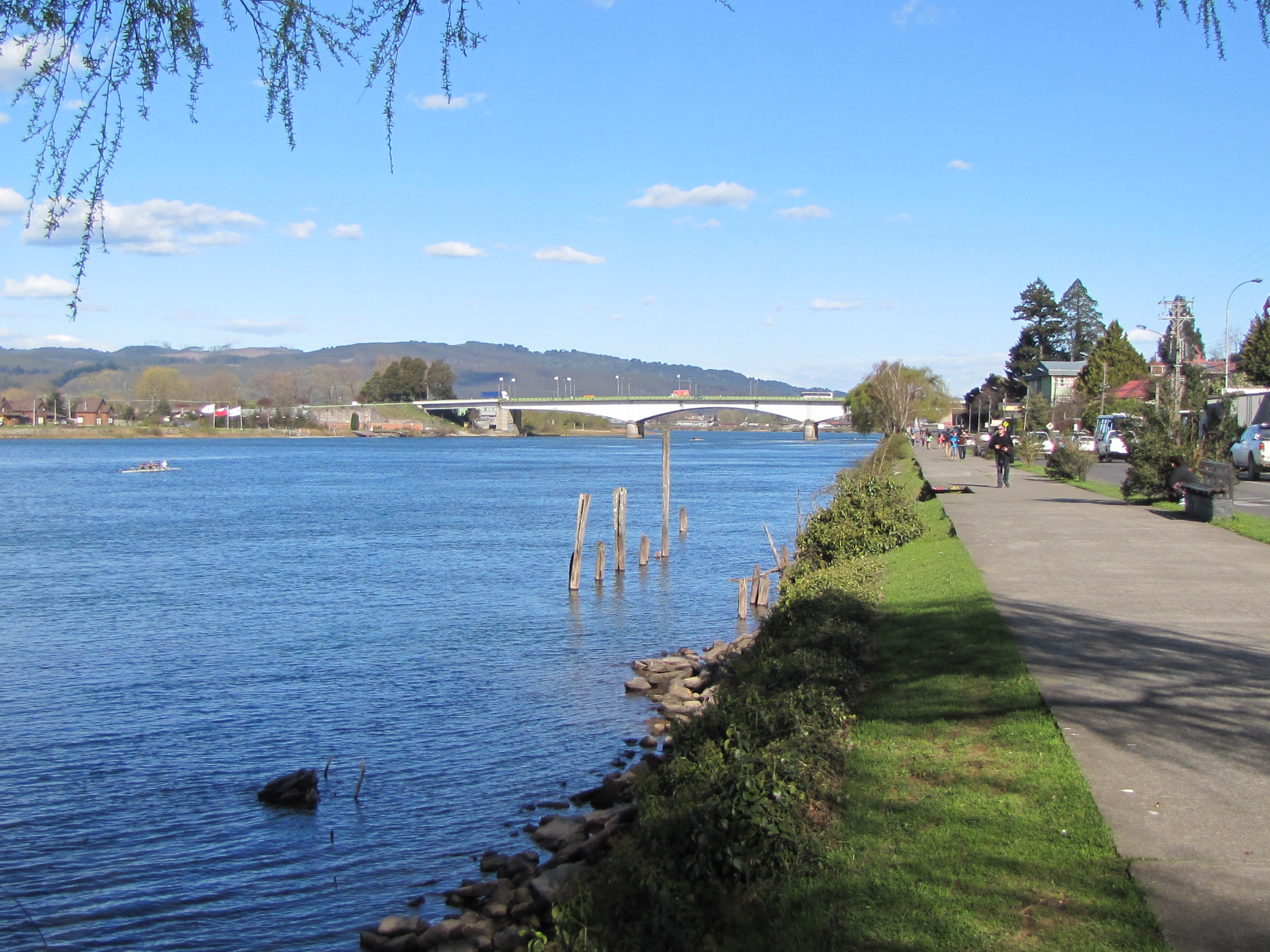
- Calle-Calle Bridge seen from downtown
- Coordinates: 39°49′06″S 73°13′45″W
- Crosses: Calle-Calle River
- Locale: Valdivia, Chile and Las Animas, Chile
- Official name: Puente Calle-Calle
- Maintained by: Valdivia municipality

Characteristics
- Design: Arch

Location
- Interactive map of Calle-Calle Bridge

Calle-Calle Bridge is an arch bridge spanning Calle-Calle River, that separates downtown Valdivia from Las Animas, a residential area of the city. It allows connection from Valdivia to the airport of Pichoy and to the Pan American Highway.

It was inaugurated on 21 February 1945 after several years of construction.

== History ==
In the 1940s, the population of Las Ánimas was mostly laborers, who worked in the same area and preferred to live there over the problems that brought commuting from downtown Valdivia before the bridge's construction was finished.

The construction of the bridge was approved by the municipality in 22 July 1938, after the neighbors of the area started a Pro-Bridge Committee in 1935. Construction proper started on 18 December 1938, and the bridge was officially inaugurated on 21 February 1945. The first vehicle to pass through it was the fire engine of the Fire Department's 8th Company.
