= San Pedro River (Chile) =

Coordinates: 39.8528°S 72.7589°W

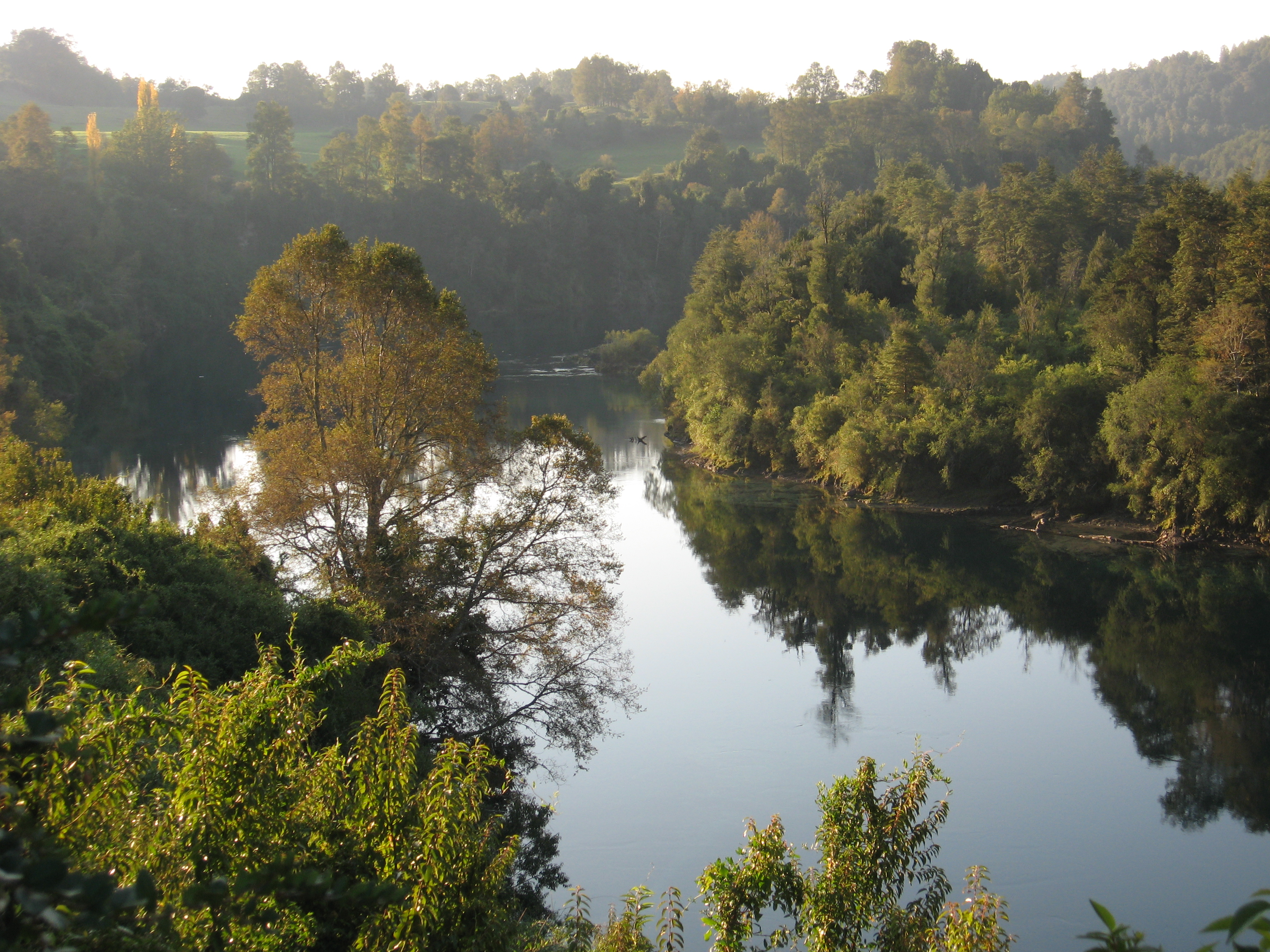
- Native name: Río San Pedro (Spanish)

Location
- Country: Chile

Physical characteristics
- Source
  - location: Riñihue Lake
- Mouth
  - location: Calle-Calle River
- Length: around 77 km (48 mi)

San Pedro River (Spanish: Río San Pedro) is a river in Valdivia Province, southern Chile. It drains waters from the Riñihue Lake, the last of the Seven Lakes, to the Calle-Calle River, which in turn changes name to Valdivia River and at the end outflows in Corral Bay. San Pedro River is well known for being a good fishing area and a good place to practise rafting.

Central San Pedro is a controversial hydroelectrical dam project in the river.
