= Calle-Calle River =

Coordinates: 39°48′07″S 73°12′45″W

Calle-Calle River Gudalafquén (Mapudungun)
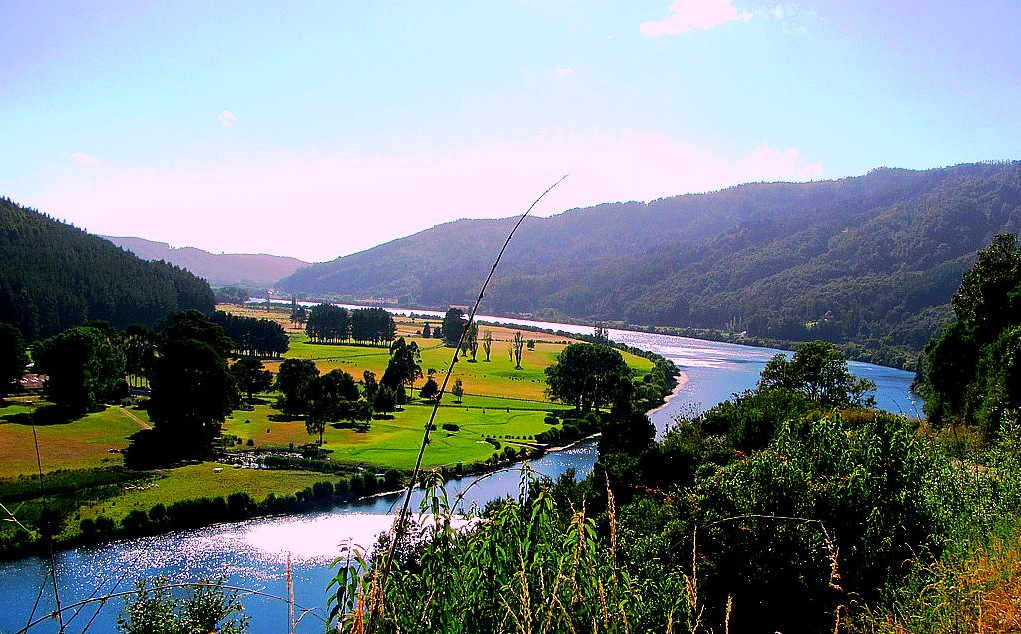
- View of Calle-Calle River a few kilometers upstream from Valdivia
- Native name: Río Calle-Calle (Spanish)

Location
- Country: Chile

Physical characteristics
- Source
  - location: San Pedro River
- Mouth
  - location: Valdivia River
- Length: 55 km (34 mi)

Calle-Calle River, also called Gudalafquén in Mapuche language, is a river in Valdivia Province, southern Chile. It drains waters from the San Pedro River to the Valdivia River, which in turn flows into Corral Bay on the Pacific Ocean.

The river's name derives from the Mapuche word for the flower Libertia chilensis.

The Calle-Calle is among the few rivers in Chile that are considered navigable. The Calle-Calle and Santa Elvira bridges crosses the river in the city of Valdivia.

The city of Valdivia obtains most of its water supply from Calle-Calle River near Cuesta Soto. Decreasing precipitation has caused the river to be contaminated with saline water from the coast. The effects of saline water entering the water supply of Valdivia were particularly noticeable in 2015 when there was a surge in complains about the taste of the water. The saltwater in the rivers near Valdivia during autumn is expected to increase in the future. Estimations indicate that whenever the sum of the water discharge of Cruces and Calle-Calle rivers falls below 74 m^{3}/s (2,600 cu ft/s) saltwater reaches the supply site at Cuesta Soto.

Diagram showing rivers and lakes of the Valdivia River basin.
