= Sistema Eléctrico de Aysén =

The Sistema Eléctrico de Aysén (SEA; Spanish for Electric System of Aysén) is an alternating current power grid serving the Aysén del General Carlos Ibáñez del Campo Region of Chile. It is operated by a private company called EDELAYSEN, whose motto is La Luz del Sur (Spanish for The Light of the South).

Of the four main electric grids in Chile, the SEA has the largest share of renewable energy; constituted by 54.2% thermoelectric, 41.7% hydroelectric, and 4.1% wind power. The SEA has three wind turbines which collectively produce 2 MW. Despite being amongst the four largest grids in Chile, the SEA accounts for only 0.3% of the national coverage, powering approximately 26,000 homes and supplying approximately 105.7 GWh.

As of November, 2010, it had a total installed capacity of 50 MW (gross)
