= El Arrayán Wind Farm =

Wind farm in Chile

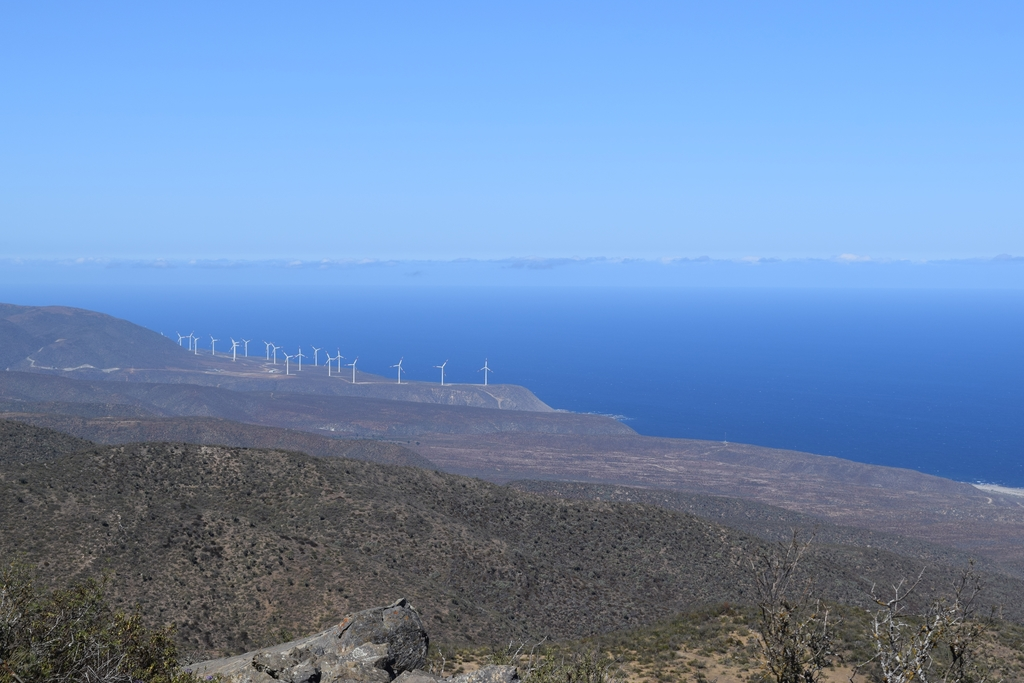
View of El Arrayán Wind Farm, located on the slopes of the Chilean Coastal Range

The 115 MW El Arrayán was the largest wind farm in Chile. At the time of its inauguration in 2014, it was the largest in Latin America.

== Background ==
The site is approximately 400 km north of Santiago in the coastal town of Ovalle, which is the capital of the Limarí Province, in the Coquimbo Region. The project consists of 50 Siemens 2.3 MW wind turbines. It completed in June 2014 and officially went into service in August 2014. Pattern Energy owns 70% of the facility, which it also operates. Antofagasta Minerals SA owns the remaining 30% minority stake.
