= Strategic energy management =

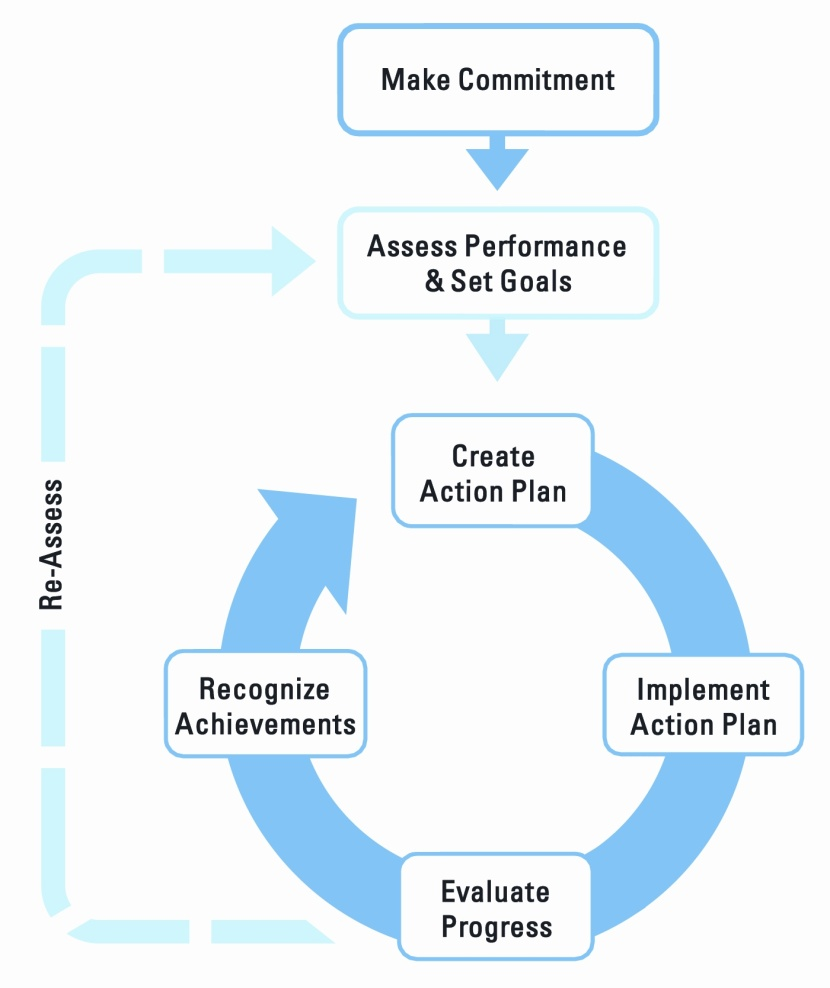
Energy Star's Guidelines for energy management, a commonly referenced process for implementing SEM

Strategic energy management (SEM) is a set of processes for business energy management. SEM is often deployed via programs that target the businesses or other organizations within a utility territory or a government area. SEM is codified in the ISO 50001 standard for energy management systems.

== Energy benefits ==
The main goal of SEM is to help a company achieve continuous improvement in its energy performance over a longer-term period. Some energy benefits of SEM include reduced energy consumption through improved energy efficiency and energy conservation, improved peak demand management and reduced demand charges, decreased overall energy cost, reduced energy costs, greenhouse gas (GHG) emissions and improved reliability through integration of distributed energy resources (e.g. onsite renewables, localized energy storage, combined heat and power), and improved electrical price stability and reduced GHG emissions through integration of long-term renewable energy contracts.

These claims are borne out by program-level research. 2021 interviews of 24 North American SEM program administrators showed that 80% believed that facilities participating in SEM achieve greater energy savings than similar non-participating facilities, with typical annual energy savings most often falling in the range of 2%–5% of a participant's baseline energy consumption.

== Non-energy benefits ==
Although often focused on energy management, SEM also supports other goals, including: reducing downtime and increasing productivity through improved maintenance practices, reducing CO_{2} and other air emissions through reduced on-site fuel combustion (through efficiency or through beneficial electrification), and improved employee productivity through increased employee morale.

== Core elements ==
Most companies take several years to develop all the elements of SEM. The core or minimum elements of SEM for achieving the goal and benefits just described include management commitment to long-term energy performance goals, energy planning and implementation, and system for measuring and reporting energy performance.

Research commissioned by the North American Strategic Energy Management Collaborative (NASEMC) in 2021 examined 24 of the roughly 42 SEM programs then operating in North America. Three-quarters of surveyed programs formally built these core elements on an established SEM framework, most commonly the Consortium for Energy Efficiency's Minimum Elements, with a smaller number instead relying on 50001 Ready or ISO 50001 itself.

== Current activities ==
Regional SEM collaboratives have met in the Northwestern and Northeastern United States for several years, with interest expressed in other regions for similar collaborative forums.

The first North American SEM Summit was conducted in Denver Colorado on August 15, 2017, with representatives from across the United States and Canada.

Program design research conducted in 2021 for the North American SEM Collaborative found that utility experience with SEM ranged from less than one year to 17 years, averaging 6.8 years. Programs served a mix of industrial, commercial, institutional, municipal, and water/wastewater customers, with industrial customers served by the largest share of programs (18 of 24).

The same study found that most programs (88%) project that energy savings from SEM persist after a customer's active engagement ends, typically applying an effective useful life (EUL) to reported savings. However, EUL values varied widely across programs, ranging from 1 to 13 years, and were seldom verified via primary field research. Where recent cost-effectiveness values were reported, all reporting programs met their applicable cost-effectiveness test — most commonly the total resource cost (TRC) test — though the specific ratios were not directly comparable across utilities given differing methodologies, inputs, and assumptions.

== Common services ==
While organizations can implement SEM on their own, many have found value in leveraging SEM specialists or SEM-based programs.

=== Private companies ===
Private companies provide SEM-based services to their customers as a dedicated consulting engagement. Other companies integrate SEM concepts into their more traditional energy engineering, energy planning, or energy project implementations.

=== Energy utilities ===
Energy utilities in the US and Canada often deploy dedicated SEM programs or deploy SEM components within other programs. These utilities deploy SEM for multiple reasons increased energy savings to support utility Demand Side Management (DSM) goals, measured in electrical, gas, or other energy savings, increased customer motivation to pursue energy saving opportunities (with less required utility outreach/marketing), reduced peak demand to address constraints in generation and/or transmission/distribution, and increased long-term customer satisfaction

The target customers for these programs are typically larger organizations, often manufacturers or larger building environments such as hospitals, water utilities, and universities.

Some utility SEM programs work with customers on an individual basis, and some provide training and coaching to groups of companies, often referred to as cohorts. The cohort approach tends to be more cost-effective for the utility, since at least some of the coach/trainer's time can serve several customers at once. In addition, the cohort can provide positive peer pressure for participants to take action and save more energy.

This cohort-based approach is common in practice: in the 2021 NASEMC survey of 24 North American SEM programs, more than half organized customers into learning cohorts (with a few offering both cohort and individual delivery), and about 80% offered customers some form of financial incentive to encourage participation, commonly performance-based payments, milestone payments, or both.

=== Government agencies ===
Government agencies around the world often deploy SEM programs to drive adoption of ISO 50001, to increase competitiveness of the businesses within their borders, and/or to address climate priorities.

== ISO 50001 ==
ISO 50001 codifies SEM by establishing universal requirements for management systems for energy (EnMSs). ISO 50001 is aligned to other management system standards for quality and environmental impact. It includes requirements for management participation, objectives, monitoring and measurement, and several other elements.

Verified performance data from ISO 50001-based programs illustrate the scale of savings SEM can deliver. An analysis of energy performance data from 83 U.S. manufacturing facilities certified under the Department of Energy's Superior Energy Performance (SEP 50001) program, which requires ISO 50001 certification, found that facilities achieved average annual energy performance improvements of about 4.1% in their first year of certification and sustained an average improvement rate of around 3.4% per year twelve years post-implementation. These improvements exceed both historical U.S. manufacturing efficiency gains and the improvement rates established by policymakers as necessary for industrial decarbonization. The same analysis found no meaningful difference in savings between facilities that retained the same energy management lead throughout the program and those that did not, suggesting that a properly implemented ISO 50001 energy management system becomes embedded in a facility's routine operations instead of depending on an individual energy champion.
