= S.E.M. Group =

- Company type: Private
- Industry: Civil engineering and construction
- Founded: 1976; 50 years ago in Salisbury, South Australia, Australia
- Founders: Harry and Janice Wauer
- Headquarters: South Australia, Australia
- Subsidiaries: SEM Civil, SEM Utilities, SEM Piling, SEM Traffic
- Website: semgroup.com.au

S.E.M. Group is a group of related civil engineering companies based in South Australia. It was established in 1976 by Harry and Janice Wauer as Salisbury Earthmovers Pty. Ltd.

S.E.M. Group is responsible for the interface of Bolivar Road and Port Wakefield Road as part of the Northern Connector project.
