= Colbún Lake =

Reservoir in the Maule Region in Chile

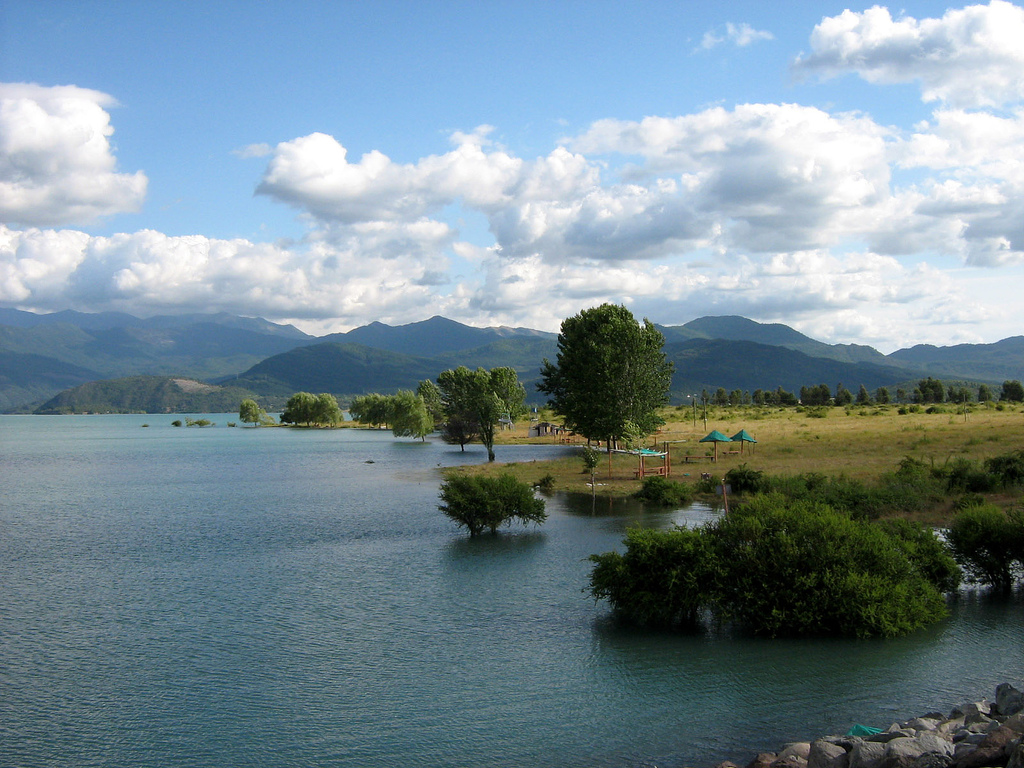

- Location within Chile
- Location: Maule Region
- Coordinates: 35.674°S 71.264°W
- Lake type: reservoir
- Primary inflows: Maule River
- Primary outflows: Maule River
- Basin countries: Chile
- Surface area: 57 km^{2} (22 sq mi)
- Water volume: 1,490,000 m^{3} (53,000,000 cu ft)

Colbún Lake (Spanish: Lago Colbún) is a reservoir in the Maule Region in Chile, straddling the provinces of Talca (comuna of San Clemente) and Linares (comuna de Colbún). Located 48 km southeast of the city of Talca, the regional capital and 35 km northeast of the city of Linares and with an area of 5,700 hectares and a capacity of 1,490,000 m³, it is the largest artificial reservoir in Chile. The lake lies at an altitude of 440 metres above sea level.

It was built between the years 1980 and 1985, in order to dam the waters of the Maule River for use in agricultural irrigation and hydroelectric power.

== Recreation ==
In the summer, the waters reach 23 °C. This fact and the favorable climatic conditions during the summer months render the lake a widely used spot for water sports. It also offers a variety of leisure activities, with lodging accommodations and tourism services available to visitors.
