= School of Ecclesiastic Music =

- Founder: Joseph Yazbeck
- Established: 1997
- Location: Lebanon
- Website: http://www.semlebanon.org

The School of Ecclesiastic Music (SEM) is a school of Byzantine music in Matn, Lebanon.

The school opened in 1997, as a project of the Antiochian Orthodox Archdiocese of Mount Lebanon. There were two campuses at Mkalles and Jal el Dib, which presently have more than 200 students. Now the school central classes are held in the Lebanese Academy of Fine Arts, where a full accreditation of the school curricula with the Hellenic Conservatory in Athens has been established.

The school introduced several new revisions of academic Byzantine music books and reference methodologies, replacing an archaic curriculum dating back to 1814.

The school also hosts an Orthodox liturgical choir: The Mount Lebanon Orthodox Choir with more than 100 professional chanters, and publishes recordings of liturgical music on CDs and cassettes.
