= Ingebjørg Dahl Sem =

Norwegian writer

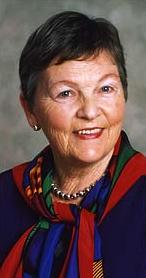
Ingebjørg Dahl Sem

Ingebjørg Dahl Sem (born 27 August 1936) is a Norwegian Christian writer.

She was born in Gjerpen Municipality as a daughter of farmers Karl Dahl (1911–96) and Sigrid Marie Simonsen (1913–1986). In July 1960 she married engineer Søren Sem.

She finished her secondary education in Skien in 1955, worked in Varden until 1961 and studied at the Norwegian Journalist Academy from 1958 to 1959. She later studied briefly at the University of Oslo, minoring in Nordic literature in 1971, and attended the Nansen Academy from 1984 to 1985.

In the 1960s she was a prolific writer for NRK radio's Barnetimen for de minste. She is mainly known for writing children's books and young adult fiction, with titles such as Tenk på Columbus! (1976), Angår dette meg? (1976), Fløyten og tårnet (1993), Bak neste sving (1995) and Historien om Barrabas (2002).
