= Las Marías Airport =

- IATA: none; ICAO: SCVL

Summary
- Airport type: Public
- Serves: Valdivia, Chile
- Elevation AMSL: 13 ft / 4 m
- Coordinates: 39°47′50″S 73°14′30″W

Map
- Location of Las Marías Airport in Chile

Runways
Direction	Length		Surface
Direction	m	ft	Surface
17L/35R	1,250	4,101	Concrete
17R/35L	1,000	3,281	Grass
- Sources: WAD GCM

Las Marías Airport (Spanish: Aeródromo Las Marías) (ICAO: SCVL) is an airport 2 kilometres (1.2 mi) north of Valdivia, a city in the Los Ríos Region of Chile. The airport operates in daylight hours year-round.

== See also ==
- Transport in Chile
- List of airports in Chile
