= HidroAysén =

Coordinates: 45.5667°S 72.0667°W

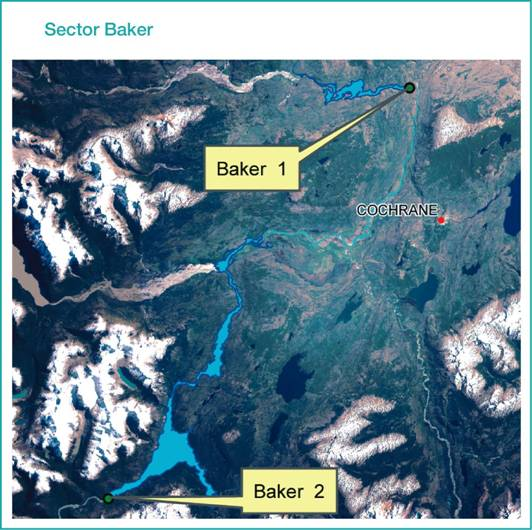
A map of the Baker dam sites

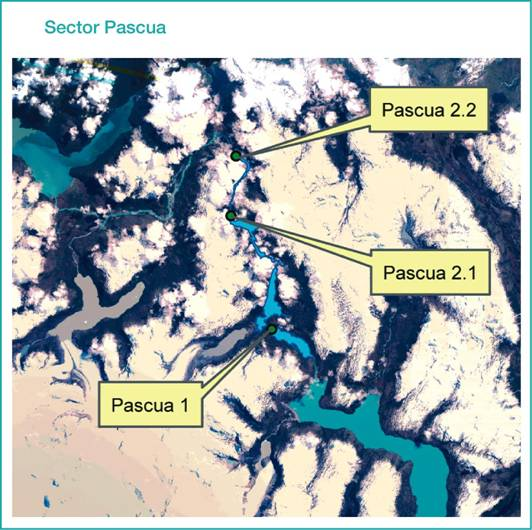
Map of the Pascua dam sites

HidroAysén (Pronounced: /ˈiːdroʊ aɪˈsɛn/ EE-droh EYE-sen Audio [Spanish and English]) was a controversial megaproject that aimed to build five hydroelectric power plants in Chile's Aysén Region, two on the Baker River and three on the Pascua River (with government subvention included to help relief costs). Planned for construction during the 2010s, the project was definitely cancelled by its contractors in November 2017.

The total expected installed power was 2,750 MW, generating an average 18,430 gigawatt-hours (66,300 TJ) per year, which corresponds to 21% of Central Interconnected System's (SIC) demand by 2020. A 3,000 high-voltage direct current line would have been built between Aysén and the capital Santiago to feed the SIC, including a submarine portion between Chaitén and Puerto Montt. The projected cost was estimated at 3.2 billion U.S. dollars (1.5 trillion Chilean pesos), and would have employed 5,000 workers from Chile and abroad, making it the largest energy project in the country's history.

HidroAysén is owned by a corporation which is a joint venture between Endesa (a subsidiary of Italian conglomerate ENEL), with a 51% stake and by Colbún S.A. which owns the other 49%.

== History ==
The dams were approved on May 9, 2011, under the government of President Sebastián Piñera. The decision was made by eleven counselors on a committee. Ten voted in favor, with one abstention. Twenty-seven days earlier the Foreign Investment Committee was already aware of the decision ahead of time. If completed these companies would own 80% of the Chilean energy market together establishing a duopoly. The project was placed on hold in early June 2012 due to protests. In June 2014, the project was rejected by the government of Chile, due to calls from environmentalists.

== Stakeholders ==
Endesa & Enel: The utility company Endesa was previously named Endesa Chile during the 70s and 80s when it had been a company of the state. Under Endesa Chile, water rights were in national hands because of national government control over the company. However, this changed after the privatization of Endesa in 1997 when it was bought by Spanish Investors through Endesa Spain, which was owned by the Italian utility company, Enel. This transition shifted 80% of Chile's non-consumptive water rights to Endesa Spain and Enel. Water rights were no longer nationalized like previously but were now owned by private Spanish investors. In 2006, The Chilean utility company Colbún and Endesa formed a partnership under the name HydroAysén. Endesa had owned fifty-one percent of the project, and Colbun had owned forty-nine percent.

HydroAysén: HydroAysén had campaigned and marketed the development of the dams as a project to meet the energy demands of the Northern population of Santiago, projecting 500 million dollars would be saved a year by the country if the construction was completed. However, a majority of this hydroelectricity would have been directed to the mining industry, specifically copper extraction. The company also marketed the dams as sustainable because they would replace several coal plants. The general manager of HydroAysén, Hernan Salazar, had characterized the project as sustainable in an interview with Patagonia Rising because it would benefit the entire country and for generations to come.

The creation of dams would have caused major flooding in the area of Patagonia, affecting the local population and would force the people to be displaced. HidroAysén had a two-stage plan for the displaced population of Patagonia. The first step would have been to inform the families who would have potentially been affected by the flooding. The company would have Informed the families of the project, the impact, and the project's programs. Supplemental to this, HidroAysén would then survey the population's socioeconomic situation to comprehend the full extent of how the project would affect the population. Next, authorities would require compensation to these affected families that HidroAysén would then pay. The second stage would have been to create a relocation agreement with the residents. Additionally, the power lines used for the transmission of the energy would have cut through 9 regions, 67 communities, 42 protected areas, and thousands of properties. The Senator of Aysén during this time, Antonio Horvath, was opposed to approving the project because of the lack of transparency from HydroAysén of where these power lines would cut through.

Local Residents: Residents who live in the countryside are self-sufficient and have traditional customs centralized in the Baker River and the ecosystems of Patagonia. Gauchos make up a large portion of the population of Patagonia and specialize in the production of timber, the breeding of animals such as sheep and cows, and the production of wool. In the village of Caleta Tortel, which is placed at the mouth of the Baker River, the production of timber and transportation of timber through the river is a big part of the economy for those living along the Baker River. In a survey done in the village where 86% of the residents 18 or older had participated, 76% answered that they were opposed to the dams. This opposition was expressed in January 2008 when a group of gauchos had ridden across the area of Patagonia to recruit local people to ride to the capital to protest the construction of the dams. At the capital, there were more than 300 people on their horses in protest.

Some residents were opposed to the idea of HidroAysén taking control of the water of the river and having to ask for permission for the usage of water. Others had feared that they would experience the same fate of the Mapuche/ Pehuenche people of the Bíobío River. Endesa promised the residents of the Bíobío River that they would be able to use the energy from the dams for free and that they would receive compensation. Instead, the residents were charged extremely high electricity bills, given no compensation, and were relocated to homes that had no direct source of water, causing significant difficulty to these farm-based villages.

However, not all residents of the Patagonia area were opposed to the construction of the dams. In the Cochrane area, some gaucho families were in favor of the dams in order to sell their land. In the town area of Cochrane, merchants and business owners had approved of the dam because of the influx of workers from HidroAysén. These workers would have increased the local economy. At the same time, these same residents also voiced their opposition to the change in the way of life the dams would have created.

== Protests ==
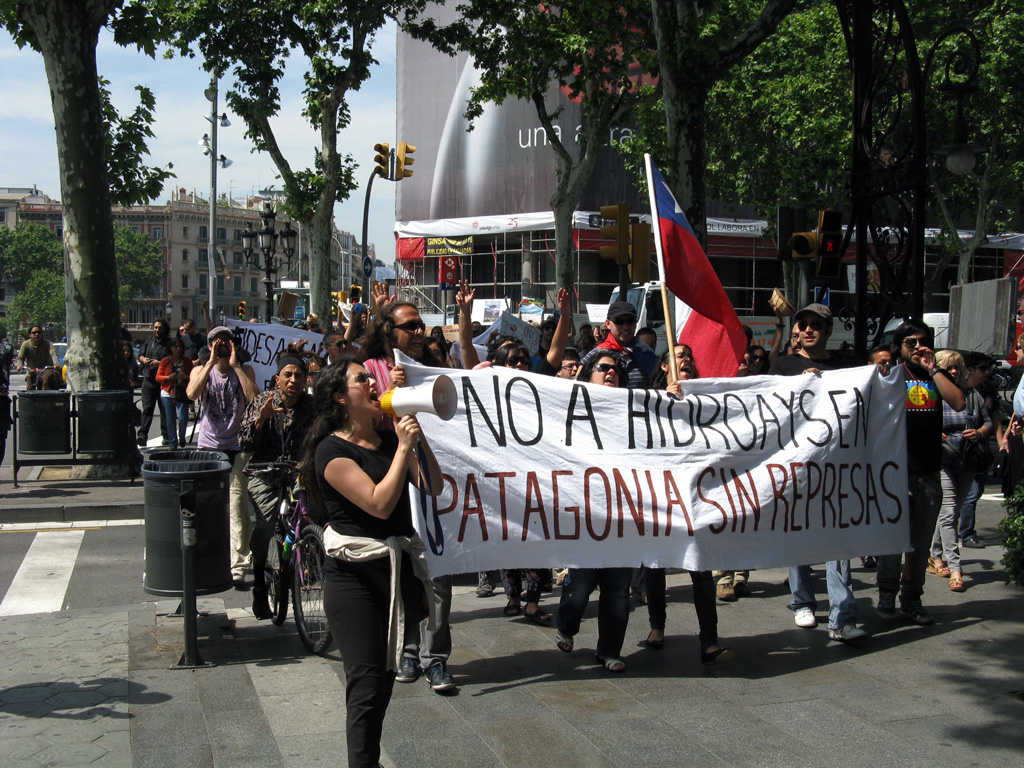
A protest against HidroAysen in Barcelona, Spain. The banner reads "No HydroAysén, dam free Patagonia" the opposition's slogan.

The lack of transparency in the decision-making process was widely criticized by the Chilean public; In fact it elicited nationwide street protests. The main detractors hoped to initiate legal actions against the project, and assured that the public demonstrations would be massive.

The planning process was harshly criticized by environmentalists and the local population of the Aysén del General Carlos Ibáñez del Campo Region. According to opinion polls in April 2011, the project was opposed by 61% of the population despite a massive public relations campaign in support of it. Later that same month upon government approval of the project opposition climbed to 74%.

The project was opposed by Greenpeace Chile with the slogan "¡Paren el circo, No a hidroaysén!" (Stop the circus, no Hidroaysén!) and "¡Salva la Patagonia!" (Save the Patagonia!). Local groups showed their opposition to the project with banners and bumper stickers reading, "Patagonia Sin Represas" ("Patagonia without dams").

HidroAysén launched a marketing campaign that was highlighted by fear-mongering that showed what life would be like without new energy in Chile produced by the project. This marketing attempt ultimately failed as those who were fervently against the dam in the first place were not swayed. Chileans around the country were too environmentally aware to be tricked by this marketing attempt and in the meantime would do nothing to stop protest and outrage against the project.

HidroAysén was met with strong opposition. Protests across the country did major damage as public property was destroyed totaling over $100,000. 28 police officers were injured during these encounters with some protests totaling over 4,000 participants. These protesters mostly consisted of environmentalists concerned with the country's future if HidroAysén was followed through. Polls were taken by various outlets which showed what the Chilean public thought of the energy project. In 2007, when the idea of HidroAysén was conceived around 38% of the Chilean population was against the project which is quite a small number when compared to the number of people that would be outraged by the project in the near future. Only four years later, in 2011, depending on what poll you looked at, anywhere from 60 to 74% of the population were against the construction of HidroAysén.

Protests against HydroAysén began to gain funding from environmental organizations outside of the country due to the increased press the topic was getting because of the ongoing disagreement between the majority of the government and the public in Chile. These organizations that helped fund the protests include the Natural Resource Defense Council as well as International Rivers. The Patagonia Defense Council would also play a large role in the conflict as they started a legal battle with the country that would coincide with the protests. Protests would continue to open new avenues of opposition against the project as celebrities from all walks of life in Chile would weigh in on HidroAysén, supporting those who had been against the project from the beginning. Another major win for the protesters came in the form of local government officials who spoke out against HidorAysén as they feared it would have detrimental effects on the areas that they governed.

=== Court case ===
Corporación Chile Ambiente (Chile Environmental Corporation) along with private citizens Elizabeth Schindele and Fran Yave Schindele filed a lawsuit against the megaproject based on water rights. They lost their case in the district court and later the supreme court rejected their appeal under the procedural rationale that such water rights cases cannot be appealed beyond the discretion of the lower court In June 2014, the project was rejected by the Chilean government due to its alleged environmental impact, however the decision may be appealed.

In 2011, the legality of the HidroAysén project was taken into account in the Court of Appeals in Puerto Montt. In a 2-1 decision, the HidroAysén project was upheld. The one judge who was willing to vote against HidroAysén agreed with many of the points that were made by the opposition, especially the regulatory points that were made. Marcelo Castillo who led the opposition of HidroAysén in court made seven major points against the construction of the dams. These included misleading mapping of the areas that would be directly affected by the dams. It was also found in the documentation that the dams would flood surrounding areas. One of the areas being the Laguna San Rafael National Park, a direct violation of Chilean national laws, as well as international agreements. The project is also a violation of the right of a pollution-free environment. All of the environmental impacts that would be caused through the addition of these dams were not highlighted in the documents presented to the Chilean Government. Finally, the town that was to host HidroAysén's workers would double in size, with a population spike that would not be sustainable with the resources that the region has to offer.

Later in 2014, the Chilean ministerial committee shot down HidroAysén after protests had garnered enough support from the Chilean public, celebrities, and government officials. Members of HidroAysén could take to court to appeal the decision even though they previously won their case in 2011.

== Proponents ==
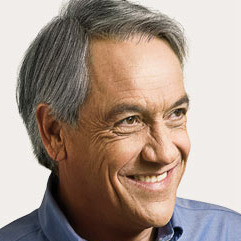
Former President Piñera, a major supporter of the project

The project was supported by the business community, conservative president Sebastián Piñera, and former socialist president Ricardo Lagos who stated that the project as necessary in public comments on the issue. A poll conducted in 2011 by La Tercera newspaper showed that the project was supported by 26% of the population, including 13% of self-identified leftists and 41% of right wingers. Furthermore, 19% of young people 18 to 34 years old and 34% of older people over age 55 approved of the project. However, 72% of respondents believed the project would become reality. This disparity in the number of people who approve of the project and the number of people who believe the project will come to fruition can be partly attributed to the healthy amount of distrust that exists among citizens towards government and scientific institutions. The reason for this skepticism is founded in hard evidence and experiences from Chileans across the country, many of whom believe the government is more concerned with the interests of the private sector than they are with the interests of the public. Under the current system that is in place the state is required to "buy advice from competing offers. This has meant that the state has to buy scientific data, information, and reports through different kinds of tender systems." This of course has led to government reports and statistics losing credibility in the eyes of the public. Secondly, environmental impact assessments or EIA's, require that before construction and operating licenses can be handed out by state agencies, developers must submit a scientific review of all the potential environmental impacts their industrial projects may cause. However, because of the poor conditions that many Chileans live in, scholars and activists have accused the state of overlooking how these projects can be detrimental to both the environment and the general public. For example, "By the late 2000s, two-thirds of Chileans lived in cities where air pollution regularly exceeds national air quality standards. Coal and petroleum coke power plants dotted the north of Chile and many coastal areas. A nongovernmental organization (NGO) labeled five industrial ports "sacrifice zones" because of their toxic pollution... Entire rivers now run dry, like the Copiapo, which twenty years ago still flowed through the Atacama Desert." Overall, these two policies; that the government must purchase scientific reports and must hand out construction and operating licenses for projects as they see fit, have contributed to the growing sentiment that public interests are not as important as the interests of the private sector, at least as far as the government is concerned.

== Environmental impact ==
The HidroAysén project planned to build five dams, two on the river Baker and three on the river Pascua. Both of the rivers lead to the Pacific Ocean. The project was to be constructed in the Patagonia region of Chile, an area known for its natural resources. This area is one of Chile's largest untouched areas of land and contains glaciers, ice-fields, mountains, fjords, lakes, and rivers that attract many eco-tourists every year. The dam project would have flooded around 5,900 hectares of natural reserves. The entire project would have impacted 6 national parks, 11 natural reserves, 26 conservation priority sites, 16 wetland areas, and 32 privately owned protected areas. A portion of the Baker dam would have been constructed in the Laguna San Rafael National Park and would have caused irreversible damage to the environment.

This project plan included a 1,200 mile transmission line, which would have been one of the longest transmission lines in the world. The first phase would have been built from the nearby town near Patagonia, Cochrane, to the city of Puerto Montt. The length of the first phase would have been 410 miles long. This line would have crossed seven of the fifteen regions in Chile, which includes private protected areas, priority conservation sites, indigenous communities, and national parks. This transmission line would have run around volcanoes and crossed through areas in Chile that are prone to earthquakes. Additionally, a service line that would span roughly 100 yards would have to be cut underneath the transmission line, which would cause negative impacts to the ecosystems and natural habitats of various species. 1,750 acres of forest would have been cut down during construction. The line would have also included about 1,500 to 1,700 towers of 164 feet in height. The plans were to build them behind mountains but this still would have caused damage to the environment and disrupted the lives of the locals. A portion of the line would have also been built underwater so to avoid going through the Chaiten volcano and Pumalin Park where it would eventually meet the main electric grid, the Central Interconnected System (CIS).

There were more potential impacts such as the spread of construction dust and run off, noise pollution, the disturbance of fish spawning areas, as well as wetlands. The project would have endangered the habitat of the Huemul, an endangered species of the deer family. Countless other species and ecosystems around would have also been endangered by the project. There were also potential longer-term impacts such as the loss of the eco-tourism and a loss of profit for the ranching economy, as well as the displacement of residents. Another possible impact was the risk of seismic activity of the region and the uncertainty of the consequences of climate change and the impact of this on the future of Patagonia. Changes in snow and rain patterns could be enough to cause damage to the dams themselves.

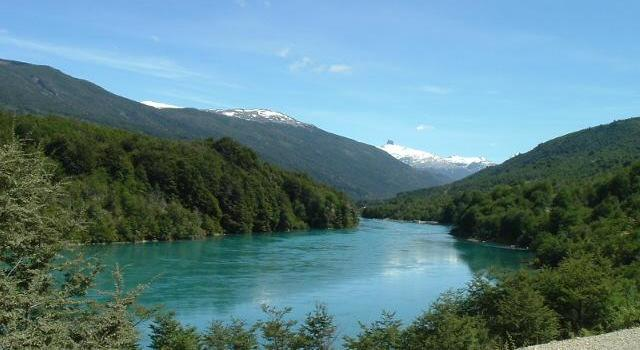
The Baker River.

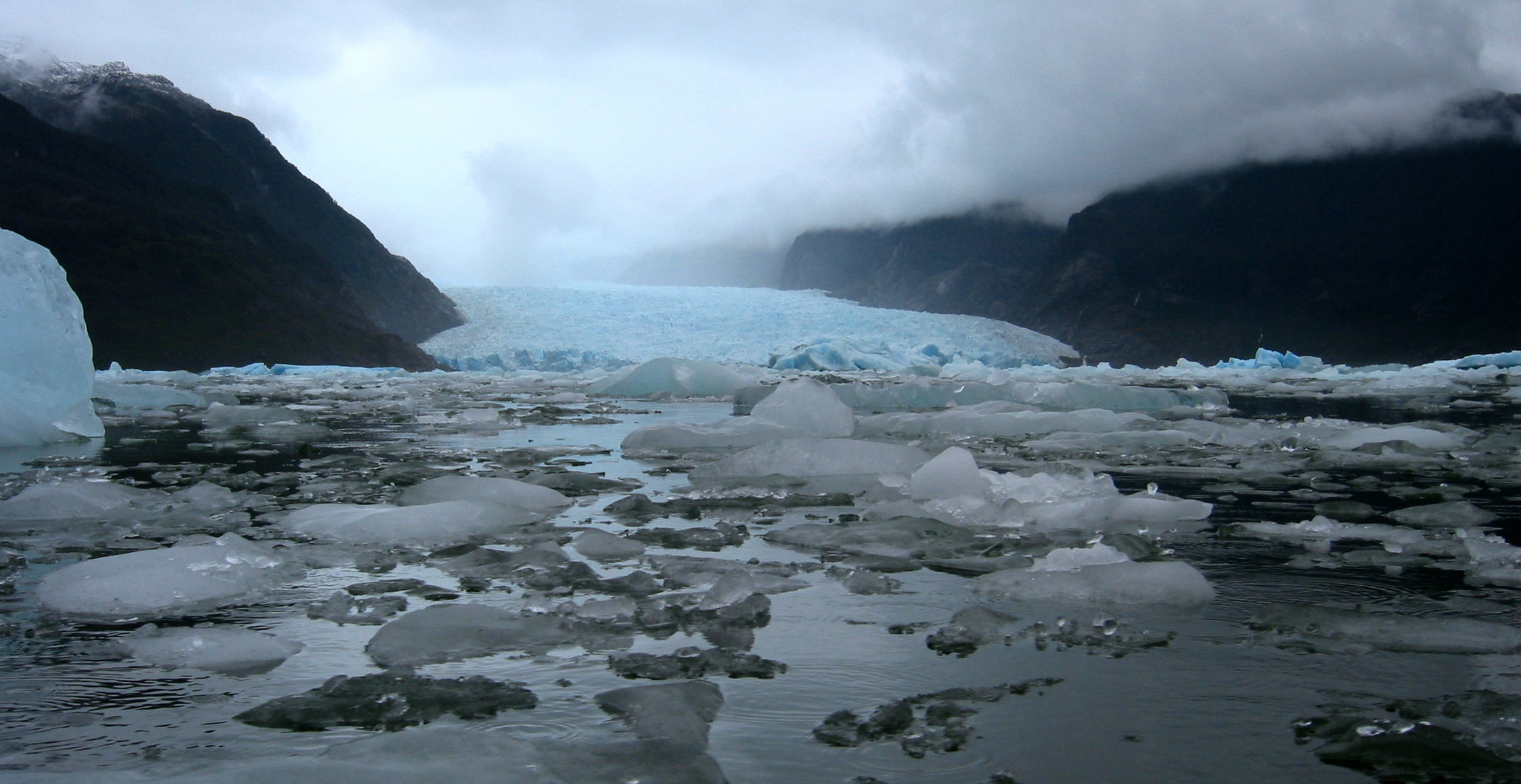
San Rafael Lagoon is Laguna San Rafael National Park's main attraction.

=== Environmental Impact Assessment ===
Chile's two largest energy companies, Endesa Chile and Colbún, first submitted the Environmental Impact Assessment (EIA) for the HidroAysén project in August 2008. All EIAs are evaluated by the Regional Environmental Commission. The document was over 10,000 pages long and was hugely criticized with thousands of criticisms and replies to the EIA reporting missing information or wrong data. Many organizations have complained and reported that the Environmental Impact Assessment done for HidroAysen left out many possible impacts associated with the construction of the dams. HidroAysén's EIA documents received over 2,600 critical comments from government agencies and over 10,000 public comments, most of which were never addressed. The documents received many calls for outright rejection. The Commission asked the companies to return with additional information. In the autumn of 2009, the two companies filed their revised EIA, which they called an addendum. This document was once again met with thousands of criticisms citing lack of essential information and relevant data. Once again, the Commission asked for more information. The companies in charge of the project decided to suspend environmental processing in order to respond to criticisms and concerns. The project's Environmental Qualification Resolution was overturned in 2014 by the Committee of Ministers due to concerns about the EIA. There were three reasons cited for this. Firstly, the plan failed to include a resolution for the relocation of the 39 families that live in the Aysén region. Secondly, there was a lack of evaluation of the impact on water resources. Thirdly, there were little to no studies done on the impact that the project would have on the land animals in the region.

Chile is a member of the Organization of Economic Cooperation and Development, which requires additional studies to be completed before a project can be approved and begin construction. The EIA that was submitted to the Commission did not include any alternative plans or the “no option” plan which is standard for other EIA plans in other countries. One of these alternatives includes proposing an option where other alternatives are used. A 2008 study found that Chile could use non-renewable energy along with efficient technology to produce the same amount of output that the dams would produce if they were constructed. The study found that these two alternatives would meet over 70% of the country's electricity needs without the same environmental impacts.

== Sustainable Development Goals ==
Collaborative action by local actors and environmental justice organizations had stopped the construction of the dams creating a positive impact that embodied many of the United Nations' Sustainable Development Goals. These include but not limited to:

Decent Work and Economic Growth (8): HidorAysén would have created economic growth by creating many jobs for the dam and the inner-town areas near the river. For example, in the town area of Cochrane, the merchants and businesses would have experienced economic growth from the influx of workers. However, these same merchants and businesses expressed that they would lose their traditional way of life if the dams were created. This way of life and loss of decent work would also be experienced by the gauchos and families living directly along the river. Gauchos and families living in the countryside had already had decent work and relied on economic systems provided by the Baker river's ecosystem. The creation of the dams would have stripped this away from them as seen before with the Mapuche/ Pehuenche people of the Bíobío River. Termination of the dams allowed the families living along the river to retain decent work and well-being, preserving the SDG of Decent work and Economic growth. Furthermore, the jobs created by the construction of the dams would have been temporary, and therefore not being a sustainable workforce, causing a crash on the inner-town merchants and businesses who would then experience a rapid decline once these workers left.

Sustainable Cities and Communities (11): Although HidorAysén would have created renewable energy and reduced Santiago's energy consumption from coal plants, the completion of the dams on Baker River would have flooded many villages that live across the river and causing these families to be displaced. These communities, such as Cochrane and Caleta Tortel, were already living sustainable lives that embodied this SDG. In the Cochrane area, candles had been traditionally used by the community for light sources. They had recently transitioned to using solar energy despite being in an area that received significantly less sunlight than Santiago. The termination of HidorAysén ultimately preserved the sustainable lifestyles of the communities living along the river.

Life below water (14): The construction of the dams would have severely impacted the ecosystems of the river by creating dust from construction, disturbing fish spawning areas, and hindering the flourishing of the wetlands and fauna of Patagonia. By terminating HidorAysén and the construction of the dams, the ecosystems that lived in the Baker and Pascua River could continue to flourish and be preserved for generations to come.

== Film ==
The 2010 documentary 180 Degrees South: Conquerors of the Useless tells of the journey of Jeff Johnson in 2007 from California to the Corcovado Volcano in the Chilean Patagonia. In the film, one can see local people disgruntled with the project of the dams on the Baker River.

A 2011 documentary, Patagonia Rising, by film maker Brian Lilla, features points of view from both sides of the issue.

== See also ==
- Alumysa, a suspended aluminium smelter project in Aysén Region
- Pedro Pierry
