= Colbún S.A. =

Utility company in Chile

- Company type: Sociedad Anónima
- Traded as: BCS: COLBUN
- Industry: Utility
- Founded: 1986
- Headquarters: Santiago, Chile
- Key people: Bernardo Matte Larraín, (CEO)
- Products: Electric power transmission
- Revenue: ▲US$ 1.4 billion (2012)
- Net income: ▲US$ 48.8 million (2012)
- Number of employees: 915
- Website: www.colbun.cl

Colbún is a utility company in Chile engaged in the electric power transmission segment. The company was created in 1982 and privatized in 1997. Originally it had only two hydroelectric plants, Machicura and Colbún from where it gets its name. Today Colbún S.A. generates a total of 2514 MW, of which 1274 comes from hydropower and 1236 from fossil fuels plants. Colbún S.A. supplies the Sistema Interconectado Central power grid that spans Zona Central and Zona Sur but is currently developing a controversial joint venture project with ENDESA, called HidroAysén, to create five hydroelectrical power plants in Aisén Region.

In 1997, CORFO sold its 37.5% share, and in March 1997 was fully privatized. The main shareholders are Minera Valparaiso SA (Group Matte) (34.97%) and Electropacífico Investment Ltd. (28.60%).

== See also ==
- Central San Pedro
- HidroAysén
- Ralco Hydroelectric Plant
- Endesa (Chile)
