= Sistema Eléctrico de Magallanes =

The Sistema Eléctrico de Magallanes (Spanish for Electric System of Magallanes) or SEM is an alternating current power grid serving the Magallanes and Antartica Chilena Region of Chile. All of the SEM's power generation is produced by combustion of fossil fuels in thermal power plants, some of the fuel comes from the oilfields in the Strait of Magellan. SEM's power generation stands currently for about 0.8% of the national generation. The communes of Antártica and Cabo de Hornos, including Puerto Williams are not connected to the system.

As of November, 2010, it had a total installed capacity of 101 MW (gross)
