= Sistema Interconectado Central =

The Sistema Interconectado Central (Spanish for Central Interconnected System) or SIC was the main alternating current power grid in Chile spanning all of Chile from Atacama Region in the north to Los Lagos Region in the south. SIC transmitted 68.5% of the national generation and served 93% of Chile's population.

As of December, 2011, it had a total installed capacity of 12,904 MW (gross)

Since 2017, the grid was joined and synchronized with the Northern Synchronized Grid (Sistema Interconectado del Norte Grande Spanish) and the total installed capacity of the new grid, called Sistema Eléctrico Nacional (SEN) (Spanish for National Electrical System), was 31,709 MW as of April 2022.
