= Ricardo Carrasco =

Chilean photographer (born 1965)

Ricardo Carrasco Stuparich
- Occupation: Photographer

Ricardo Carrasco Stuparich is a Chilean photographer, author and photography teacher, best known for nature and travel photography of South America.

== Early life ==
Born in Santiago, Chile from a family of artists and musicians, Ricardo Aleide Carrasco Stuparich started in nature photography at an early age at his family farm in Santa Cruz de Cuca near the town of Quinchamalí. Using a Soviet-Russian 35 mm Zenitcamera and handmade extension tubes he then experimented in macro photography. This led to his first published article by a major publication, Geomundo, about the praying mantis, in his early teens.

In 1983 he studied photography and video production at the Arcis Institute in Santiago.

== Career ==
Over the years, Carrasco traveled extensively through Chile, compiling a stock photo collection. His interest in mountain climbing and kayaking and constant travels led to numerous articles and a permanent engagement with the Sunday magazine of Chile's El Mercurio newspaper, from 1986 to 1990.

In 1991 Carrasco moved to the city of Valdivia, in Southern Chile. He published a book about the Carlos Anwandter Nature Sanctuary (Spanish: Santuario de la naturaleza Carlos Anwandter), a protected wetland in Cruces River about 15 km north of Valdivia.

By 2000, he moved to the city of Chillan and started collaborating extensively with Americas Magazine, a bimonthly publication by the Organization of American States (OAS), with the Spanish language edition of National Geographic Magazine, The New York Times, and Traveler Magazine (UKLA), among others.

In 2004 along with scientists from the Austral University of Chile in Valdivia, Carrasco was an active advocate for the protection of the Carlos Anwandter Nature Sanctuary from pollution caused by the Valdivia Pulp Mill and its effect on bird species including black-necked swans.

In 2006 Carrasco started collaborating with articles and photographs for the travel magazine of the Chilean newspapers El Mercurio and La Tercera. These assignments have taken him to cover archaeological sites in Peru and Mexico as well as travel destinations in Argentina, Bolivia, Brazil, Chile, Canada, China, and Colombia.

Carrasco operates RCSPHOTO, an extensive photo stock collection of South America in 35 mm transparencies. He also shoots color digital photography and produces panoramic photographs with medium format Linhof Technorama cameras up to 7x16".

He had an exhibit in Beijing and Tianjin as part of the cultural exchange organized by the Embassy of Chile in China. He made extensive panoramic photography coverage of Easter Island. He has made constant travels across South America, North America and Asia on assignment for Chilean and international publications. He was editor and collaborator for the Chilean photography magazine, CAPTION Magazine.
