= 2020–2026 H5N1 outbreak =

Ongoing global outbreak of avian flu H5N1

Outbreaks of avian influenza subtype H5N1 have been occurring since 2020, with cases reported from every continent. Some species of wild aquatic birds act as natural asymptomatic carriers of influenza A viruses, which can infect poultry, other bird species, mammals (including humans) if they come into close contact with infected feces or contaminated material, or by eating infected birds. The virus strain involved in the global outbreak is classified as H5N1 clade 2.3.4.4b, which has adapted to cause significant outbreaks in a broader range of species, mammals included.

H5N6 and H5N8 viruses with the H5-2.3.4.4b hemagglutinin (HA) gene became the dominant avian influenza viruses globally in 2018–2020 (see 2020–2023 H5N8 outbreak). In 2020, reassortment (genetic "swapping") between these H5-2.3.4.4b viruses and other strains of avian influenza led to the emergence of a H5N1 strain with a H5-2.3.4.4b gene. The virus then spread across Europe, first detected there in the autumn of 2020, before spreading to Africa and Asia. It continues to swap genes with local flu viruses as it crosses the globe.

As of June 2026, H5N1 avian influenza is

- widespread in wild bird populations, in all continents
- frequently spilling over into poultry flocks, necessitating mass slaughter
- established in US dairy cows
- causing sporadic human cases, generally in people exposed to infected birds or cattle
- known to have infected at least 43 species of mammal

Human trials of a vaccine commenced in April 2026.

== Vaccine ==
H5-2.3.4.4b can be prevented by vaccination in chickens. In China, the H5-Re14 (2.3.4.4b) strain used in updated vaccines since 2022 is a reasonably good match for the new virus.

In May 2024, Penn Medicine announced it had created a human avian flu vaccine on the same platform as its COVID-19 vaccine. The experimental mRNA vaccine utilizing lipid nanoparticles (LNPs) had worked to protect lab animals from severe illness and death for at least one year prior to the announcement. It was tested in mice and ferrets, and all vaccinated animals were found to survive H5N1 infections.

A 2025 study describes a recombinant subunit vaccine containing the N1 antigen from A/Michigan/45/2015 (H1N1), a virus used in seasonal flu vaccines. It provided partial protection for the A/bald eagle/Florida/W22-134-OP/2022 (H5-2.3.4.4b H5N1) virus in mice.

== Timeline ==
Countries that have reported deaths of poultry or wild birds linked to highly pathogenic H5N1 infection as of March 2023 Countries that have reported human cases of highly pathogenic H5N1 infection

=== 2020 and prior ===
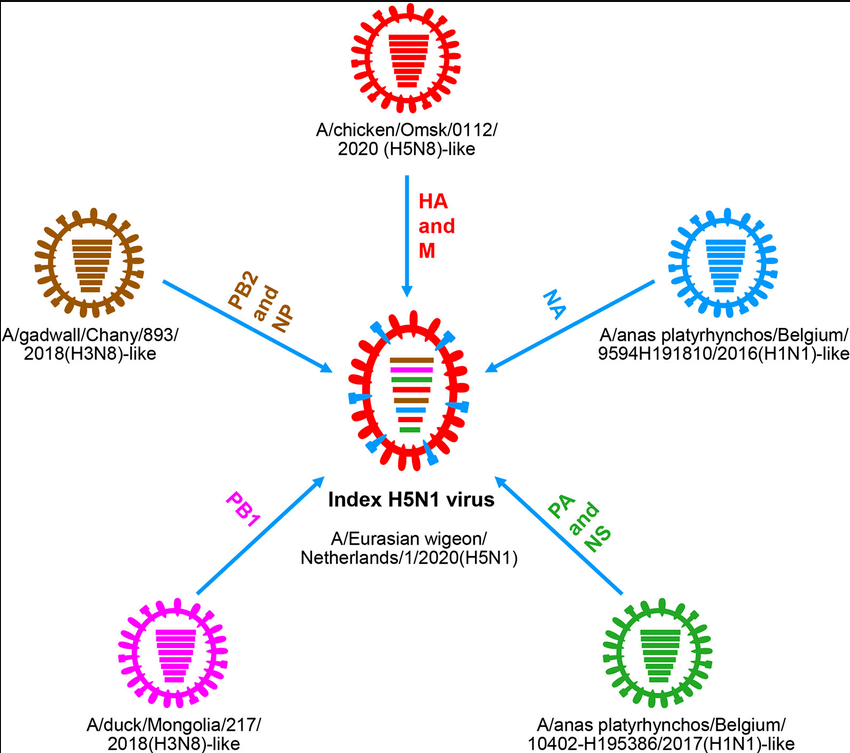
Formation of the index H5N1 virus bearing the 2.3.4.4b HA gene in 2020. The eight bars represent the eight gene segments (from top to bottom: PB2, PB1, PA, HA, NP, NA, M, and NS), and the colour of the bar indicates the closest donor strain of the gene segment.

Genetic reassortment of several influenza A strains culminates in the emergence of a highly pathogenic H5N1 subtype bearing the clade 2.3.4.4b hemagglutinin (HA) gene.

=== 2021 ===
In May 2021, H5N1 was detected in wild red foxes in the Netherlands. It was later detected in December in Estonia in wild foxes. About 8,000 cranes died in Israel.

Over 1,700 great cormorants died from H5N1 in the Baltic Sea in the summers of 2021 and 2022.

=== 2022 ===
In January 2022, an infection in an eighty-year-old man who raises ducks in England was reported. Also in January, infections were reported from the United States in wild birds. In February, infections were reported from commercial poultry centres in the U.S., and Peru reported infections in sea lions. The virus continued to spread further, infecting additional species of mammals. In October, a mink farm in northwest Spain was affected. In December, a HPAI H5N1 subtype of clade 2.3.4.4b was found in a captive Asian black bear and in wild and captive birds in a wildlife park in France.

A human case of H5N1 was reported in the U.S. in April, "though this detection may have been the result of contamination of the nasal passages with the virus rather than actual infection." In September, Spain reported a human case; this was followed by a second case in November, in a person who worked at the same poultry farm as the first. Both were asymptomatic. In November, China reported a human case, infected due to contact with poultry. The case died from their infection.

A mass Caspian seal die-off in December 2022, with 700 infected seals found dead along the Caspian Sea coastline of Russia's Dagestan republic, worried researchers regarding the possibility that wild mammal-to-mammal spread had begun.

=== 2023 ===
==== Antarctic islands ====
H5N1 was first detected on the islands of the Antarctic region in October 2023, via a brown skua on Bird Island, near South Georgia. Within several months, hundreds of elephant seals were found dead, as well as fur seals, kelp gulls, 77 brown skuas, 38 gentoo penguins, and 58 snowy albatrosses.

==== Arctic ====
In December 2023, conservation officials confirmed that a polar bear had died of H5N1 near Alaska's northernmost city, Utqiagvik.

==== Brazil ====
On 22 May 2023, Brazil declared a 180-day "animal health emergency" in response to eight cases of H5N1 found in wild birds. Although Brazil's major poultry-producing regions are in the country's south and the infections were found in Espirito Santo state and Rio de Janeiro state, Brazil, as the world's largest exporter of chicken meat, created an emergency operations center to plan for and mitigate potential further spread of H5N1.

==== Canada ====
On 1 April 2023, a domestic dog in Oshawa tested positive for H5N1.

==== Cambodia ====
In February 2023, Cambodia reported the death of a girl due to H5N1 infection after developing symptoms on 16 February. The girl's father also tested positive for the virus. The World Health Organization (WHO) described the situation as "worrying" and urged "heightened vigilance". Further sequencing determined that at least one of the two cases was from an older H5N1 clade, 2.3.2.1c, which had circulated as a common H5N1 strain in Cambodia for many years, rather than the more recent clade 2.3.4.4b, which had caused mass poultry deaths since 2020. This older clade had jumped to humans in the past yet hadn't previously resulted in any known human-to-human transmission.

On 1 March 2023, as Taiwan raised its travel alert for Cambodia, the WHO and the U.S. Center for Disease and Control and Prevention (CDC), in concert with Cambodian authorities, determined that both of the individuals had been infected through direct contact with poultry.

==== China ====
On 4 February 2023, a 53-year-old patient was admitted to hospital with severe pneumonia in Jiangsu. Genetic sequencing revealed that the H5N1 avian influenza infected in this case belonged to clade 2.3.4.4b. She had a co-infection of H5N1 and SARS-CoV-2.

==== Hungary ====
10,000 cranes died of bird flu in Hungary.

==== South America ====
In late February 2023, Argentina confirmed a case of H5N1 in industrial poultry, in the Rio Negro province. Avian product exports were suspended as a result.

In March 2023, H5N1 was detected in black-necked swan populations in Carlos Anwandter Nature Sanctuary, Chile and Uruguay. In Uruguay, the death of ten swans found in the locality of Estación Tapia was attributed to flu. Previously in Uruguay, ten hens had died because of the flu in El Monarca, Montevideo.

In late March 2023, Chile detected H5N1 in a 53-year-old man who had severe symptoms. The patient survived but had to stay on a ventilator. The virus was determined to be in the 2.3.4.4b lineage.

In September 2023, Uruguay reported upwards of 400 seals and sea lions found dead of H5N1 on the nation's Atlantic coastline and along the River Plate. Between January and October 2023, at least 24,000 South American sea lions died from H5N1 flu, with the outbreak starting on the Pacific coast of Peru, moving down the coast to Chile and then up the Atlantic coast of Argentina.

An outbreak of H5N1 killed 70% of Southern elephant seal pups born in the 2023 breeding season. In surveyed areas of Península Valdés, Argentina, seal mortality rates reached 96%. In February 2024, it was estimated that the outbreak of H5N1 in South America had killed at least 600,000 wild birds and 50,000 mammals since 2022.

=== 2024 ===
==== Antarctica ====
H5N1 was detected in dead birds on the Antarctic mainland for the first time in February 2024. In February, scientists found H5N1 in 12 Antarctic skua seabirds carcasses on Beak Island. Additional cases have also been found at Hope Bay and on the Devil and Paulet islands. In March, scientists detected the virus in nine Adélie penguins and one Antarctic cormorant.

==== Australia ====
In May 2024, H5N1 was detected for the first time in Australia after a human child who had returned to the country from India tested positive. The child was infected with the South Asian 2.3.2.1a clade of H5N1 and had severe symptoms but recovered.

H5 bird flu was detected in Australia for the first time in June 2026, after a migratory seabird in Esperance, Western Australia, tested positive for the deadly H5 strain. Authorities said there was at that time evidence of spread to poultry or mass wildlife deaths, with enhanced surveillance and biosecurity measures in place. However, the virus had spread quickly by the end of August, with over 350 confirmed events of bird flu, which included a number of mass mortality events, with around 20 species affected, including not only many species of coastal and urban birds, but also three species of mammal: a long-nosed fur seal; a common dolphin, and a fox.

As of 15 September 2026 there were 521 confirmed events (meaning many more individual cases), with the majority (286) found in South Australia. The most affected species is the greater crested tern. On 13 September 2026, the first confirmed case of an H5 bird flu in an endangered Australian sea lion, found at Seal Bay on Kangaroo Island, South Australia, was reported.

==== India ====
On 18 April 2024, H5N1 was detected in ducks in Alappuzha district, Kerala. The District Collector decided to initiate the process of culling domestic birds within a 1 kilometre (0.62 mi) radius from the center of the outbreak. By 9 May 2024, district officials had culled 60,232 birds in Alappuzha. Farmers were compensated ₹100 per ducklings and chicks, ₹200 per older bird, and ₹5 per egg destroyed.

==== Canada ====
In November 2024, a teenager from the Vancouver region became infected with H5N1 avian influenza from an unknown source. Initially presenting with ocular symptoms, the patient later developed a serious pneumonia, indicating a novel progression of disease. The virus belongs to the 2.3.4.4b clade which has been circulating among poultry in British Columbia, related to virus carried by wild birds migrating along the Pacific flyway.

==== China ====
On 18 May, Chinese authorities confirmed 275 cases of bird flu in dead Pallas's gulls and other wild birds in two counties in Qinghai province.

==== Southeast Asia ====
A cluster of five human infections with H5N1 occurred in Cambodia in late January and early February; one patient died. All patients had recent contact with sick poultry. Genetic sequencing revealed that they were infected by clade 2.3.2.1c, a different lineage from the 2.3.4.4b clade that is causing global outbreaks. A person in Vietnam died of H5N1 infection around the same time, clade unknown.

In April 2024, the FAO reported that recent reassortment in the Greater Mekong Subregion has produced viruses that carry internal genes from the 2.3.4.4b lineage but the H5 gene from the older 2.3.2.1c lineage. These viruses have been implicated in human cases.

On 5 April, the Philippines reported a H5N1 outbreak on a poultry farm in Leyte, which killed 4,475 birds. Earlier in the year, the Philippines Department of Agriculture temporarily banned poultry exports from several countries including Japan, Belgium, and France.

On 6 July, it was reported that two Cambodian children became sick with H5N1 infections after handling dead chickens.

==== United States ====
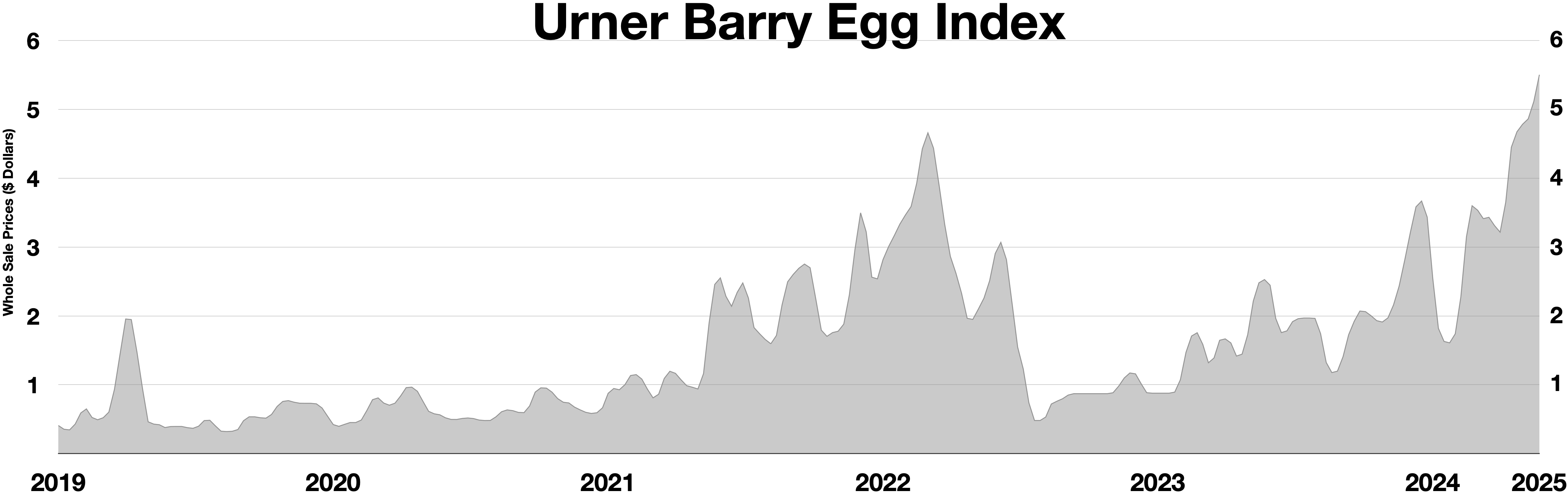
Urner Barry egg price index

The US CDC continues to report "widespread" occurrence in wild birds, "sporadic outbreaks" in poultry flocks, and "sporadic infections" in mammals as of March 2024. As of 8 March 2024, the United States Department of Agriculture's (USDA) Animal and Plant Health Inspection Service (APHIS) had recorded around 20 mammal species confirmed as being able to be infected by H5N1. Also in March 2024, H5N1 was confirmed to have infected farmed goats and cows in the USA.

On 2 April, a dairy worker in Texas became infected, and strong indications of cow-to-cow spread were evident as cow herds in five different states became ill. A few days later, on 4 April, H5N1 was confirmed to have spread to several additional dairy herds in six US states, including Texas, along with Idaho, Kansas, New Mexico, Ohio and Michigan. Scientists deemed these to be either cow-to-cow transmission or spillover from wild birds. On 11 April, H5N1 was found in dairy cattle herds in North Carolina and South Dakota. On 10 April, researchers found several cases of HPAI H5N1 in animals in New York City, including three Canada geese, a red-tailed hawk, a peregrine falcon, and a chicken. Scientists have also found cases of H5N1 of clade 2.3.4.4b in common bottlenose dolphins from Florida.

On 26 April, the FDA reported the virus had spread to cow herds in nine states, including Colorado, with one in five U.S. commercial milk samples testing positive for traces of bird flu. H5N1 was found to be present at high levels in the mammary glands of affected cows, and cats that consumed unpasteurized milk from symptomatic cows displayed a high mortality rate from a severe systemic influenza infection. More than half the cats on one farm died after drinking raw milk from infected cows. On 10 May, the Biden administration announced it would provide nearly $200 million to help contain the current outbreak. The US Department of Agriculture pledged $98 million at a split of $28,000 per dairy farm, while the Department of Health and Human Services (HHS) will provide $101 million split between the FDA and the US Centers for Disease Control and Prevention (CDC).

On 16 May, the US Department of Agriculture's National Veterinary Services Laboratories confirmed positive tests for the virus in alpacas on a farm in Idaho, who had to be culled. On 22 May, a farm worker in Michigan was infected with the bird flu due to their regular exposure to infected dairy cows. The person had mild symptoms and recovered. It was shown that H5N1 can persist on milking equipment, which provides a probable transmission route for cow-to-cow and cow-to-human spread. On 30 May, it was announced that a second Michigan farm worker from a different dairy farm had been diagnosed with bird flu after exhibiting respiratory symptoms.

In early June, a flock of 4.2 million egg-laying chickens and a flock of 103,000 turkeys were infected in Iowa. It was also that reported that HPAI H5N1 had spread to dairy herds in Iowa, as well as Minnesota, Wyoming and Oklahoma, increasing the number of states with infected dairy herds to thirteen. As of 6 June, infected dairy cows in five states, South Dakota, Michigan, Texas, Ohio, and Colorado, had died from the H5N1 avian flu, with an estimated mortality rate of up to 10%. Beginning in late June, the USDA launched voluntary pilot programs to test bulk milk tanks on dairy farms in four states: Kansas, Nebraska, New Mexico, and Texas. Farmers who volunteered for the program were allowed to move their herds across state lines without additional testing if their bulk milk tanks were found negative for H5N1 for three consecutive weeks.

By the end of July, it had become apparent that Weld County, Colorado had become the centre of the unprecedented multi-species outbreak of H5N1 in the United States. Outbreaks in multiple large poultry facilities and intensive dairy farms led to ten human farm-worker cases being reported in and around the county. Research conducted in this region showed H5N1 as having the ability to replicate copiously in bovine mammary glands, leading to multi-directional intra- and inter-species transmission between cows, humans, cats, birds and a raccoon. It was also shown that asymptomatic cows could spread the disease. In response, the Colorado authorities brought in mandatory milk tank testing (excluding raw milk producers) and an on-line data tracker for human cases in the state. On 31 July, a study found 2 farmworkers who had not been tested for bird flu had antibodies against it.

On 9 August, the Colorado Department of Public Health reported bird flu in domestic cats, including indoor-only cats. In late August, H5N1 had spread to dairy cow herds in California. On 22 August, the first person in the U.S. who didn't work with poultry or dairy cows was hospitalized with the H5 influenza virus. This person is also the 15th human case of H5 reported in the U.S. since 2022.

In September 2024, the CDC confirms that two dairy workers in California have contracted bird flu, marking the 15th and 16th human cases in this year's ongoing outbreak, which has impacted dairy cows nationwide. The cases occurred in California's Central Valley, where over 50 herds have been affected since August. Both workers, who had contact with infected cattle, developed mild symptoms, including conjunctivitis. The CDC confirmed the positive test results on Thursday, while state health officials noted that the workers were employed at separate farms, indicating the infections likely resulted from animal exposure rather than human transmission. In October 2024, a third farmworker in California has tested positive for bird flu, according to the state's health department, marking the 17th potential human case of H5N1 in the U.S. since March. Like the previous two cases, this farmworker had contact with infected dairy cattle, and investigators believe the transmission occurred from animals rather than between people.

By late October, California had reported that 133 of its 1,100 dairy herds were infected, with a bovine mortality rate of around 15%. The business interests of the heavily corporatised dairy and livestock industries being prioritised over public health and animal welfare was stipulated as the main cause of the failure to control the novel outbreak. H5N1 was also detected in a pig in Oregon, the first ever reported case in the USA. Meanwhile, by late November, human cases of H5N1 in the USA increased to over fifty for the year with infections being reported in seven states. On 7 November, the CDC reported asymptomatic bird flu infection in 4 workers at dairy farms. The workers didn't recall ever being sick but had antibodies showing that they had been infected with bird flu. On 22 November, the CDC confirmed the first case of bird flu in a U.S. child, being the 55th case of bird flu in humans in the U.S. The child also tested positive for other common respiratory viruses. New Scientist said that an H5N1 virus infecting a human could acquire all the abilities it needs to become a pandemic virus by swapping genes with a human virus infecting the same individual.

In the last quarter of 2024, 20 million chickens were put down, causing an egg shortage in the following months.

On 6 December, the USDA announced a new mandate to test the national milk supply for bird flu as part of efforts to combat the virus's spread among dairy herds. Beginning 16 December, entities handling raw milk, such as dairy processors, would collect and share samples with agricultural officials. The initiative initially targeted six states: California, Colorado, Michigan, Mississippi, Pennsylvania, and Oregon. Since March, over 700 dairy herds, predominantly in California, had already been affected, alongside 57 human cases of mild symptoms reported across the country. The USDA emphasized the program's role in swiftly identifying and controlling outbreaks, ensuring the safety of livestock and public health. The agency further noted that the mandate complemented rather than replaced an earlier April mandate requiring bird flu testing for milk-producing cows before interstate movement. On 18 December, Centers for Disease Control and Prevention confirmed that a patient in Louisiana was hospitalized with a severe case of H5N1, as well as another case in Wisconsin. The Louisiana patient later died, becoming the first human fatality to H5N1 to occur in the USA. California governor Gavin Newsom announced a state of emergency due to the rising cases of the bird flu. The following day, a report of a human case with the bird flu was confirmed in Texas.

=== 2025 ===
==== Cambodia ====
In January, a 28-year-old man from Kampong Cham province died from H5N1 avian flu infection after possibly consuming symptomatic chickens. In February, a second death from H5N1 occurred in a toddler who had played and slept near sick chickens. In March, a 3-year-old boy died from H5N1 after being exposed to and consuming infected chickens.

==== Germany ====
Estimated 2,000 cranes died of bird flu. The Friedrich Loeffler Institute (FLI) registered 15 outbreaks in poultry farms. The German government culled over 500,000 birds in October as the FLI reported over 103 outbreaks, including 30 among poultry battery farms, across the country.

==== India ====
India reported a fatal human case of H5N1 in April.

==== Mexico ====
Mexico reported its first human case of H5N1 infection in April. The patient, a 3 year old girl, died soon after.

==== United Kingdom ====
The UK reported a human case of H5N1 avian influenza in late January which was detected in a poultry farm worker. An infected sheep located on an outbreak affected poultry farm was reported in March. Similar to H5N1 in cows, the sheep displayed mastitis and produced milk containing the virus.

In November, the progress of the outbreak in the UK was described as equal to that of 2022-2023, the previous season with largest outbreak; 50 cases had occurred so far on farms across the UK this season.

==== United States ====
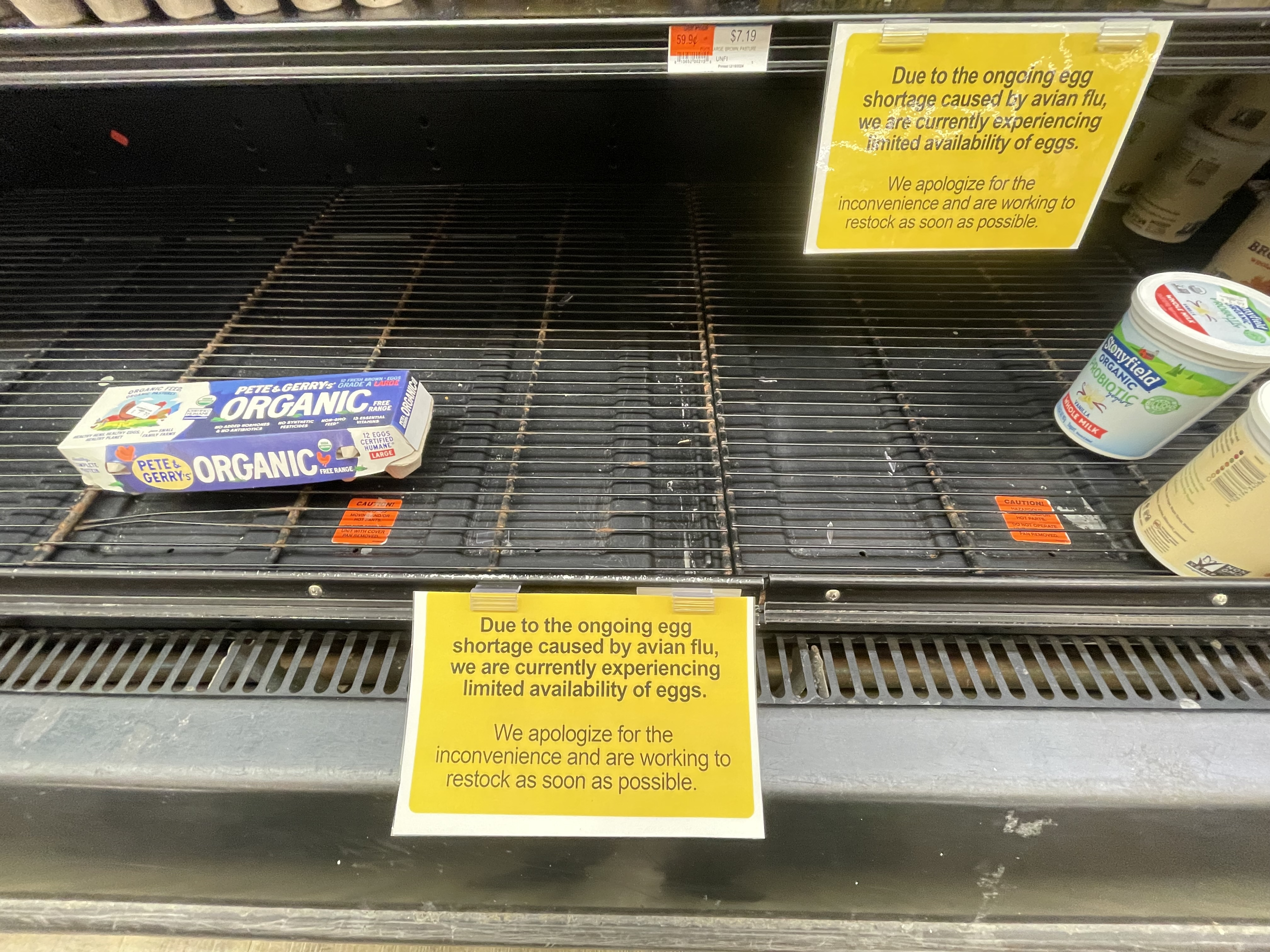
Egg shortage at a local supermarket in Brooklyn, New York in February 2025

On 6 January, the Louisiana Department of Health reported the first confirmed bird flu-related death in a human in the United States. The victim, an unidentified Louisiana man, had previously been reported sick with the virus in December after being exposed to a combination of infected backyard chickens and wild birds. The man was reported to be over 65 and had underlying health conditions. On 12 February, Ohio confirmed their first case, being an adult male, which was then followed by Wyoming Department of Health reporting the first case of bird flu in their state two days later on 14 February, which was a woman.

=== 2026 ===
==== Australia ====
In June 2026, the first confirmed cases of the virus were reported in Western Australia and South Australia, with the first two cases near Esperance. Australia was the last continent to have a confirmed case of the virus.

By 11 August 2026, Australia had confirmed 230 cases of the H5N1 strain. That same day, the Australian Government announced it would spend A$2 million in rolling out about 1,500 vials to combat the H5N1 virus.

On the 13th of August, Tasmania reported its first case of bird flu in a brown skua, being the last state in Australia to report the virus.

On 20 August 2026, it was reported that mass deaths of crested terns had been discovered on three small islands in South Australia, The Pages and Troubridge Island, totalling around 1,000 dead birds. It was "presumed" that they had died of H5N1. At this point, there had been 177 confirmed cases in the state.

The federal government is keeping a tally of confirmed events (not individual birds) on a dedicated website. As of 22 August, there had been 290 positively-identified events, with over 24,510 reports being processed by a special hotline. On 23 August, the first confirmed case detected in a mammal was found, in a long-nosed fur seal, found at Beachport, South Australia, leading to fears that the virus may spread to Australian sea lions, which have a breeding colony on The Pages.

==== New Zealand ====
On 15 July 2026, the first confirmed case of the virus was reported in a brown skua found at Petone Beach in Wellington. In response, the Department of Conservation announced that it would begin vaccinating 300 "vulnerable" native birds.

On 17 July, a second case was confirmed in a native swamp harrier in Wairarapa.

== See also ==
- Global spread of H5N1
- List of mammals that can get H5N1
- Avian influenza
- Yarding – Provision of a fenced yard in poultry keeping
