= Valdivia Pulp Mill =

Coordinates: 39.5657°S 72.8999°W

The Valdivia Pulp Mill or Planta Valdivia is a pulp mill and biomass-fueled electrical generating station in San José de la Mariquina, Los Ríos Region, Chile. Although the main activity is wood pulp production, it also generates 61 MW of electricity from the burning of volatiles and black liquor. The plant was built in 2004 and is owned by Celulosa Arauco y Constitución also called CELCO.

== Río Cruces contamination controversy ==
In 2004 and 2005 thousands of black-necked swans in the Carlos Anwandter Nature Sanctuary in Chile died or migrated away following major contamination by a newly opened CELCO pulp mill located near the city of Mariquina and Cruces River which feeds the wetlands. By August 2005, the birds in the sanctuary had been "wiped out"; only four birds could be observed from a population formerly estimated at 5,000 birds. Autopsies on dead swans attributed the deaths to high levels of iron and other metals polluting the water. The company had been dumping dioxins and heavy metals into the river illegally from a wastetube that had not been approved by the authorities. The plant was closed in 2005 after the company's lawyers reportedly produced a misleading environmental study regarding pollution on the Cruces River. The scandal prompted Celco's chief executive to resign in June 2005 and the company to pledge to adopt cleaner technologies. The plant reopened two months later at limited production capacity. Even in 2006 the Latin American water tribunal recommended to close down the mill.

In July 2007 CELCO agreed to pay $614 million Chilean pesos to Valdivian tourism companies to avoid legal actions for supposed losses of the tourism sector of Valdivia due to contamination of Carlos Anwandter Nature Sanctuary. In a document signed the tourism company's CELCO was exempted from all responsibility involving the contamination of Cruces River. CELCO also promised to pay $2 million monthly each of the coming three years to promote tourism. Also, a local resident group was formed named Accion por los Cisnes ("Action for the Swans"). This kept up a constant complaint to the government officials about the issue and looked for environmental reparation.

In 2014 the state of defense council filed against CELCO in a lawsuit. The Civil Court of Valdivia ordered CELCO a series of measures to repair and mitigate the damage to the wetland. The first was to conduct a biological and chemical study about the actual situation. They were also to create an artificial wetland upon the river from where the dumping was made. Then there was to be five years of environmental impact monitoring, and the creation of a wetland research with community engagement.
