= Cruces River =

River in Chile

Coordinates: 39°42′26″S 73°11′51″W

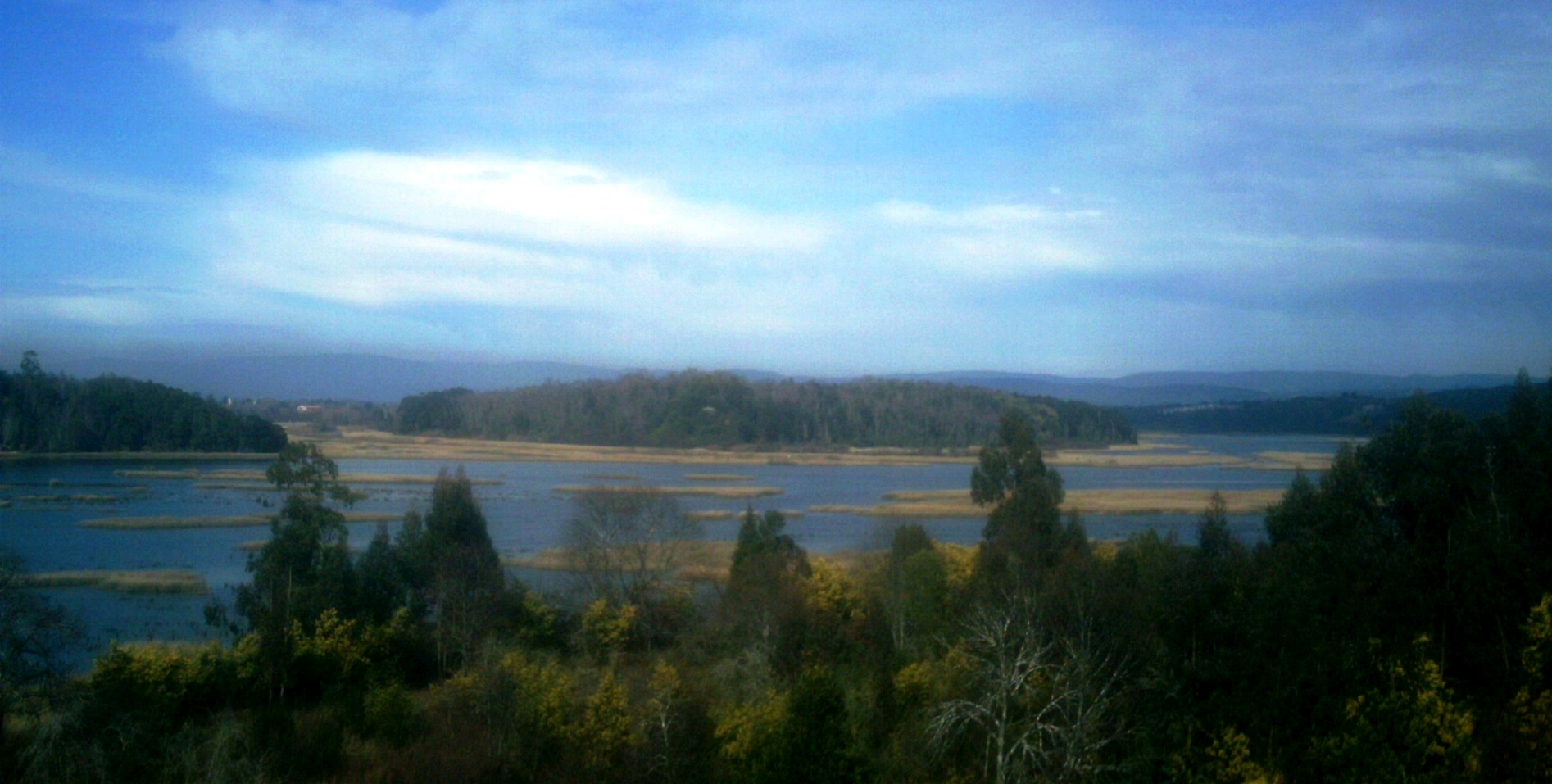
- View of Cruces River from its western shore between Punucapa and El Molino. The island of Isla Teja is seen across the river in the centre of the picture.

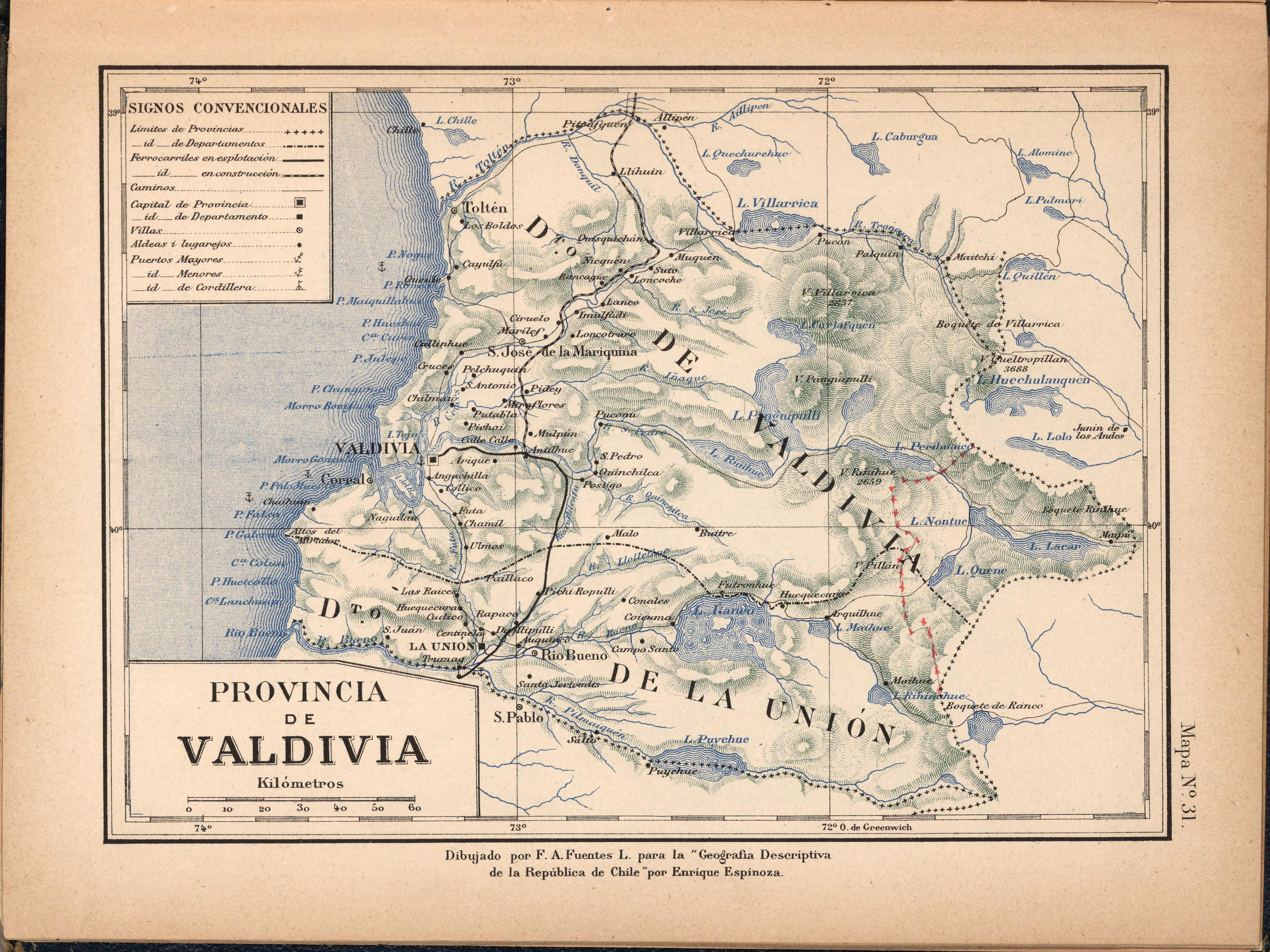
- Cruces River on a map of 1903
- Native name: Río Cruces (Spanish)

Location
- Country: Chile

Physical characteristics
- Source
  - location: Hills north of Calafquén Lake, near Villarrica Volcano
- Mouth
  - location: Valdivia River
- Length: 125 km (78 mi)
- Basin size: 3,233 km^{2} (1,248 sq mi)

The Cruces River (Spanish: Río Cruces) is a river in south-central Chile. Río Cruces originates from hills near the Villarica volcano and flows then in south-west direction. The southern and final part of the river flows in a south-south-west direction following the eastern flank of Cordillera de Oncol. At the latitude of the city of Valdivia it is crossed by Río Cruces Bridge next to its outflow into Valdivia River.

The 1960 Valdivia earthquake caused c. 2 m of subsidence around Valdivia. As a result of this, a large area of former pastures and cultivated fields around the lower course of Cruces River was permanently flooded. Over the years the new wetlands were colonized chiefly by Egeria densa (Spanish: luchecillo). Egeria densa and other aquatic plants created a rich aquatic ecosystem that attracted a permanent bird fauna, notably black-necked swans. The protected area of Carlos Anwandter Nature Sanctuary was created in 1981 to protect the ecosystem.

Coincident with the opening of the Valdivia Pulp Mill in 2004 there was a sharp decline of the black-necked swan population in the wetlands of the lower course of Cruces River. An estimated 96.4% of the black-necked swan population died or migrated in about six months. The event unleashed a large environmental conflict between citizens of Valdivia and nearby areas and Celulosa Arauco y Constitución, the owner of the pulp mill. A decline of the Egeria densa that swans feed on has been linked to the death and migration of the swans.

A 2020 study indicate that whenever the sum of the water discharge of Cruces and Calle-Calle rivers falls below 74 m^{3}/s (2,600 cu ft/s) saltwater reaches Valdivia's water supply site at Cuesta Soto in Calle-Calle River. Such events tend to happen in autumn and are expected to become more frequent in the future due to a trend of diminished rainfall.

Soils around the lower course of the river are trumaos and red clay soils.

== Gallery ==
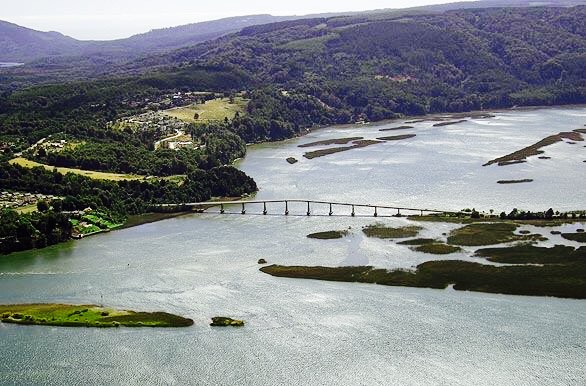
Aerial view of Cruces River at its confluence with Valdivia River

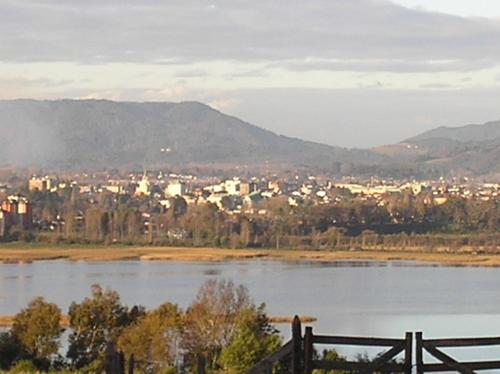
View of Valdivia from the western side of Cruces River

== See also ==
- List of rivers of Chile
