= Bird flu in Tasmania =

Bird virus that came to Tasmania in 2026

H5N1 bird flu
- Other names: H5 bird flu, (Note: the Simple name for H5N1 bird flu) Bird flu, Avian influenza,
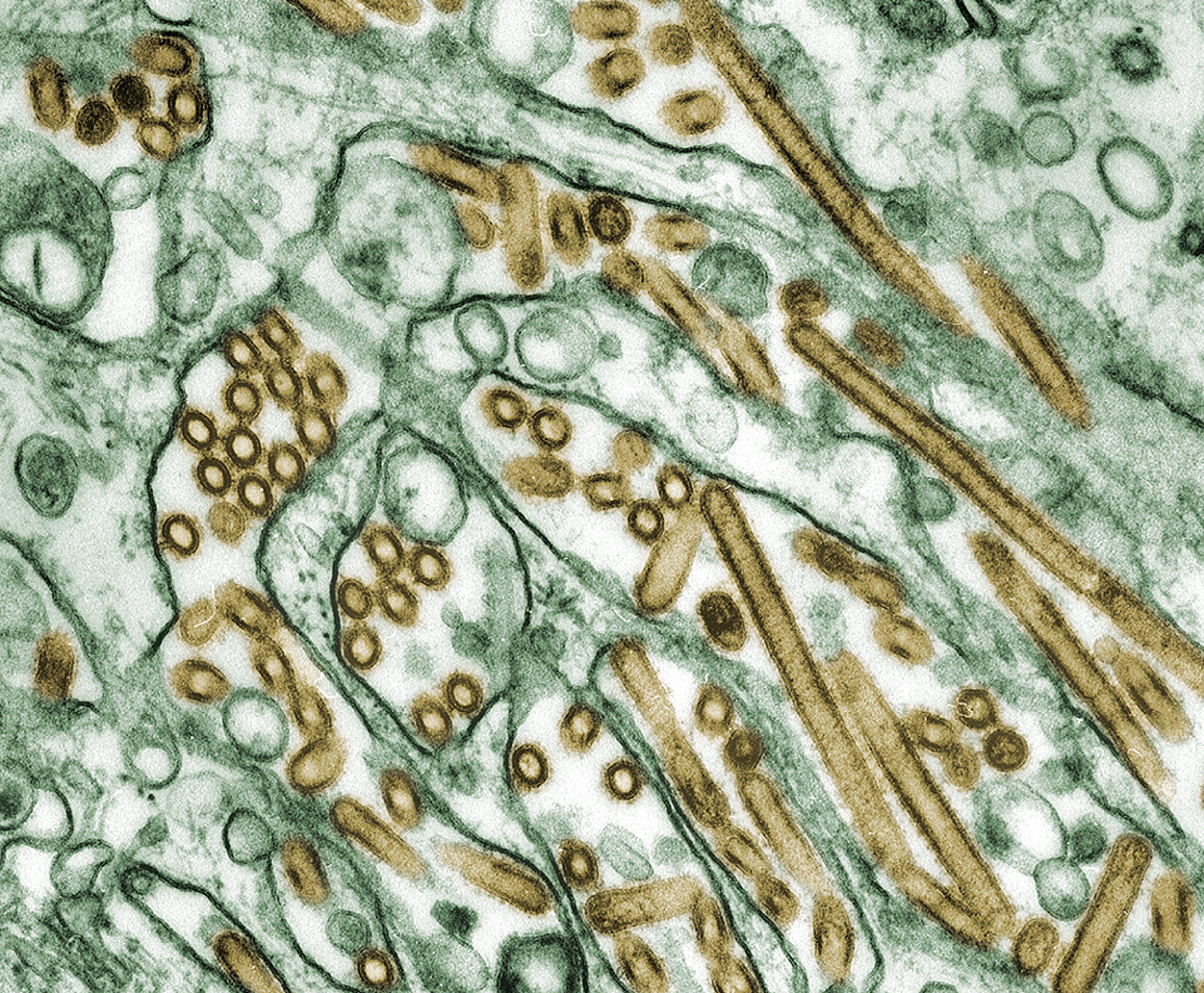
- Micrograph of Influenza A virus subtype H5N1, which is the H5N1 bird flu
- Symptoms: Sudden death (in animals), Walking or swimming in circles (in animals), Twisted necks (in animals)
- Complications: Death (in animals)
- Types: Bird flu virus
- Causes: Environmental, Transmission, and Biological
- Risk factors: Outdoor hunting (cats), Off leash (dogs), Direct contact, and Environmental exposure (humans)
- Prevention: No touching, staying away, keeping dog on the leash, preventing cats from going outdoor
- Treatment: Oseltamivir, Zanamivir, and Baloxavir marboxil (in Humans)
- Frequency: Common (in animals)

The H5N1 bird flu (Note: or simply known as H5 bird flu, or bird flu) was discovered in Tasmania on 13 August 2026, which the virus was first confirmed in a wild brown skua found at the Rocky Cape National Park in the state's northwest as the first case of H5N1 bird flu in Burgess Cove. It has since become a serious problem in Tasmania, especially among wild and domestic animals. Bird flu susceptibility remains low to the public since it cannot be easily transmitted to humans, however it is still highly dangerous and can be fatal.

== History ==
The bird flu was discovered on 13 August 2026, which the virus was confirmed in a wild brown skua found at Rocky Cape National Park in the state's northwest as the first case of H5N1 bird flu in Burgess Cove.

== Risks ==
The risk of transmission between animals is very high.

=== Risks in humans ===
Although the chance of transmission to humans are low, infection can still occur through direct contact with infected animals.

== Symptoms ==
Symptoms in animals are:

- Sudden death
- Walking or swimming in circles
- Twisted necks
- body tremors
- Full paralysis
- Loud rapid breathing
- Sneezing
- Panting
- Nasal discharge
- Swelling, and more

=== Symptoms in humans ===
Symptoms in humans are:

- Red sores
- Irritating, or watery eyes
- Sore throat
- Blocked nose
- Runny nose
- Headaches
- Chills
- Muscle joint pains, and more

== Cases ==
Cases of bird flu in wildlife animals, and domestic animals has increased since the discovery of the bird flu. Currently, there has been no case of the bird flu in humans

Cases of bird flu has been found at Rocky Cape National Park, (Note: The first area in Tasmania that the H5N1 bird flu was discovered) Brittons Swamp, Penguin, Currie (King Island), Loccota (Flinders Island), Acton Park, Dodges Ferry, Dover, Port Huon, Strahan, Stieglitz, Triabunna, Orford, Douglas River, and Macquarie Island. (Note: Macquarie Island is politically, and administratively part of Tasmania, and is about 1,500 kilometres away from the island state)

A number of Little penguin species have died on King Island, and throughout Tasmania.

== Treatment ==
Tasmania has planned for urgent vaccination since the first case of bird flu, however, there is no treatment or cure for animals.

Within humans, antiviral drugs such as Oseltamivir, Zanamivir, or Peramivir can slowly stop the bird flu.
