= Estación Tapia =

Estación Tapia Tapia
- Village
- Location in Uruguay
- Coordinates: 34°34′2″S 55°45′5″W
- Country: Uruguay
- Department: Canelones Department

Population (2011)
  - Total: 213
- Time zone: UTC -3
- Postal code: 91008
- Dial plan: +598 4399 (+4 digits)

Estación Tapia or Tapia is a village or populated centre in the Canelones Department of southern Uruguay.

== Geography ==
=== Location ===
It is located on Route 88, about 12 kilometres (7.5 mi) east of San Jacinto. The railroad track Montevideo - Minas passes by the southeast limits of the village and the stream Arroyo de los Negros flows southwest of it.

== Population ==
In 2011 Estación Tapia had a population of 213.

Year	Population
1985	318
1996	226
2004	273
2011	213

Source: Instituto Nacional de Estadística de Uruguay
