= Carlos Anwandter Nature Sanctuary =

Protected wetland in Chile

- Santuario de la naturaleza Río Cruces Chorocomayo; Río Cruces y Chorocomayo Nature Sanctuary
- IUCN category IV (habitat/species management area)
- Location within Chile
- Location: Los Ríos Region, Chile
- Nearest city: Valdivia
- Coordinates: 39.704°S 73.189°W
- Area: 4,877 ha (12,050 acres)
- Designation: Nature sanctuary
- Designated: 1981

Ramsar Wetland
- Official name: Río Cruces Chorocamayo Sanctuary
- Designated: 27 July 1981
- Reference no.: 222

Carlos Anwandter Nature Sanctuary (Spanish: Santuario de la naturaleza Carlos Anwandter) is protected wetland in Cruces River about 15 km (9 mi) north of Valdivia, Chile. The sanctuary is named after the German politician Carlos Anwandter who settled in Valdivia in 1850. This sanctuary provides a home for many native waterbird species to flourish, and contains roughly 119 species of birds alone. The most numerous bird species in the sanctuary are the black-necked swans followed by coots.

Despite being a nature sanctuary for the country of Chile under the National Monuments Act, it wasn't internationally recognized for its cultural and natural value until the Ramsar Wetlands Convention of 1971. The Carlos Anwandter Nature Sanctuary Management Plan was instated in 2016 by the National Forest Corporation (CONAF) with financial aid from the Ramsar Convention.

The invasive plant species Limnobium laevigatum is present in the sanctuary.

== Black-necked swan population ==
=== 2004 pollution controversy ===
In 2004, the Valdivia Pulp Mill was established in San José de la Mariquina, located 25 km (16 mi) northeast of the preserve near the Cruces River. As a result, the iconic black-necked swans began to experience mortality and migration issues. The population initially decreased from approximately five thousand to 942 in January 2005 and further plummeted to 291 by July 2005.

During the same year, ecologists and academic staff from the Austral University of Chile in Valdivia accused the forestry enterprise Celulosa Arauco y Constitución (CELCO) of polluting the river. Autopsies conducted on the swans revealed that their deaths were caused by elevated levels of iron and hazardous metals in the water. Consequently, the pulp mill was forced to shut down while the case underwent investigation. Even in 2006, the Latin American water tribunal recommended the permanent closure of the mill.

Meanwhile, alternative hypotheses have been proposed to explain the significant decline in the swan population.

CELCO was ultimately condemned in court in 2013. The ruling mandated CELCO to pay an indemnity of 2,600 million Chilean pesos to the state, in addition to another 2,600 million for the implementation of community development programs. CELCO chose not to appeal the ruling.

Between 2005 and 2011, the swan population did not exceed a count slightly above 500 individuals. However, by 2014, the population had recovered to over 3,600 individuals, still approximately 1,500 birds fewer than before the pulp mill's establishment.

=== Changes after 2014 ===
In April 2020, a record-breaking count of 21,123 black-necked swans was recorded in the sanctuary.

In June 2022, the National Forest Corporation (Conaf) noticed a sharp decline in the swan population within the sanctuary, dropping from 22,419 in 2020 to 2,782. No nests or eggs were found during the surveys conducted by the Conaf.

The proliferation of American minks and the incursion of South American sea lions into the sanctuary are believed to have adversely affected the swan populations. Furthermore, the use of water scooters and the development of real estate projects around the sanctuary have also been suggested as negative influences on the swan population.

In March 2023, several cases of avian influenza were detected in the black-necked swan populations within the sanctuary, prompting authorities to declare a "zoosanitary emergency".

== See also ==
- Área Costera Protegida Punta Curiñanco
- Oncol Park
- Punucapa
- Urban Wetlands Law
