= List of companies based in Minneapolis–Saint Paul =

Companies headquartered in the Minneapolis–Saint Paul area

The Minneapolis–Saint Paul metropolitan area is the 16th-largest urban agglomeration in the United States, and is home to many corporations, companies, and divisions. The core cities of Minneapolis and Saint Paul host many companies, with many others in the suburban cities.

As of 2026, there are 16 Fortune 500 companies headquartered in the Minneapolis–St. Paul metropolitan area, with another 5 companies listed in the Forbes Largest Private Companies list.

== Minneapolis ==
- Allina Health
- Ameriprise Financial
- Bio-Techne
- Bright Health
- Capella University
- Code42
- Coherent Solutions
- Coloplast US
- Conservis
- Daikin Applied Americas
- Dorsey & Whitney
- DreamHaven Press
- Endeavor Air
- EverBlock Systems
- Field Nation
- Glitch
- Graco
- Jamf
- Jefferson Lines
- M.A. Mortenson Company
- Perforce
- Piper Sandler
- Rhymesayers Entertainment
- Robins Kaplan LLP
- Ryan Companies
- Sleep Number
- Sun Country Airlines
- Surly Brewing Company
- SPS Commerce
- Target Corporation (Global 500 No. 113)
- Thrivent
- U.S. Bancorp
- Valspar
- Wilsons Leather
- Winmark
- Xcel Energy
- Zend

== Saint Paul ==
- American Public Media Group
- AgriBank
- Ballistic Recovery Systems
- Bremer Financial Corporation
- Ballistic Recovery Systems
- CodeWeavers
- Cossetta Alimentari
- Digital Angel
- Ecolab Inc.
- Hubbard Broadcasting
- National Co+op Grocers
- Pearson's Candy Company
- Red House Records
- Securian Financial Group Inc.
- Summit Brewing Company

== Suburban headquarters ==
The following companies are listed by location, within the greater Minneapolis—Saint Paul metropolitan area.

=== Anoka ===
- Chase Bliss Audio
- DecoPac, Inc.
- Federal Premium Ammunition

=== Arden Hills ===
- Land O'Lakes Inc.

=== Bayport ===
- Andersen Corporation (Forbes Private 500 No. 188)

=== Blaine ===
- Aveda Corporation (subsidiary of Estée Lauder Companies)

=== Bloomington ===
- Bethany House
- Ceridian
- Dairy Queen – a subsidiary of Berkshire Hathaway
- Donaldson Company
- Great Clips
- Holiday Companies (Forbes Private 500 No. 106)
- HealthPartners
- Jostens
- Mall of America
- Pearson VUE
- Quality Bicycle Products (QBP)
  - Salsa Cycles
  - Surly Bikes
- SkyWater Technology
- Thermo King
- The Toro Company

=== Brooklyn Center ===
- Caribou Coffee
- Surly Brewing Company

=== Burnsville ===
- Northern Tool

=== Chanhassen ===
- Life Time Fitness
- Snap Fitness

=== Coon Rapids ===
- HOM Furniture

=== Eagan ===
- Blue Cross Blue Shield of Minnesota
- EcoWater, a subsidiary of Marmon Group
- FindLaw
- Thomson Reuters
- Solventum

=== Eden Prairie ===
- Bluestem Brands Inc.
- C.H. Robinson Worldwide Inc.
- Lifetouch
- MTS Systems Corporation
- Optum
- Starkey Hearing Technologies
- Supervalu (United States)
- Tennant Company
- Winnebago Industries

=== Edina ===
- Edina Realty
- Evereve
- Jerry's Foods
- Lunds & Byerlys
- Orange Julius
- Regis Corporation

=== Fridley ===
- Medtronic (operational headquarters)

=== Golden Valley ===
- Allianz Life
- General Mills
- Mortenson Construction
- Pentair (United States headquarters)

=== Hastings ===
- Anytime Fitness

=== Hopkins ===
- Digi International

=== Inver Grove Heights ===
- CHS Inc. (Global 500 No. 259)

=== Little Canada ===
- St. Jude Medical Inc.

=== Maple Grove ===
- Great River Energy

=== Maple Plain ===
- Protolabs

=== Maplewood ===
- 3M Company

=== Medina ===
- Polaris Industries Inc.

=== Mendota Heights ===
- Brown & Bigelow
- Patterson Companies
  - Patterson Dental

=== Minnetonka ===
- Cargill (Forbes Private 500 No. 1)
- Carlson (Forbes Private 500 No. 91)
- Digi International
- Digital River
- Famous Dave's
- The Opus Group
- Polaroid Corporation
- UnitedHealth Group (Fortune Global 500 No. 10)

=== New Brighton ===
- APi Group

=== Oakdale ===
- Imation
- Slumberland Furniture

=== Plymouth ===
- Preceptis Medical

=== Richfield ===
- Best Buy

=== Roseville ===
- Old Dutch Foods
- Fantasy Flight Games
- HED Cycling Products
- Horton Holding

=== St. Louis Park ===
- Kemps
- Nordic Ware (Northland Aluminum Products)
- nVent Electric
- Regis Corporation
- Taco John's

=== Shakopee ===
- Canterbury Park

=== Shoreview ===
- Deluxe Corporation

=== Stillwater ===
- Cub

=== Vadnais Heights ===
- H.B. Fuller

== Merged, defunct or relocated companies ==
=== Merged or acquired companies ===
Soo Line Railroad is based in Minneapolis, but is owned by the Canadian Pacific Railway. The old company headquarters still exist as the Soo Line Building. The current headquarters is Canadian Pacific Plaza.

ReliaStar Life Insurance Co. was bought by ING of the Netherlands but still maintains division headquarters in Minneapolis.

Dain Rauscher was bought by RBC of Canada but still maintains division headquarters in Minneapolis.

In 2001 Pillsbury Company was purchased by General Mills (also located in the Minneapolis–St. Paul area). Parts of Pillsbury were sold to International Multifoods Corporation which was later purchased by The J.M. Smucker Company of Orrville, Ohio, in 2004.

The Musicland Group, Inc. was an entertainment company which ran Musicland, Sam Goody, Suncoast Motion Picture Company, On Cue, and the Media PlaySuperstore Chains. The Musicland Group was purchased by Best Buy in 2001.

Control Data Corporation was a supercomputer firm which broke up into Control Data Systems and Control Data Corporation (CDC). CDC currently operates as Ceridian.

Jasc Software was a software company in Eden Prairie which was founded by the creator of Paint Shop Pro. It was acquired by Corel Corporation in 2004.

PepsiAmericas was acquired by PepsiCo in 2009.

Lawson Software was an ERP software company based in St. Paul prior to being acquired by Infor.

=== Defunct companies ===
Northwestern Consolidated Milling Company produced Ceresota flour in Minneapolis from 1891 to 1953. Its Elevator A, and A and F mills are still standing and two of these structures are in use as office buildings.

Department 56, Inc. was headquartered in Eden Prairie, MN. The maker of collectibles and giftware, notably Christmas Village buildings and Snowbabies, filed for bankruptcy in 2009 after purchasing Lenox from Brown & Foreman in 2005. Department 56 was eventually acquired by Enesco and moved all operations except the artistic talent to Enesco's headquarters in Itasca, Illinois.

=== Relocated companies ===
Wells Fargo continues to have a major presence in Minneapolis, and the city is home to the Wells Fargo Home Mortgage division. In 1998, Norwest Bank of Minneapolis bought Wells Fargo Bank of San Francisco, California. Because Wells Fargo had more brand recognition, Norwest chose to rename itself Wells Fargo Bank and moved its headquarters from Minneapolis to San Francisco.

Honeywell was headquartered in Minneapolis but moved to Morristown, New Jersey to occupy Allied Signal's headquarters after the two companies merged in 1999. Honeywell's former headquarters is now occupied by Wells Fargo.

Burlington Northern was based in St. Paul until it merged with the Atchison, Topeka & Santa Fe Railway to form the BNSF Railway. It is now based in Fort Worth, Texas.

The St. Paul Companies was the oldest company in Minnesota. In 2004, they merged with Travelers and in 2009 they moved their headquarters to New York City.

In 2008, Northwest Airlines announced that it was merging with Delta Air Lines and moving its headquarters to Atlanta, Georgia.

In December 2010, ADC Telecommunications was purchased by TE Connectivity. By May 2011, they had moved the operations out of the Eden Prairie HQ of ADC to other facilities. TE Connectivity continues to use ADC's Shakopee, MN facility.

Nash Finch merged with Spartan Stores to become SpartanNash and the headquarters was moved to Grand Rapids, Michigan.

== See also ==
- Category:Companies based in Minnesota (includes companies in the entire state)
