= Alumine =

Alumine or Aluminé may refer to:

- Aluminium
- Aluminé (town), a town in Neuquén Province, Argentina
- Aluminé Lake, a lake in Neuquén Province, Argentina
- Aluminé River, a river in Neuquén Province, Argentina
- Aluminé Department, a department located in the western part of Neuquén Province, Argentina
