= Mallin (disambiguation) =

Mallin may refer to:

== People ==
=== Surname ===
- Dan Mallin, American entrepreneur
- Elias Mallin (born 1981), American musician
- Fred Mallin (1902–1987), English boxer
- Harry Mallin (1892–1969), English boxer
- John A. Mallin (1883–1973), Czech-born American mural and fresco painter
- Lesley Mallin (born 1956), English athlete
- Michael Mallin (1874–1916), Irish republican
- Michael A. Mallin, American biologist
- Stewart Mallin (1924–2000), Anglican priest
- Tom Mallin (1927–1977), English novelist, playwright and artist

== Places ==
- Mallin, a village and a former municipality in Mecklenburg-Vorpommern, Germany

== See also ==
- Mallín a type of meadow and wetland found in southern Chile and Argentina
