= Moquehue =

Coordinates: 38°56′35″S 71°19′47″W

Moquehue is a town in the Aluminé department, in the province of Neuquén, Argentina. It is located on the shores of Lake Moquehue, on Provincial Route 11, 23 km southwest of Villa Pehuenia and 80 km northwest of Aluminé.

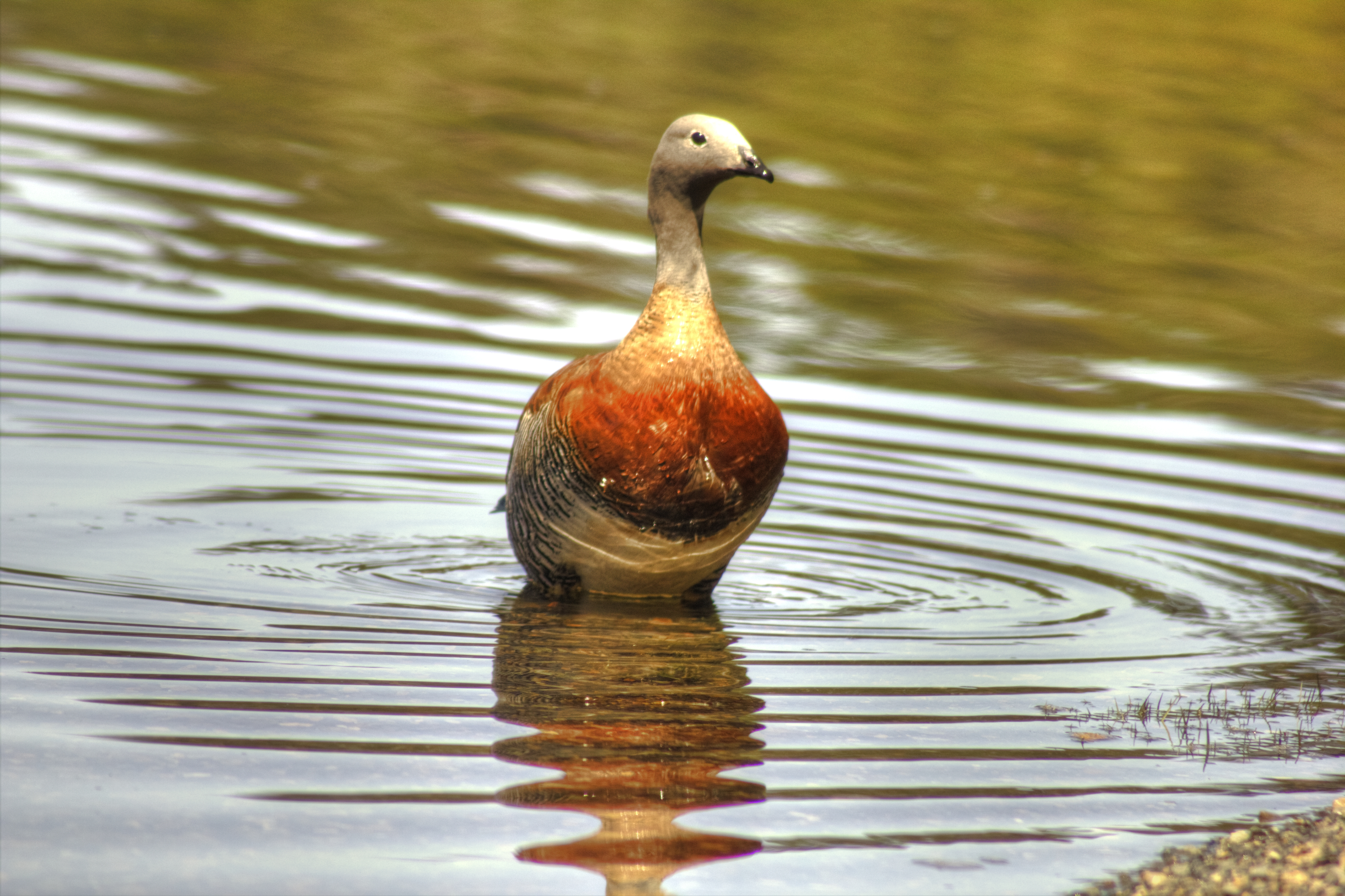
A cauquén (Chloephaga) in Lake Moquehue

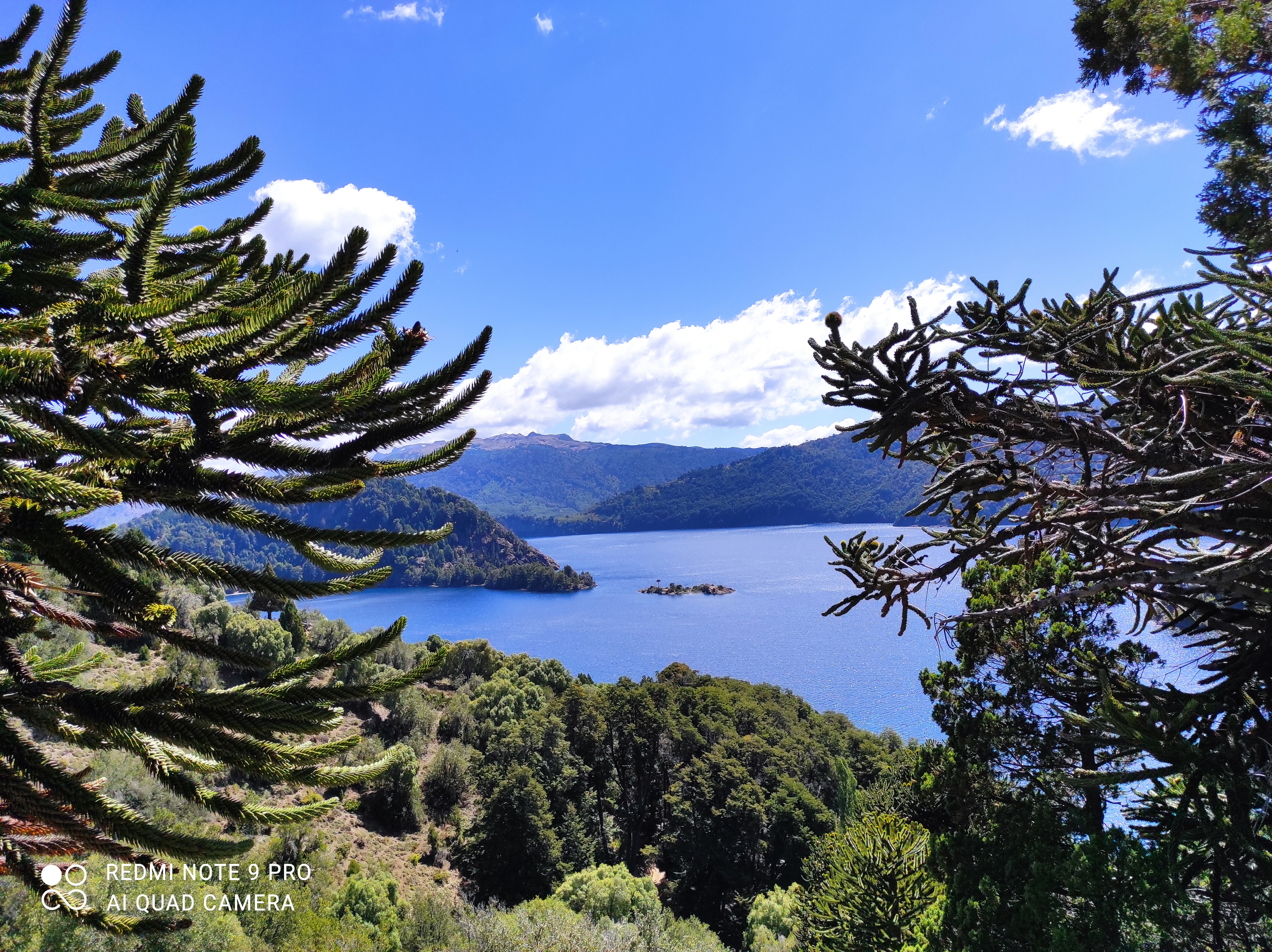
Views over Lake Moquehue

The meaning of the name Moquehue, is shady as there are several unofficial versions about its meaning. Some of them are: “place where there is maqui (Aristotelia chilensis)”, “place where there is abundance of food”, “place of love” and “place of premonitions or dreams”. The Maqui is a tree that bears a fruit that is highly prized by indigenous cultures, but it is not often seen in the Villa Pehuenia area. For this reason, it is not known with certainty if the meaning of Moquehue that refers to this species is correct.

It is believed that the region that Villa Pehuenia and Moquehue occupy today has been populated for 10 thousand years. At that time, the valley was home to numerous hunting and gathering peoples who gave rise to the Pehuenche culture.

Until 1881, the entire territory of Villa Pehuenia and Moquehue was under the command of chief Renque Curá, brother of the legendary chief Calfucurá. Trade between Mapuches and argentines spread for several years in a positive way. Further back in time, Alejandro Arce, rancher from Necochea and one of the first settlers of Pehuenia, appeared. He was one of the pioneers in using the nearby mountain passes to sell his cattle in Chile.
