= Sandbox Industries =

American venture capital firm located in Chicago

- Industry: Venture capital
- Founded: 2003
- Founder: Robert B. Shapiro; Nick Rosa
- Headquarters: Chicago, Illinois, United States
- Key people: Managing directors: Matt Bell; Steve Engleberg; Anna Haghooie; Tom
- Website: www.sandboxindustries.com

Sandbox Industries is a venture capital firm located in Chicago. The firm focuses on connecting established corporations with disruptive startups via strategic corporate investment funds.

== History ==
Sandbox was founded in Chicago in 2003 by Bob Shapiro and Nick Rosa.

At its outset, Sandbox ran a startup Foundry that employed entrepreneurs and tasked them with researching and testing the viability of a startup concept. These companies were provided with seed funding, mentorship, and office space in exchange for equity. Portfolio companies include Lab42, FeeFighters and Marbles: The Brain Store. The firm has since ceased the internal founding of its own startups to focus on connecting corporate partners with entrepreneurs outside its own walls.

Sandbox Industries also founded two new business accelerators, Healthbox and Excelerate.

Healthbox, founded in 2011 and a strategic partner of BCBSVP, began as a three-month startup accelerator program that provides seed capital, mentorship, office space, and advisors to healthcare-related companies. Healthbox also launched Healthbox Solutions, which expedited market entry for early-stage healthcare companies; the Healthbox Foundry, an evaluation and commercialization process designed to help organizations advance internal innovation; and Healthbox Collaborative Innovation Funds, which Healthbox developed alongside healthcare organizations to meet their individual needs. In November 2014, Healthbox announced a partnership with Intermountain Healthcare to work with its Intermountain Foundry, where hospital employees with entrepreneurial ideas can work to make them a reality.

Excelerate, founded in 2010 and based in Chicago, was a three-month startup accelerator program for tech-enabled startups. It has since become a part of the TechStars accelerator network as TechStars Chicago. Excelerate was named one of Tech Cocktail's Top 15 USA Startup Accelerators in 2012.

== Funds ==
Sandbox Industries manages four Funds: Blue Cross Blue Shield Venture Partners I, L.P., Blue Cross Blue Shield Venture Partners II, L.P., Blue Cross Blue Shield Venture Partners III, L.P., and Cultivian Sandbox Food and Agriculture Fund II.

=== Blue Cross Blue Shield Venture Partners Funds I, II, and III ===
Sandbox has an exclusive partnership with BlueCross BlueShield Venture Partners to manage and invest BCBSVP Funds I, II, and III. This group sources healthcare-related startups which, if invested in or partnered with, could further BlueCross and BlueShield's own goals or provide it with insight into industry trends, and makes recommendations to the venture partners.

Sandbox Industries is the Fund manager for BCBSVP Funds I, II and III, which invest in healthcare-related startups of strategic relevance to BlueCross BlueShield. BCBSVP has made investments in Bloom Health, Nexidia, and Patientco, among others.

=== Cultivian Sandbox Food and Agriculture Fund II ===
Cultivian Sandbox is a partnership between Cultivian Ventures and Sandbox Industries which invests in food and agriculture technology companies. Fund II has made investments in Conservis, Vestaron, and EnEvolv, among others.
