= Presentes =

- Directed by: Pablo Destito; Luz López Mañe; Pablo Giles
- Starring: Ailín Salas; Vera Spinetta; Dalma Maradona; Martina Juncadella; Emanero; Malena Sánchez; Rocío Quiroz; Julián Serrano; Matías Marmorato; Leonel Arancibia; Lucas Castelnuovo
- Country of origin: Argentina
- Original language: Spanish
- No. of seasons: 2
- No. of episodes: 20

Production
- Running time: 20 minutes
- Production company: Mulata Films

Original release
- Network: Encuentro
- Release: 10 May 2012 – 28 August 2015

Presentes (stylized as :Presentes) is an Argentine teen drama television series produced by Mulata Films that aired on Encuentro from 5 October 2012 to 28 August 2015. It was directed by Pablo Destito and Luz López Mañé and written by Santiago Boyero and Germán Servidio. The series was broadcast over two seasons in 2012 and 2015, comprising 8 and 12 episodes, respectively, and was also shown by Televisión Pública.

Set mainly in a public night secondary school in Greater Buenos Aires, the series follows an ensemble of adolescents dealing with school, employment, family relationships, sexuality, discrimination, political involvement and their expectations for the future. Its second season was nominated in the youth series category at the 2017 International Emmy Kids Awards.

== Premise ==
The series opens with 16-year-old Mariana Ojeda moving with her mother from Aluminé, Neuquén Province, to Buenos Aires. Entering the school year after classes have already begun, Mariana struggles with her displacement and initially resents having been separated from her father and her former life. At her new school, Mariana befriends Estefi and Federico and becomes romantically interested in Nacho, an older student who left school because of his family's financial difficulties. Although Mariana's arrival initiates the narrative, Presentes uses an ensemble structure in which individual episodes are presented from the perspective of different characters.

The students' relationships form several interconnected storylines, including those of Mariana and Nacho, Estefi and Federico, Carla and Natu, Chifle and Ivana, and Luca and Romi. The second season follows the characters during their final year of secondary school and expands its focus to social commitment, political participation, conflicts with authority, social media and the significance of completing secondary education.

== Cast and characters ==
The series has an ensemble cast whose characters receive varying degrees of focus across its episodes.

- Ailín Salas as Mariana Ojeda, a teenager from Aluminé who moves to Buenos Aires with her mother and has difficulty adjusting to her new surroundings.
- Nicolás Goldschmidt as Juan Ignacio "Nacho" Luna, a former student who leaves school to work and help support his mother and younger sister. He becomes Mariana's romantic interest.
- Vera Spinetta as Estefanía "Estefi" Hernández, a socially and politically engaged student who participates in the student council and a neighbourhood cultural centre.
- Emanero as Federico "Fede", a student and aspiring rapper who uses music to express his anti-establishment views.
- Martina Juncadella as Carla Torres, a troubled student whose close friendship with Natu gradually develops into a romantic relationship.
- Dalma Maradona as Natalia "Natu" Suárez, Carla's best friend, who is afraid to reveal that she is in love with her.
- Nicolás Condito as Leandro "Chifle" Chiflosky, an indecisive and insecure student who is preoccupied with losing his virginity during the first season.
- Julián Serrano as Luca Prieto, a wealthy and disruptive student who frequently discriminates against his classmates. An automobile accident during the second season causes him to reconsider his behaviour.
- Rocío Quiroz as Emilia, the daughter of Paraguayan immigrants who lives in a working-class neighbourhood and experiences xenophobic and class-based discrimination at school.
- Leonel Arancibia as Gonzalo Salcedo, Emilia's neighbour and romantic interest, who is falsely accused of theft because of prejudices surrounding his social background.
- Malena Sánchez as Romina "Romi" Giuntini, Fisu's younger sister and Luca's romantic partner.
- Matías Marmorato as Javier "Fisu" Giuntini, Nacho's friend and the singer of an underground rock band, who works to support and care for his younger sister.

== Production ==
=== Development ===
The Argentine Ministry of Education was credited as the creator of the project, while Mulata Films served as its production company. Pablo Destito and Luz López Mañé directed the series, with scripts by Santiago Boyero and Germán Servidio.

The second season was produced by Canal Encuentro in association with the Ministry of Federal Planning, Public Investment and Services and Mulata Films. Its principal cast combined established young actors with musicians and online personalities, including Emanero, Rocío Quiroz and Julián Serrano.

The opening theme, "Según pasan los años", was performed by Emanero.

=== Format and visual style ===
The first season consists of eight episodes and the second of twelve. Episodes generally run for between 15 and 20 minutes, a length chosen to correspond with the short-form audiovisual content commonly consumed by teenage audiences. The television broadcasts were complemented by online material, including backstage videos produced by YouTuber Lucas Castel, short interviews with the cast and material distributed through social media.

Each episode foregrounds the point of view of a particular character. The series frequently employs voice-over narration to represent the characters' thoughts, along with close-ups, detail shots, handheld camerawork and changes in ambient sound. Some episodes begin with an event from later in the story before returning to an earlier point in time and gradually revisiting the opening scene.

Its soundtrack includes rock, rap, reggae, cumbia and other genres associated with different youth cultures. Artists whose music appeared in the series include No Te Va Gustar, La Vela Puerca, Miss Bolivia, Alika, Calle 13 and Amy Winehouse.

=== Filming ===
Much of Presentes was filmed in real locations rather than studio sets. Exterior scenes used streets, railway stations, parks and public spaces in Buenos Aires and its surrounding metropolitan area. The fictional Islas Malvinas secondary school was represented by the Escuela Petronila Rodríguez in the Buenos Aires neighbourhood of Parque Chas. Scenes involving cultural events were filmed at the Espacio Cultural Nuestros Hijos, located at the former ESMA complex, while scenes set in the neighbourhood where Emilia and Gonzalo live were filmed in the Rodrigo Bueno settlement.

== Broadcast ==
The first season, consisting of eight approximately 20-minute episodes, was broadcast in 2012. A twelve-episode second season followed in 2015.

The second season was launched with a public screening of its first episode at the Galpón Joven in Tecnópolis on 12 June 2015. The event included appearances by the cast and a performance by Emanero. New episodes were subsequently broadcast on Friday evenings by Canal Encuentro and were also distributed through YouTube.

Televisión Pública later made the second-season episodes available through its programme website. The episodes were individually centred on Emilia, Nacho, Gonzalo, Chifle, Federico, Estefi, Natu, Romi, Luca, Fisu, Carla and Mariana.

== Reception and accolades ==
Writing in La Nación, Ricardo Marín described the series as addressing adolescent problems and the social circumstances of young Argentines from a comparatively realistic perspective, without softening the situations portrayed.

The series has been lauded as for its representations of youth identities, including its treatment of political engagement, sexual diversity, gender roles, discrimination and youth cultural practices. The study argued that the programme portrayed young people as social and political actors engaged with the society around them.

The second season received a nomination in the youth series category at the 2017 International Emmy Kids Awards, where it competed against the British series Hank Zipzer, the Australian series Ready for This and the Dutch production Kasper and the Christmas Angels.
