= NYQ =

NYQ or nyq may refer to:

- Nayini language (ISO 639:nyq), a Central Iranian language
- New York Quarterly, an American poetry magazine
- Tennant Company (TNC:NYQ), an American company that manufactures cleaning solutions
