= Imaginet =

Imaginet LLC was founded in 1991, as a NeXT Computer and Apple Computer publishing Value Added Reseller.

Its initial focus on digital printing was retooled by 1994 to become an early provider of web services, a move that attracted some big-name companies, including 3M, Target Corp, Pillsbury, and General Mills.

In 1997, Imaginet was sold to the 3M spinoff, Imation, but the formal corporate culture and Imaginet's decidedly casual one were not a good fit. Within 18 months, the company turned private again. To become a private company, Founders Scott Litman and Dan Mallin partnered with Skip Gage to acquire the company from Imation and spin it out as a private entity. Along the way, Imaginet acquired the assets of the Gage Interactive Marketing Group.

As a private company, Imaginet, LLC flourished in 1999 and 2000, rapidly growing into a regional leader in eServices. The focus of the business was the delivery of web applications that provided personalized and relevant communication to their audiences. Customers included the St. Paul Companies, RBC Dain Rauscher, Cargill, Goodyear, Medtronic, United Health, Lawson Software, Express-Scripts, and Thomson West.

The business was sold once again in the final days of 2000 to WPP Group, where it became a part of J. Walter Thompson (JWT), one of the world's oldest and largest traditional ad agencies. Post sale, Imagnet, took over the JWT owned entity Cool Fire Interactive and in a move that saved many jobs as the dot com bubble burst that year, replaced Cool Fire's staff with Imaginet employees. Imaginet was rebranded into the RMG Connect international network under JWT.

In January 2010, RMG Connect was dissolved and merged with JWT. The office is now known as JWT Minneapolis.
