= Robert B. Shapiro =

American businessman and attorney (1938–2025)

- Born: August 4, 1938; New York City, U.S.
- Died: May 2, 2025 (aged 86); Chicago, Illinois, U.S.
- Education: Harvard University (BA); Columbia Law School (JD)
- Occupations: Businessman, lawyer
- Spouses: Janet Ross (divorced); Berta Gordon (divorced); Kemery Bloom (divorced); Ginger Farley
- Children: 4

Robert Bernard Shapiro (August 4, 1938 – May 2, 2025) was an American businessman and attorney who worked extensively with the biochemical corporations G. D. Searle & Company and Monsanto.

== Background ==
Robert Bernard Shapiro was born in Manhattan, New York, on August 4, 1938, the son of businessman Moses Shapiro. He was educated at the Horace Mann School and earned a BA from Harvard University in 1959 and a JD from Columbia Law School in 1962.

== Career ==
Shapiro worked in private practice in New York, and also was a lawyer for the United States Department of Transportation in the 1960s. He then served as Vice-President and legal counsel at General Instrument from 1972 to 1979. His father, Moses, was Chairman of this company from 1969 to 1975.

In 1979, he became an attorney for the Illinois-based G. D. Searle. In 1982, he became CEO and Chairman of the NutraSweet subsidiary. The FDA approved aspartame's use in soft drinks in November 1983, and Pepsi was among the first brands to deploy the product on a large scale in the United States.

When G. D. Searle was acquired by Monsanto in 1985, Shapiro moved up the management chain in the ladder, becoming Vice President in 1990, President in 1993 and CEO in 1995. He remained CEO of Monsanto until 2000. He oversaw a period of industrial expansion, acquisitions, and consumer regulatory approval for the genetically-engineered seed businesses. In 2000 Monsanto merged with the U.S.-based pharmaceutical company Pharmacia & Upjohn to form Pharmacia Corp. Shapiro became chair of this entity until he stepped down in February 2001. Fred Hassan became CEO of Pharmacia. The agricultural business of the merged entity was later spun out of Pharmacia to form Monsanto Company, a business focused on agricultural products. Pharmacia Corporation was subsequently acquired by Pfizer.

Shapiro was a co-founder of Sandbox Industries, a Chicago-based business incubator and venture fund manager in 2003, and served as one of its managing directors. He was on the board of Conservis, a Sandbox funded firm.

Shapiro was an early member of the board of directors of Theranos, the company created by Elizabeth Holmes.

== Personal life and death ==
Shapiro was married four times – divorces from Janet Ross, Berta Gordon, and Kemery Bloom preceded his final marriage to Ginger Farley – and had four children. He had two children from his marriage to Gordon - including Jim Shapiro and Nina Gordon from the band Veruca Salt - and two from his marriage to Bloom. His marriage to Farley lasted 21 years, until his death. He died from pancreatic cancer at his home in Chicago, on May 2, 2025, at the age of 86.
