= The Minnesota Cup =

The Minnesota Cup competition allows emerging Minnesota entrepreneurs and start-up companies to compete for the opportunity to meet investors and win prizes, including seed capital.

== History ==
The Minnesota Cup competition started in 2005 by entrepreneurs Scott Litman and Dan Mallin. The first competition drew 600 entries who competed for $37,500 in prize money and professional services. The second annual competition introduced a student division and began on May 26, 2006. The competition has grown over time with the top prize increasing to $50,000 in 2008. In 2009, the competition expanded with the inclusion of categories for High Tech, Clean Tech and Renewable Energy, Social Entrepreneurship and BioSciences to go along with the existing General and Student Divisions. Additionally, prize money grew to $130,000. In 2016, The prize money for division winners and runners-up was $30,000 and $5,000, respectively. The grand prize winner got additional $50,000.

== Grand Prize Winners ==
- 2005: ArcSwitch, Inc.
- 2006: Vast Enterprises
- 2007: Muve Inc.
- 2008: CoreSpine Technologies
- 2009: Alvenda Commerce Advertising
- 2010: EarthClean
- 2011: AUM Cardiovascular
- 2012: PreciouStatus
- 2013: Preceptis Medical Hummingbird Ear Tubes
- 2014: 75F
- 2015: Astropad
- 2016: Stemonix
- 2020: Blue Cube Bio
- 2021: Nanodropper
- 2022: BKB Floral Foam
- 2023: Carba
- 2024: Momease Solutions Inc.
- 2025: AcQumen Medical

== See also ==
- OrthoCor (2012), BioScience Division winner
