= Rucachoroi =

Town in Neuquén Province, Argentina

- Town
- Location within Argentina
- Country: Argentina
- District: Aluminé Department
- Time zone: UTC−3 (ART)

Rucachoroi is a town in the Aluminé Department, Neuquén Province, Argentina, it is located at an altitude of 3,234 meters over the sea level. It is named after the nearby Rucachoroi Lake. Rucachoroi means "house of the parrots" in Mapundungun.
