= Scott Litman =

Scott Litman (November 18, 1966 – ) is a Minnesota entrepreneur, co-founder of The Minnesota Cup and previous CEO and co-founder of Imaginet (sold to WPP plc), co-founder of Minneapolis-based Magnet 360 (sold to Mindtree 2016), co-founder of Lucy (sold to Capacity 2024) and today is a partner at Traction Capital.

Litman significantly contributed to his local community by helping develop and launch the Minnesota Military Appreciation Fund, which has awarded nearly 11 million USD in grants to support over 17,000 veterans’ families recipients.

== Career ==
In 1998, Litman was named a 40 under 40 by CityBusiness for the success of Imaginet. On the 135th Anniversary of the founding of the University of Minnesota College of Liberal Arts, Litman was published in the book 135 Voices representing the class of 1990.

In 2005, Litman and long-time business partner Dan Mallin co-founded The Minnesota Cup. The competition was started to promote ground-breaking business ideas and is opened to all Minnesotans. Winning participants have received over $5 million in cash prizes, opportunities to meet local investors and get exposure in the media. The intention of the Minnesota Cup is to promote the discovery and commercialization of innovative, entrepreneurial ideas in the state of Minnesota. Since its founding, it has become the largest statewide business plan competition in the United States. Over 20,000 Minnesotans have participated, with top finishers having raised $1 billion in new capital.

In 2010, Litman was named by Twin Cities Business as one of the "200 Minnesotans You Should Know" for the sale of his co-founded company with partner Dan Mallin, Imaginet to a "giant ad industry holding company" and co-founding Magnet 360 in 2008. Litman was recognized as Ernst & Young's Entrepreneur of the Year in 2014 along with his longtime business partner Dan Mallin. In 2014, Scott Litman & Dan Mallin received the Titans of Technology award by the Minneapolis-St. Paul Business Journal, honoring the region's outstanding tech professionals.

In September 2015, Litman was a recipient of the University of Minnesota's Outstanding Achievement Award. This award is given to University of Minnesota graduates who have attained exceptional distinction in their professional career or in public service, as well as demonstrated significant leadership on a community, state, national or international level. In 2015 and 2025, Litman was recognized as one of the "100 Minnesotans You Should Know."

In 2024, Litman and Mallin sold Lucy to Capacity 2024
