= Aluminé Lake =

Lake in Argentina

- Lago Aluminé
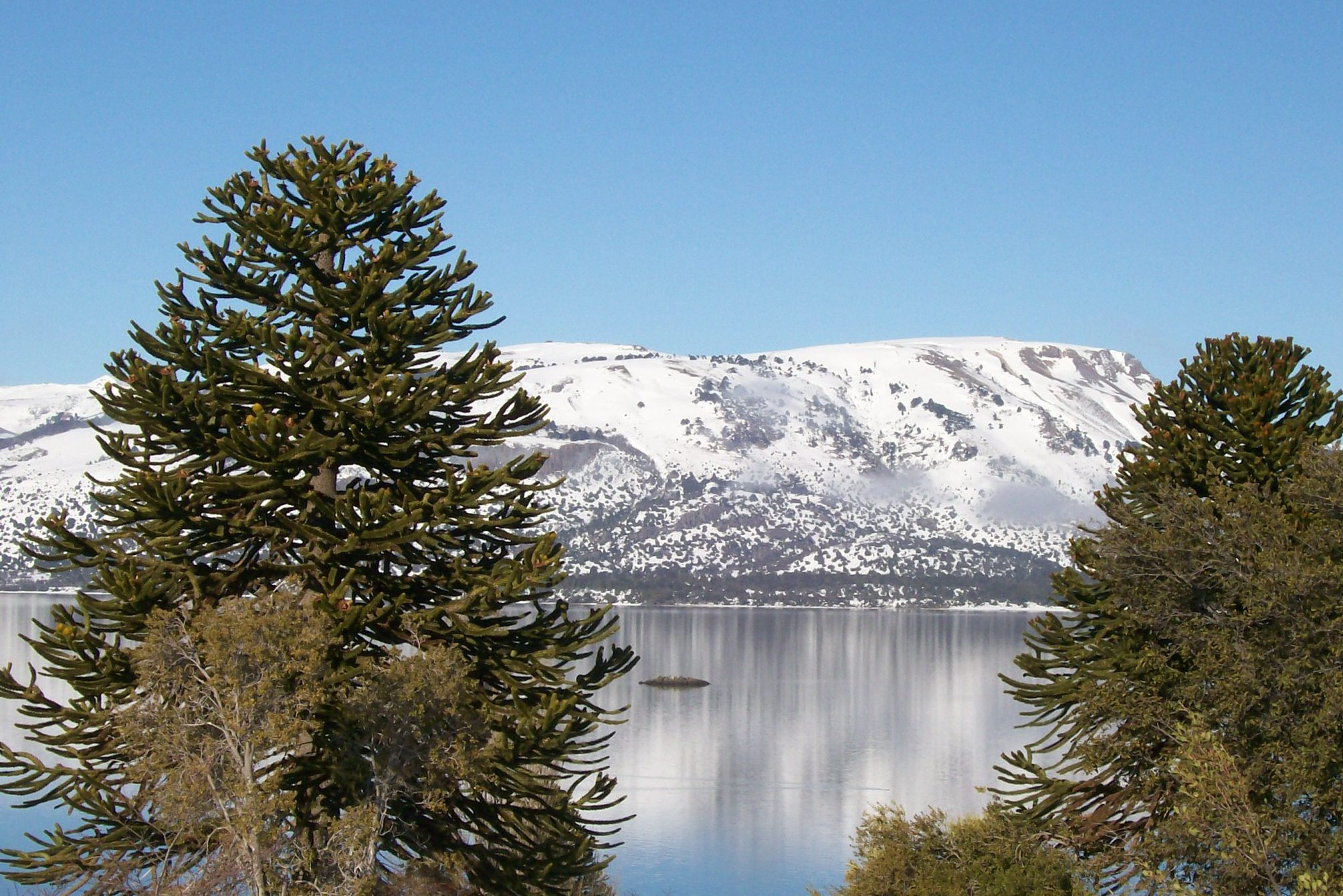
- Aluminé Lake in winter and a monkey puzzle tree.

- Location within Argentina
- Interactive map of Aluminé Lake
- Location: Aluminé Department, Neuquén Province
- Coordinates: 38°55′S 71°08′W
- Type: oligotrophic
- Primary inflows: Lake Moquehue
- Primary outflows: Aluminé River
- Basin countries: Argentina
- Max. length: 19 kilometres (12 mi)
- Max. width: 5 kilometres (3.1 mi)
- Surface area: 57 square kilometres (14,000 acres)
- Average depth: 69.4 m (228 ft)
- Max. depth: 165 m (541 ft)
- Water volume: 3.956 cubic kilometres (3,207,000 acre⋅ft)
- Shore length^{1}: 54.5 km (33.9 mi)
- Surface elevation: 1,125 m (3,691 ft)
- ^{1} Shore length is not a well-defined measure.

Aluminé Lake (Spanish: Lago Aluminé) is a large and deep lake located in the Andes in the western part of Neuquén Province, Argentina, near the border with Chile. Aluminé Lake is fed by the outflow of Lake Moquehue and is the source of the Aluminé River whose waters ultimately reach the Atlantic Ocean. The tourist town of Villa Pehuenia is on the northern shore of the lake.

== Description ==
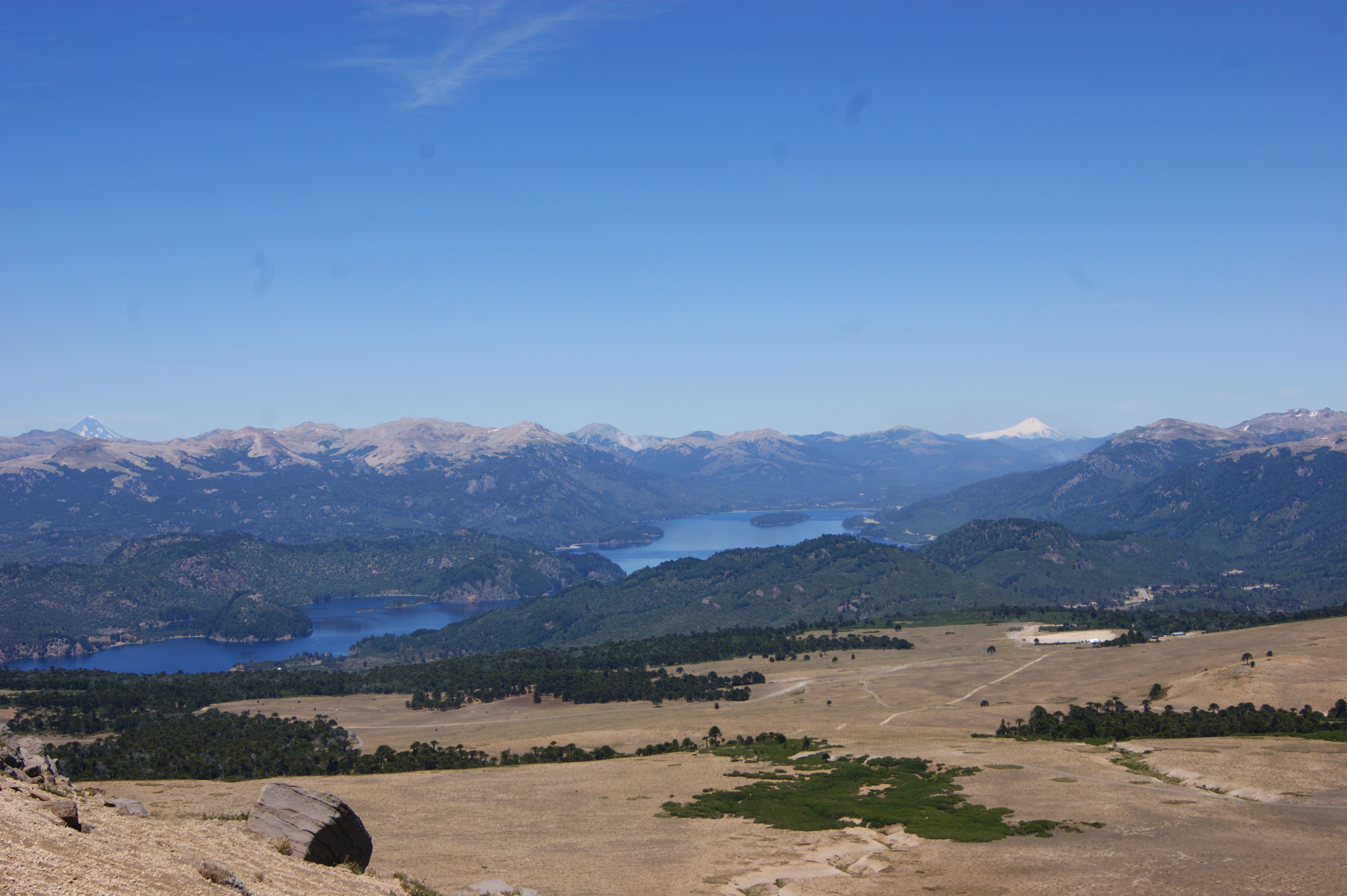
Lake Moquehue from Batea Mahuida Volcano. The snow capped volcano is Sollipulli in Chile.

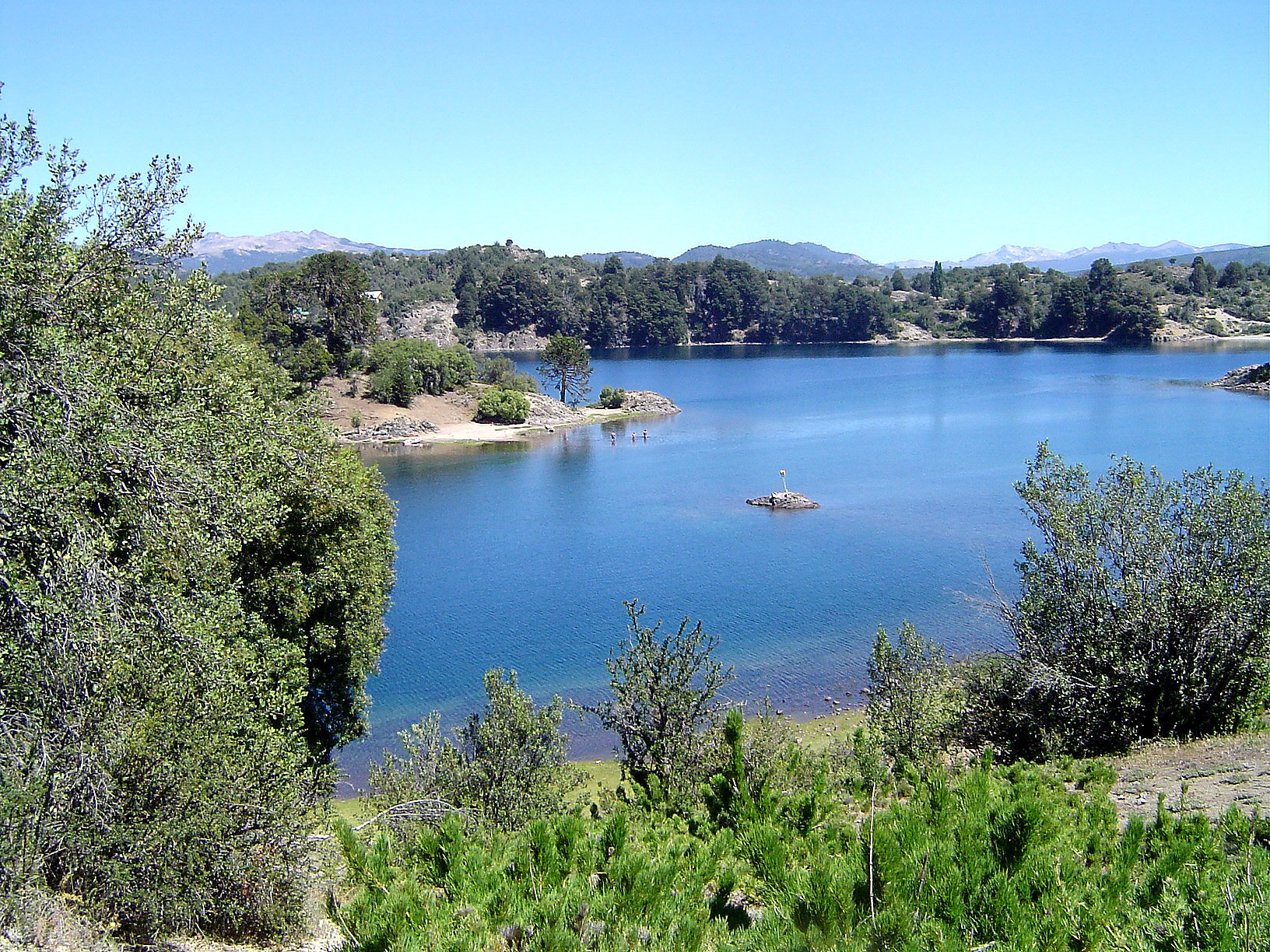
View of the lake from Villa Pehuenia.

The western shores of Aluminė and Moquehue lakes are the most northern parts of Argentina in the ecoregion of the Valdivian temperate rain forest featuring forests, lush vegetation, and heavy precipitation, especially in the winter season of the southern hemisphere. Northward from Aluminé lake the climate becomes drier and more characteristic of Mediterranean climates. The endangered monkey-puzzle tree (Araucaria araucana), locally called the "pehuen", is found here in the southernmost part of its range.

The north shore of Aluminé Lake is dominated by the Batea Mahuida volcano, elevation 1,948 metres (6,391 ft), which slopes gently down to the lake. Aluminé Lake is connected with Moquehue Lake, 12 kilometres (7.5 mi) long and 1.5 kilometres (0.93 mi) wide, via a narrow channel about 400 metres (1,300 ft) long.

Unlike many of the lakes in Argentina's lake district, the area of Lake Aluminé is not protected in a national park and deforestation through logging and wild fires has caused the deterioration of much of the natural forest cover near the lake.

The Lake Aluminé area has a warm-summer oceanic climate, Csb in the Köppen climate classification system and Crlk (mild summers, cool winters) in the Trewartha climate classification. Most precipitation is in the Austral winter.

== Economy ==
Lake Aluminé has a developing tourist industry near its banks with trout fishing, boating, and sight-seeing. Roads run along the north bank of Lake Aluminé and the west bank of Lake Moquehue with many lodging places and private residences. A road leads onward to Chile, a few miles distant from the lakes. A small ski resort is located on the slopes of Batea Mahuida volcano, operated by the Puel community of Mapuche people who inhabited this region prior to the arrival of the first European settlers in the 1890s.
