= OrthoCor =

American medical device company

OrthoCor Medical, Inc.
- Company type: Private
- Industry: Medical Technology
- Headquarters: Arden Hills, Minnesota
- Key people: Fariborz Boor Boor
- Products: OrthoCor Active System
- Website: www.orthocormedical.com

OrthoCor Medical, Inc. is a privately owned medical device company based in Arden Hills, Minnesota. Founded in 2007, OrthoCor develops drug-free, noninvasive, mobile medical devices aimed at alleviating pain and reducing edema.

== History ==
The company initially worked to address the untapped market between analgesics and joint replacement surgery. In 2009, OrthoCor received Class III clearance from the U.S. Food and Drug Administration (FDA) for the Active System.

In August 2010, the company introduced the OrthoCor Active System, a Class III medical device, following approval from the FDA. The OrthoCor Active System is indicated for adjunctive use in the palliative treatment of post-operative pain and edema in superficial soft tissue.

== Awards ==
In 2012, OrthoCor was named the winner of The Minnesota Cup At the 9th Annual LifeScience Alley Expo event, OrthoCor was a winner of the New Technology Show Case sponsored by Boston Scientific.
