= West Seventh, Saint Paul =

Coordinates: 44.9342°N 93.1126°W

West Seventh
- Neighborhood
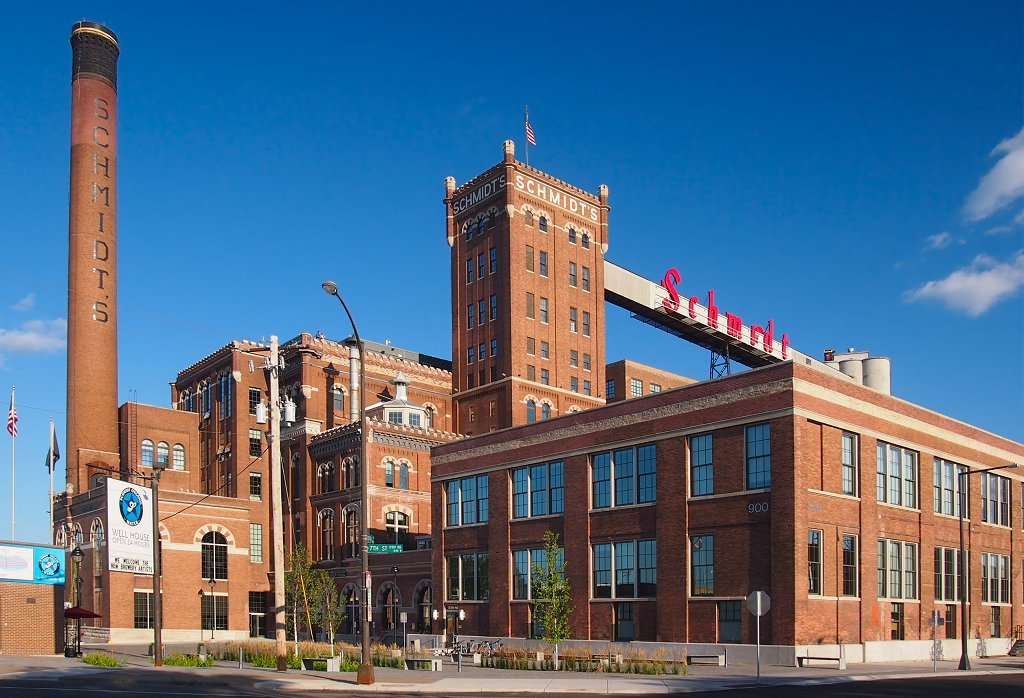
- The former Schmidt Brewery, now artist lofts
- Nicknames: West End, Fort Road, Little Bohemia
- Country: United States
- State: Minnesota
- County: Ramsey
- City: Saint Paul

Area
  - Total: 2.777 sq mi (7.19 km^{2})

Population (2010)
  - Total: 11,041
  - Density: 3,976/sq mi (1,535/km^{2})
- Time zone: UTC-6 (CST)
  - Summer (DST): UTC-5 (CDT)
- ZIP code: 55102, 55116
- Area code: 651
- Website: http://www.fortroadfederation.org/

West Seventh is a neighborhood and city district in Saint Paul, Minnesota. It comprises three smaller neighborhoods: from west to east, the West End (not to be confused with the West Side), Uppertown (named after the Upper Landing on the Mississippi River), and Irvine Park. The neighborhood lies at the base of Summit Hill and along the Mississippi River's western bluffs, spanning the entire length of West 7th Street. It is also known as Old Fort Road and the Fort Road area. The street follows a historic Native American and fur trader path along the river from downtown Saint Paul to Fort Snelling.

== History ==
The first settlement in the West Seventh area, known as "Pig's Eye", was formed by Pierre Parrant in the spring of 1838. He along with several Canadians left Fort Snelling and constructed a settlement near Fountain Cave. The settlement was quickly destroyed in 1839 by soldiers from Fort Snelling after the army extended the Fort's boundary an additional five miles. In the fall of 1838 Edward Phelan built a cabin around 8 modern blocks east of Pig's Eye. By 1840 Phelan had sold his claim for $200 to a Canadian family before moving to the present-day East Side of Saint Paul. In 1843 the Canadian family sold the claim to John R. Irvine.

Irvine built a log cabin and docked his boat along the shore. He began selling firewood as fuel to steamboats and eventually built a sawmill. Steamboats first began to stop to pick up fuel but then began to drop off new settlers and supplies. Within five years the location where Irvine docked his boat became a commercial steamboat dock surrounded by warehouses known as the Upper Landing. The area surrounding the Upper Landing became known as Uppertown by 1850. As the area grew, Irvine began selling real estate. The land around a cow pasture he donated to the city in 1849 became Irvine Park, a fashionable residential district. Notable residents included LaFayette Emmett, William Rainey Marshall, Alexander Ramsey and Jacob H. Stewart.

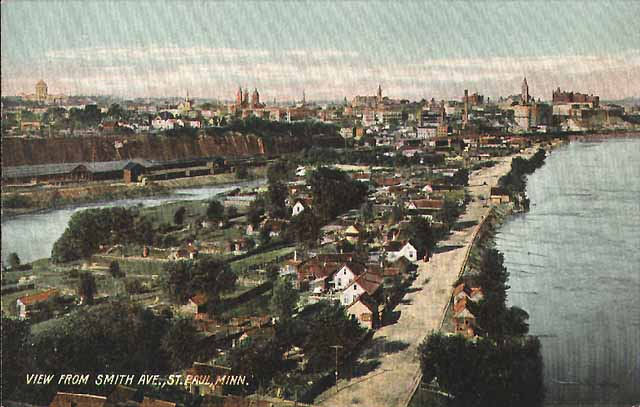
The Little Italy neighborhood of Saint Paul in 1908.

The West Seventh neighborhood was a traditional immigrant neighborhood for several waves of immigrants to the area. The first wave was mostly Germans, who built several breweries in the area by the 1860s. The next wave was of Poles and Czechs who came in the 1870s. During the 1880s large populations of Irish, German, and Czech immigrants moved to the West End. At the turn of the century a large concentration of Italians moved to the neighborhood from southern Italy. They settled mostly in the old Polish levee underneath the High Bridge. Due to constant flooding and the construction of Shepard Road most left in the 1950s. The most recent wave has been Mexicans.

== Transportation ==
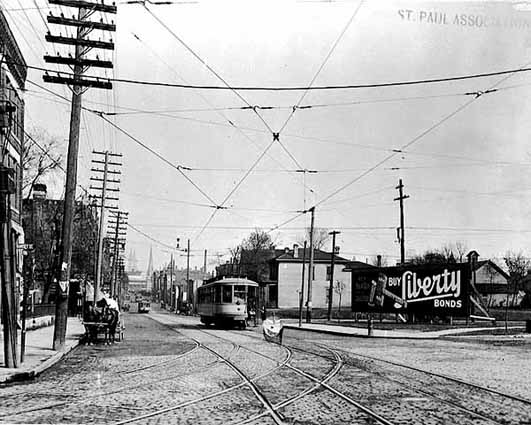
Streetcars run along West Seventh Street in 1918.

The main arterial street, West Seventh Street or Fort Road, runs southwest from downtown Saint Paul roughly parallel to the Mississippi River. The first transportation near the neighborhood was entirely dependent on the river. Development began to grow along West Seventh Street from the Upper Landing, a commercial steamboat dock.

By 1884 a horse-drawn streetcar went along West Seventh to downtown; it was converted to electricity by 1891. The line was extended the length of West Seventh street in 1891 and converted to a bus route in 1952. It is now served by bus routes 54 and 74 in the metro transit system. The neighborhood lies along the Riverview Corridor, which is considered a significant transit corridor linking Downtown Saint Paul with Minneapolis-Saint Paul International Airport and the Mall of America.

Since 1934, West Seventh Street has carried a portion of Minnesota State Highway 5. The neighborhood is connected to the Interstate Highway System via Interstate 35E. Construction of the interstate garnered significant opposition from local residents who opposed the project. After 26 years the project was completed after several changes were made to the original plans.

== Education ==
The St. Paul Public Schools in the neighborhood are Adams Spanish Immersion, Global Arts Plus, Bridgeview Focus Beyond, and Journeys. Global Arts Plus was formerly known as Linwood Monroe Arts Plus. In 2019 the school board voted to change the name due to James Monroe's ownership of slaves. The district headquarters are also in the neighborhood, as are three public charter schools: Nova Classical Academy, School of Northern Lights, and College Prep Elementary.

Saint Paul Public Library operates the West 7th Public Library within the West 7th Community Center.

== See also ==
- Cossetta Alimentari, Italian restaurant on West Seventh

== Bibliography ==
- Empson, Donald; Gary Brueggeman (1980). Kathleen Vadnais (ed.). Portrait of a Neighborhood. West 7th Federation.
