= Aluminé Department =

Coordinates: 39°14′18″S 70°54′56″W

Aluminé
- Department
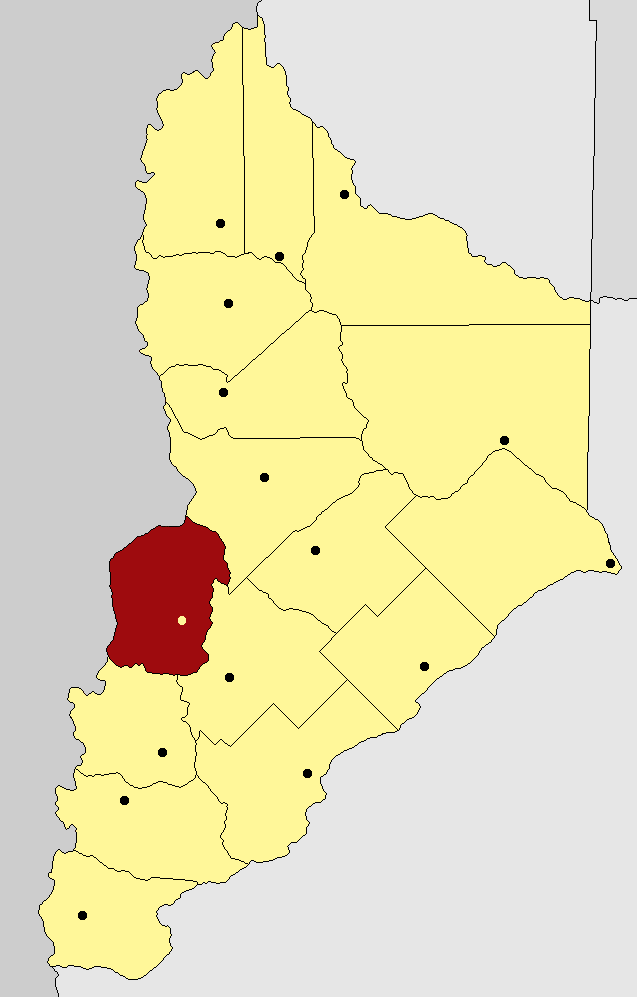
- Country: Argentina
- Province: Neuquén
- Capital: Aluminé

Area
  - Total: 4,660 km^{2} (1,800 sq mi)

Population (2022)
  - Total: 10,244
  - Density: 2.20/km^{2} (5.69/sq mi)
- Important cities: Aluminé: La Angostura; Moquehue; Ñorquinco (Alumine); Rahue; Rucachoroi; Villa Pehuenia; Villa Unión (Alumine); Kilca; Quillen

Aluminé is a department located in the west of Neuquén Province, Argentina.

== Geography ==
The department borders with Chile to the east and northeast, Loncopué Department to the northwest, Zapala Department at the southwest and Huiliches Department at the south.
