= Hummingbird Ear Tubes =

Medical device business

Hummingbird Tympanostomy Tube System
- Type: ear tubes
- Inception: 2020
- Manufacturer: Preceptis Medical
- Website: hummingbirdeartubes.com

The Hummingbird Tympanostomy Tube System, commonly referred to as Hummingbird Ear Tubes, is the flagship product of medical device manufacturer Preceptis Medical, based in Plymouth, Minnesota. Hummingbird Ear Tubes are noted for being one of the only ear tubes that can be inserted without general anesthesia.

== History ==
Preceptis Medical was founded in 2011 by Steve Anderson and Dr. Michael Loushin as a startup focused on pediatric otolaryngology.

In 2013, Preceptis Medical won the grand prize at The Minnesota Cup, a competition that awards innovative business ideas.

=== FDA and HCPCS clearance ===
In 2020, Preceptis Medical was granted FDA clearance for children 6 to 24 months of age, allowing for the Hummingbird Ear Tube device to placed without general anesthesia.

In 2021, a clinical study "affirmed an in‐office alternative for clinicians and parents who have concerns with the risk, inconvenience and cost of surgery in an operating room under general anesthesia."

In 2022, the FDA cleared it to be used in all children 6 months old and older.

In 2024, the Centers for Medicare & Medicaid Services assigned a Healthcare Common Procedure Coding System (HCPCS) code to the Hummingbird TTS procedure. This coding supports the adoption of the Hummingbird system by providing clear reimbursement pathways for ENT specialists.

== Funding & Leadership ==
Preceptis raised $1.2 million from Minneapolis investing group Gopher Angels in 2014 and $3 million in financing in 2016. It raised $3.6 million during a Series B that concluded in March of 2020.

The company has raised approximately $19M+ in funding, primarily from a Boulder, Colorado-based venture capital firm called Partisan Management Group.

In 2025, Preceptis Medical hired Dave Carey as CEO.

== Lack of general anesthesia ==
The Hummingbird is notable for the lack of general anesthesia, instead only requiring the eardrum to be numbed.

Hummingbird Ear Tubes are a manual, in-office ear tube placement that is a safe, cost-effective, and highly reliable alternative to operating room procedures for infants under 20 months. By eliminating the need for general anesthesia and fasting, this method significantly shortens the time between evaluation and treatment while maintaining high caregiver satisfaction. It also avoids the adverse reactions of general anesthesia including nausea, dyspnea and arrhythmia.
