= Nexidia =

- Type: Private
- Industry: Software; Business intelligence Speech Analytics; Video Analytics; Business consulting IT consulting
- Founded: 2000
- Headquarters: Atlanta, GA, Georgia, US
- Website: http://www.nexidia.com/

Nexidia is an interaction analytics software company that provides indexing and mining software for audio and video.

== About ==
Nexidia software helps government agencies and companies operating in various sectors, such as healthcare, technology, retail, insurance, financial services, utilities, and technology.

== History ==
The creation of the software began in the early 1990s. At that time, Emory University and Georgia Tech worked together with the desire to archive speeches by then-United States Senator Sam Nunn.

The company was founded in 2000 as Fast-Talk Communications, Inc. Founder Mark Clements studied speech recognition for 25 years, Georgia Tech graduate student Peter Cardillo created the software over five years to help recognize individual speech sounds. In 2003, the company changed its name to Nexidia.

== Acquisition ==
January 11, 2016, NICE Systems announced the acquisition of Nexidia.

== Awards ==
- Technology and Engineering Achievement Emmy Award for Phonetic Indexing and Timing - 2015
- Speech Technology Magazine - Star Performer Award for bringing "Advanced Science to Analytics" - 2015
- Operational Innovation Award - Customer Excellence for Nexidia Interaction Analytics - 2014
- Speech Technology Magazine - 2014 Star Performer
- Customer Magazine - Speech Technology Excellence Award - 2014
- Speech Technology Magazine, Market Winner for Speech Analytics - 2007, 2008, 2009, 2010, 2011, 2012, 2013
- IBC Design and Innovation Award – 2013
- StudioDaily Prime Award Winner, Post Production Innovation - 2013 (Boris Soundbite)
- Best of Show Vidy Award, 2011
- TV Technology, Star Award 2011
- Frost & Sullivan, New Product Innovation Award, 2010
- NAB Best of Show, Black Diamond Award, 2010
- CRM Magazine, Service Rising Star Award, 2010
