= Aluminé (town) =

- City and Municipality
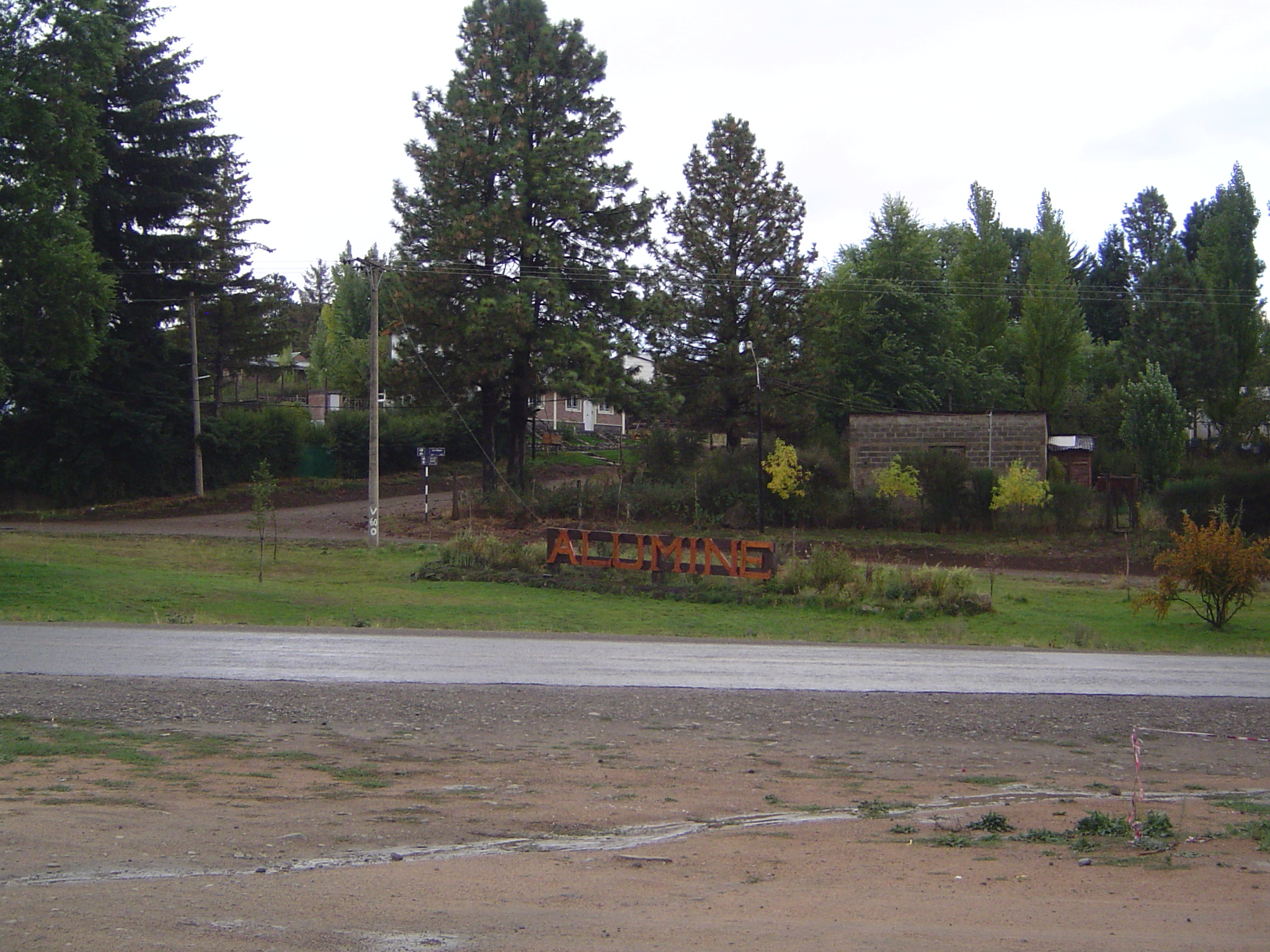

- Location within Neuquén Province Location within Argentina
- Coordinates: 39°13′S 70°57′W
- Country: Argentina
- Province: Neuquén
- Department: Aluminé Department
- Founded: October 20, 1915

Government
  - Mayor: Gabriel Marcial Alamo
- Elevation: 985 m (3,232 ft)

Population (2010 census [INDEC])
  - Total: 4,861
- Time zone: UTC−3 (ART)
- CPA Base: B 8345
- Area code: +54 02942
- Climate: Csb
- Website: www.alumine.gov.ar

Aluminé is a second class municipality and the capital city of Aluminé Department located in the west-central part of the Neuquén Province, Argentina. With an economy based on animal husbandry, forest exploitation and tourism, it serves as a service center for the nearby rural areas.

Located near the Andes, the town benefits from mountainous landscapes featuring clearwater lakes, streams and typical local vegetation, including the official provincial tree Araucaria araucana, coihue and mallín. It is a popular destination for a variety of outdoor activities, such as trekking, sport-fishing and rafting.

== History ==
Aluminé is a name of Mapudungun origin, meaning shining at the bottom, referring to the clear waters found in the region.

The territory was populated by Mapuche communities under the rule of lonco Reuque Curá before the Conquest of the Desert. The fortress Paso de los Andes was founded after the Argentine Army reached the area, and the first settlers arrived in February 1884.

The first authorities, such as the local court, the civil registry and the police station, started working in the nearby rural area known as Ruca Choroy. Aluminé was established on 20 October 1915 by provincial decree 664 in the context of the departmental reorganization of the Neuquén Territory, today the Neuquén Province.

In 1913, there were three general stores in the area. The locals used to organize caravans to Zapala and Neuquén to purchase and exchange food and other goods for agricultural products. The town grew as the years went by. Into the 1920s a series of new businesses opened. The first developing committee, as well as the first elementary school, were established in 1926.

== Geography ==
The town is located on the left shore of the Aluminé River in the Andean region of the western Neuquén Province. The general elevation is 850 m (2,789 ft) above sea level. It is served by the Provincial Route 23 with a distance of 284 km (176 mi) from the province capital, Neuquén and 1,340 km (830 mi) from Buenos Aires.

The landscape around Aluminé is mountainous with clear water lakes and creeks. The prevailing vegetation includes Araucaria araucanas, coihue and mallín. Mammal species such as mountain lions, pudú and South Andean deer inhabit the area. The bird species include the Andean Condor, black-necked swan and Darwin's rhea. A variety of trouts, such as rainbow trout and brown trout, along with perches and other species, are common in the bodies of water.

=== Climate ===
Climate data for Aluminé, Neuquen (1993–2004)
Month	Jan	Feb	Mar	Apr	May	Jun	Jul	Aug	Sep	Oct	Nov	Dec	Year
Mean daily maximum °C (°F)	24.9 (76.8)	25.3 (77.5)	22.4 (72.3)	16.8 (62.2)	12.7 (54.9)	8.0 (46.4)	8.2 (46.8)	10.6 (51.1)	13.5 (56.3)	17.4 (63.3)	20.0 (68.0)	23.7 (74.7)	17.0 (62.6)
Daily mean °C (°F)	15.8 (60.4)	15.4 (59.7)	13.1 (55.6)	8.9 (48.0)	6.3 (43.3)	3.4 (38.1)	3.1 (37.6)	4.6 (40.3)	6.6 (43.9)	9.7 (49.5)	12.1 (53.8)	14.8 (58.6)	9.6 (49.3)
Mean daily minimum °C (°F)	6.7 (44.1)	5.6 (42.1)	3.9 (39.0)	1.0 (33.8)	−0.1 (31.8)	−1.2 (29.8)	−2.1 (28.2)	−1.4 (29.5)	−0.2 (31.6)	1.9 (35.4)	4.1 (39.4)	6.2 (43.2)	2.1 (35.8)
Record low °C (°F)	−5.0 (23.0)	−7.5 (18.5)	−13.0 (8.6)	−12.5 (9.5)	−12.0 (10.4)	−15.0 (5.0)	−18.0 (−0.4)	−17.0 (1.4)	−11.0 (12.2)	−6.0 (21.2)	−9.0 (15.8)	−3.0 (26.6)	−18.0 (−0.4)
Average precipitation mm (inches)	18.0 (0.71)	11.2 (0.44)	27.3 (1.07)	60.4 (2.38)	80.7 (3.18)	216.8 (8.54)	140.3 (5.52)	115.0 (4.53)	66.2 (2.61)	56.0 (2.20)	38.0 (1.50)	26.1 (1.03)	856.0 (33.70)
Source: Instituto Nacional de Tecnología Agropecuaria

== Population ==
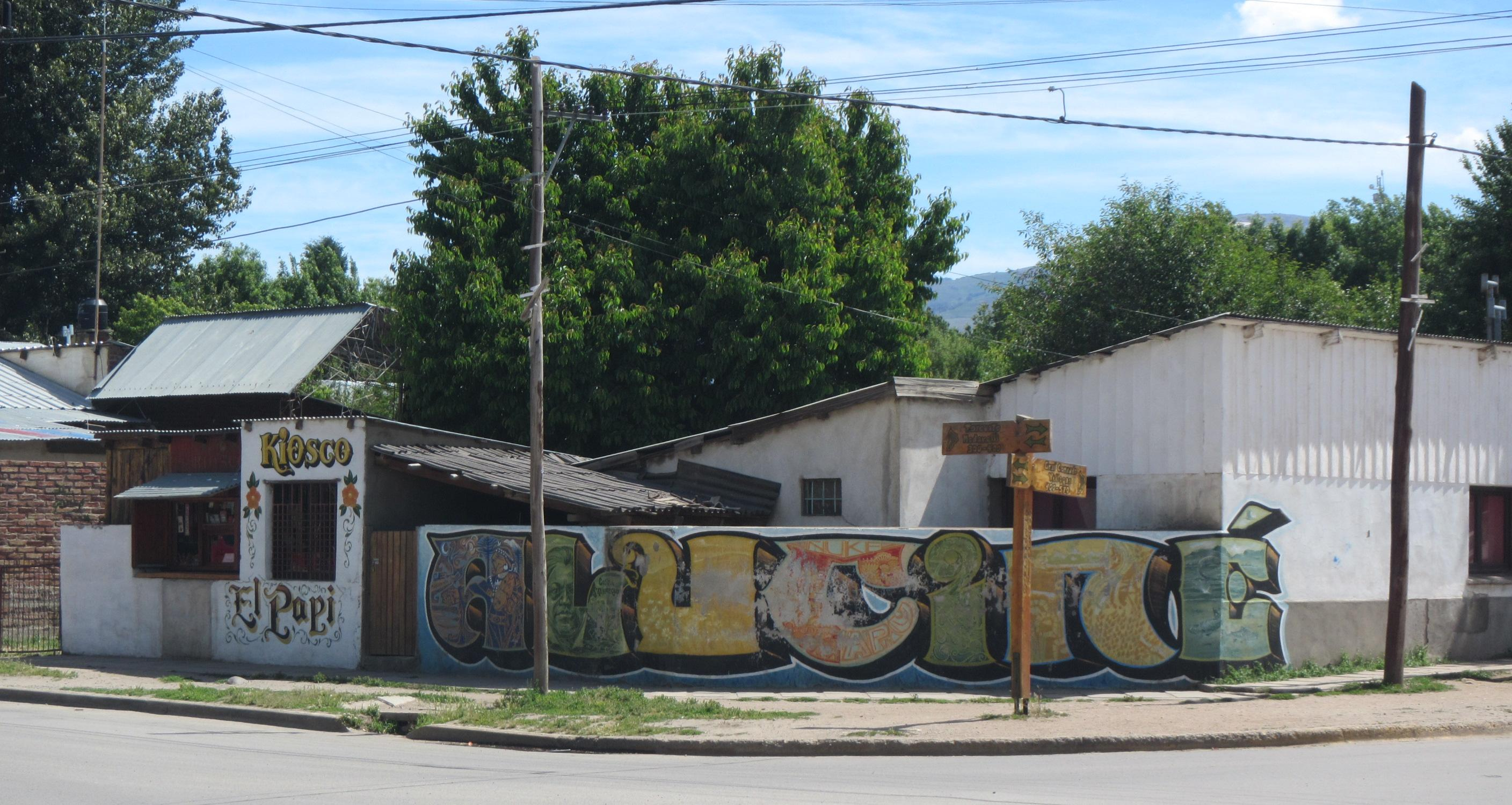
Street corner in Aluminé with painted place name in 2015

=== Demographics ===
In the census of 2010 there were a total of 4,861 residents in town, showing an increase of 32% compared to the 3,720 in the census of 2001. In 1970, the population was 1,239 people. The next censuses showed a total of 1,640 (1980) and 2,767 (1991) inhabitants, respectively.

There are also some Mapuche and araucanized Tehuelche communities near Aluminé that though influenced by the dominant trends outside their society, are open to visitors who want to know more about their culture.

=== Notable residents ===
- Juan Benigar (1883–1950), Croatian-born scientist, anthropologist and linguist who settled and raised children in the area as a garment entrepreneur, contributed to the local community by publishing different books on sociological matters including the natives' and settlers' lives in Patagonia.
- Félix San Martín (1876–1944), writer and provisional Governor of the Province, whose work covered topics of Neuquén's history.

== Economy and tourism ==
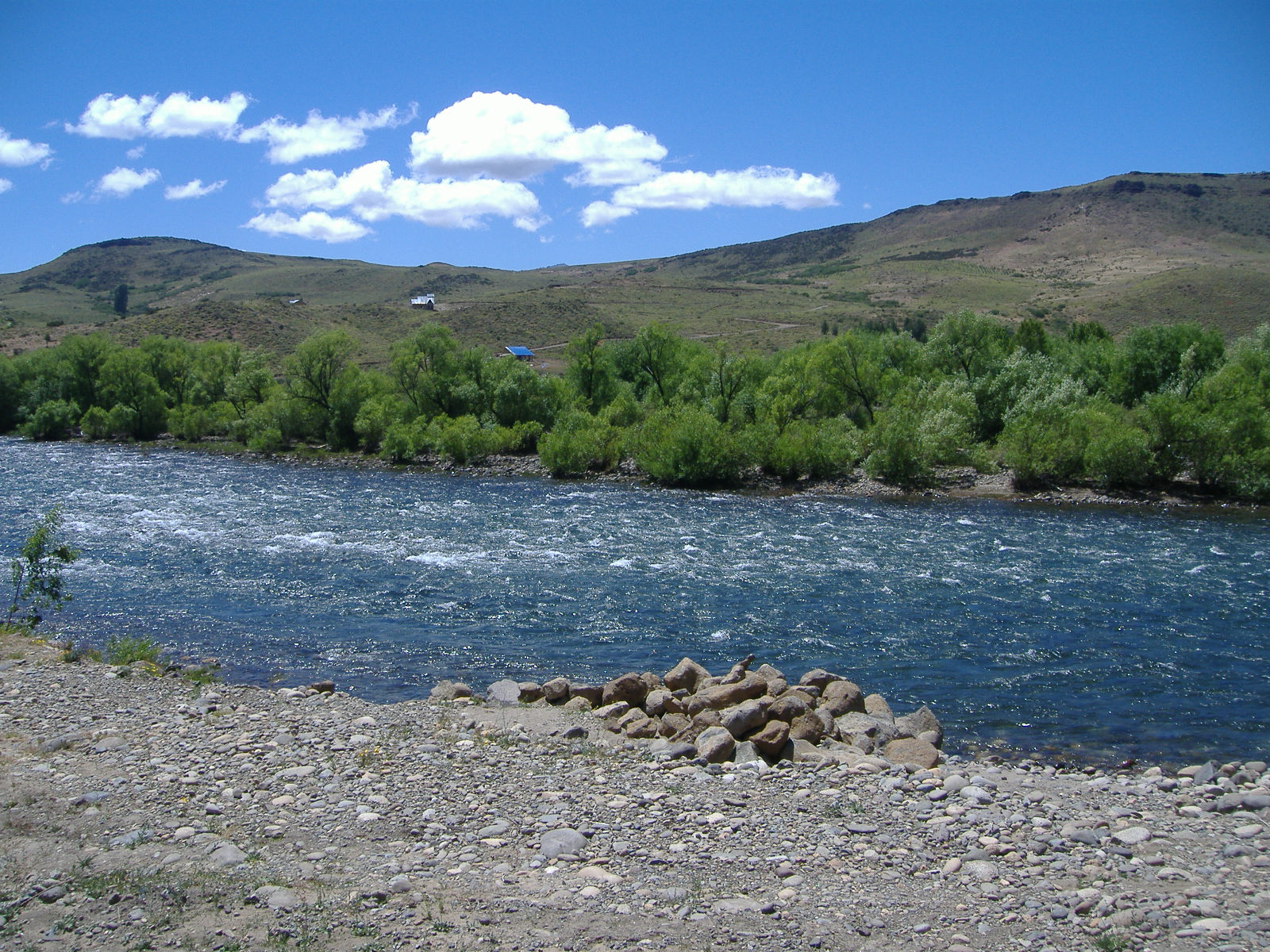
Aluminé river

As the administration seat of the Aluminé Department, the town serves as a service center for its territory. The local economy is based on animal husbandry, forest exploitation and tourism. The infrastructure is well developed with services such as hotels, restaurants, gas stations and grocery stores.

With a convenient location near the Andes in the southern Neuquén Province, the landscape is composed of mountains, lakes and streams. Aluminé is a part of tourist trails such as the Pehuén route and the Lakes Corridor. The natural environment offers the possibility of practicing different outdoor activities including hiking, trekking, horse riding, sport-fishing, rafting, and kayaking as well as winter sports like skiing on the mountain Batea Mahuida.

Several annual events take place in Aluminé. The Town Anniversary Day on October 20 is celebrated with cultural activities, such as jineteada, Argentine folk-music and a craftsmen fair. Since 1988, the local products exposition the Provincial Araucaria Festival, honoring the Araucaria araucana, the official tree of the Province.

Mapuche hand-made products can be found at the House of Culture on the craftsmen fair. The public library Juan Benigar, named after the Croatian pioneer, offers an exposition on his life and work.
