= Aluminé River =

Coordinates: 39°05′18″S 70°57′30″W

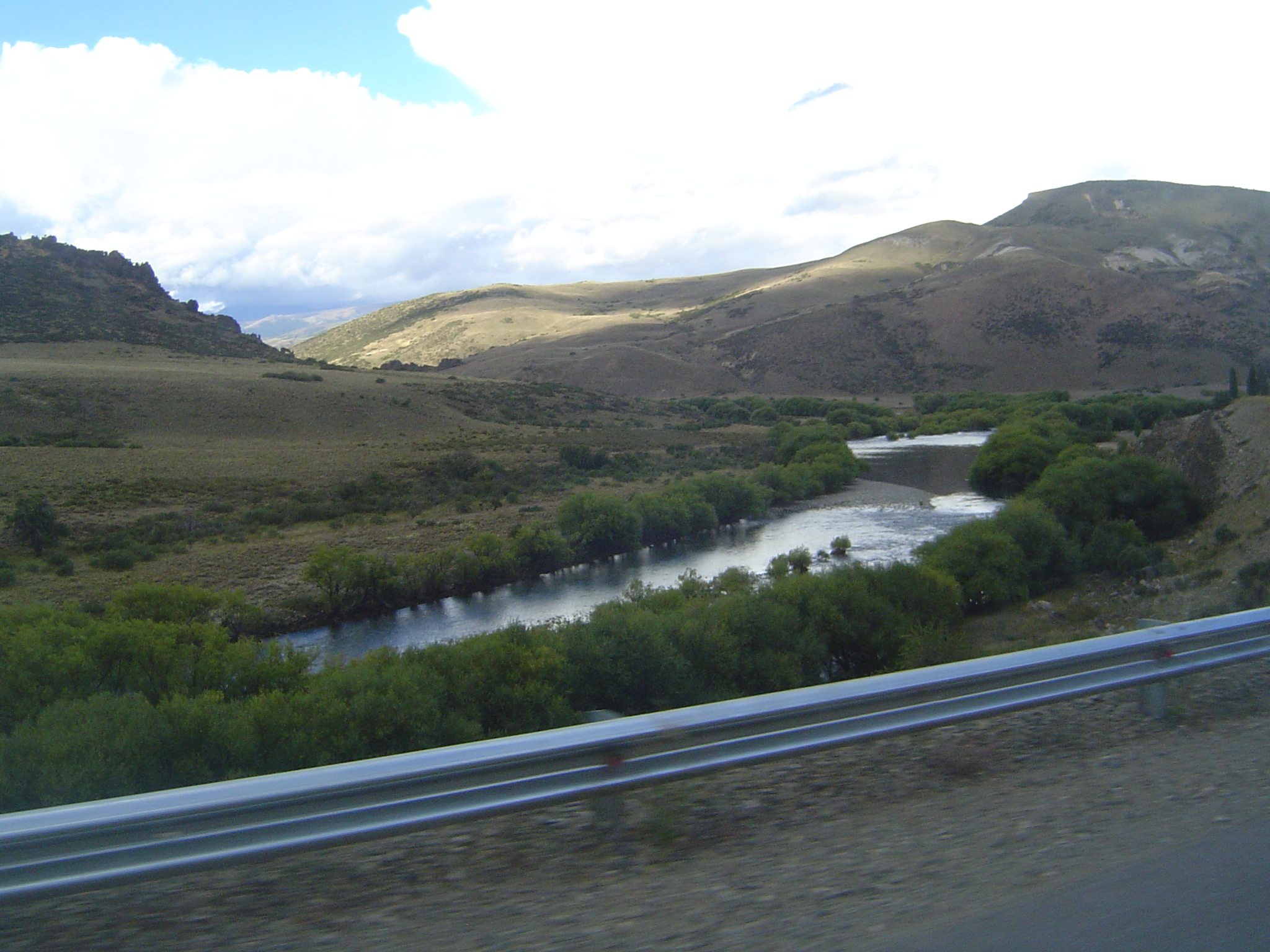

Location
- Country: Argentina

Physical characteristics
- Source
  - location: Lake Aluminé
  - elevation: 1,150 m (3,770 ft)
- Mouth
  - elevation: 970 m (3,180 ft)
- Length: 170 km (110 mi)

The Aluminé River is a geographical feature of Neuquén Province, Argentina. It flows southward from Lake Aluminé, near the town of Aluminé, for around 170 km (105 mi), past which it becomes a tributary of the Collón Curá River (near Junín de los Andes).

== See also ==
- List of rivers of Argentina
