= Cossetta Alimentari =

Pizzeria in Saint Paul, Minnesota

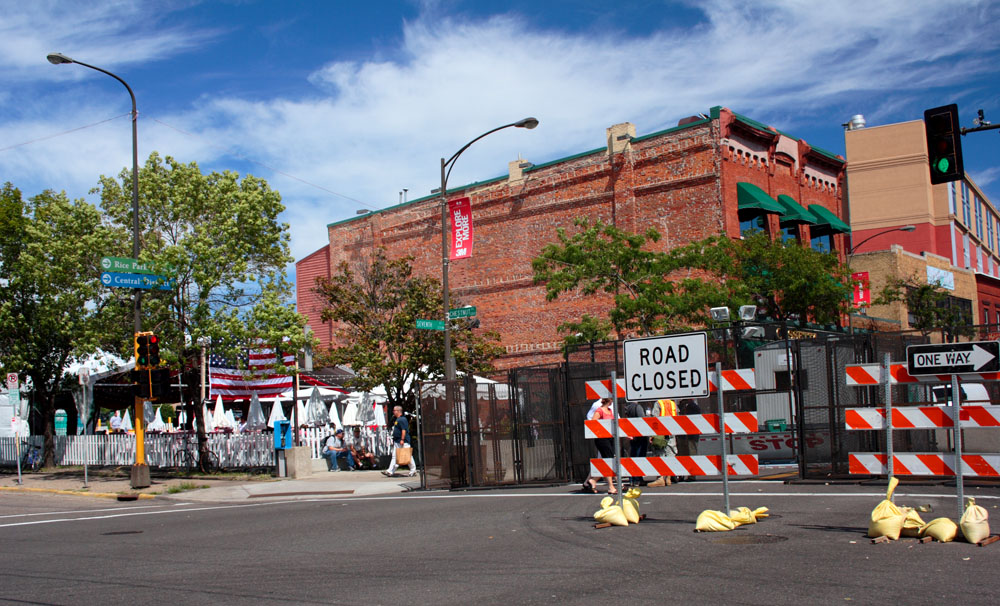
- Cossetta's building at 211 7th Street West in St Paul
- Alternative names: Cossetta's Pizzeria

General information
- Location: 211 7th St W, St. Paul, Minnesota 55102, United States of America
- Coordinates: 44.9437°N 93.1042°W
- Years built: 1911 (original market); 1988 (current restaurant)
- Owner: Dave Cossetta

Design and construction
- Known for: Pizza, Italian Cuisine

Other information
- Number of stores: 1

Website
- cossettas.com

Cossetta Alimentari, also known as Cossetta's Pizzeria, Cossetta's, or Cosettea, is a restaurant and pizzeria located at 211 7th Street West in Saint Paul, Minnesota on the corner of West Seventh and North Chestnut Street. Since its founding in 1911, it has been popular among locals and tourists for its renowned Italian cuisine, namely its pizza and panettone. According to Minnesota journalist Jason DeRusha of Minnesota Monthly, Cossetta's is one of the most popular pizzerias within the Twin Cities.

== History ==
The restaurant which became Cossetta's was originally founded by Michael Cossetta, an Italian Immigrant from Calabria, Italy in 1911. The restaurant was originally founded as a small grocery store and delicatessen. The Cossetta family settled in the Upper Levee, an Italian neighborhood in Saint Paul, Minnesota which consisted of many immigrants from the Molise region of Italy. According to the Hennepin History Museum, many Italian immigrants settled in Saint Paul in the 1860's and quickly became the fourth largest ethnic group in the state, following Germans, Swedes, and Norwegians.

In 1911, Michael Cossetta and his wife Irene Cossetta (nee: DeFranco) founded a food market in the neighborhood which sold Italian cuisine and groceries among other foodstuffs. According to the Minnesota Historical Society, the store was originally located on the corner of 22 South Ryan Avenue in Saint Paul. Serious flooding over the years led the city government to begin condemning stores and houses along the levee, which forced the family relocated to the restaurant's current location at 211 7th Street West, just south of Summit Avenue.

== Restaurant and market ==
Since the 1980's, Cossetta's has been regarded as one of Saint Paul's most notable pizzerias and Italian restaurants near the downtown area. Situated on the corner of West Seventh Street and North Chestnut Street, the restaurant is a popular spot for locals and tourists and is a popular destination for those attending events at the nearby Grand Casino Arena. In 2019, WCCO-TV reported that the restaurant and store was nominated as one of the best international grocery stores and pizzerias in the state of Minnesota. In a 2013 interview with the St. Paul Pioneer Press, Dave Cossetta, Michael Cossetta's great-great-grandson, stated that the restaurant is "a family destination - Rich people and poor people sat next to each other, and I wanted to keep that".

Cossetta's offers a wide variety of Italian food. This includes pizza, pasta, and stromboli, as well as Italian desserts such as biscotti, lingua de gato, mille-feuille, cannoli, and baci di dama, among many others. The establishment also includes an Italian market which was added to the original building during a 2010 restaurant expansion. The restaurant went under further expansion in 2012 which cost upwards $10.5 million according to the St. Paul Pioneer Press and WCCO. Currently, the restaurant is owned by Dave Cossetta, Michael Cossetta's great-great-grandson, who is the fourth generation of the Cossetta family to own the establishment. One of Cossetta's recent award-winning desserts is panettone, an Italian yeast cake, which the restaurant has become renowned for making and ships worldwide.

== Gallery ==
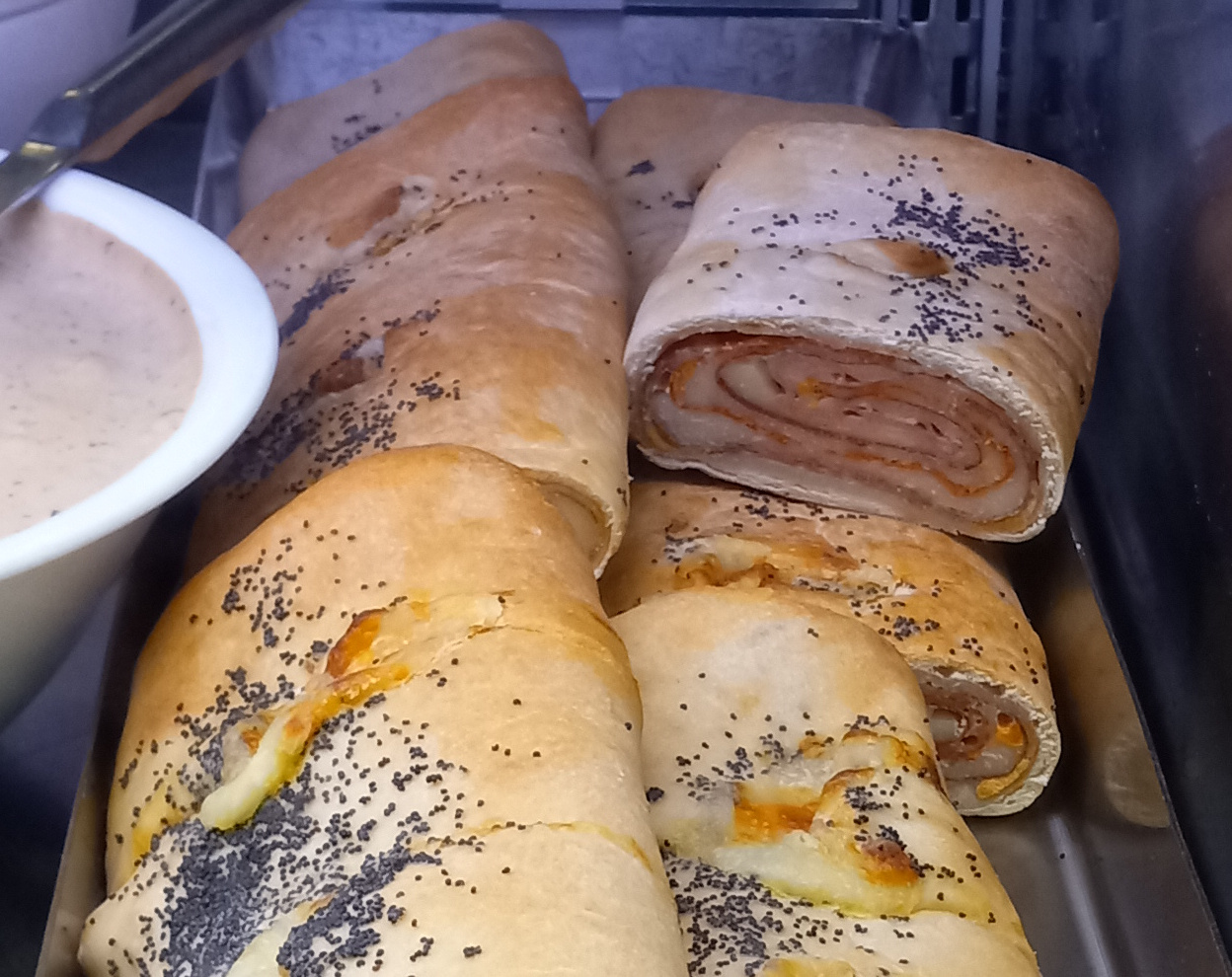
Stromboli from Cossetta's

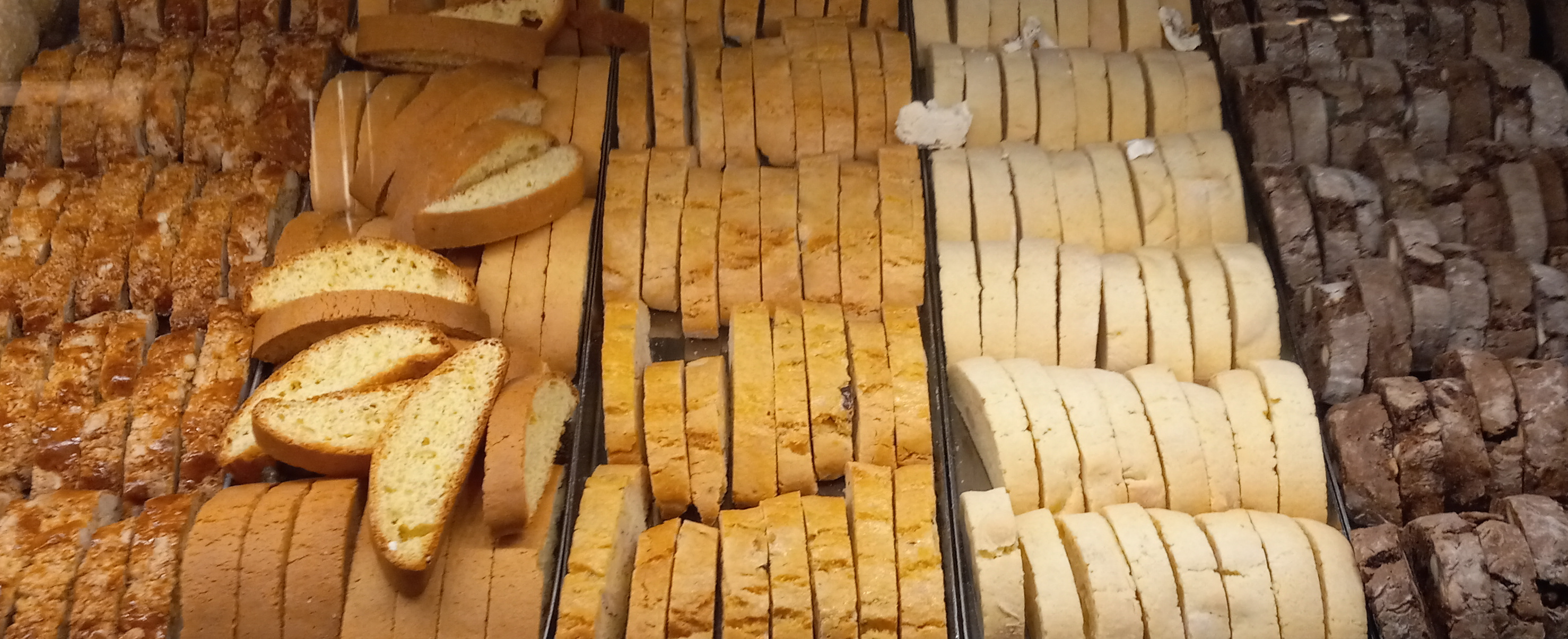
Biscotti from Cossetta's

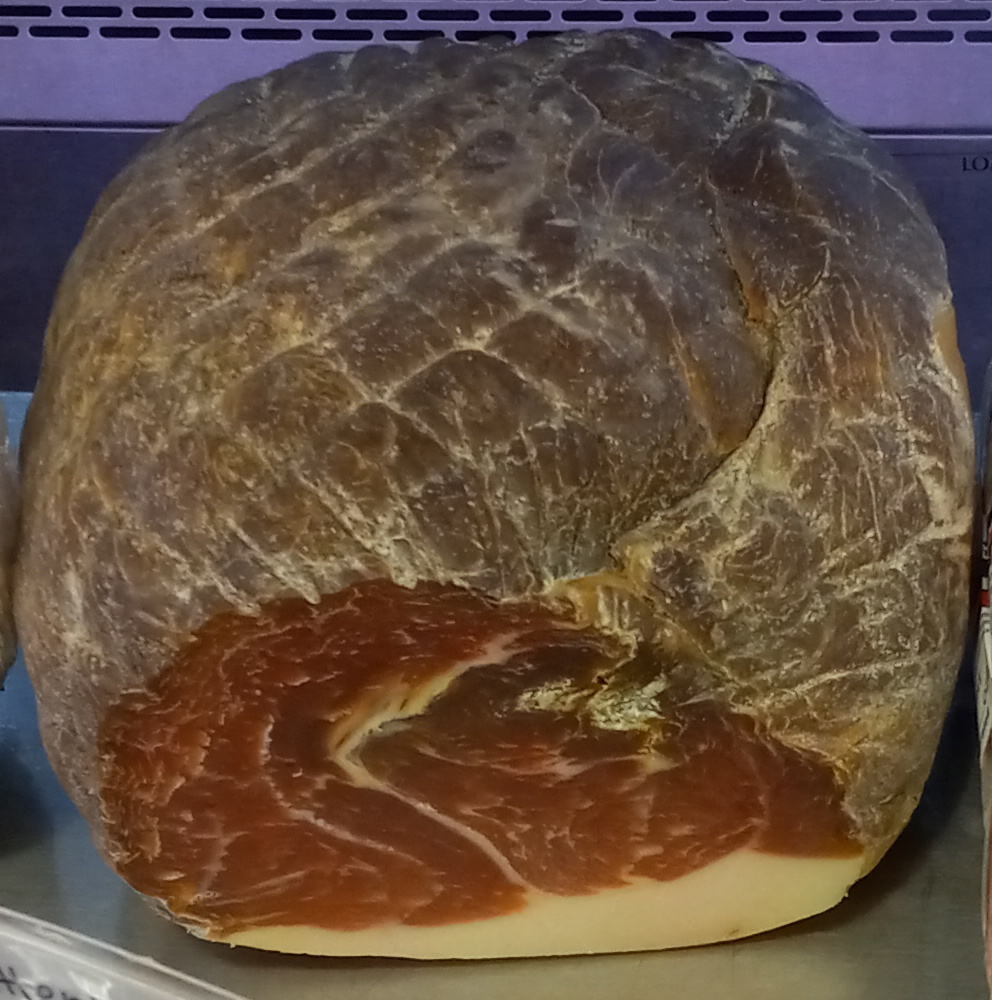
Culatello from Cossetta's

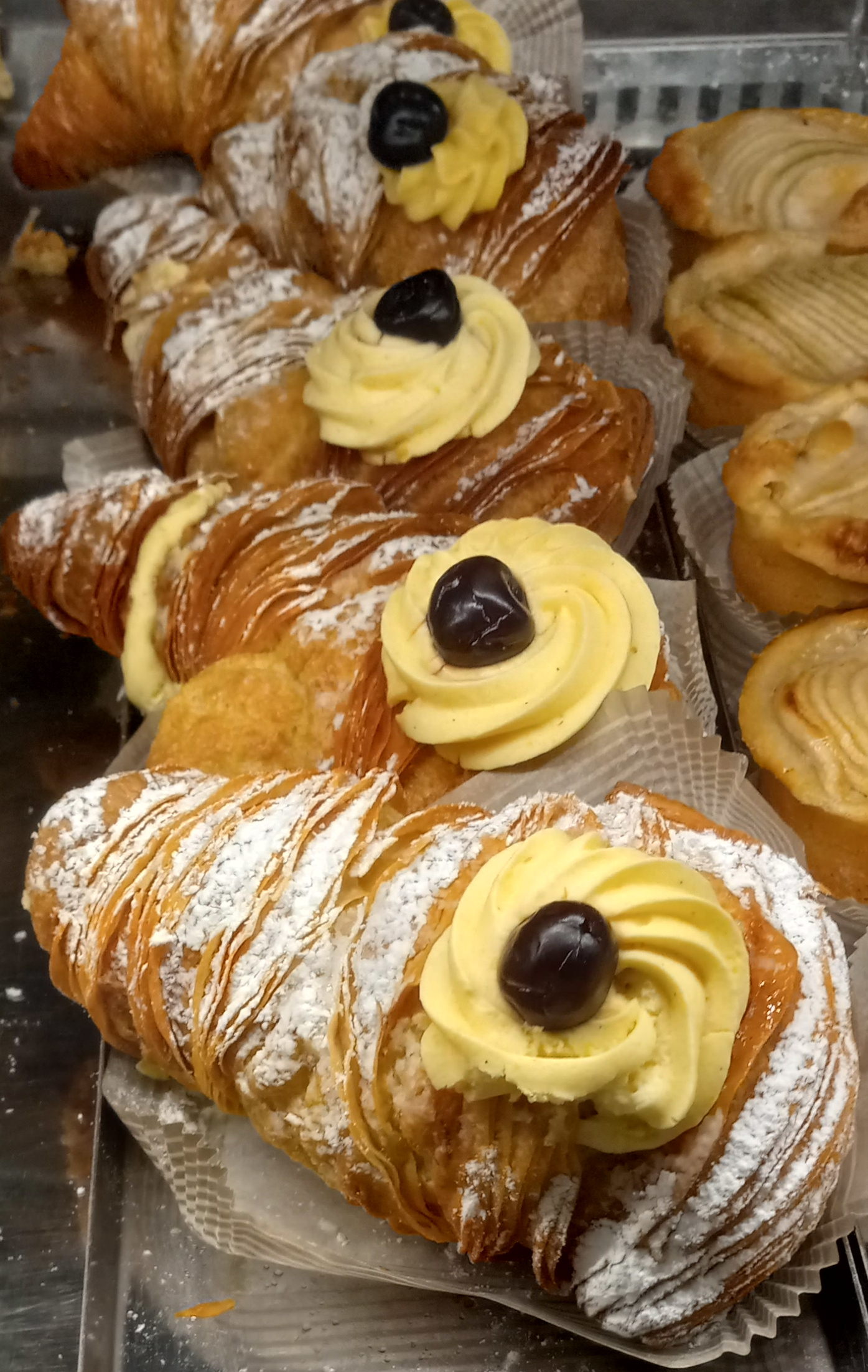
Sfogliatella from Cossetta's

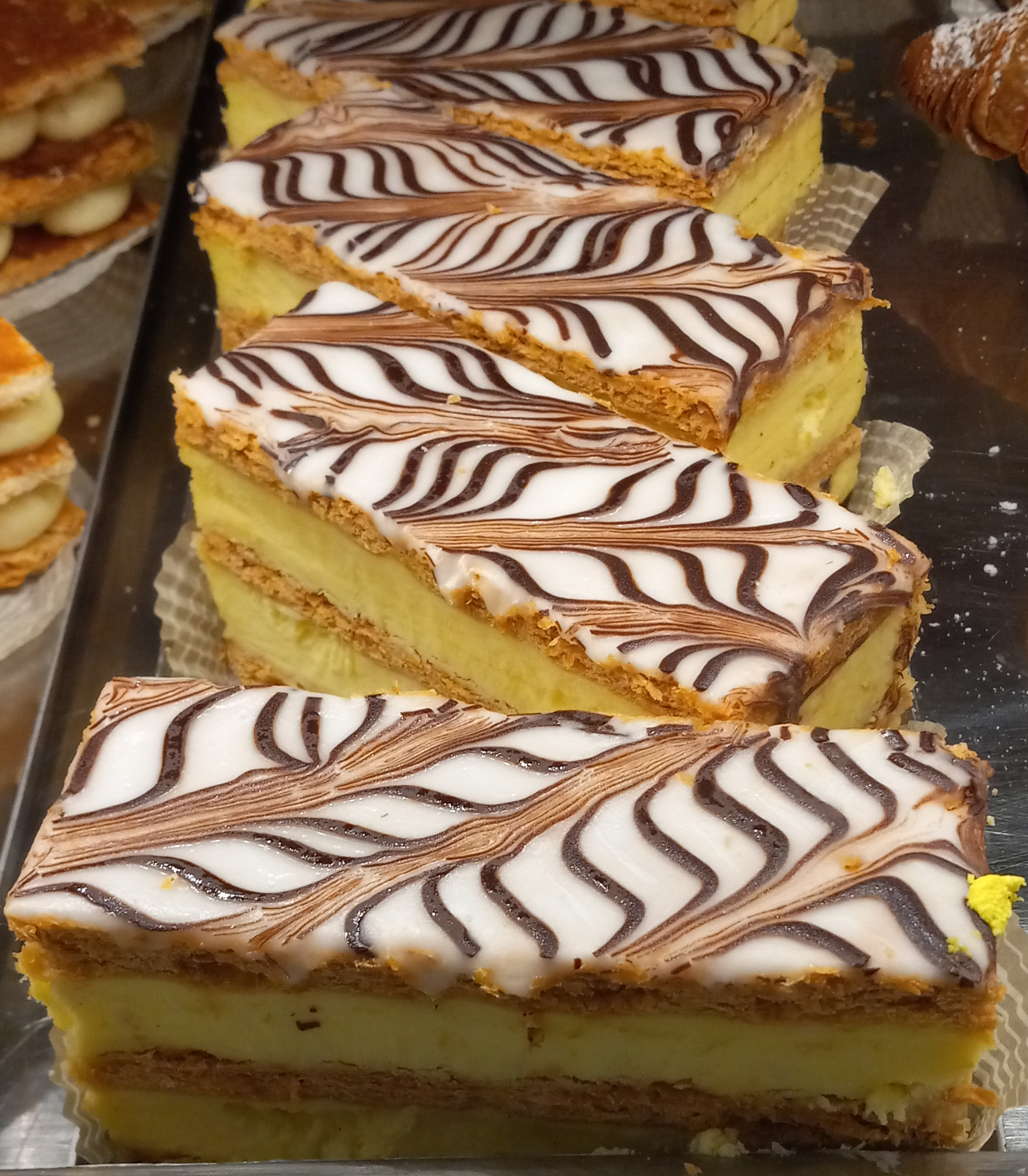
French Napoleon pastry (Mille-feuille) from Cossetta's

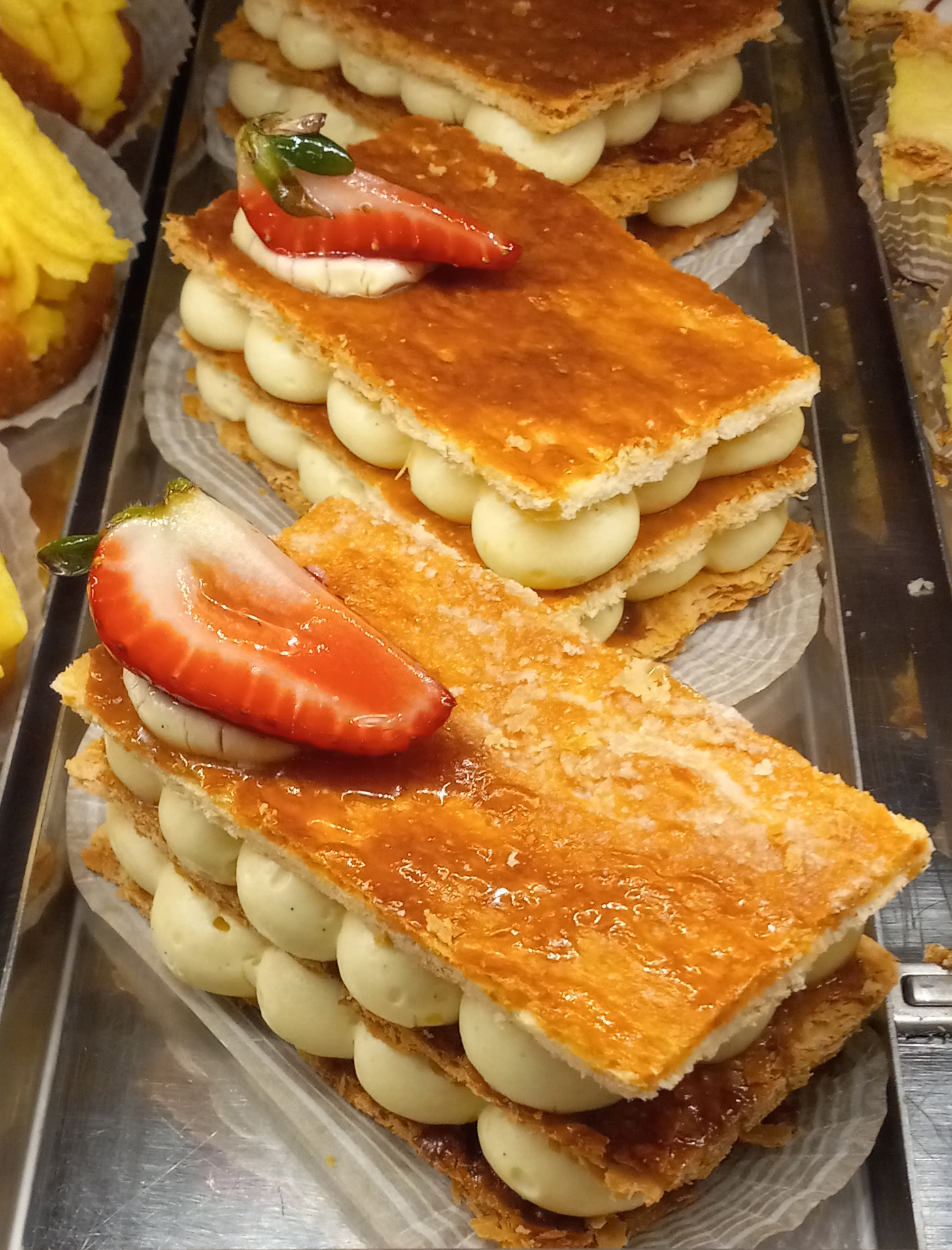
Another variant of Mille-feuille from Cossetta's

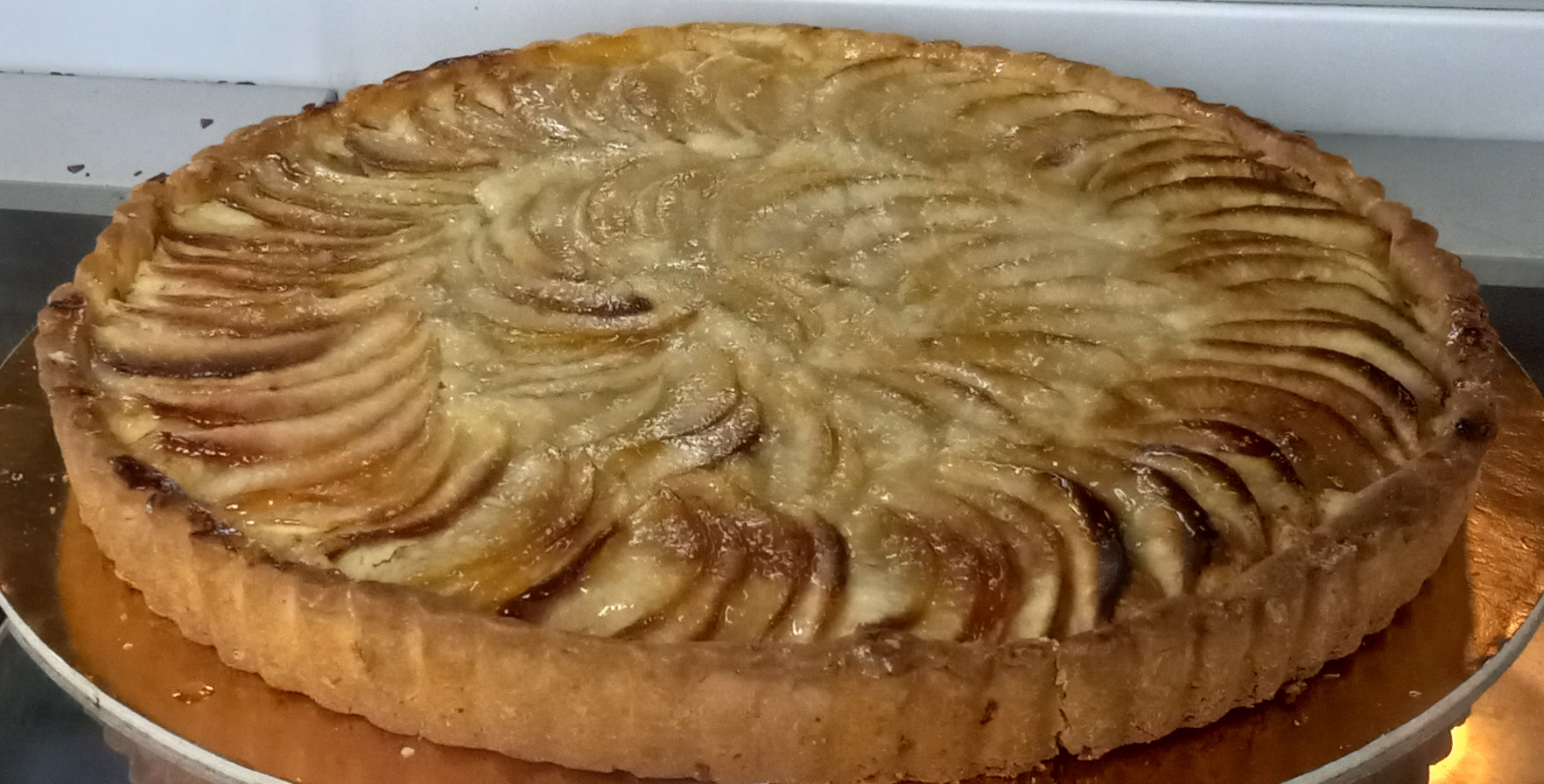
An apple tart from Cossetta's

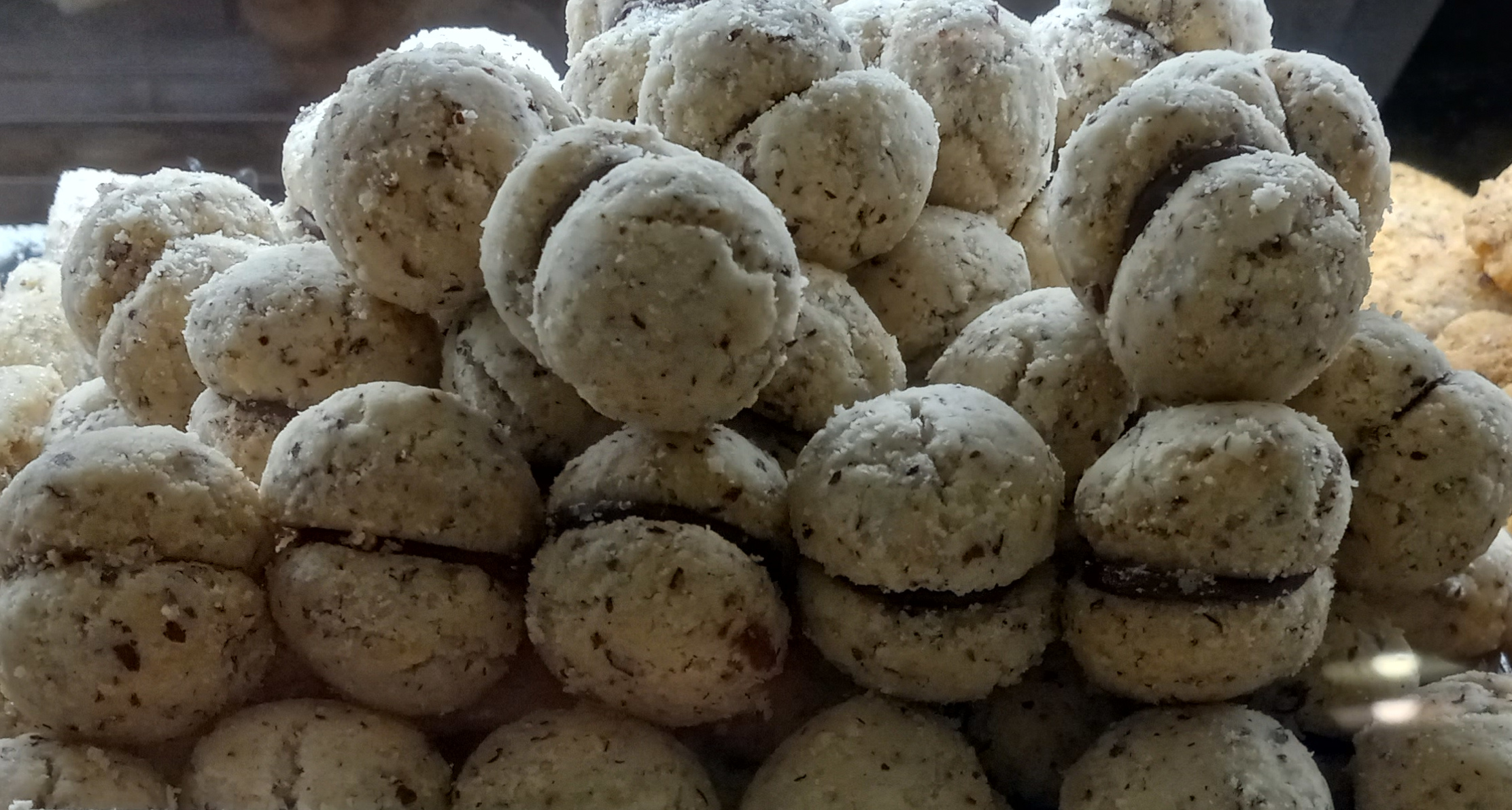
Baci di dama from Cossetta's

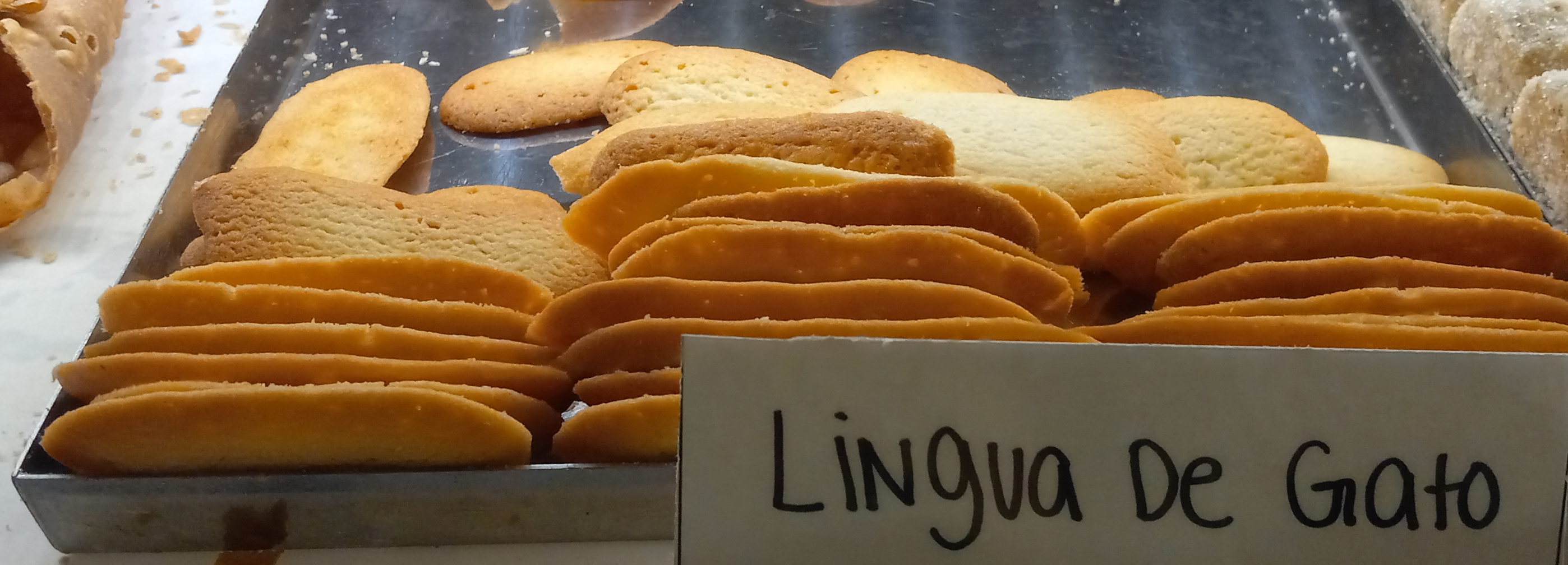
Lengua de gato from Cossetta's
