= Coherent Solutions =

Software product development and consulting company

- Type: Private
- Industry: Software development Software testing Software maintenance & support IT consulting Web development
- Founded: 1995; 31 years ago
- Headquarters: Minneapolis, MN, United States
- Key people: Igor Epshteyn, CEO
- Revenue: US$127M (2023)
- Number of employees: 2200 (2023)
- Website: www.coherentsolutions.com

Coherent Solutions is a software product development and consulting company headquartered in Minneapolis, Minnesota. Founded in 1995, the company provides software engineering, product design, artificial intelligence (AI), cloud computing, data analytics, quality assurance, and Salesforce consulting services. It operates development offices in North America and Europe.

== History ==
Coherent Solutions was founded in 1995 in Minneapolis, Minnesota by Igor Epshteyn.

In 2003, Epshteyn established the company's first international development center in Minsk, Belarus, Europe, as part of a broader global expansion effort. Coherent's Minneapolis headquarters became the company's global hub for client management and front-end consulting, while international subsidiaries across Europe and Latin America became the core technical engine for software design, development, testing, and maintenance.

In 2006, Coherent Solutions became a Microsoft Gold Certified Partner.

According to the AWS Partner Network, the company is also an AWS partner, listed as an Advanced Tier Services Partner (named an AWS Advanced Consulting Partner in 2019).

In 2017, Coherent Solutions launched a training program to introduce high school students to software development. The initiative later expanded into an international education program for employees' children, offering courses in subjects including Python, Java, Scratch, machine learning, and UX design across the company's locations.

By 2021, the company had expanded globally, establishing development offices in Bulgaria, Moldova, Mexico, Lithuania, Ukraine, Romania, Georgia, and Poland.

In 2023, Coherent Solutions was included on the Inc. 5000 list of fastest-growing private companies in the United States and was named the best place to work by the St. Paul Business Journal in Minneapolis.

In 2024, the company received both the Clutch Global Award and the Clutch Champion recognition.

In 2025, Coherent Solutions secured a strategic investment from private equity firm IceLake. The same year, it partnered with MaxContact to develop Spokn AI, a generative AI-powered speech analytics platform for cloud-based contact centres. In May 2025, the company was named a Spring Clutch Global Award winner in the categories of Artificial Intelligence, Natural Language Processing, and Robotics. In November 2025, Coherent Solutions launched The Norm, a digital experience agency created to consolidate the company's UX and UI design capabilities under a dedicated brand. In July 2025, the Minneapolis / St. Paul Business Journal ranked Coherent Solutions as the largest IT consulting firm in the Twin Cities, the fifth time it had topped the annual list in six years.

In June 2026, Coherent Solutions published a white paper on the use of artificial intelligence in fraud detection for financial services. The publication examined AI technologies, including machine learning, graph analytics, biometrics, and agentic systems.

== Services ==
Coherent Solutions provides custom software development, digital engineering, and technology consulting services. Its services include digital product engineering, artificial intelligence, data analytics, DevOps, mobile application development, and product design.
