= Michael A. Mallin =

American biologist

Michael A. Mallin is an American biologist. He is currently a Research Professor at University of North Carolina Wilmington and an Elected Fellow of the American Association for the Advancement of Science since 2007. His highest cited paper, Solution-phase synthesis of sub-10 nm Au− Ag alloy nanoparticles, has been cited 615 times, according to GoogleScholar. His current research interests are environmental and ocean management and pollution.

== Education ==
He earned his B.S. in botany at Ohio State University, his M.S. in Environmental Science at University of Florida in 1978 and his Ph.D. at University of North Carolina at Chapel Hill.

== Selected publications ==
- Mallin, M.A., M.I. Haltom, B. Song, M.E. Tavares and S.P. Dellies. 2010. Bacterial source tracking guides management of boat head waste in a coastal resort area. Journal of Environmental Management 91:2748-2753.
- Mallin, M.A., V.L. Johnson and S.H. Ensign. 2009. Comparative impacts of stormwater runoff on water quality of an urban, a suburban, and a rural stream. Environmental Monitoring and Assessment 159:475-491.
- Mallin, M.A. and C.A. Corbett. 2006. Multiple hurricanes and different coastal systems: How hurricane attributes determine the extent of environmental impacts. Estuaries and Coasts 29:1046-1061.
- Mallin, M.A., V.L. Johnson, S.H. Ensign and T.A. MacPherson. 2006. Factors contributing to hypoxia in rivers, lakes and streams. Limnology and Oceanography 51:690-701.
- Mallin, M.A., L.B. Cahoon and M.J. Durako. 2005. Contrasting food-web support bases for adjoining river-influenced and non-river influenced continental shelf ecosystems. Estuarine, Coastal and Shelf Science 62:55-62.
- Mallin, M.A., M.R. McIver, S.H. Ensign and L.B. Cahoon. 2004. Photosynthetic and heterotrophic impacts of nutrient loading to blackwater streams. Ecological Applications 14:823-838.
