= EverBlock Systems =

Construction material company

- Industry: Building Materials Manufacturing
- Founder: Arnon Rosan
- Website: www.everblocksystems.com

EverBlock Systems, LLC. is a modular construction materials company headquartered in Minneapolis, Minnesota. It is a subsidiary of Versare Systems, LLC. EverBlock develops and produces oversized building blocks, modular wall systems, and buildable furniture.

EverBlock is primarily known for its oversized polypropylene building blocks. The blocks are similar in structure and utility to the toy bricks manufactured by The Lego Group, although there is no official connection between the two. All EverBlocks are modular.

EverBlock was listed within the Forbes list "Survivors and Thrivers" in 2020, which referenced EverBlocks being used to build temporary hospitals and converting gymnasiums into socially distanced classrooms.

== Applications ==
EverBlocks can be assembled in various ways, including both children's play and professional, building-related applications. The company provides some templates which would allow the builders to create household furniture such as shelving units, tables, desks, catering stations, and bars. Some commercial applications have included using the blocks to construct interior building partitions, where larger spaces can be divided into multiple workspaces, cubicles, and entire offices. EverBlocks have also been recommended for dividing up smaller rooms, including studio apartments.

=== STEM Education ===
According to the EverBlock website, EverBlock has been used as part of STEM curriculums across the world, including at NASA's Space Camp.

=== Disaster Relief ===
EverBlocks have been used as a way to establish disaster relief shelters which can be quickly created and later dis-assembled for reuse in another location. In an interview with Wired Magazine, company founder Arnon Rosan stated "You could drop two pallets of these by helicopter and the next thing you know you have a solid, rigid structure."

=== Giant Menorah ===
In 2015, Ohev Sholom Congregation installed an oversized menorah in advance of Hanukkah. EverBlock built and installed the menorah.

== Ownership ==
EverBlock Systems is owned by Versare Solutions, LLC, a manufacturer of room dividers and cubicles. Versare Solutions purchased EverBlock Systems in November 2020. WILsquare Capital had previously acquired Versare in 2019.
