= Dan Mallin =

Dan Mallin is a Minnesota entrepreneur, Co-Founder and Managing Partner of Magnet 360 (sold to Mindtree 2016), co-founder of Lucy (sold to Capacity 2024) and today is a partner at Traction Capital. Co-Founder of The Minnesota Cup, Entrepreneur-in-Residence of the Gary S. Holmes Center for Entrepreneurship at the Carlson School of Management, and a Board Member of various organizations.

Mallin significantly contributed to his local community by helping develop and launch the Minnesota Military Appreciation Fund, which has awarded nearly 11 million USD in grants to support over 17,000 veterans’ families recipients.

== Career ==
Dan spent the early years of his career at 3M, as a Technologist Manager. In 1995, Mallin Co-founded Imaginet LLC. (sold to WPP plc), a consultancy providing internet-based solutions, with business partner Scott Litman. They sold the company to J. Walter Thompson in 2001, where Mallin then became the North American COO of the company.

Together, Mallin and Litman founded Spot Buy Spot in 1996, a company that developed IT services and Software to help media buyers manage inventory in the advertising industry. The company was eventually sold to Comcast in 2007.

In 2005, Mallin and Litman co-founded The Minnesota Cup. The competition was started to promote ground-breaking business ideas and is opened to all Minnesotans. Winning participants are awarded a share of over $5 million in cash prizes, opportunities to meet local investors and get exposure in the media. The intention of the Minnesota Cup is to promote the discovery and commercialization of innovative, entrepreneurial ideas in the state of Minnesota. Since its founding, it has become the largest statewide business plan competition in the United States. Over 20,000 Minnesotans have participated, with top finishers having raised nearly $1 billion in new capital.

Mallin has been recognized and awarded by multiple institutions, including multiple 3M awards, Ernst & Young’s Entrepreneur of the Year, Business Journal’s 40 Under 40, Twin Cities Business 200 People to Know, The Real Power 50 from Minnesota Business Magazine, and the Titans of Technology.

In September 2015, Mallin was a recipient of University of Minnesota's Outstanding Achievement Award. This award is given to University of Minnesota graduates who have attained exceptional distinction in their professional career or in public service, as well as demonstrated significant leadership on a community, state, national or international level.

In 2020, Mallin was honored as AASCB Influential Leader for lasting impact in their communities, industries, and around the world.

In 2024, Litman and Mallin sold Lucy to Capacity 2024

In 2025, Mallin was recognized as one of the "100 Minnesotans You Should Know."
