= Villa Pehuenia =

- Municipality and village
- Location within Neuquén Province Location within Argentina
- Coordinates: 38°53′06″S 71°10′11″W
- Country: Argentina
- Province: Neuquén Province
- Established: 20 January 1989
- Elevation: 3,816 ft (1,163 m)

Population (2010)
  - Total: 1,611
- Time zone: UTC−3 (ART)
- Climate: Csb

Villa Pehuenia is a village and municipality in Neuquén Province in southwestern Argentina. The town is located on the northern shore of Aluminé Lake and its economy is primarily based on tourism. The village is in the Andes and is located about 10 kilometres (6.2 mi) from the border with Chile via a highway through the Icalma pass. The town is named after the pehuén or monkey puzzle tree (Araucaria araucana), an endangered species found here at the southernmost limit of its range.

== History ==
The Mapuche people moved into this region from Chile in the 18th century, absorbing the earlier indigenous people and dominating the region until the late 19th century. Logging was the industry that first attracted settlers of European origin. The village of Villa Pehuenia was not created until 1989 with a population at that time of 155 people. The population had grown to 1,611 in 2010, the increase attributable to the increase in tourism. The indigenous Puel people (of Mapuche origin) continue to maintain a community here.

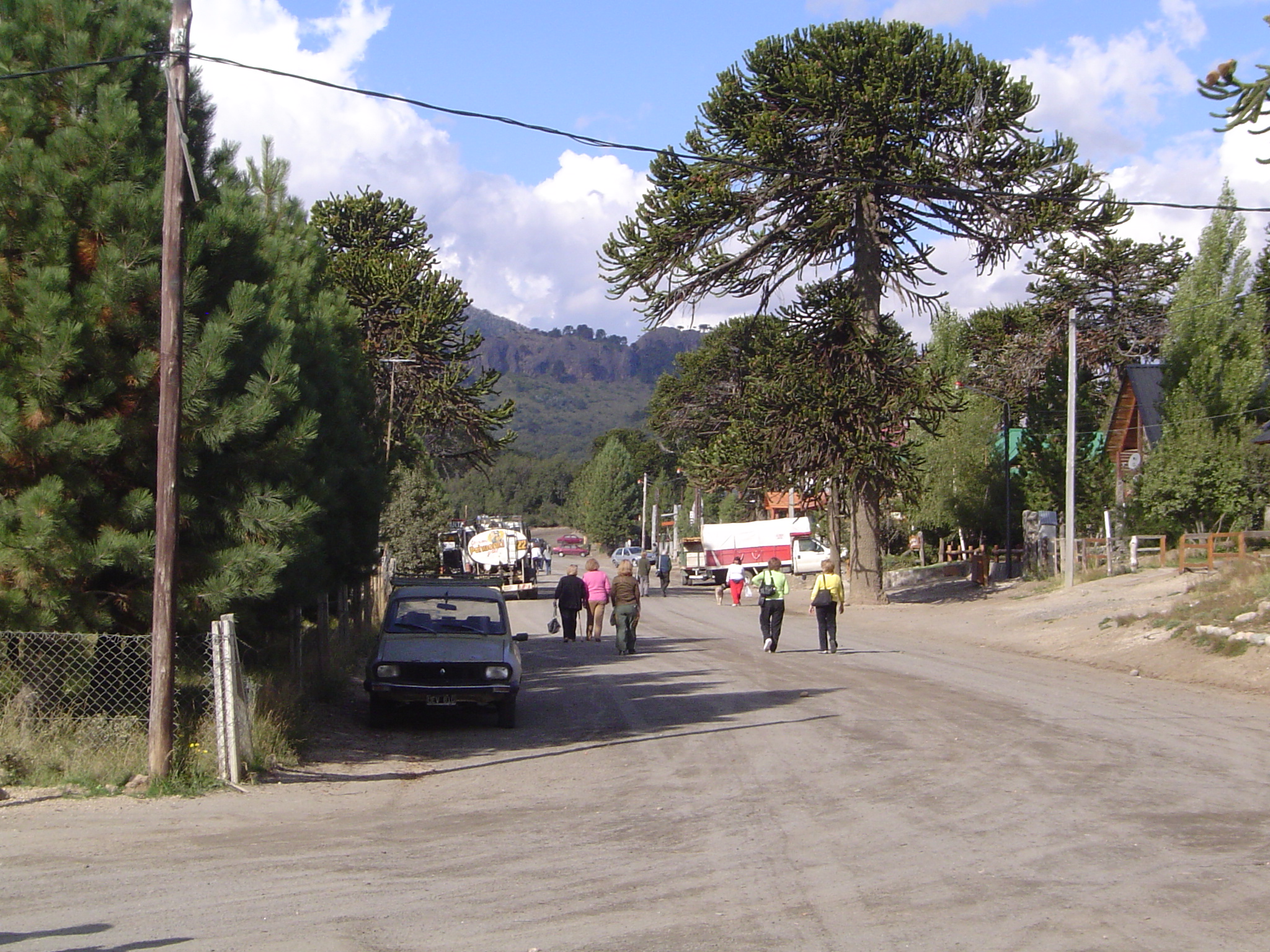
A street in Pehuenia and a Pehuen tree

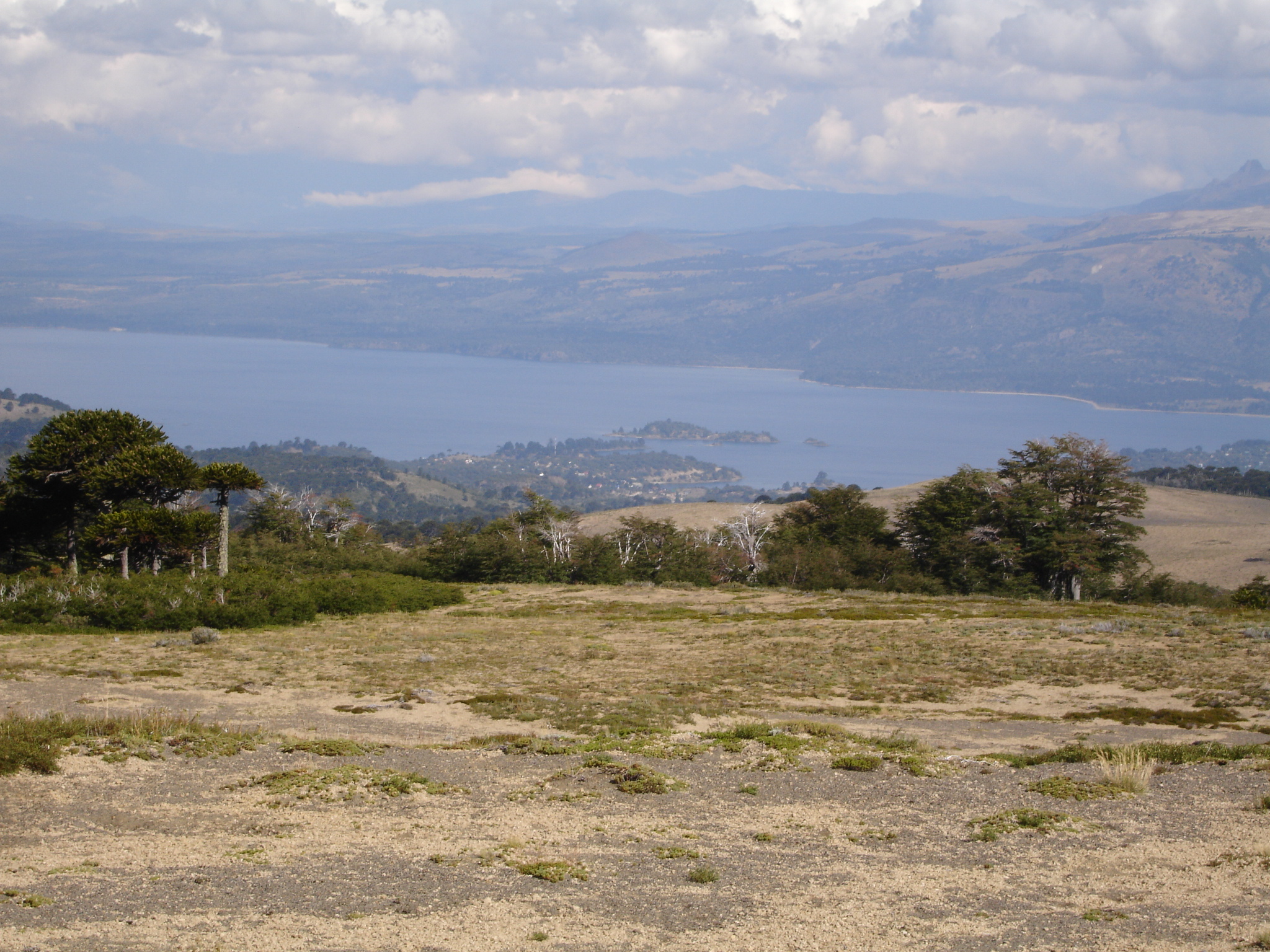
Lake Aluminé and Villa Pehuenia from the slopes of the Batea Mahuida volcano

== Description ==
Villa Pehuenia sprawls over about 5 kilometres (3.1 mi) of the northern shore of Lake Aluminé, but is concentrated on two narrow peninsulas extending out into the lake. Rising near the village is the Batea Mahuida volcano which reaches a maximum elevation of 1,948 metres (6,391 ft) about 8 kilometres (5.0 mi) north of the Villa Pehuenia. A small ski resort is operated on the slopes of the volcano by the Puel people.

== Climate ==
Villa Pehuenia has a warm-summer mediterranean climate, Csb in the Köppen climate classification system and Crlk (mild summers, cool winters) in the Trewartha climate classification.

Climate data for Villa Pehuenia 1,163 metres (3,816 ft) above sea level
| Month | Jan | Feb | Mar | Apr | May | Jun | Jul | Aug | Sep | Oct | Nov | Dec | Year |
|---|---|---|---|---|---|---|---|---|---|---|---|---|---|
| Mean daily maximum °C (°F) | 24.4 (75.9) | 24.0 (75.2) | 21.4 (70.5) | 16.9 (62.4) | 11.4 (52.5) | 6.7 (44.1) | 6.8 (44.2) | 8.9 (48.0) | 12.4 (54.3) | 16.7 (62.1) | 19.7 (67.5) | 22.0 (71.6) | 16.0 (60.8) |
| Daily mean °C (°F) | 14.8 (58.6) | 14.3 (57.7) | 12.1 (53.8) | 8.7 (47.7) | 5.7 (42.3) | 3.3 (37.9) | 3.7 (38.7) | 4.5 (40.1) | 6.0 (42.8) | 8.6 (47.5) | 11.1 (52.0) | 13.2 (55.8) | 8.8 (47.8) |
| Mean daily minimum °C (°F) | 5.2 (41.4) | 4.6 (40.3) | 2.9 (37.2) | 0.5 (32.9) | 0 (32) | 0 (32) | 0.6 (33.1) | 0.1 (32.2) | −0.4 (31.3) | 0.5 (32.9) | 2.8 (37.0) | 4.5 (40.1) | 1.6 (34.9) |
| Average precipitation mm (inches) | 23 (0.9) | 29 (1.1) | 53 (2.1) | 74 (2.9) | 164 (6.5) | 195 (7.7) | 183 (7.2) | 132 (5.2) | 80 (3.1) | 45 (1.8) | 49 (1.9) | 36 (1.4) | 1,063 (41.9) |
