= Mallín =

Type of meadow and wetland in Patagonia

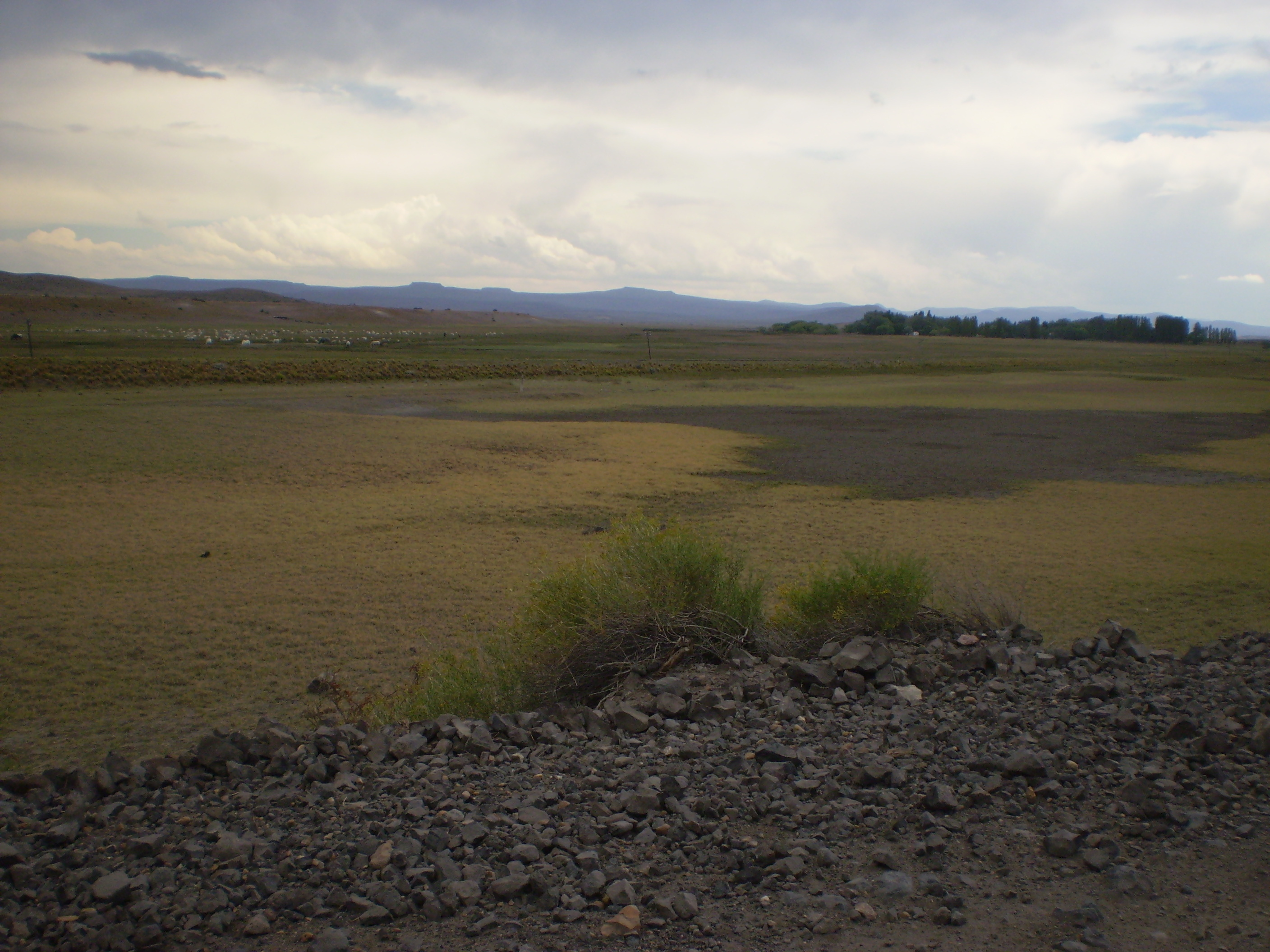
A mallín near Ingeniero Jacobacci, a railroad infill traverses it.

Mallín is a type of meadow and wetland found in southern Chile and Argentina. Mallines are distinguished from other wetlands in that the groundwater level reaches the surface at them, yet the mallín is still an area of net infiltration. Soils in mallines are rich in organic matter. In Argentina mallins have been important grazing lands for cattle, sheep and horses. In eastern Patagonia the base of basaltic plateaus are associated with mallines.

== See also ==
- Bofedal
- Ñadi
