= Tennant Company =

American cleaning products company

- Type: Public
- Traded as: NYSE: TNC; S&P 600 component
- Industry: Manufacturing
- Founded: 1870
- Founder: George H. Tennant
- Headquarters: Eden Prairie, Minnesota, USA
- Area served: worldwide
- Key people: Dave Huml (CEO)
- Products: cleaning machines
- Brands: Tennant, IPC, Nobles, Alfa
- Revenue: $1.2 billion (2025FY)
- Website: tennantco.com

The Tennant Company (TNC:NYQ) is a company with about 4500 employees that provides cleaning products. Headquartered in Eden Prairie, Minnesota, it is listed on the New York Stock Exchange.

== Background ==
Tennant's products are used to clean and coat surfaces. The Company operates through the following operating segments: North America, Latin America, Europe, Middle East, Africa, and Asia Pacific.

The company was founded in Minneapolis by George H. Tennant as a wood-working business in 1870. It was incorporated in 1909.

Tennant is a leading global manufacturer of floor maintenance and cleaning equipment.

In 2017, Tennant announced the acquisition of IPC Group, a company based in Italy manufacturing Scrubber Dryers, Sweepers, Vacuum Cleaners, High Pressure Washers.

In, 2018, Tennant launched their first fully-autonomous scrubber powered by the Brain Corp. AI Operating System.

As of May, 2023, the Tennant Company is one of the world's largest manufacturer's of autonomous mobile robots with over 6,000 units deployed across the world.
