= Conservis =

Conservis LLC
- Industry: Agriculture, IT
- Founded: 2009; 17 years ago
- Headquarters: Minneapolis, Minnesota, US
- Key people: Pat Christie (President); Aneetha Gopalan (COO); Chuck Faison (VP Product Development)
- Owner: Independent(2009-21); Rabobank (2021-23); Telus (2021-23); Traction Ag, Inc.(2023-present)
- Website: conservis.ag

Conservis LLC is a Minneapolis-based company that provides enterprise resource planning software to farmers.

== History ==
The company was founded in 2009 when four farmers asked Pat Christie and Eric Jackson for help with workflow management. Prior to this, it was planning to enter the energy enterprise software and emissions trading sector but decided not to enter it due to the American Clean Energy and Security Act of 2009 failing to pass in the US Congress.

In July 2021, the American Software as a Service (SaaS) company was acquired by a joint venture formed by the Dutch bank Rabobank and the Canadian telecommunications company Telus. Then, in December 2023 it was purchased by the American agricultural firm Traction Ag, Inc.

== Business ==
Conservis has collaborated with Iteris to provide weather data and analytics to farmers.
