= Caburgua-Huelemolle =

Mountain in Chile

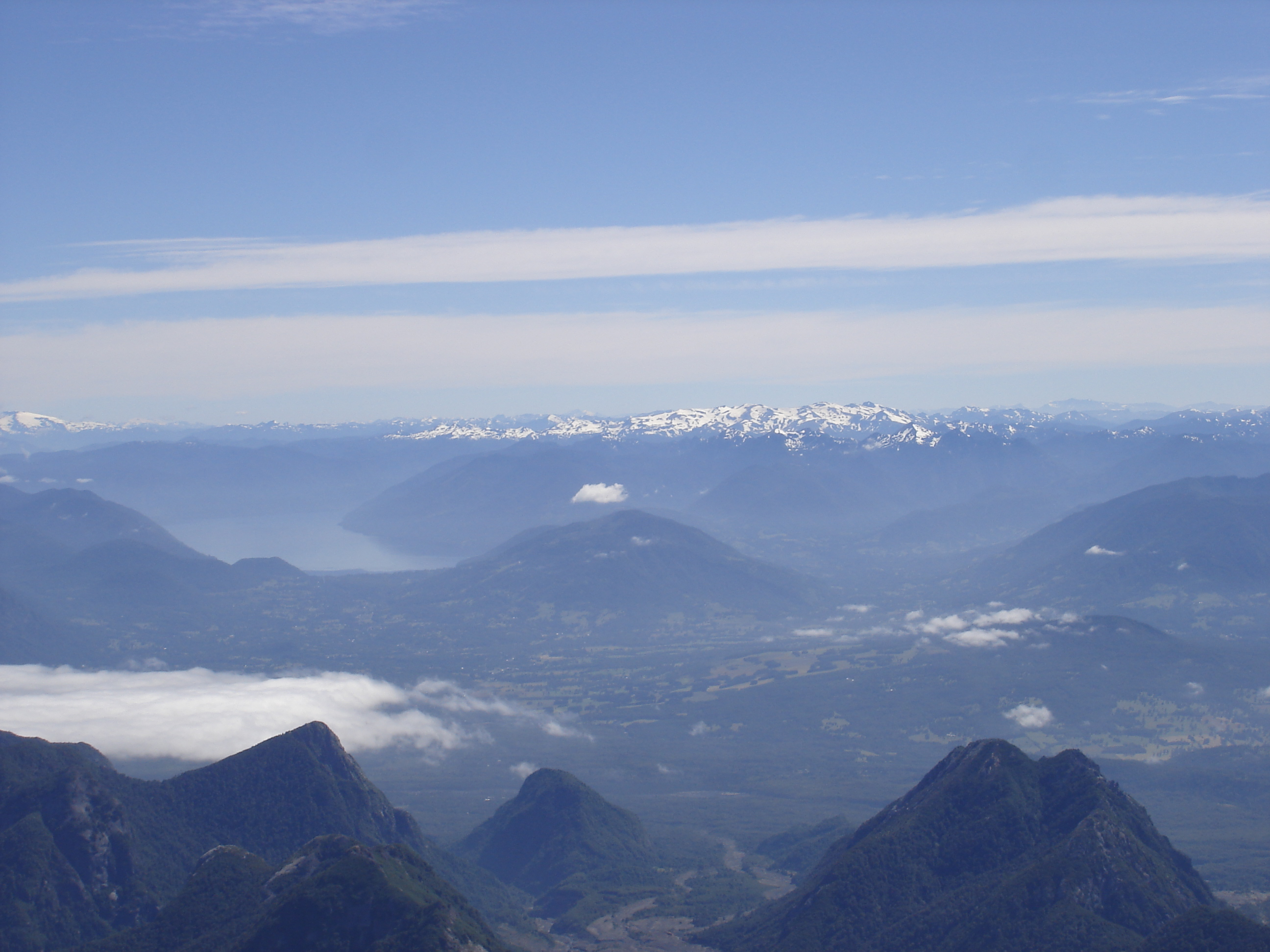
- Some of the cinder cones are visible in the middle distance. The ice-capped Nevados de Sollipulli in the distance as seen from Villarrica Volcano. Also visible in the image is Caburgua Lake.

Highest point
- Elevation: 1,496 m (4,908 ft)
- Coordinates: 39°15′0″S 71°42′0″W

Geography
- Location: Chile
- Parent range: Andes

Geology
- Mountain type: Volcanic field
- Last eruption: 5050 BC ± 1000 years

Caburgua-Huelemolle consists of four groups of cinder cones, namely they are Volcanes de Caburgua, Volcán Huelemolle, Volcán Redondo and Pichares. Volcanes de Caburgua is a group formed by six pyroclastic cones located at the southern tip of the Caburgua Lake, which is a lava-dammed lake created by volcanic activity from the just mentioned cones. Volcán Huelemolle is a group of three cinder cones lying between the rivers Liucura and Trancura.

== See also ==
- List of volcanoes in Chile
