= Pucón =

City in Araucanía, Chile

- City and commune
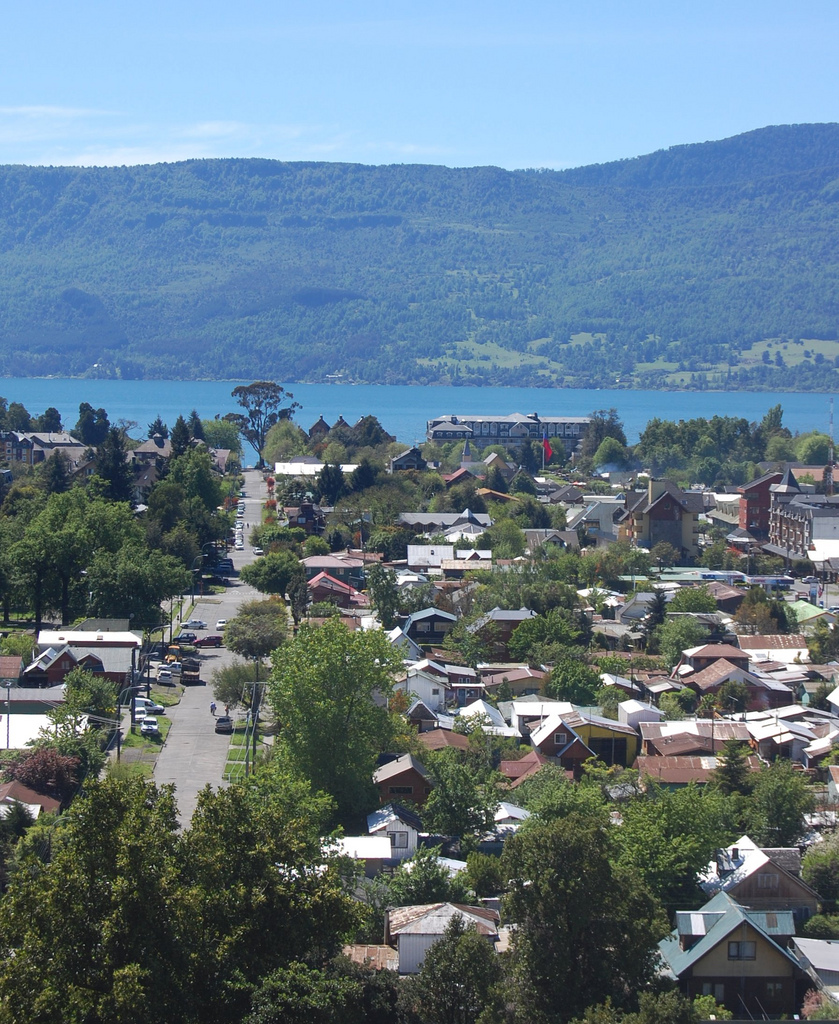
- View of Pucón along Lincoyán street and Villarrica Lake

- Flag Coat of arms Map of Pucón commune in the Araucanía Region Location in Chile
- Coordinates: 39°16′36″S 71°58′28″W
- Country: Chile
- Region: Araucanía
- Province: Cautín
- Foundation: February 27, 1883

Government
  - Type: Municipality
  - Mayor: Sebastián Álvarez (EVO)

Area
  - City and commune: 1,248.5 km^{2} (482.0 sq mi)
- Elevation: 227 m (745 ft)

Population (2012 Census)
  - City and commune: 22,081
  - Density: 17.686/km^{2} (45.807/sq mi)
  - Urban: 13,837
  - Rural: 7,270

Sex
  - Men: 10,705
  - Women: 10,402
- Time zone: UTC−4 (CLT)
  - Summer (DST): UTC−3 (CLST)
- Area code: country 56 + city 45
- Website: www.municipalidadpucon.cl (in Spanish)

Pucón (Mapudungun: "entrance to the cordillera") is a Chilean city and commune administered by the municipality of Pucón. It is located in the Province of Cautín, Araucanía Region, 100 km to the southeast of Temuco and 780 km to the south of Santiago. It is on the eastern shore of Lake Villarrica, and Villarrica volcano is located roughly 17 km to the south.

Pucón's location by a lake and volcano, along with its relatively stable climate, especially in summer, make it a popular destination for tourists. It offers a variety of sports and activities for tourists, including water skiing, snow skiing, backpacking, white water rafting and kayaking, horse back riding, natural hot springs, zip line rides, skydiving and guided ascents of Villarrica volcano.

== History ==
During the conquest of Chile the Spanish founded the city of Villarrica in 1552 in the area of what is now Pucón. The Spanish carried out significant mining of gold in placer deposits around this city. However at some point in the 16th century it is presumed the gold placers were buried by lahars flowing down from nearby Villarrica Volcano. This prompted settlers to relocate the city further west at its modern location, abandoning this the site of Pucón.

The modern settlement of Pucón was established in 1883 as a fort in the aftermath of the Occupation of Araucanía when the Chilean state subdued the native population of Araucanía Region. It was a strategically advantageous spot because of its location at entrance of the Trancura Valley, where the Argentinean army had once pursued a group of Mapuches through Mamuil Malal Pass during the Conquest of the Desert.

The first hotel in Pucón was the Gudenschwager, established in 1923, but it was in 1934 with the establishment of Gran Hotel Pucón that tourism became a popular activity in the area. In 1940 the first road between Villarrica and Pucón was built and in the 1970s the road to Caburgua Lake was finished.

== Climate ==
According to the Köppen climate classification, Pucón has an oceanic climate (Cfb). In summer, it reaches between 22°C and 25°C, rarely reaching above 30°C. While in winter, the temperature typically reaches between 2°C and 4°C.

== Demographics ==
Historical population
Year	Pop.	±% p.a.
1895	1,454	—
1907	3,508	+7.62%
1920	5,959	+4.16%
1930	8,937	+4.14%
1940	14,901	+5.25%
1952	17,197	+1.20%
1970	10,623	−2.64%
1982	12,589	+1.43%
1992	14,356	+1.32%
2002	21,107	+3.93%
2017	28,523	+2.03%
2024	32,321	+1.80%
Source: "Censo de Población y Vivienda". National Statistics Institute.

According to the 2002 census carried out by the Chilean National Statistics Institute, Pucón spans an area of 1,248.5 km^{2} (482 sq mi) and has 21,107 inhabitants (10,705 men and 10,402 women). Of these, 13,837 (65.6%) lived in urban areas and 7,270 (34.4%) in rural areas. The population grew by 47% (6,751 persons) between the 1992 and 2002 censuses.

== Tourism ==
Pucón is a major center of adventure tourism in Chile, attracting national and foreigner visitors alike. Due to its striking natural surroundings which include volcanoes, lakes, waterfalls, nature reserves and hot springs, Pucón attracts tourism all year round.During the summer, popular tourist activities include hiking, rafting, horseback riding, bird watching, fishing, canopy trails, and canyoning. In winter and spring, it is possible to go skiing or snowboarding on the slopes of Villarrica volcano or visit one of the several thermal baths scattered around the nearby Valdivian temperate rain forest. These activities are easily arranged from the city itself, which harbours several tourist offices and travel agencies.

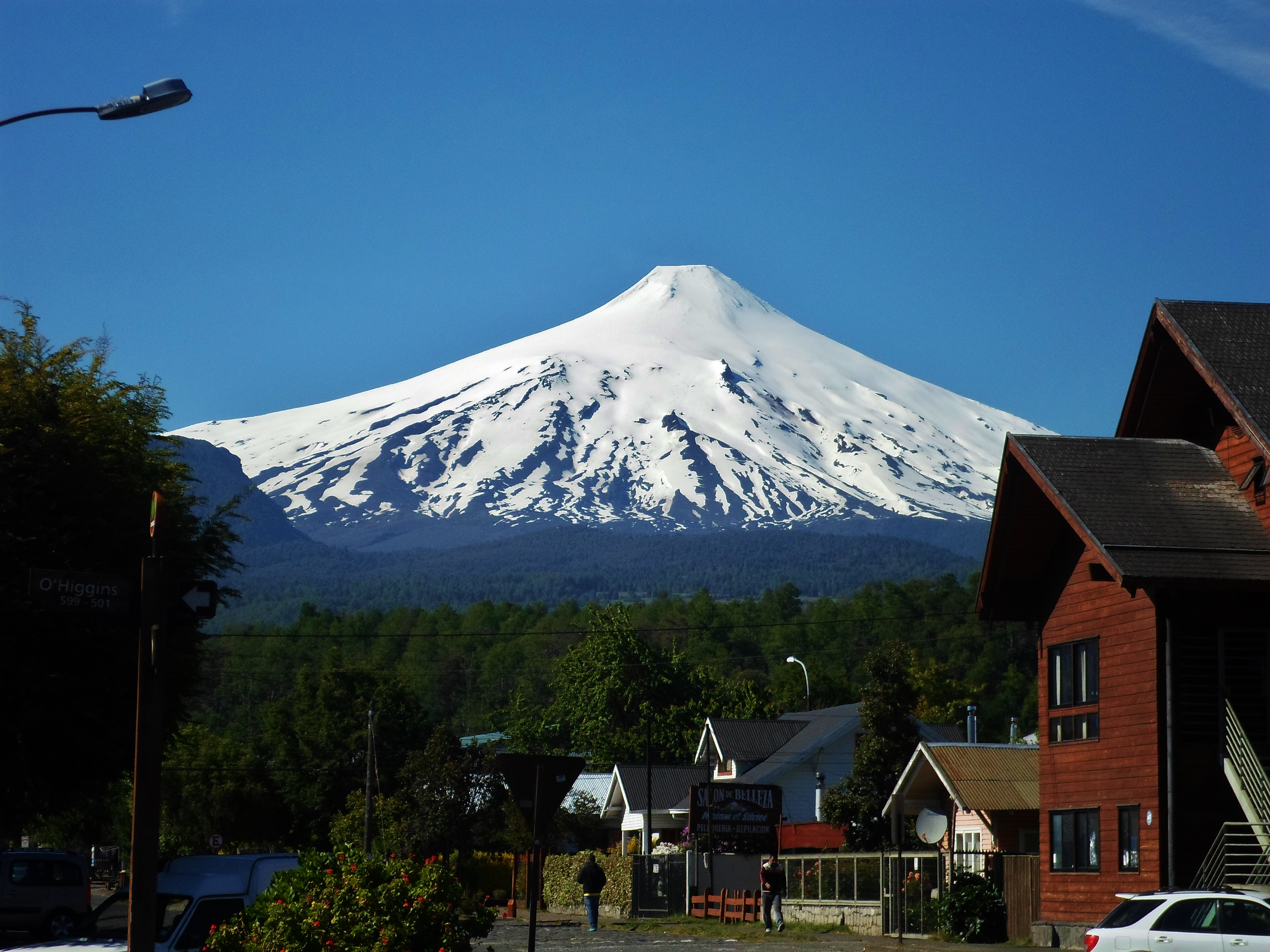
Villarrica volcano as seen from a main Pucón street

Despite its relatively small urban area, accommodation infrastructure in Pucón is well developed, ranging from backpacker hostels to luxury hotels. Chilean and international cuisine can be found in one of the town's several restaurants and cafes. More recently, Pucón has become a major destination for second home investments and amenity migration.

Volcano and Lake Villarrica in Pucón.

=== Tourist attractions ===
Villarrica is the closest volcano to Pucón and is frequently climbed from the town. Other volcanoes in the area include Mocho-Choshuenco, Quetrupillán and Lanín. Villarrica has had more than 82 eruptions since 1558, the most recent of which occurred on March 3, 2015. It is possible to climb it throughout the year, if weather and volcanic activity permit. During winter, the summit is completely covered by snow, and offers views of at least seven of the surrounding lakes.

El Cañi, meaning “sight that transforms”, is a private protected area of 500 hectares belonging to a non-profit organization. It contains hiking trails through ancient araucarias, lengas, coigues, old volcanic craters and lagoons. It is administered by a group of farmers. The park is home to foxes, pumas, pudús (a small kind of deer), wild ducks and condors, among many other species. A view point located at 1,550 meters altitude provides views of four nearby volcanoes: Villarrica, Quetrupillán, Lanín and Llaima.

National parks in the area include Villarrica National Park, Huerquehue National Park and Villarrica National Reserve. Some of the main lakes near Pucón are Villarrica, Caburgua and Tinquilco. The main river is the Trancura, which is used for kayaking and rafting. There are different levels of difficulty on the river, from easy family rides through Level III rapids to more difficult rides through Level V rapids.

There are several hot springs and spas in the commune of Pucón and the surrounding area, including: Palguín, Rio Blanco, Huife, Quimey-Co and Los Pozones. The nearby commune of Curarrehue also contains popular spas, including: Menetúe, San Luis, Trancura, Panqui and Ancamil.

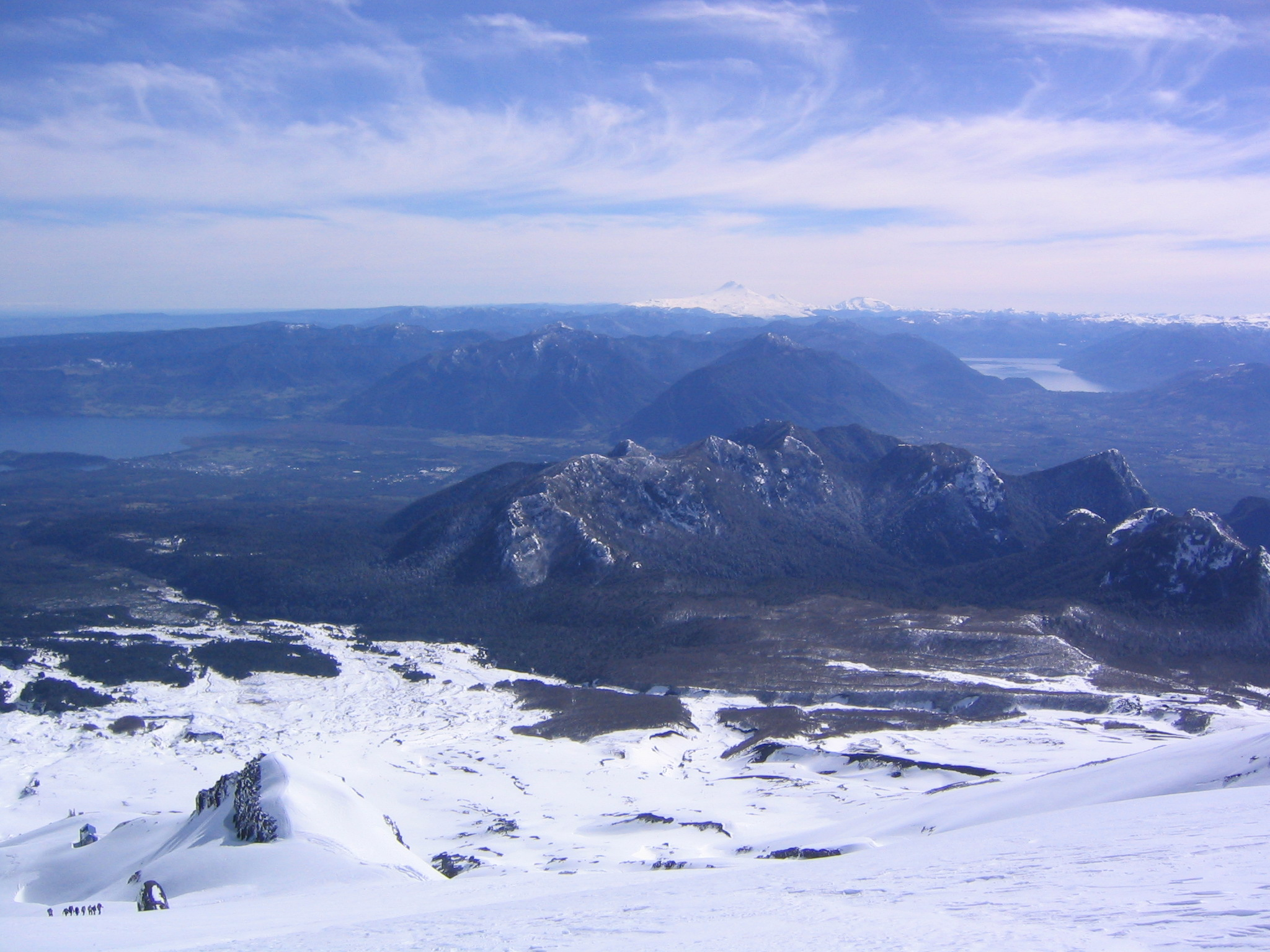
Pucón is visible in the left center of the image. Llaima can be seen in the distance.

== Lahar risk zones ==
Volcanic mudflows known as lahars are common in the history of Pucón and the vicinity of Villarrica volcano. In 1964, a lahar destroyed much of the woodlogging town of Coñaripe. A 2014 study determined that the international road just east of the Pucón Airport lies in a zone of high danger, as does the road connecting to the west with the town of Villarrica. The airport is in a low danger zone, while most of the urbanized area of the city was outside the possible paths for lahars.

== Administration ==
As a commune, Pucón is a third-level administrative division of Chile administered by a municipal council, headed by a mayor who is directly elected every four years. The 2024–2028 mayor is Sebastián Álvarez (EVO), while the councilors are the following:

- Claudio Cortez (RN)
- Emilio Ulloa (RN)
- Armin Avilés (Ind./UDI)
- Julio Inzunza (PDG)
- Marina Matus (REP)
- Verónica Castillo (FA)

Within the electoral divisions of Chile, Pucón is represented in the Chamber of Deputies by René Manuel García (National Renewal) and Fernando Meza (Social Democrat Radical Party) as part of the 52nd electoral district (together with Cunco, Curarrehue, Villarrica, Loncoche, Gorbea and Toltén). The commune is represented in the Senate by José Garcia Ruminot (National Renewal) and Eugenio Tuma Zedan (PPD) as part of the 15th senatorial constituency (Araucanía-South).

== Education ==
Previously the area had a German school, Deutsche Schule Pucón.

== Transportation ==
The main road to access Pucón is Chile Route 199, which begins in Freire at the intersection of the highway Ruta de la Araucanía, a section of Chile Route 5. With respect to intercity public transit, there are bus terminals with daily service to Temuco, Villarica, Cunco, Concepción, and Santiago, with additional stops along the way. The city is also served by Pucón Airport, which can handle aircraft up to the size of a Boeing 737 jet.

== Notable people ==
- Francisco Valdés Subercaseaux (1902-1982): Capuchin Prelate and first Bishop of the Diocese of Osorno.
- Gloria Dünkler (1977-): poet and narrator.

== See also ==
- Villarrica Lake
- Villarrica (volcano)
- Quetrupillán Volcano
- Lanín and Llaima Volcanos

== Sister cities ==
- Lake Oswego, Oregon, United States
- Veneto, Italy
- San Martín de los Andes, Argentina
