= Chile Route 199 =

Highway in Chile

Route 199
- Ruta 199
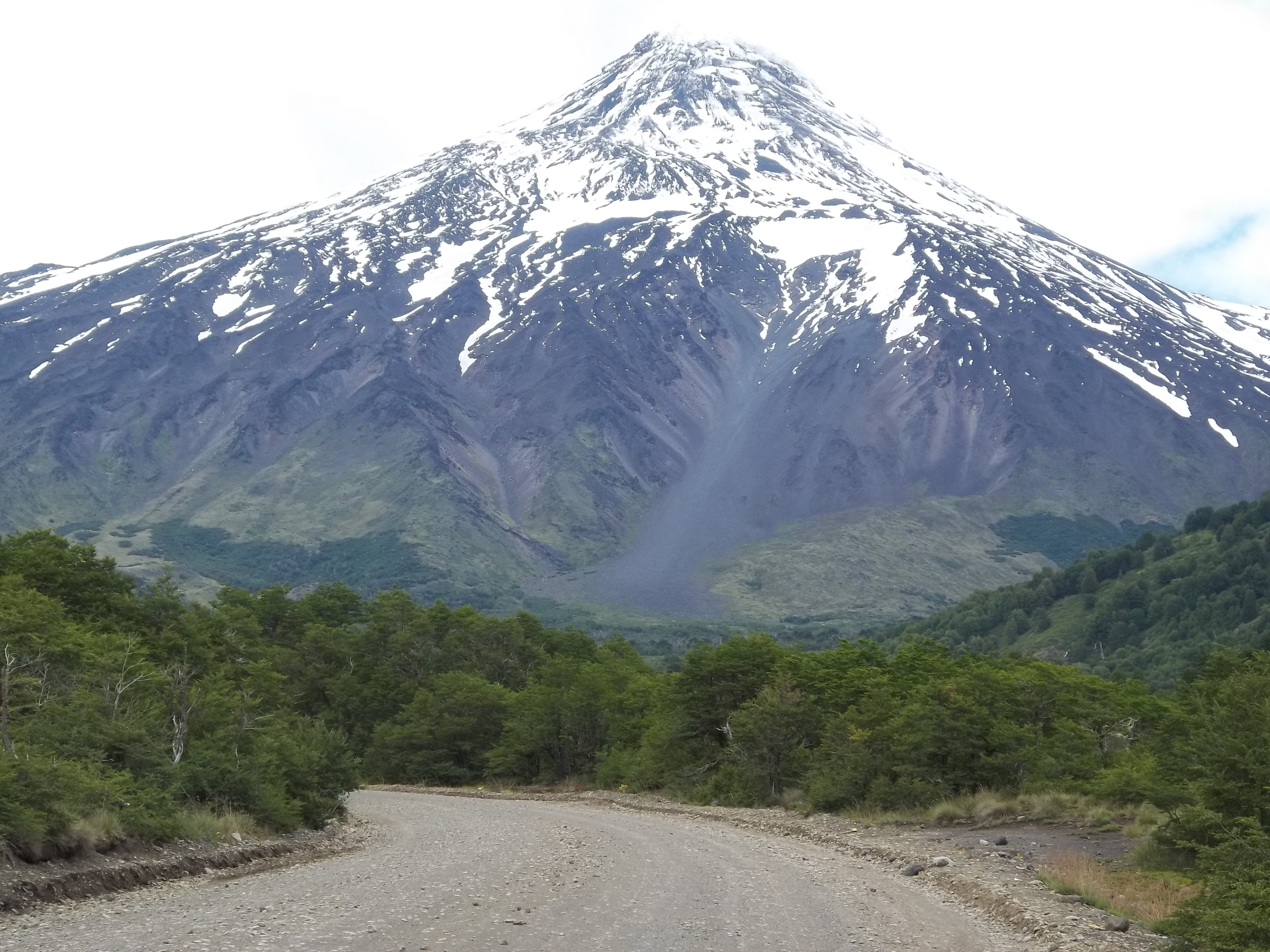
- Route 199-CH next to Lanín volcano near the Chile-Argentina border.

Location
- Country: Chile

Highway system
- Highways in Chile

Route 199-CH is a branch line road going eastward from Chile Highway 5 near Freire to Mamuil Malal Pass at the border to Argentina. Through its length the road passes along the cities and towns of Villarrica, Pucón and Curarrehue, between the first two cities the road runs along Villarrica Lake following the foothills of Villarrica volcano. East of Pucón the road follows Trancura Valley, passing by Curarrehue, until Mamuil Malal Pass just north of Lanín volcano. In the section south of Curarrehue and before the turn eastwards the road follows the Reigolil-Pirihueico Fault.

== Gallery ==
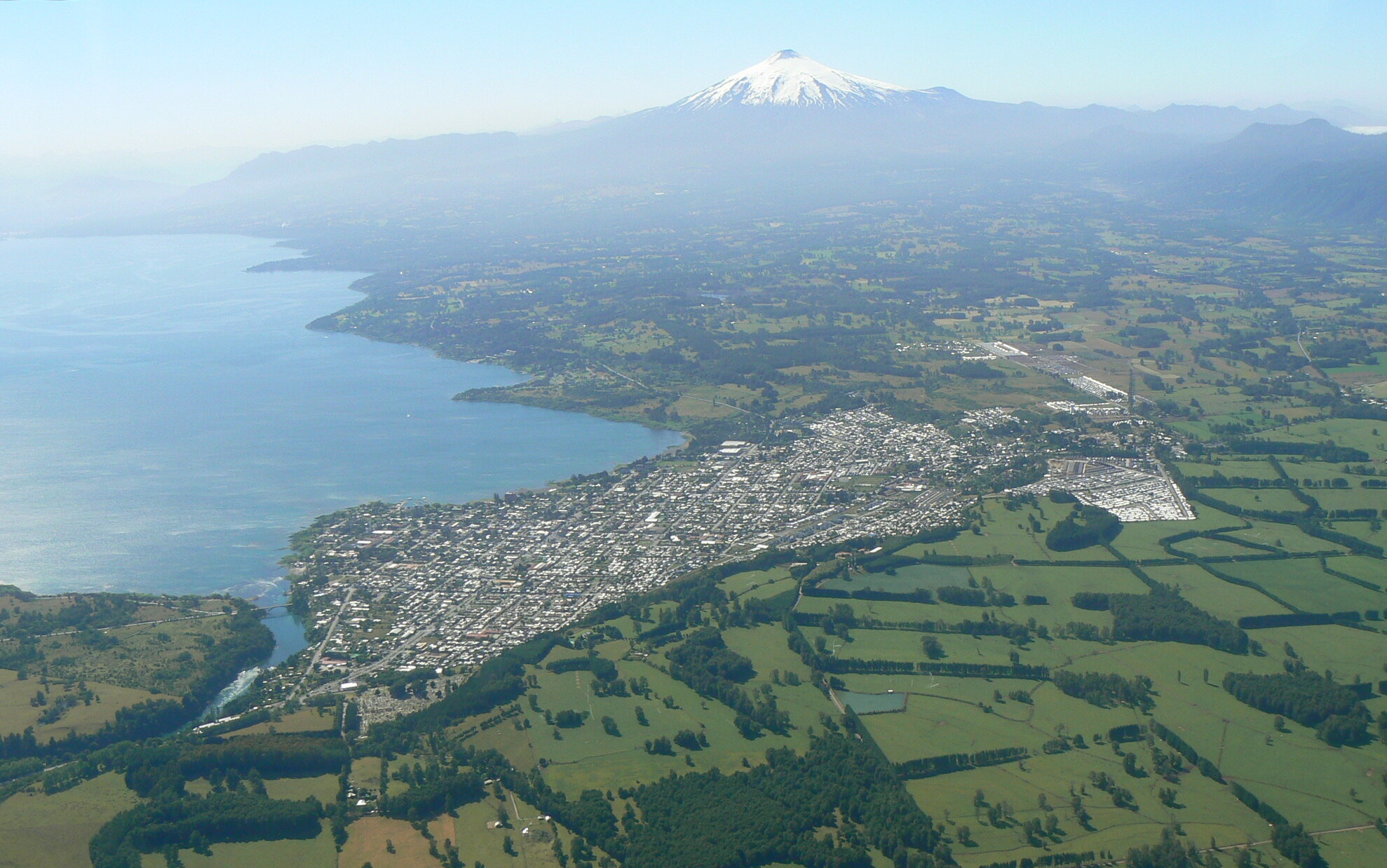
Route 199-CH runs across the city of Villarrica and goes then eastward (up in the photo) along Villarrica Lake

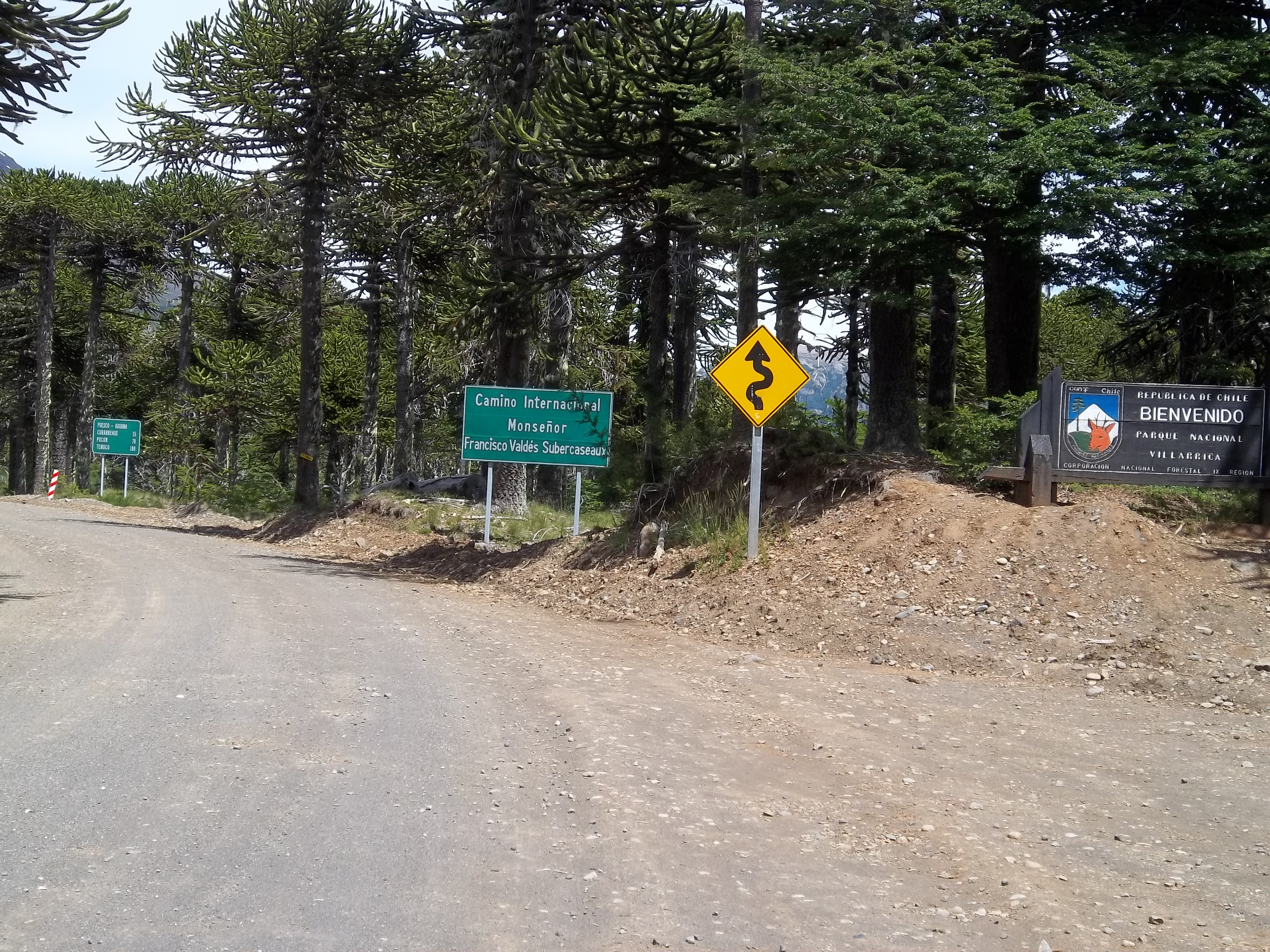
The route at an Araucaria araucana forest in Mamuil Malal Pass
