= Pucón Airport =

Airport in Chile

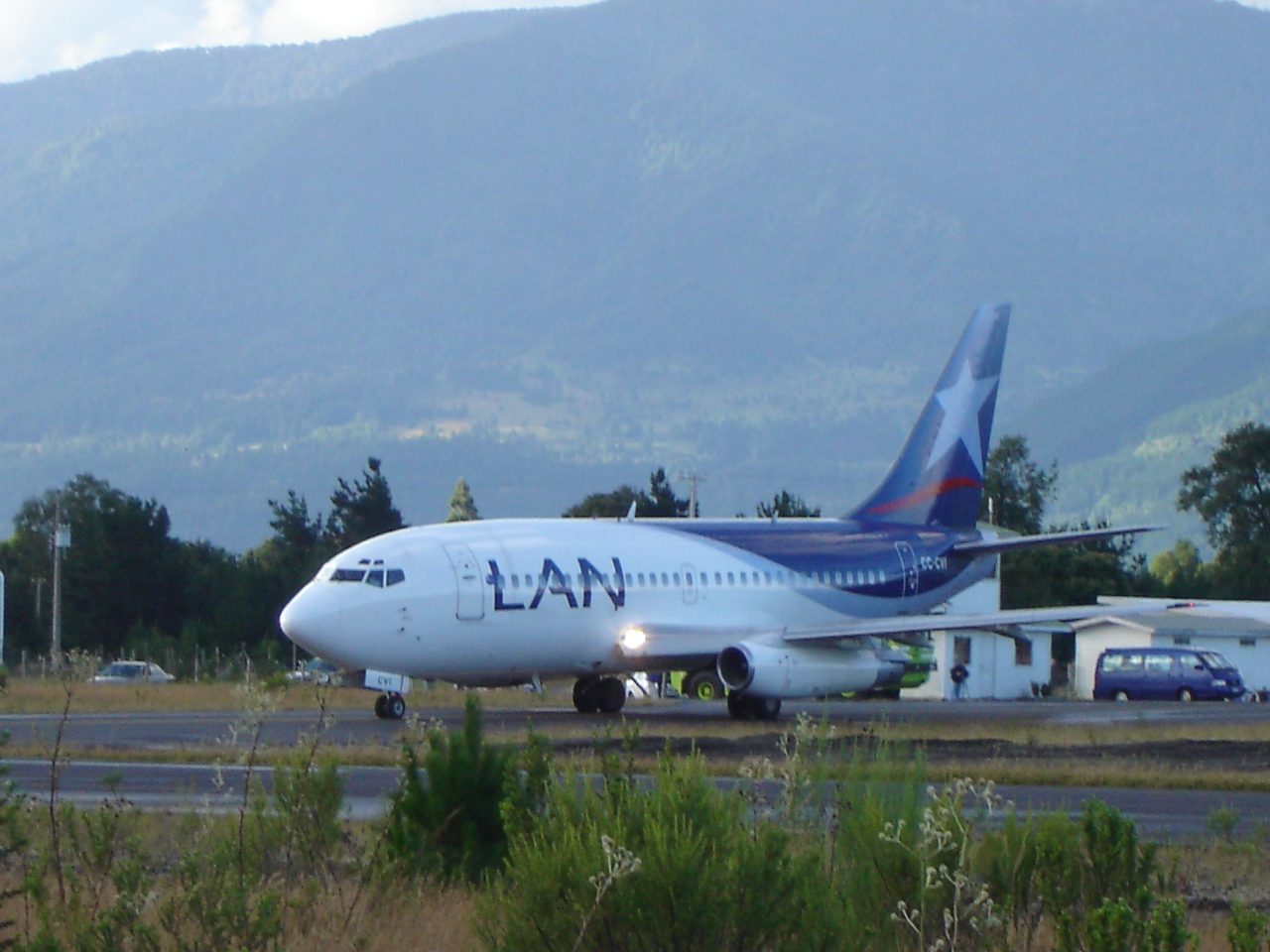
- LAN airplane leaving Pucón (2006).
- IATA: ZPC; ICAO: SCPC

Summary
- Airport type: Public
- Owner: Chilean State
- Operator: Lan Airlines and Sky Airlines
- Serves: Pucón, Chile
- Location: Region de la Araucania
- Elevation AMSL: 879 ft / 268 m
- Coordinates: 39°17′29″S 71°55′15″W

Map
- Location of airport in Chile

Runways
Direction	Length		Surface
Direction	m	ft	Surface
09/27	1,700	5,577	Asphalt
- Sources: WAD GCM

Pucón Airport (Spanish: Aeropuerto Pucón, IATA: ZPC, ICAO: SCPC) is an airport 5 kilometres (3.1 mi) east of Pucón, a city on the eastern shore of Villarrica Lake in the Araucanía Region of Chile.

The airport can handle aircraft up to the Boeing 737 in size and operates seasonal flights from Santiago de Chile. Travel options vary between high and low tourist season.

There is mountainous terrain north and south of the runway.

== See also ==
- Transport in Chile
- List of airports in Chile
