= Caburgua Lake =

Lake of Chile

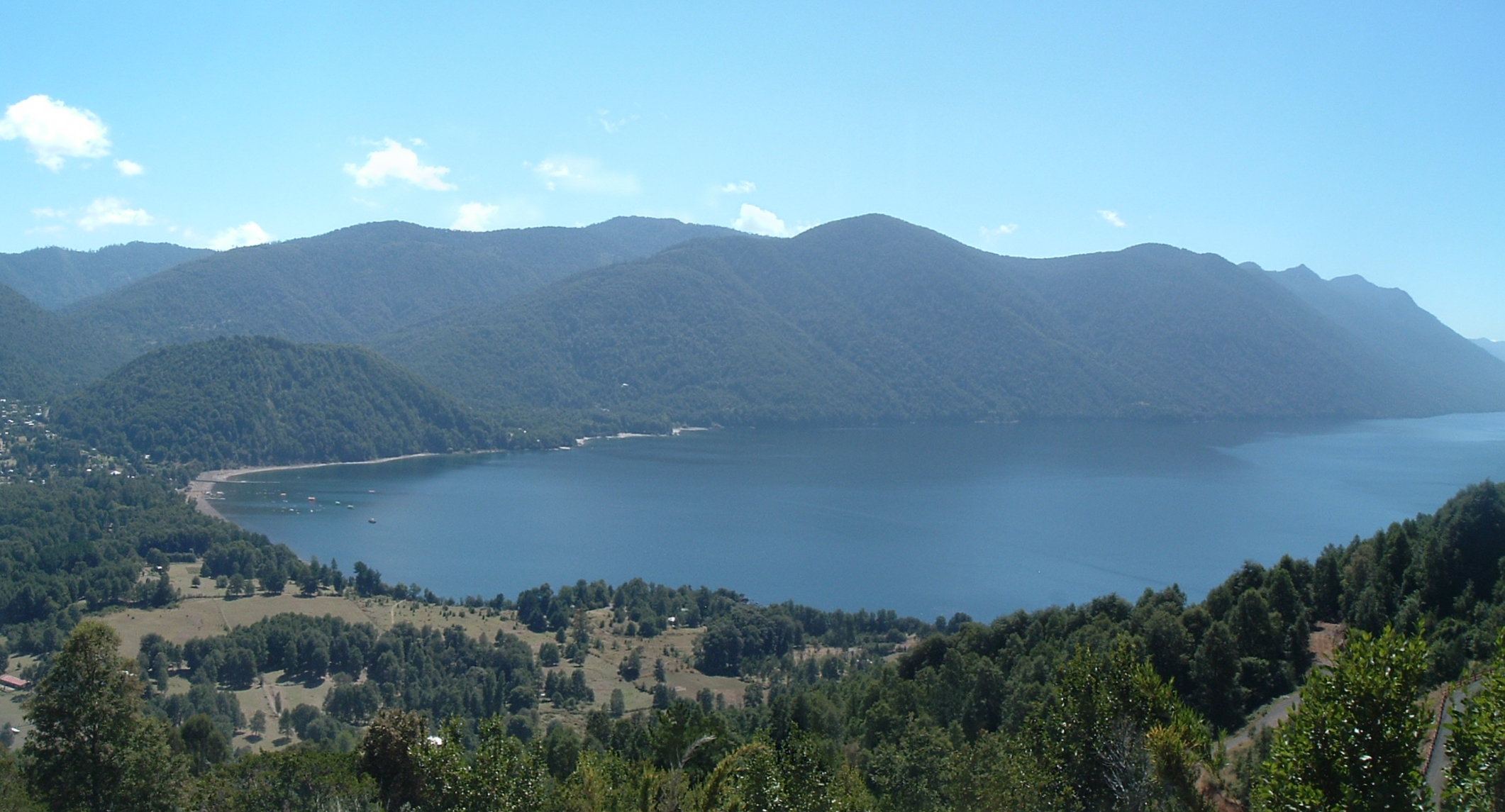

- Location within Chile

- Caburga, the northernmost in the map
- Location: Cautín Province
- Coordinates: 39°07′40″S 71°46′24″W
- Type: Fault, glacial and lava dammed
- Primary inflows: Blanco River
- Primary outflows: Ojos del Caburgua (an underground outflow)
- Catchment area: 325 km^{2} (125 sq mi)
- Basin countries: Chile
- Max. length: 19 km (12 mi)
- Max. width: 5 km (3.1 mi)
- Surface area: 52.27 km^{2} (20.18 sq mi)
- Average depth: 117 m (384 ft)
- Max. depth: 327 m (1,073 ft)
- Water volume: 6.115 km^{3} (1.467 cu mi)
- Shore length^{1}: 51.7 km (32.1 mi)
- Surface elevation: 505 m (1,657 ft)
- Settlements: Playa Negra
- ^{1} Shore length is not a well-defined measure.

Caburgua Lake (Spanish pronunciation: [kaˈβuɾɣwa]) is located 23 kilometres (14 mi) northeast of the city of Pucón, in the La Araucanía Region of Chile. Huerquehue National Park lies to the east of the lake. Like Villarrica Lake, it is part of Toltén River basin. During summer the outflow river may dry out but due to high levels of underground infiltration the waterfalls Ojos del Caburgua never run dry.

The lake occupies a glacial valley carved out along the Liquiñe-Ofqui Fault. In the Holocene the valley was blocked by lava flows from the Volcanes de Caburgua.

The lake has recently gained notoriety for the holiday residences of people like former Presidents Sebastián Piñera and Michelle Bachelet.

== History ==
The earliest Caburgua inhabitants before the Spanish were the Pehuenche, a subdivision of the Mapuche, who lived in the southern Andes and moved back and forth across the mountains. Numerous descendants of these people live in Caburgua today. Local residents do not usually distinguish Mapuche subdivisions, rather, they call Mapuche all the people who still speak the native language and have Mapuche surnames. The forests where the Mapuche lived stretched from the Pacific coast to the Argentine pampas. They were ancient and very productive. The most important tree was the Pehuén, referred to today as the Pino Araucaria, which produces large quantities of pine nuts. In the fall when the nuts mature, locals climb to the Pehuén forests, usually located above 1,000 metres (3,300 ft), and collect the pine nuts or piñones in sacks. The Mapuche have various ways to consume the nuts: roasted, ground into flour, boiled, or in a fermented cider. The nuts are still consumed in large quantities and are seasonally available in Pucón grocery stores.

Taking advantage of natural meadows, the Mapuche planted corn, potatoes, and other vegetables. They also used slash and burn agriculture, but most of the Andes in this region were covered by giant, noble hardwoods, like coihue, roble, and raulí, which were not easy to clear for farming. The Mapuche did burn the trees and make dugout canoes, but without iron tools they could not make lumber. When the Spanish conquered the forested regions, they likewise had trouble developing a lumber industry for lack of machines and transportation.

In spite of Caburgua's isolation, it is part of Chile's fascinating history. In the 16th century when the Spanish first settled in Chile, they quickly founded Santiago in 1541, Concepcion in 1550, and Villarrica in 1552. During the latter's first decade, the Mapuche rebelled and destroyed the settlement, but the Spanish rebuilt it. In 1603, however, a Mapuche rebellion forced the Spanish to abandon Villarrica and many other communities. For almost three centuries these towns disappeared. Not until the construction of the railroad in Southern Chile in the 1880s was Villarrica reestablished. Three years later, in 1883 Chilean government established the first fort at Pucón.

In the early 20th century large land grants, logging, and homesteading moved east from Pucón up the valley toward Argentina. Although a number of sizable estates were formed in this region, due to poor soils of volcanic sands, as well as numerous lava deposits in the Caburgua Valley, this area remained unattractive to large farms and ranches. As a result, those who forged the early Caburgua community were Mapuche inhabitants who had signed land cession treaties, Chilean campesinos, and German immigrants. Ironically, a number of Chilean settlers had lived some years in Argentina. Don Segundo Luengo, for example, was born in southern Chile (Angol), then crossed to Argentina where he drove cattle with his father throughout the southern pampas. As a young adult, he returned to homestead Chile, married Zoila Espinosa in 1917, and began to farm near Cunco. Powerful landowners, pushed Segundo, Zoila and other settlers off of those lands, so they migrated to the more marginal lands of Caburgua. They homesteaded about 1.6 kilometres (0.99 mi) south of the lake and together cleared the forest, built their humble dwelling, and began a family.

In the 1970s during the years of the Pinochet dictatorship, many Mapuche natives were cheated out of their lands through land grants, as well as adulterated and falsified sales. Former presidents of Chile such as Michelle Bachelet and Sebastian Piñera own land in the area.
