= Liucura River =

Coordinates: 39°13′14″S 71°43′26″W

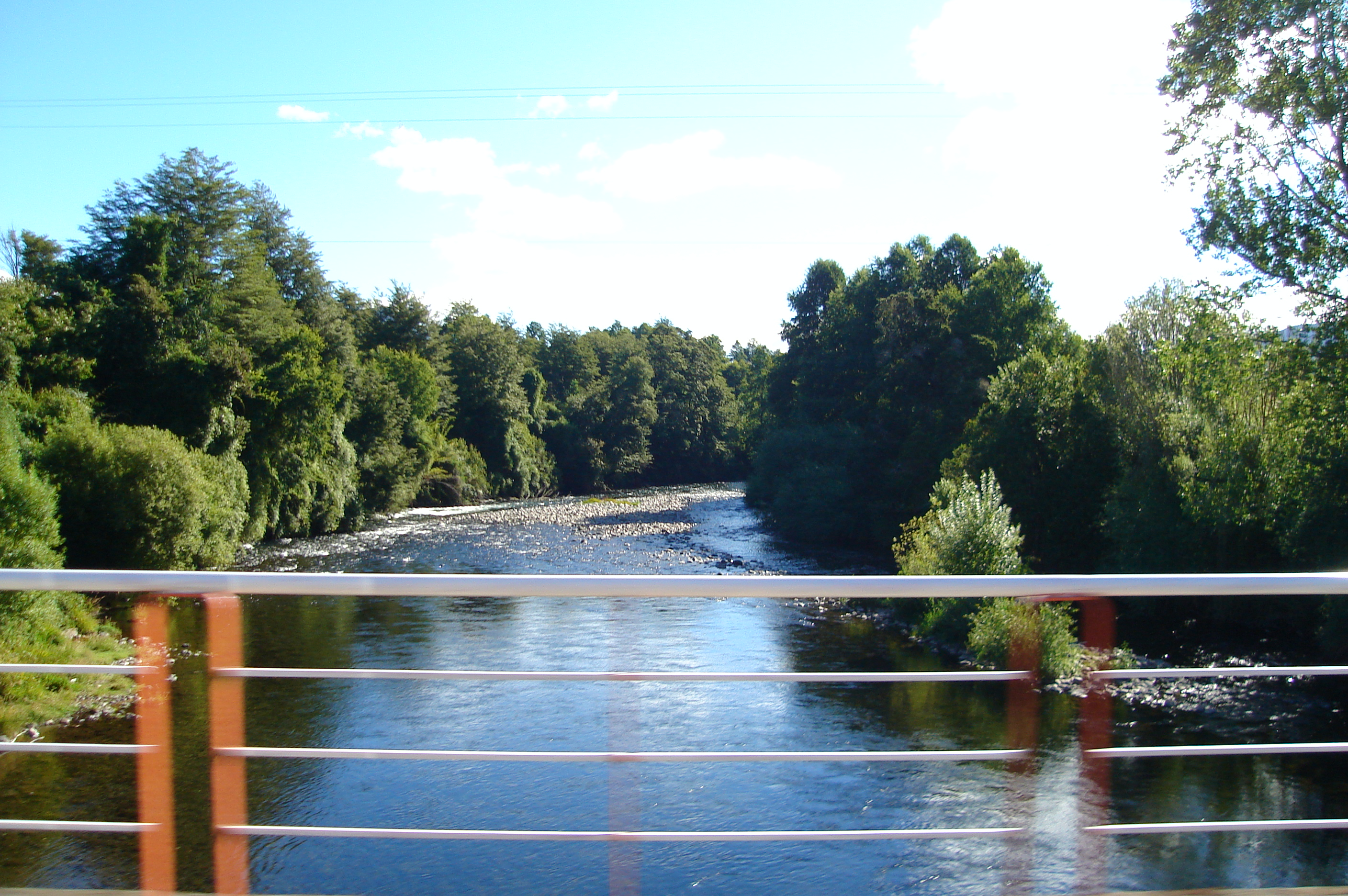
- The river in 2011

Location
- Country: Chile

Physical characteristics
- Mouth
  - location: Trancura River
- Length: 31 km (19 mi)

The Liucura River is a river of Chile. It is fed by some rivers that originate in Huerquehue National Park, which include the outflow of Tinquilco Lake.

== See also ==
- List of rivers of Chile
