= Tinquilco Lake =

Lake in Chile

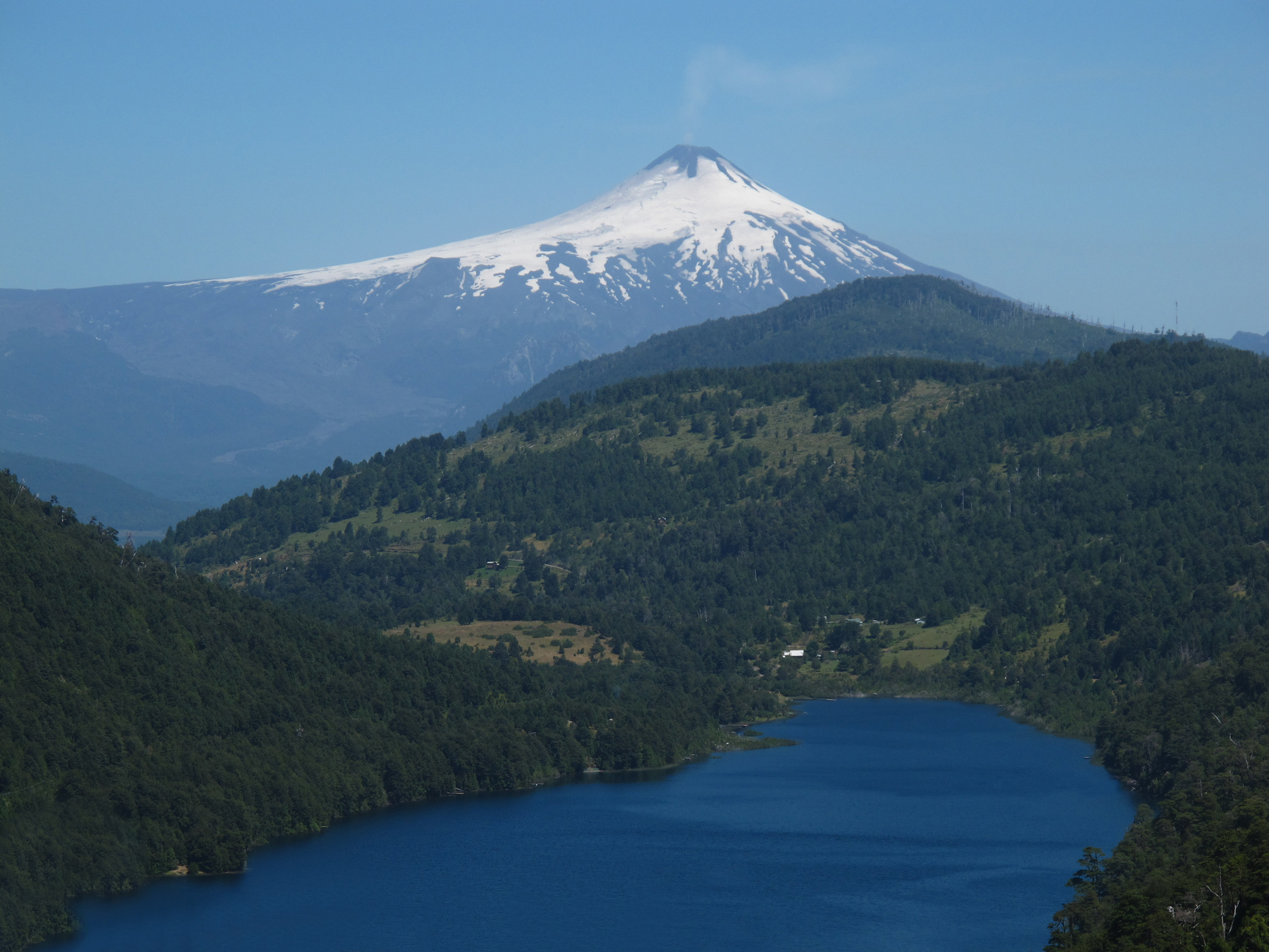
- View from a lookout point on the Tres Lagos hiking trail. The volcano in the distance is Villarrica.

- Location within Chile
- Location: Huerquehue National Park, Araucania Region
- Coordinates: 39.1652°S 71.7252°W
- Type: Glacial
- Primary outflows: Quinchol River
- Basin countries: Chile
- Surface area: 1.1 km^{2} (0.42 sq mi)
- Surface elevation: 700 m (2,300 ft)

Tinquilco Lake is one of several lakes in Huerquehue National Park in the La Araucanía Region in southern Chile. Located at 700 meters; it is the first lake visitors encounter in the park before continuing on the "Tres Lagos" (Lago Chico, Lago Toro and Laguna Verde) hike.

Its primary outflow is Quinchol River, which is a tributary of the Liucura River, which in turn is a tributary of the Trancura River.
