= Villarrica National Reserve =

Coordinates: 38°58′S 71°31′W

- IUCN category IV (habitat/species management area)
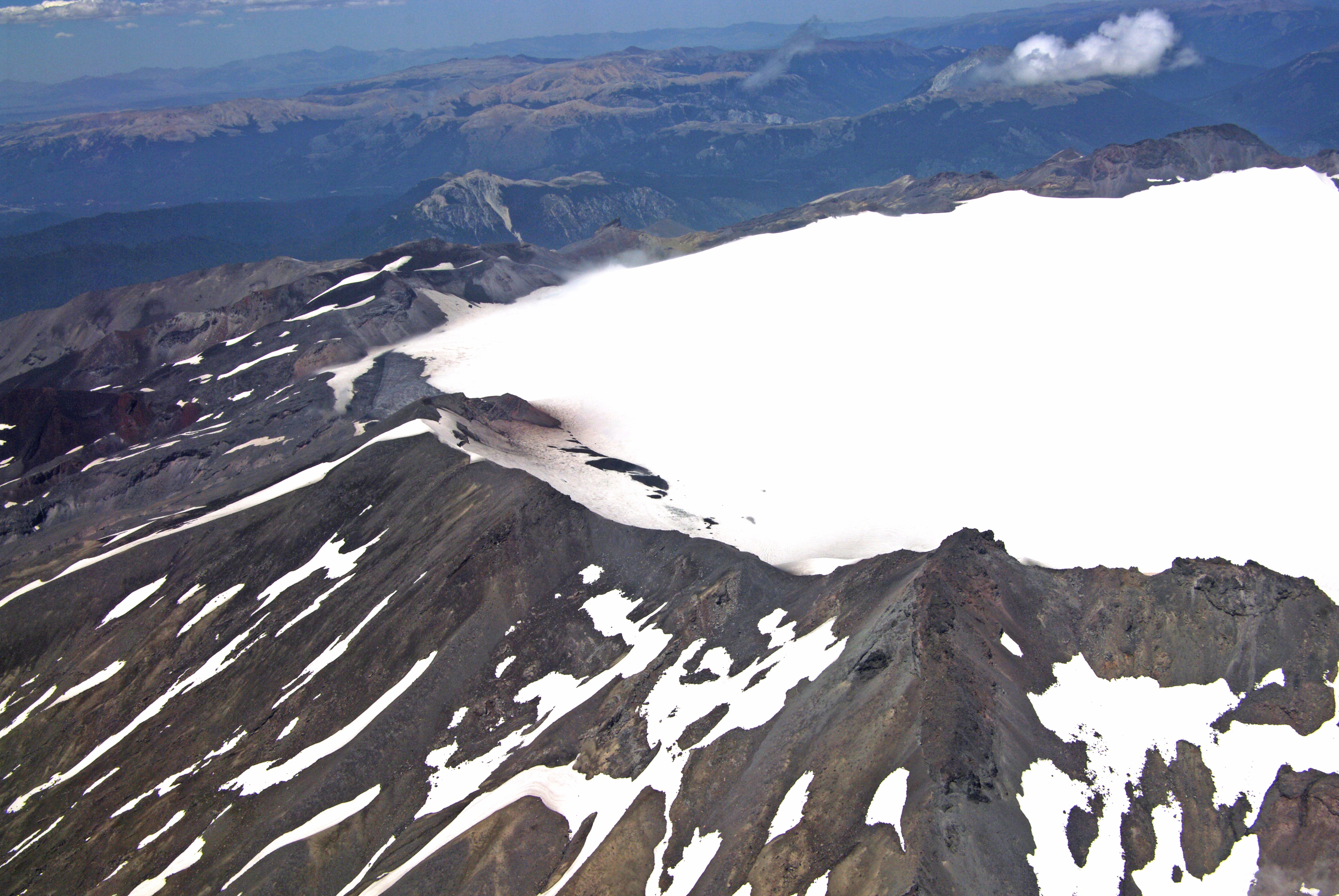
- Nevados de Sollipulli is part of the Hualalafquén section of the reserve.
- Interactive map of Villarrica National Reserve
- Location: Chile
- Area: 615 km^{2} (152,000 acres)
- Established: 1912

Villarrica National Reserve is a national reserve in Chile. It consists of eleven separate sections and is also known as Hualalafquén, which in turn is the name of the main section of the reserve.

The reserve's boundaries have changed since its creation. Its original extension was reduced to create Huerquehue and Villarrica National Parks.

The reserve is accessible via Chile Route 199.

== History ==
It was created as the Villarrica Forest Reserve under Supreme Decree No. 1722 of the Ministry of Industry and Public Works on October 18, 1912. It had 165,000 hectares, where oak was the most abundant species, although coigüe dominated in certain parts, with some raulis, lingues, muermos and lleuque.
