= Huerquehue National Park =

National park in Chile

- IUCN category II (national park)
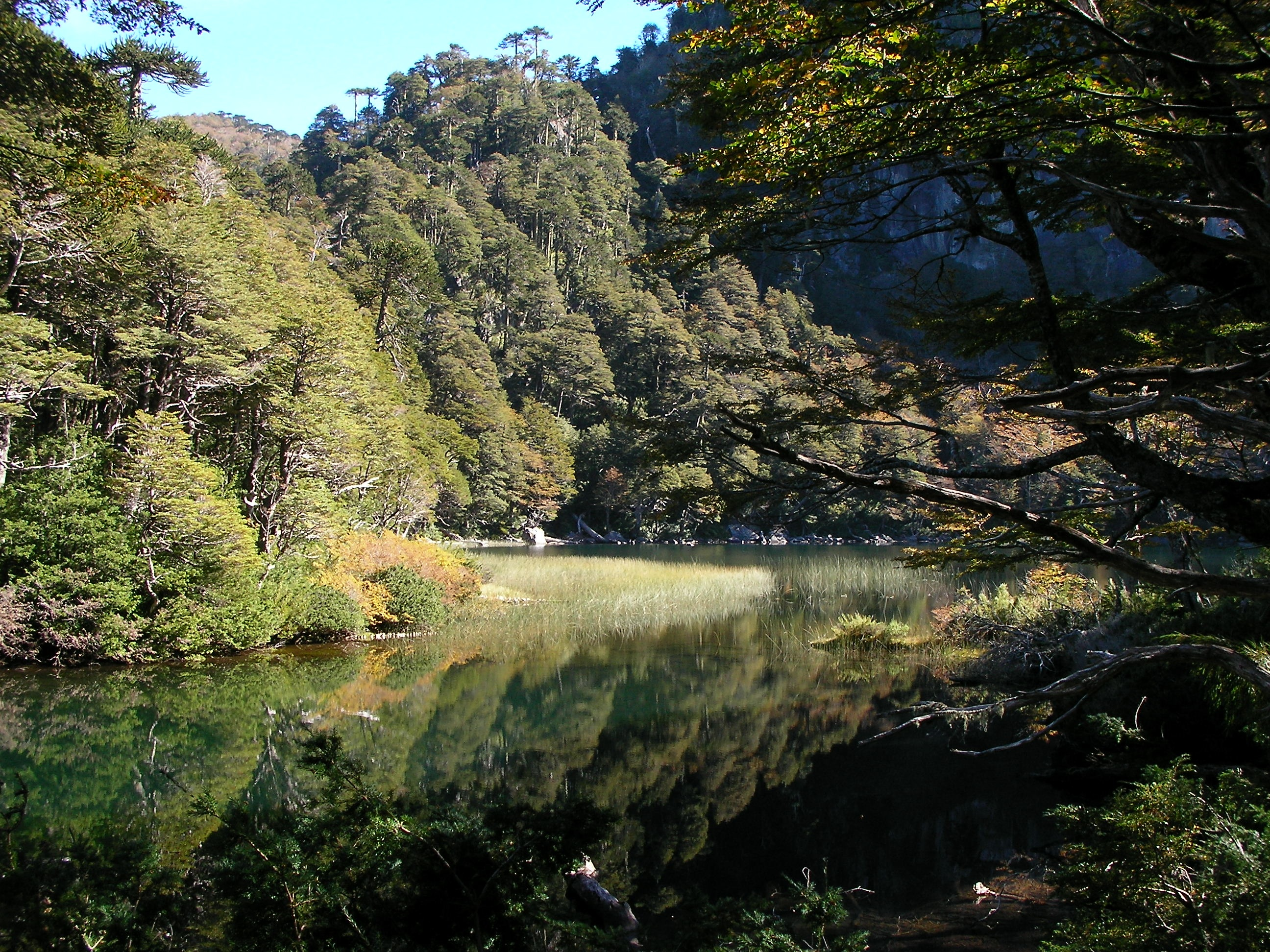
- a view along the Three Lakes Hiking Trail.
- Interactive map of Huerquehue National Park
- Location: La Araucanía Region, Chile
- Nearest city: Pucón
- Coordinates: 39°08′19″S 71°39′59″W
- Area: 125 km^{2} (48 sq mi)
- Established: 1967
- Governing body: Corporación Nacional Forestal

Huerquehue National Park (Spanish pronunciation: [weɾˈkewe]) is located in the foothills of the Andes, in the Valdivian temperate rainforest of the La Araucanía region in southern Chile. It lies 145 km southeast of Temuco and 33 km east of Pucón, between the Villarrica National Reserve to the west and the Hualalafquén National Reserve to the east. The park encompasses 125 square kilometres (12,500 ha) of mountainous terrain east of Caburgua Lake, and has an elevation range of 720 to 2,000 m asl.

The national park was created on June 9, 1967 in order to protect the area. However, its origins date back to 1912 and the creation of "Benjamín Vicuña Mackenna Park", also known as "Colico", which encompassed 265,000 Ha. Today, that land is divided into various different parks and reserves.

Huerquehue is a Mapudungun word (the language of the Mapuche people) that means "the messenger’s place". One of the most noteworthy features of Huerquehue National Park are its ancient Araucaria (Araucaria araucana) forests, the tree commonly known as "monkey puzzle". These are the backdrop for the clear lakes and lagoons that dot the park, including Tinquilco Lake, which lies in the lower portion of this protected area.

== Access ==
The park main entrance lies 2 kilometres from Tinquilco Lake on Kilometre 20 of the road to Caburga Lake. The park ranger’s cabin is located at this main entrance. The park is open all year round.

== Climate ==
The park experiences two main seasonal climates throughout the year: a warm summer with less than four dry months, and a cold, icy winter caused by the high altitude. The wettest months are from May to September, with an annual rainfall index of 2,045 mm (80 in).

== Hydrography ==
Most basins in this area are exorheic (open and closed lakes), both lentic (still waters) and lotic (flowing streams). The largest water courses are the rivers Renahue Blanco and Quinchol. There are also several permanent minor water courses. There are 20 bodies of water, most of which are smaller than 7.5 ha. The most important water sources are the lakes (27.5 ha) and Verde (32.5 ha), and the ponds, Los Patos, Huerquehue, Escondida, Seca, Clara, Las Avutardas, Angelina and Los Cóndores, among others. Those water bodies belong to the hydrographic basin of Toltén River.

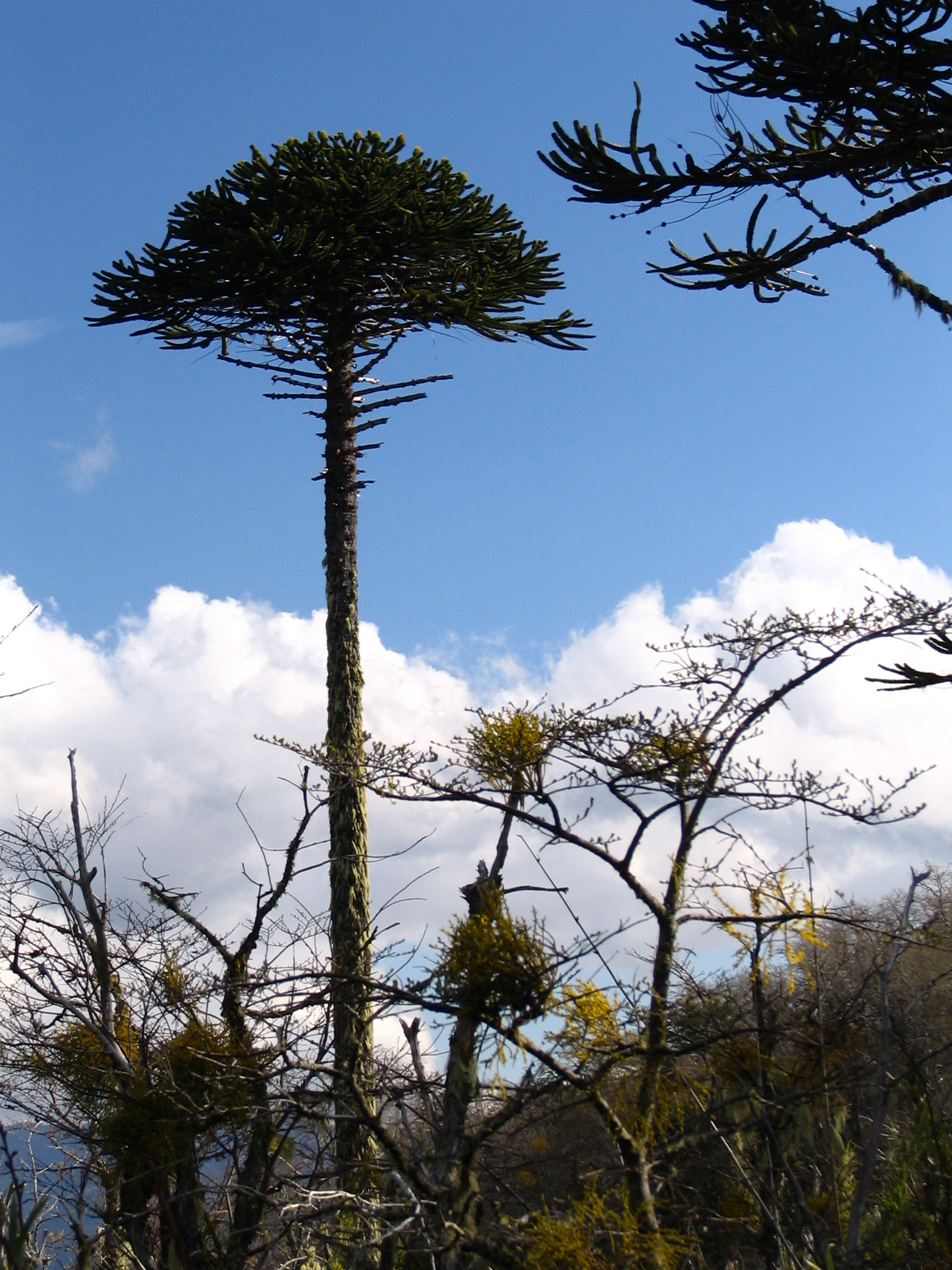
Araucaria (Araucaria araucana)

== Flora ==
Located in the region known as Valdivian temperate rainforest, the forest can be more specifically described as Andean-Patagonian forest, and lies in a sub-region called the Araucanía Mountain range. The park also belongs to the region of deciduous forests, and within it, to the sub-region of the Andean deciduous forests. The first sub-region features the High-Andean deciduous forests with Araucaria araucana, while the second has the mixed Andean deciduous forest. The araucaria, which is currently considered a vulnerable species, is one of the most notable features of Huerquehue National Park.

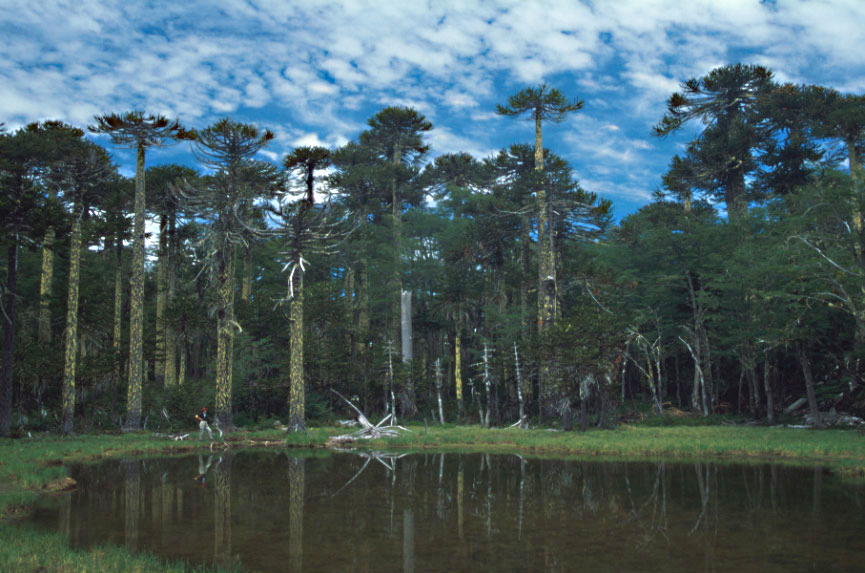
Lagoon Los Patos

== Fauna ==
Some of the protected species that can be found in the park are:

Mammals

- Kodkod or Güiña (Leopardus guigna; endangered)
- Pudú - The world's smallest deer (Vulnerable)
- Geoxus or Long-clawed mole mouse (Geoxus valdivianus; rare)
- Culpeo or Andean Fox (Lycalopex culpaeus) - similar to the red fox, the culpeo is the second largest canid of the continent (Least concern)

Birds

- Peregrine falcon (Endangered)
- Chilean pigeon (Vulnerable)
- Magellanic woodpecker (Vulnerable)
- Condor (Rare)
- Black-necked swan (Least Concern)
- Slender-billed parakeet or Choroy Parakeet (Least Concern)

Amphibians

- Darwin's frog or southern Darwin’s frog (Vulnerable)
Huerquehue National Park Fauna

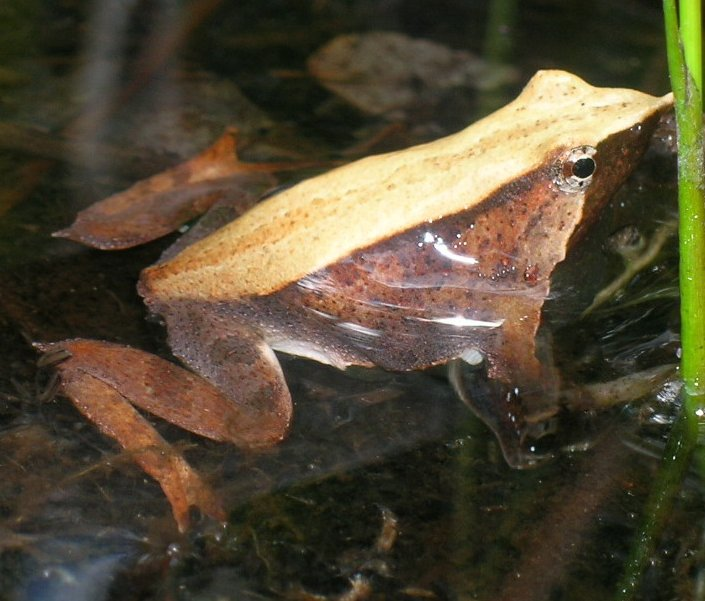
Darwin's frog (Rhinoderma darwinii)

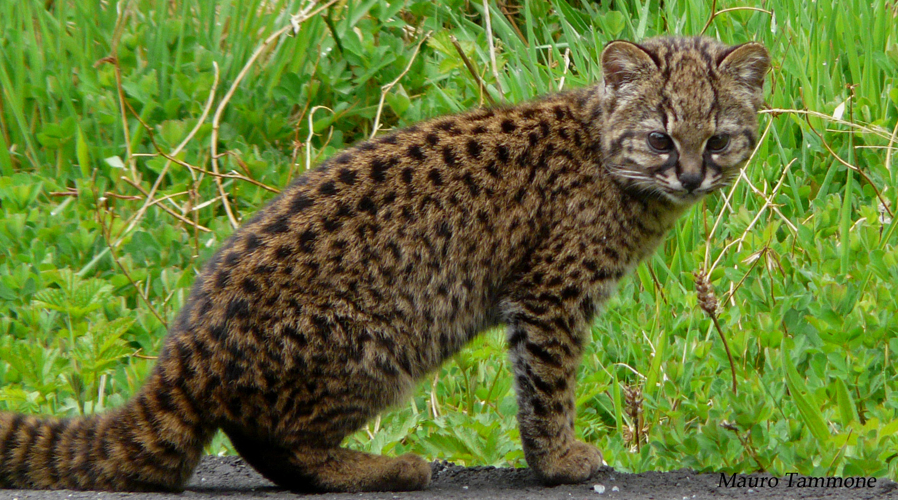
Kodkod - Leopardus guigna, or Güiña

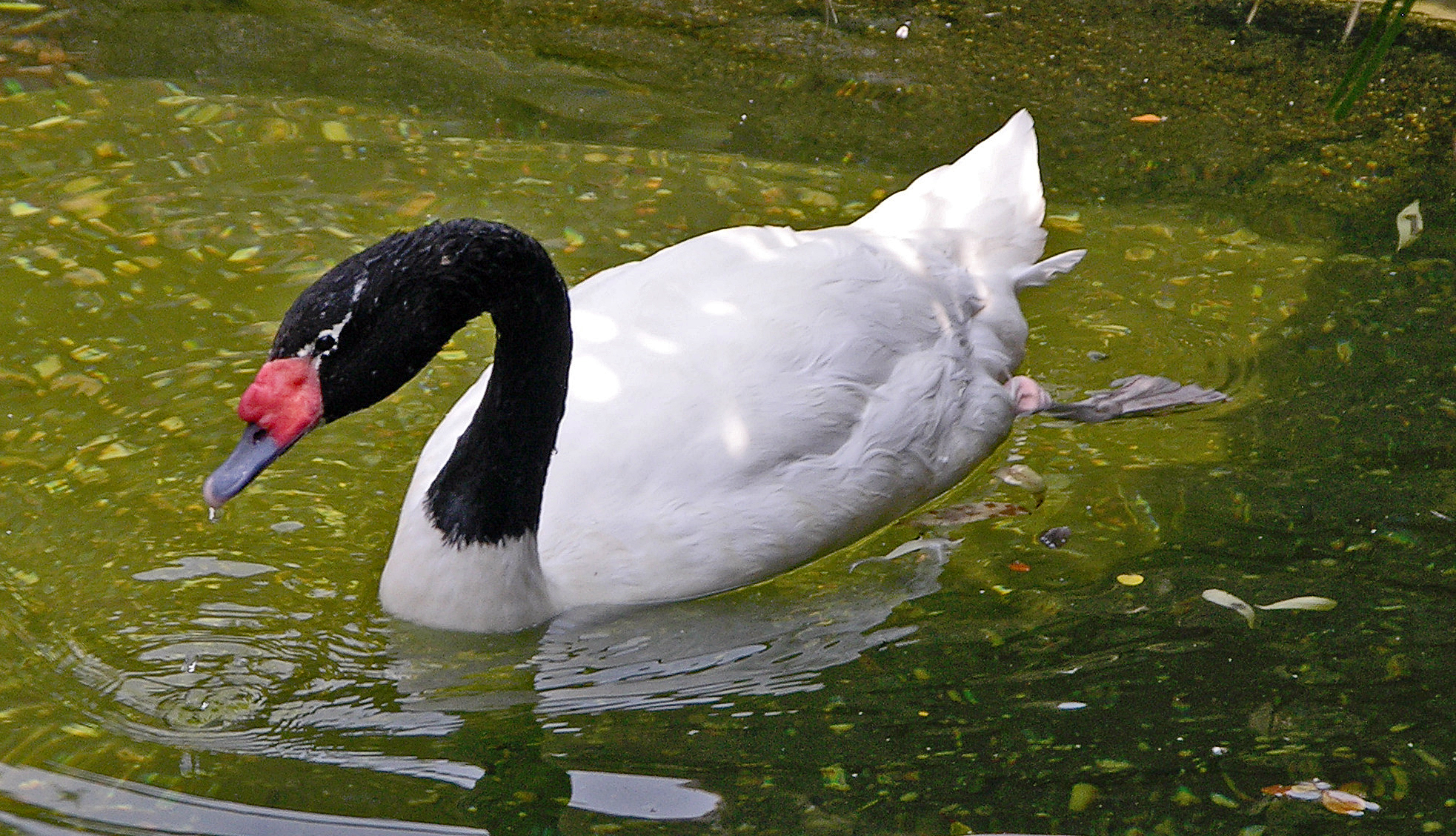
Black necked swan

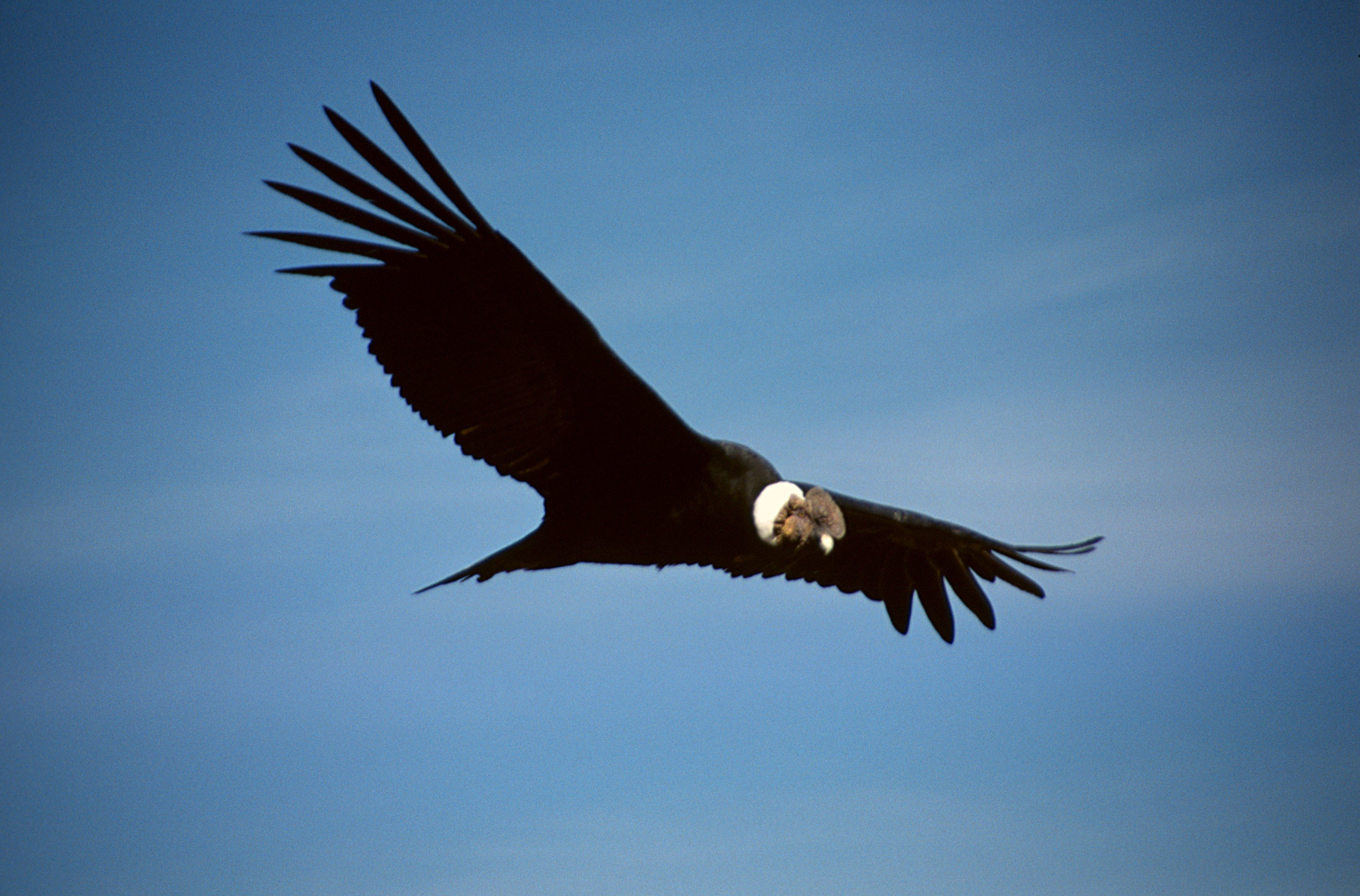
Andean condor

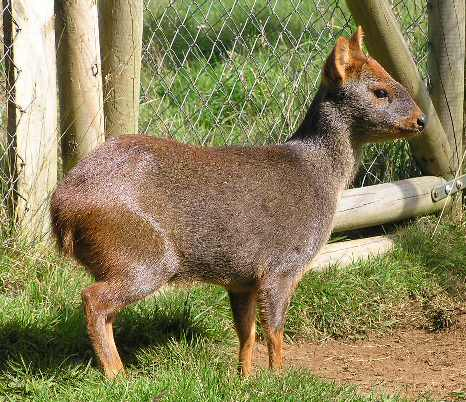
Pudú
