= Toltén River =

River in Chile

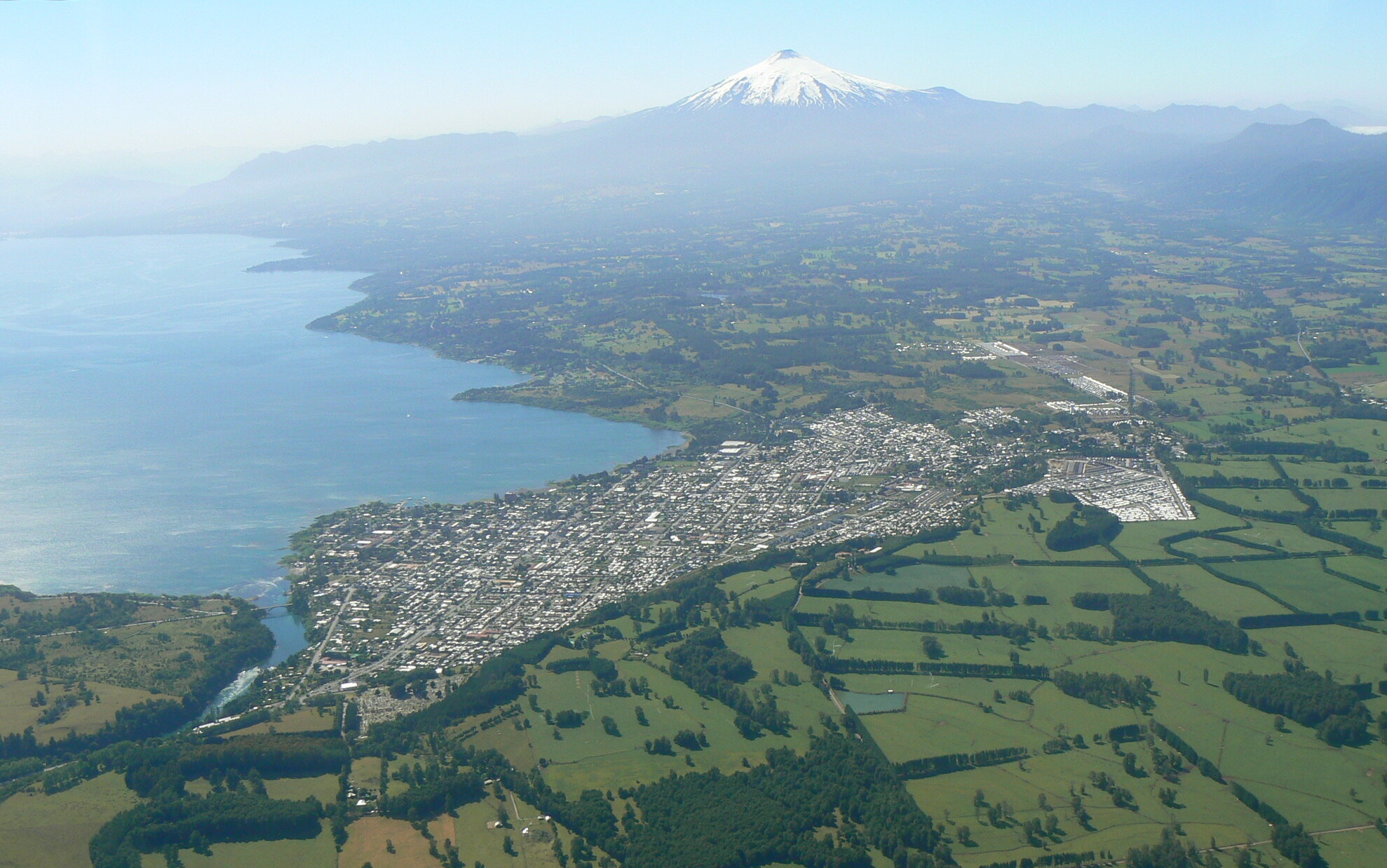
- The source of the river is visible in the lower left corner.

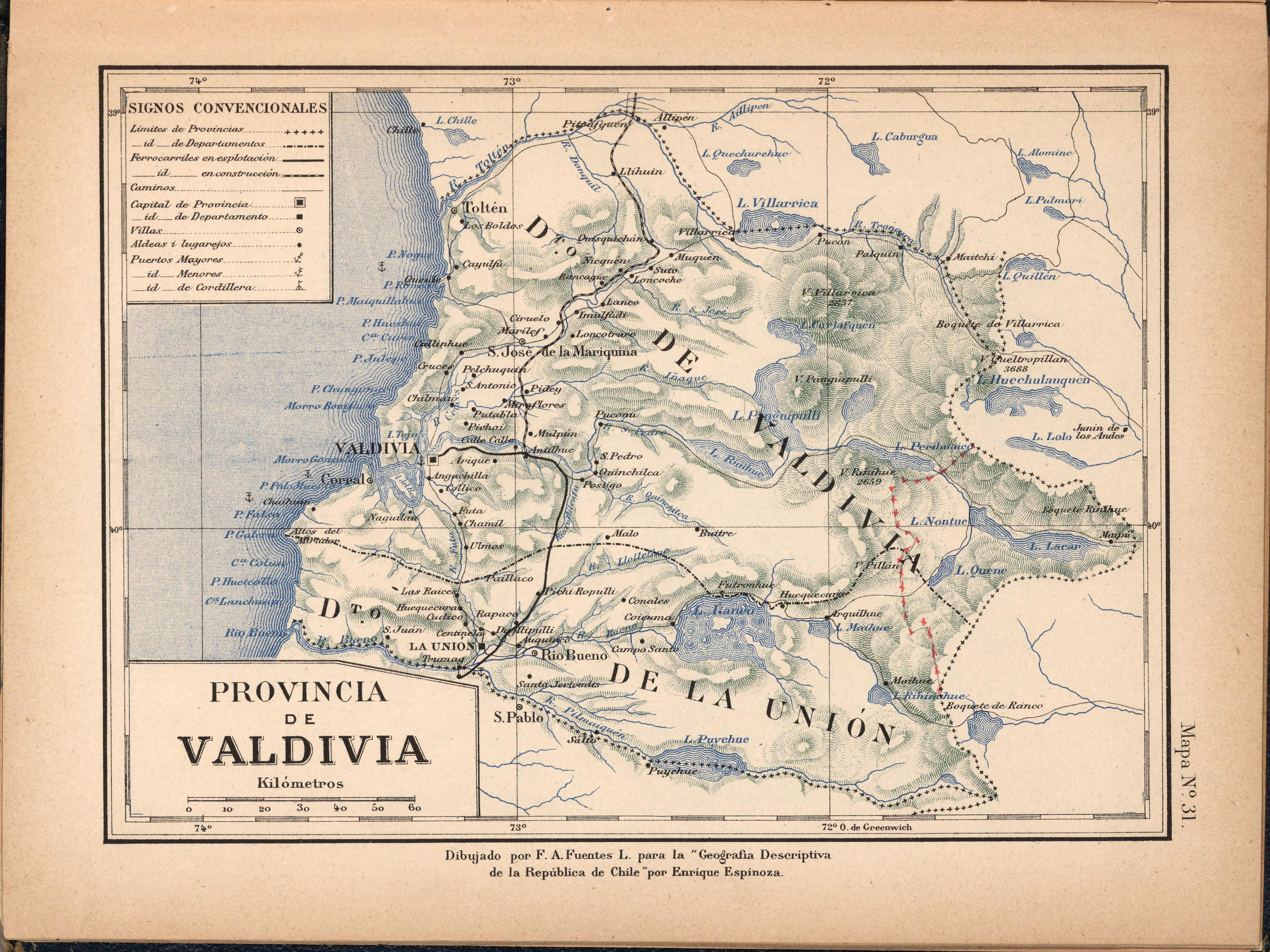
- Tolten River in a 1903 map

- Location of mouth

Location
- Country: Chile

Physical characteristics
- Source
  - location: Villarrica Lake
  - elevation: 230 m (750 ft)
- Mouth
  - location: Pacific Ocean
  - coordinates: 39°15′04″S 73°13′24″W
  - elevation: 0 m (0 ft)
- Length: 123 km (76 mi)
- Basin size: 8,398 km^{2} (3,242 sq mi)

Toltén River is a river located in the La Araucanía Region of Chile. It rises at Villarrica Lake, close to the city of the same name. Its major tributary is the Allipén River. From its confluence with the Allipén, the river follows a braided course.

After flowing for about 123 km, the river reaches the Pacific Ocean near Punta Nilhue, where it is about 500 m wide.

Cities and towns along the Toltén include: Villarrica, Pitrufquén, Teodoro Schmidt and Nueva Toltén.
