= Trancura River =

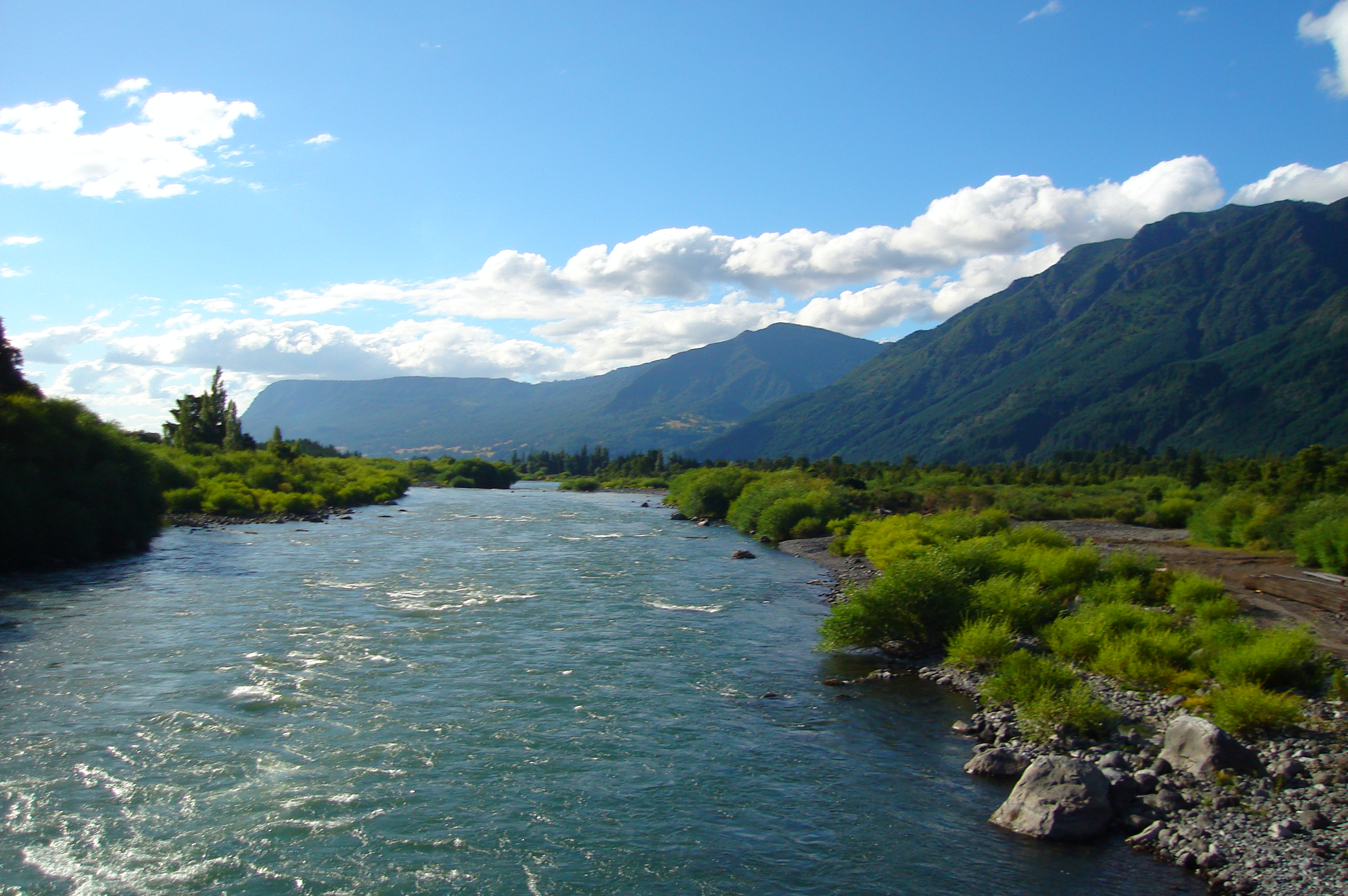

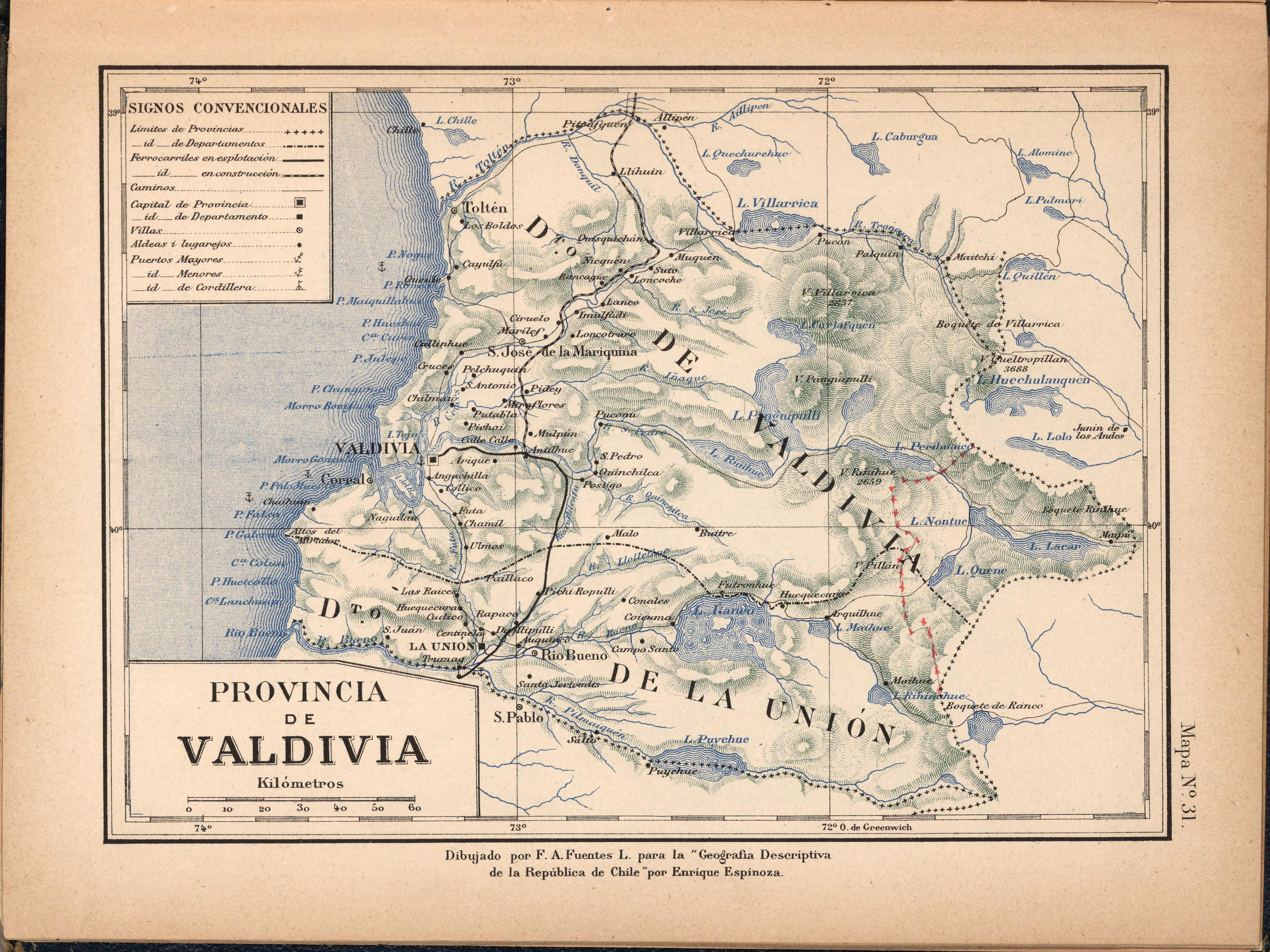
- Trancura River, east of Villarica Lake in a 1903 map

Location
- Country: Chile

Physical characteristics
- Mouth
  - location: Villarrica Lake
  - coordinates: 39°14′15″S 71°57′49″W
- Length: 78 km (48 mi)

The Trancura River (also known as Pucón River or Minetúe River) is a river located in the La Araucanía Region of Chile. Its headwaters drain the southeasternmost portion of Villarrica National Park, including the northwestern slope of Lanín volcano. The river flows initially to the north and from its junction with its main tributary, the Maichín River, the Trancura turns in a westerly direction until emptying into the Villarrica Lake, after having received the waters of Caburgua Lake through the Carrileufú River. This latter river emerges at the Ojos del Caburgua and is fed by the Liucura River, which further has as a tributary the outflow stream of Tinquilco Lake.

The town of Curarrehue is located near its confluence with the Maichín River. The river is used for rafting and whitewater kayaking by tourism companies in Pucón. The river is split into two sections, the Upper Trancura and the Lower Trancura. The Upper Trancura is rated as a Class IV whitewater river with one Class V rapid, Salto Marimán, that is commonly portaged. The Lower section is rated as a Class III whitewater river.

== See also ==
- List of rivers of Chile
