= Lake Villarrica =

Lake in Chile

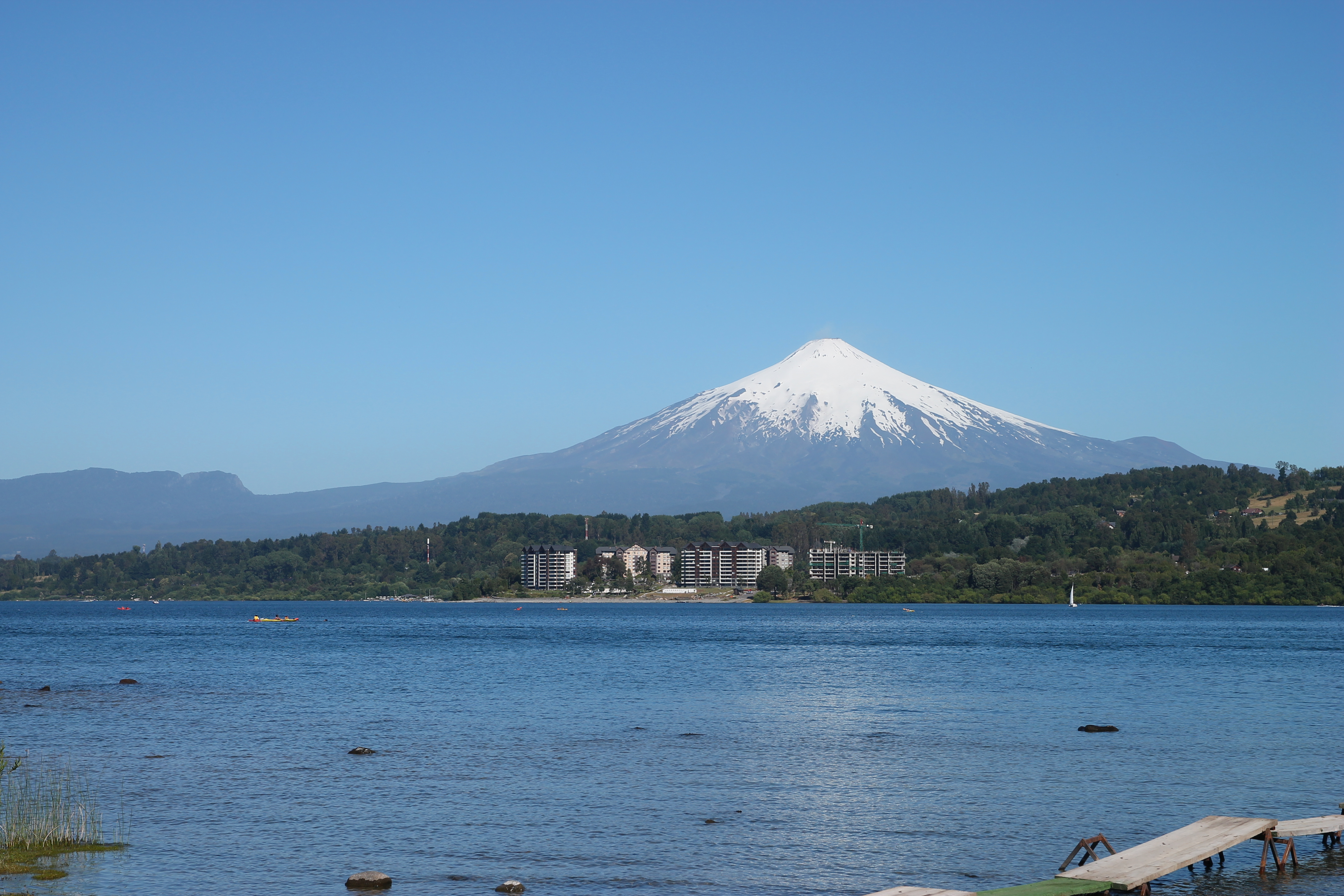
- Vie of Lake Villarrica from the eponymous town. Villarrica Volcano is seen in the background.

- Location within Chile

- Location: Cautín Province
- Coordinates: 39°15′S 72°05′W
- Primary inflows: Trancura River
- Primary outflows: Toltén River
- Basin countries: Chile
- Max. length: 23 km (14 mi)
- Max. width: 11 km (6.8 mi)
- Surface area: 176 km^{2} (68 sq mi)
- Average depth: 120 m (390 ft)
- Max. depth: 165 m (541 ft)
- Water volume: 21 km^{3} (5.0 cu mi)
- Shore length^{1}: 71.2 km (44.2 mi)
- Surface elevation: 230 m (750 ft)
- Settlements: Villarrica, Pucón
- ^{1} Shore length is not a well-defined measure.

Lake Villarrica, also known as Mallalafquén (its pre-Hispanic name is Mapudungun), is located about 700 kilometers south of Santiago in Chile's Lake District in the southeast area of the Province of Cautín. On its east shore lies the city of Pucón, a major tourist attraction and a popular ski resort, and on the west shore lies the town of Villarrica.

Water sports such as sailing, kayaking, sport fishing and water skiing are popular in the summer due to the lake's warm waters (surface temperatures range from 19 to 22 °C). In winter, the average water temperature is around 10 °C.

The Villarrica Volcano, one of the ten most active in the world, is situated to the south of the lake. There are two Chile National Parks close by: the Huerquehue and the Villarrica. The latter is famous for its natural hot springs.

== Gallery ==
View of the lake from the town of Villarrica

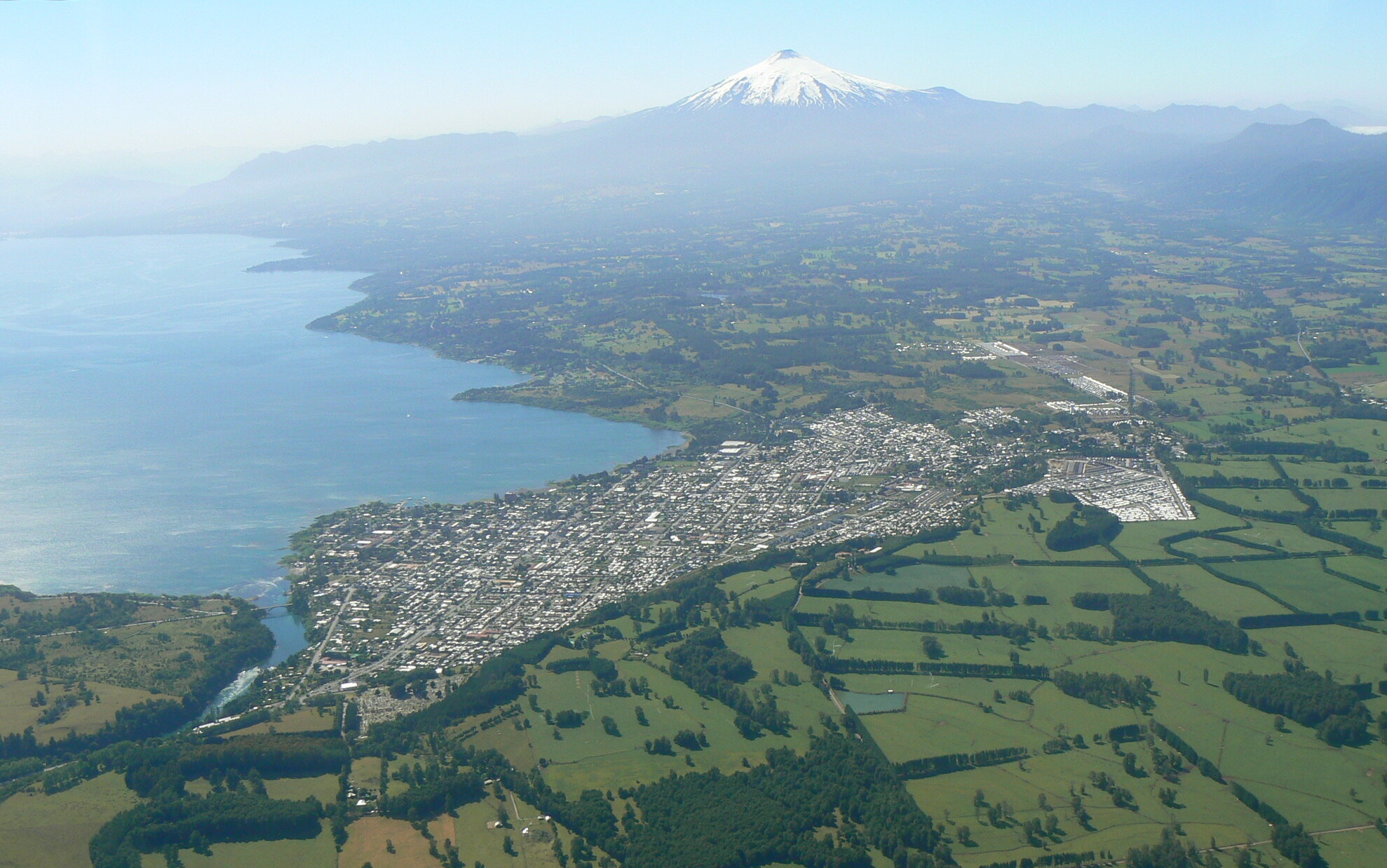
Aerial view of Lake Villarrica, the town of Villarrica and Villarrica Volcano
