= Villarrica (volcano) =

Active volcano in southern Chile

Villarrica Volcano
- Ruka Pillañ
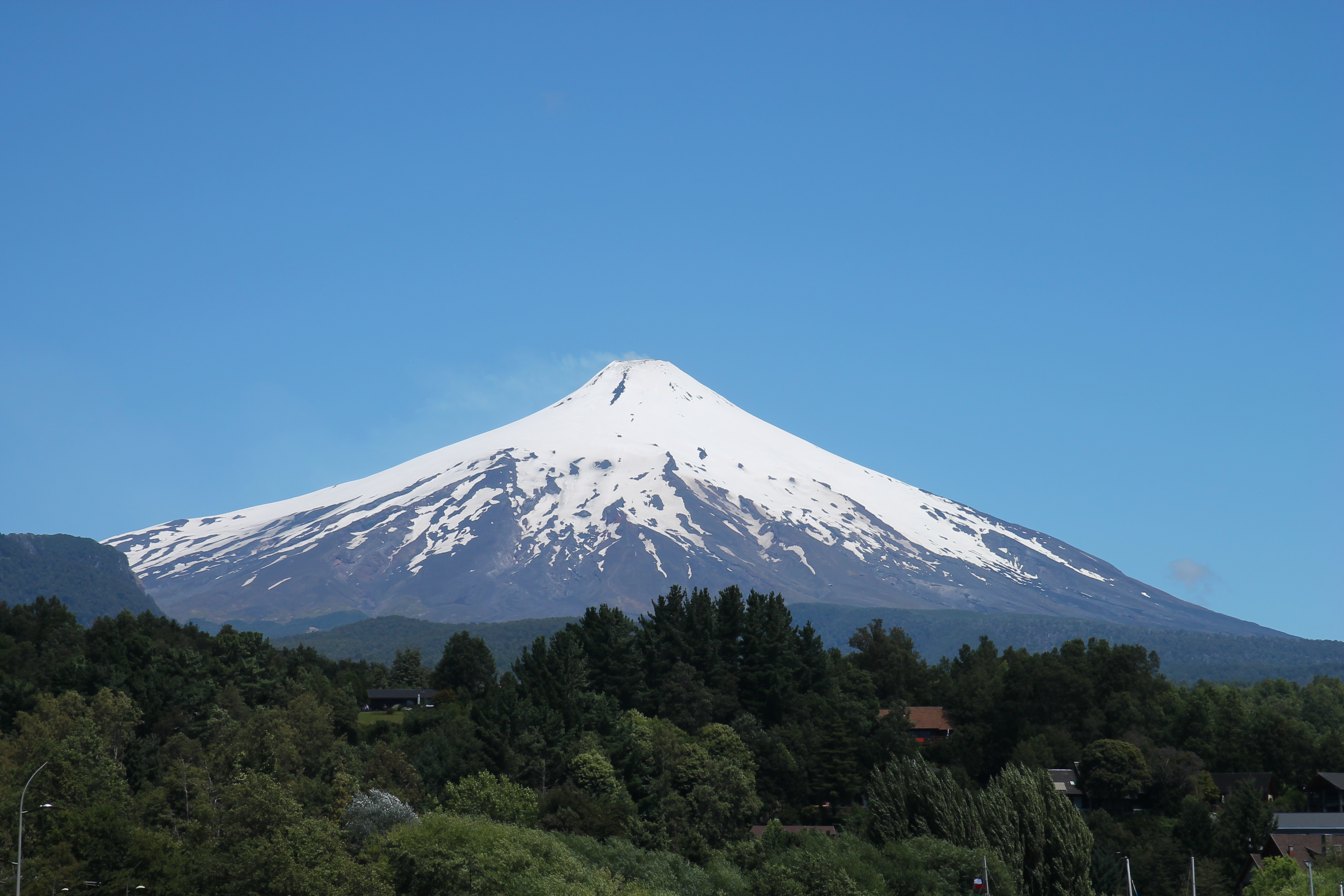
- View of Villarrica Volcano

Highest point
- Elevation: 2,860 m (9,380 ft)
- Prominence: 1,575 m (5,167 ft)
- Listing: Region high point Ultra
- Coordinates: 39°25′15″S 71°56′21″W

Naming
- English translation: Place of Wealth
- Language of name: Spanish

Geography
- Location within Chile
- Location: Southern Chile
- Parent range: Andes

Geology
- Rock age: < Upper Pleistocene
- Mountain type: Stratovolcano
- Volcanic belt: South Volcanic Zone
- Last eruption: 2025

Climbing
- First ascent: 1883, Chilean Army
- Easiest route: Villarrica ski centre – Piedra Negra

Villarrica ( /ˌviːəˈriːkə/ VEE-ə-REE-kə) (Spanish: Volcán Villarrica, Mapudungun: Ruka Pillañ) is one of Chile's most active volcanoes, rising above the lake and town of the same name, 750 km (470 mi) south of Santiago. It is also known as Rucapillán, a Mapuche word meaning "great spirit's house" or " the demon's house". It is the westernmost of three large stratovolcanoes that trend northwest to southeast obliquely perpendicular to the Andean chain along the Mocha-Villarrica Fault Zone, and along with Quetrupillán and the Chilean portion of Lanín, are protected within Villarrica National Park. Guided ascents are popular during summer months.

Villarrica, with its lava of basaltic-andesitic composition, is one of a small number worldwide known to have an active (but in this case intermittent) lava lake within its crater. The volcano usually generates strombolian eruptions with ejection of incandescent pyroclasts and lava flows. Rainfall plus melted snow and glacier ice can cause massive lahars (mud and debris flows), such as during the eruptions of 1964 and 1971.

Villarrica is one of 9 volcanoes currently monitored by the Deep Earth Carbon Degassing Project. The project is collecting data on the carbon dioxide and sulphur dioxide emission rates from subaerial volcanoes.

== Geography and geology ==
Villarica stands just east of the Chilean Central Valley as the westernmost of an alignment of three large stratovolcanoes. The alignment is attributed to the existence of an old fracture in the crust, the North West-South East trending Mocha-Villarrica Fault Zone, the other volcanoes in the chain, Quetrupillán and Lanín, are far less active. The alignment is unusual as it crosses the N-S running Liquiñe-Ofqui Fault, along which several active volcanoes are aligned.

Villarrica covers an area of 400 km^{2} and has an estimated volume of 250 km^{3}. It contains volcanic caves and about 26 scoria cones. The constant degassing at the lava lake turns the otherwise quite effusive lava more viscous, heightening its explosive potential. Two large ignimbrite layers are visible; the Licán Ignimbrite and the more recent Pucón Ignimbrite.

Villarrica emerged during the Middle Pleistocene and grew forming a large stratocone of similar dimensions to the current edifice. 100,000 years ago during the Valdivia Interglacial the ancestral Villarrica collapsed following an eruption and formed a large elliptical caldera of 6.5 and 4.2 km in diameter. During the Llanquihue glaciation Villarrica produced pyroclastic flow deposits, subglacial andesite lavas and dacite dykes. It collapsed once again 13,700 years ago forming a new smaller caldera, among other pyroclastic flows the Licán Ignimbrite has been related to this event. Beginning with the Licán Ignimbrite, generated just after the last deglaciation, activity continued in similar fashion. The Pucón Ignimbrite was ejected during a minor collapse of the uppermost stratocone 3,700 years ago.

=== Glaciers ===
The upper part of Villarrica is permanently covered by snow and has some 40 km^{2} of glaciers, the largest of which is the Pichillancahue-Turbio Glacier situated on its southeastern flank. Ash from the eruptions can increase the ablation of snow and ice by absorption of solar radiation. Some ash coverings are thicker than 5 cm and insulate the glacier, decreasing ablation instead of enhancing it. Between 1961 and 2003, Villarrica lost 25% of its glaciated surface and the glaciers shrank at an average rate of -0.4 km^{2} each year.

== Tourism ==
Villarrica is popular for climbing with guided hikes to the crater from the town of Pucón, but these may be suspended due to cloud or volcanic activity. Helicopter over-flights have been available since 2007. In the winter (July–September) a ski resort operates on the northern slopes. The youngest person to reach the summit recognized by the Chilean government was Christopher Heussner of Texas at the age of 9 in 1999.

== Eruptive history ==
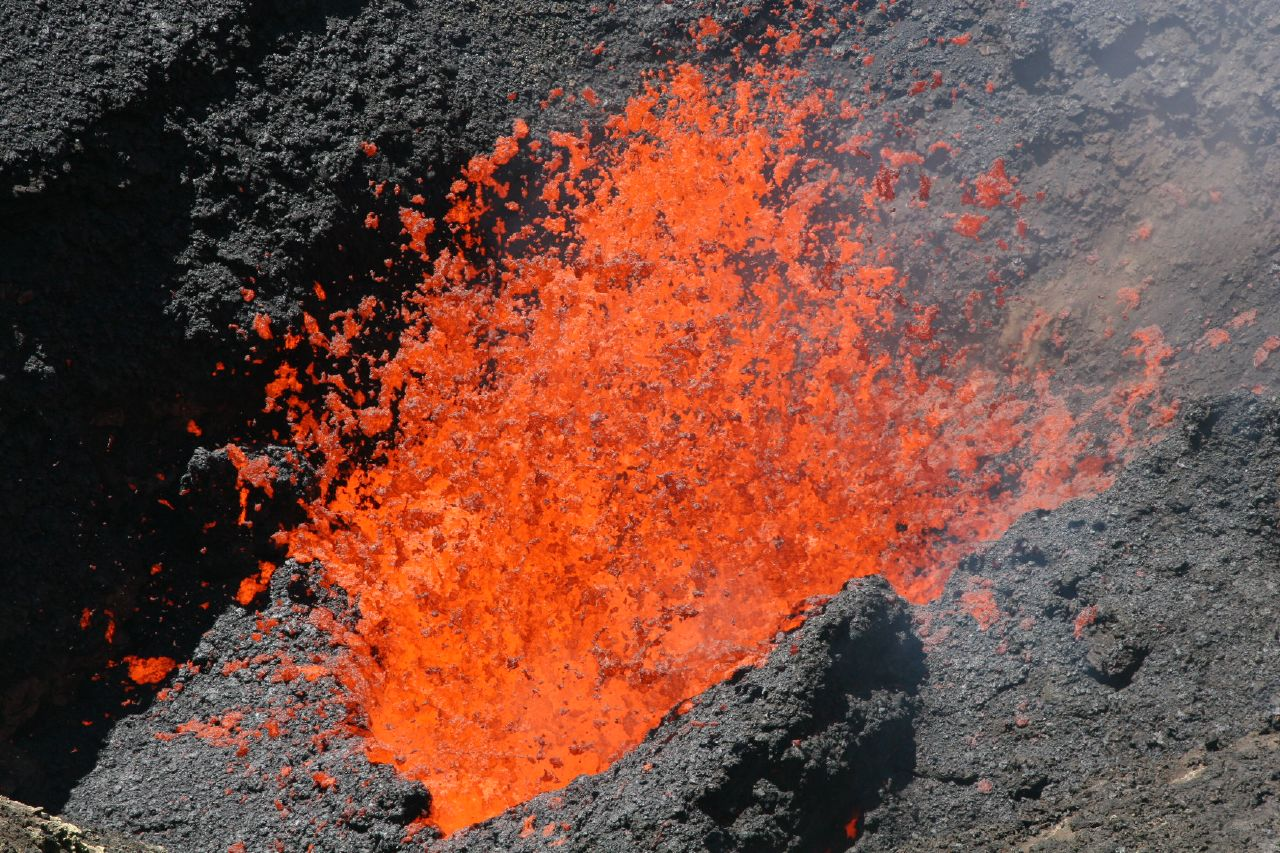
Lava fountain within Villarrica's crater

Villarrica is one of Chile's most active volcanoes; eruptions have been recorded since the conquest of Chile and the founding of the city of Villarrica in 1552. This city was originally founded near the site of present-day Pucón. Villarrica volcano had frequent strombolian eruptions in the second half of the 16th century. Peaks of activity occurred in 1558 and 1562. The 1562 eruption in particular deposited thin ash layers as far as 200 km away from the volcano.

During its early years the city of Villarrica was an important gold and silver mining centre. However mining activity declined over time. It is thought that this decline could be a consequence of burial of gold placers beneath lahars associated with mid-16th century eruptions of Villarrica. This burial would have prompted settlers to move the city westward to its modern site, a place less prone to volcanic hazards. There are uncertainties in the eruptive record in the first half of the 17th century due to the Mapuche and Huilliche uprising which led to the surrender or abandonment of Spanish settlements during the destruction of the Seven Cities.

=== 1963 and 1964 eruptions ===
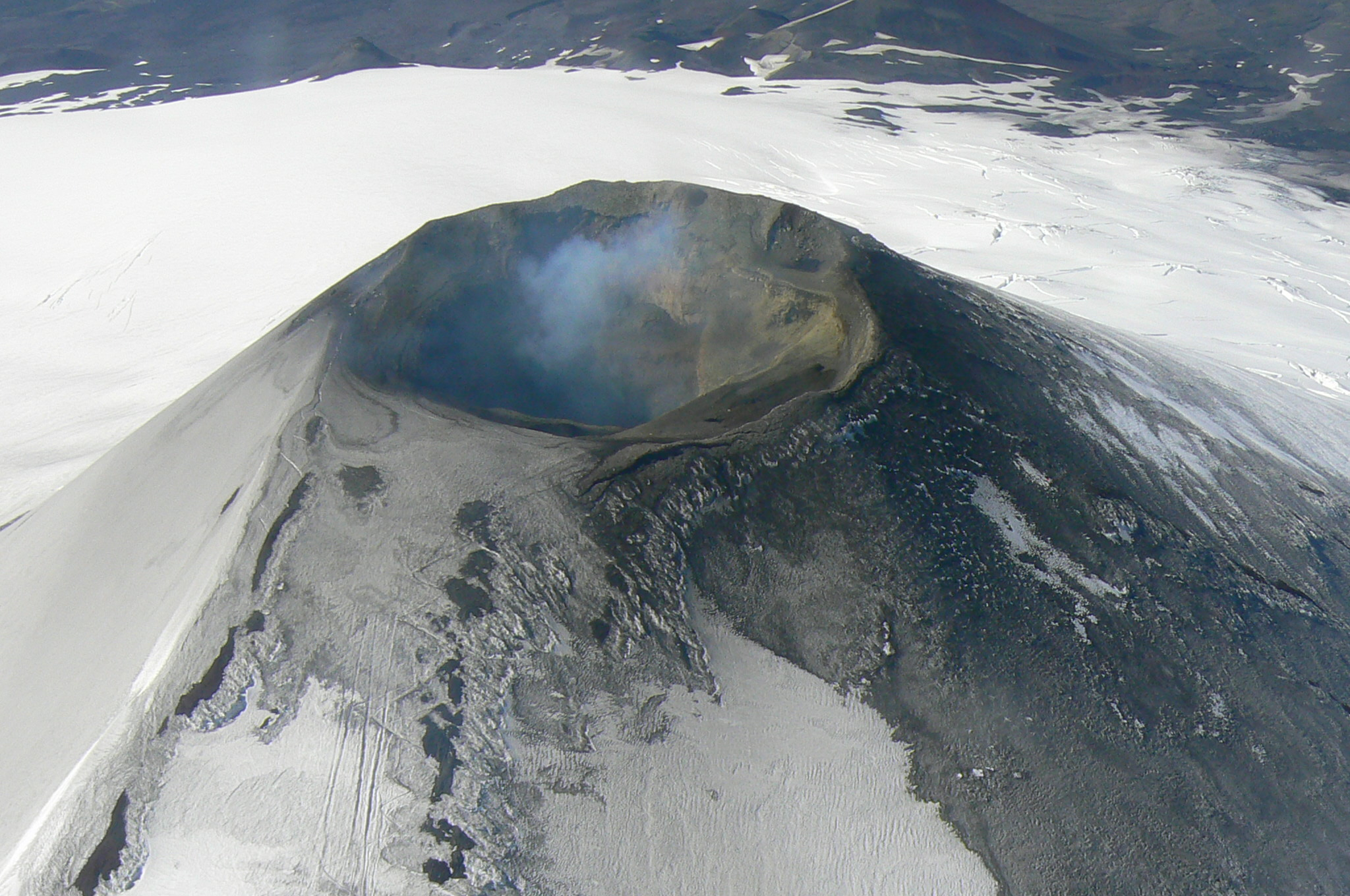
Aerial view of Mount Villarrica

The volcano resumed eruptive activity on March 8, 1963. On March 12 a flank vent some 250 metres below the summit begun to pour lava that ended up making a 1,000 m-long (3,300 ft) and 150 m-broad (490 ft) lava flow. The lava flow had stopped by March 19. Concurrently with this the summit crater continued its strombolian eruption. Explosive eruptions begun once again on May 2, 1963, and the eruption had definitely turned effusive by May 21. The last consequences of this cycle of eruptions were lahars that flowed down the volcano on May 24.

In the two last weeks of February 1964, Villarrica produced small, violent lava effusions and tremors. On 2 March, at 2:45 am, it began a strombolian eruption, and residents of Coñaripe, a wood-logging town, fled to the surrounding hills. At some point, the inhabitants of Coñaripe decided to return to their houses in search of shelter from the heavy rainfall. At midnight a new lava flow advanced downhill melting snow and ice triggering five lahars. Melting snow and ice from the Pichillancahue-Turbio Glacier combined with heavy rainfall to produce several lahars. This situation caught Coñaripe residents unprepared when one of the lahars overwhelmed the town, killing 27 residents. The hamlet of Chaillupén was also destroyed by the lahar, meaning 30 houses were destroyed; however, there were no deaths. Other lahars that flowed north destroyed various bridges between Villarrica and Pucón before entering Villarrica Lake. The sudden inflow of lahars into Villarrica Lake caused the water level to rise, flooding some low-lying pastures.

Some Mapuches blamed settlers for the disaster claiming they had provoked it by cursing the town of Coñaripe. Such views reflect the belief that nature was "allied with the Indians".

=== 1971–1972 eruption ===
1971–1972 eruption of Villarrica
- Start date: October 29, 1971
- End date: February 21, 1972
- Type: Strombolian
- VEI: 2

On 29 October 1971, at 3:00 am, there were several explosions in the crater and a column of white and then black smoke appeared. One month later, at quarter to midnight on 29 November, Villarrica began a new eruptive cycle. Pyroclasts were ejected and the snow surrounding the crater melted. After a brief halt in activity lava poured from a new vent on the north-east side, melting considerable amounts of water and causing lahars. These lahars affected Pichaye, El Turbio, Collentañe, Minetué, Molco, Voipir and Curarrehue, all of them in the Trancura River basin. Toxic sulphurous gases made the air unbreathable in Villarrica and Pucón where at least 15 deaths were reported.

=== 2015 eruption ===
2015 eruption of Villarrica
- Volcano: Villarrica
- Start date: March 3, 2015
- Type: Strombolian
- Location: Villarrica, Araucania Region, Chile
- VEI: 2

Villarrica eruption

On February 7, 2015, Villarrica triggered a yellow alert at both the Servicio Nacional de Geología y Minería and Onemi. Minor explosions and low emissions of ashes were visible. Ten days later, another eruption occurred. The National Service of Geology and Mining (Sernageomin) declared a yellow alert after volcanic and seismic activity increased again, while the National Emergency Office of the Interior Ministry (ONEMI) kept the yellow alert.

At approximately 03:01 AM on March 3, 2015, it erupted, raising the alert to red up to 10 kilometers around. The eruption exceeded the height of the volcano, causing a loud explosion that woke the neighbors, and forcing the evacuation of 3,385 people in nearby communities.

The Southern Andean Volcano Observatory (OVDAS) indicated that a new imminent eruption would continue until 12:29 of March 19, 2015. As of July 2015, the eruption was continuing. Volcanic gas emissions from this volcano are measured by a Multi-Component Gas Analyzer System, which detects pre-eruptive degassing of rising magmas, improving prediction of volcanic activity.

Analysis of seismicity prior to the eruption show that there was no seismicity that could be reliably related to the upcoming eruption. However, a series of small earthquakes with hypocenters about 9 km beneath Villarrica volcano that occurred 45 days after the eruption are thought to have been caused by the cooling of the eruption's feeder dykes.

== See also ==
- List of volcanoes in Chile
- List of Ultras of South America

== Gallery ==
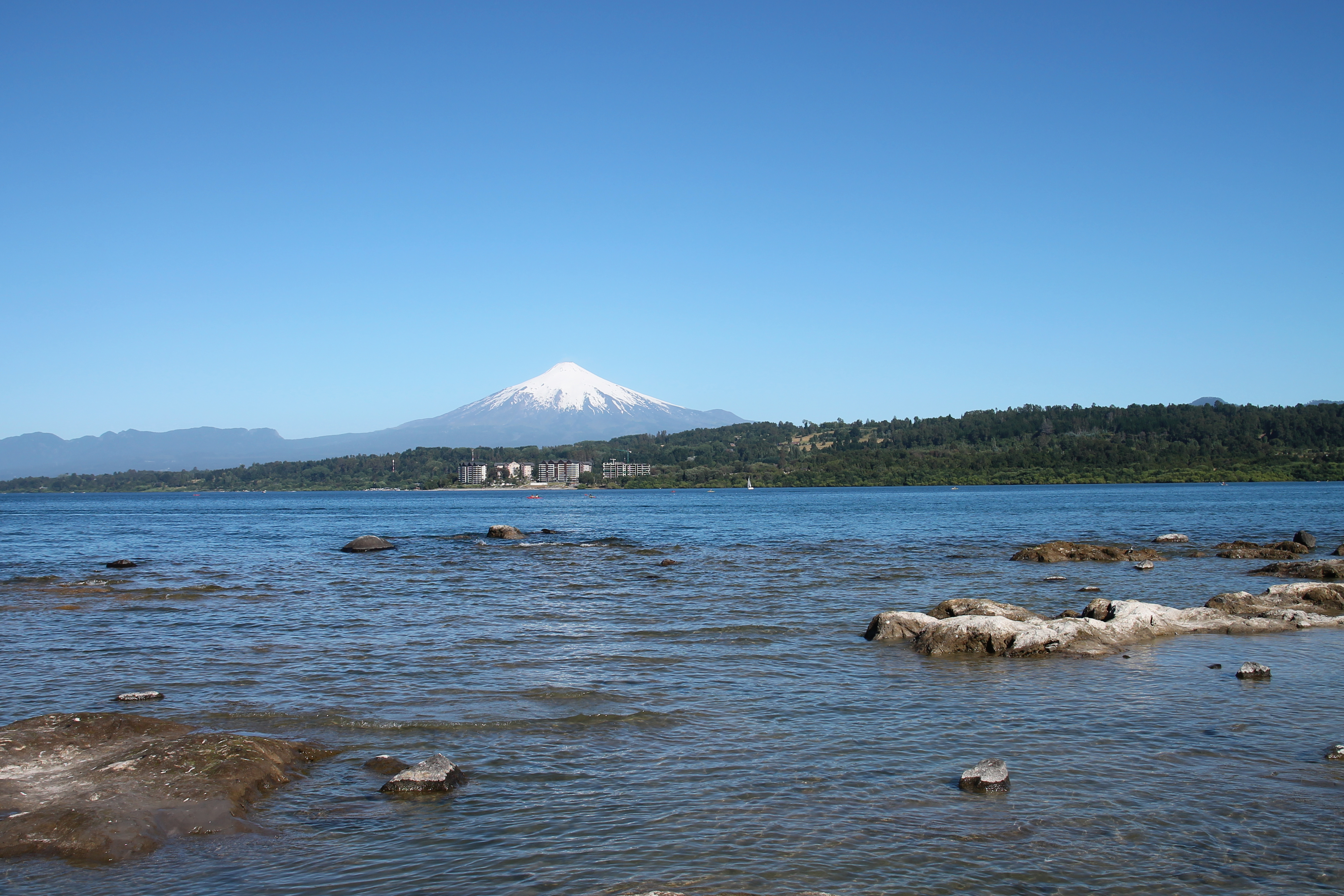
Villarrica Lake and the eponymous volcano

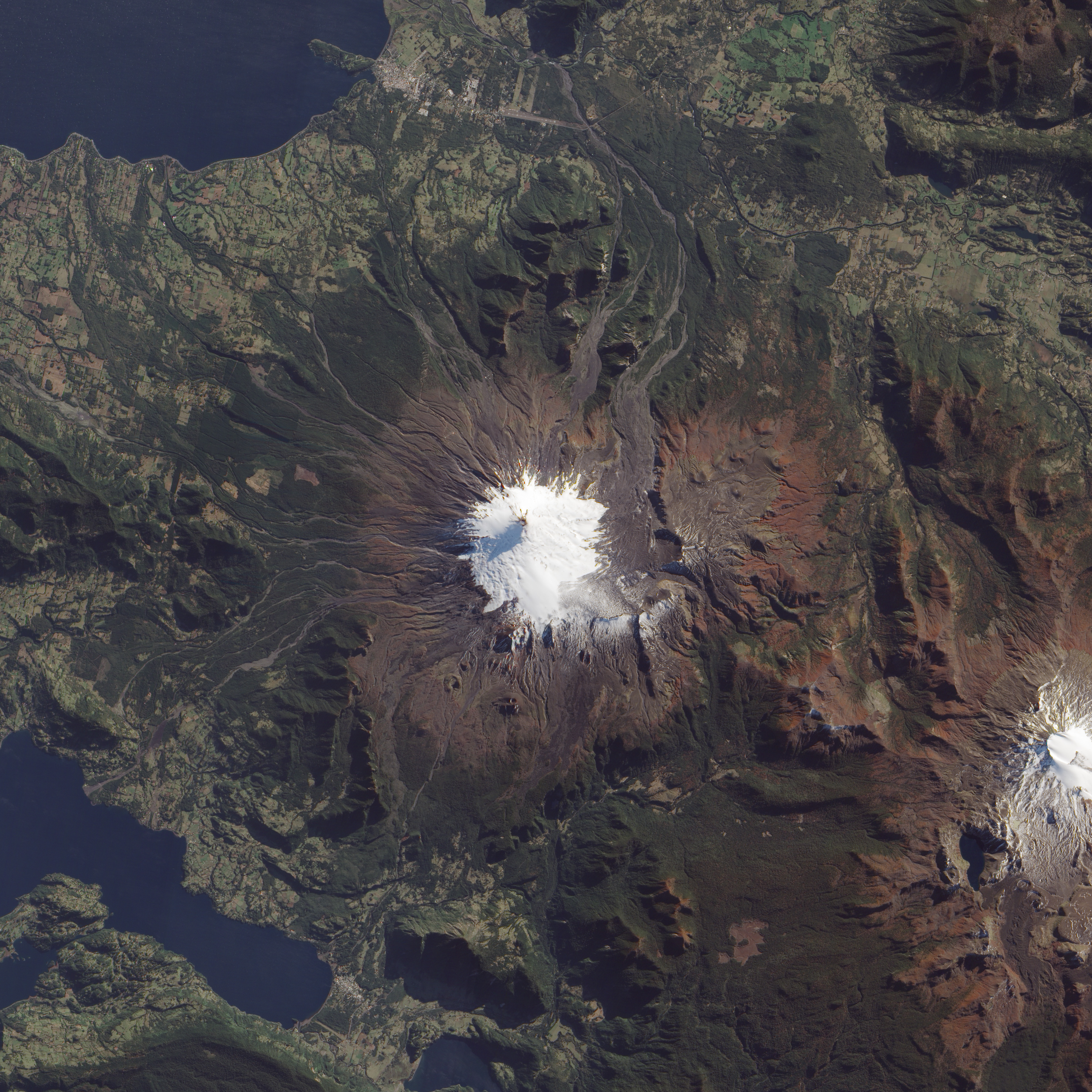
Satellite image of Villarrica

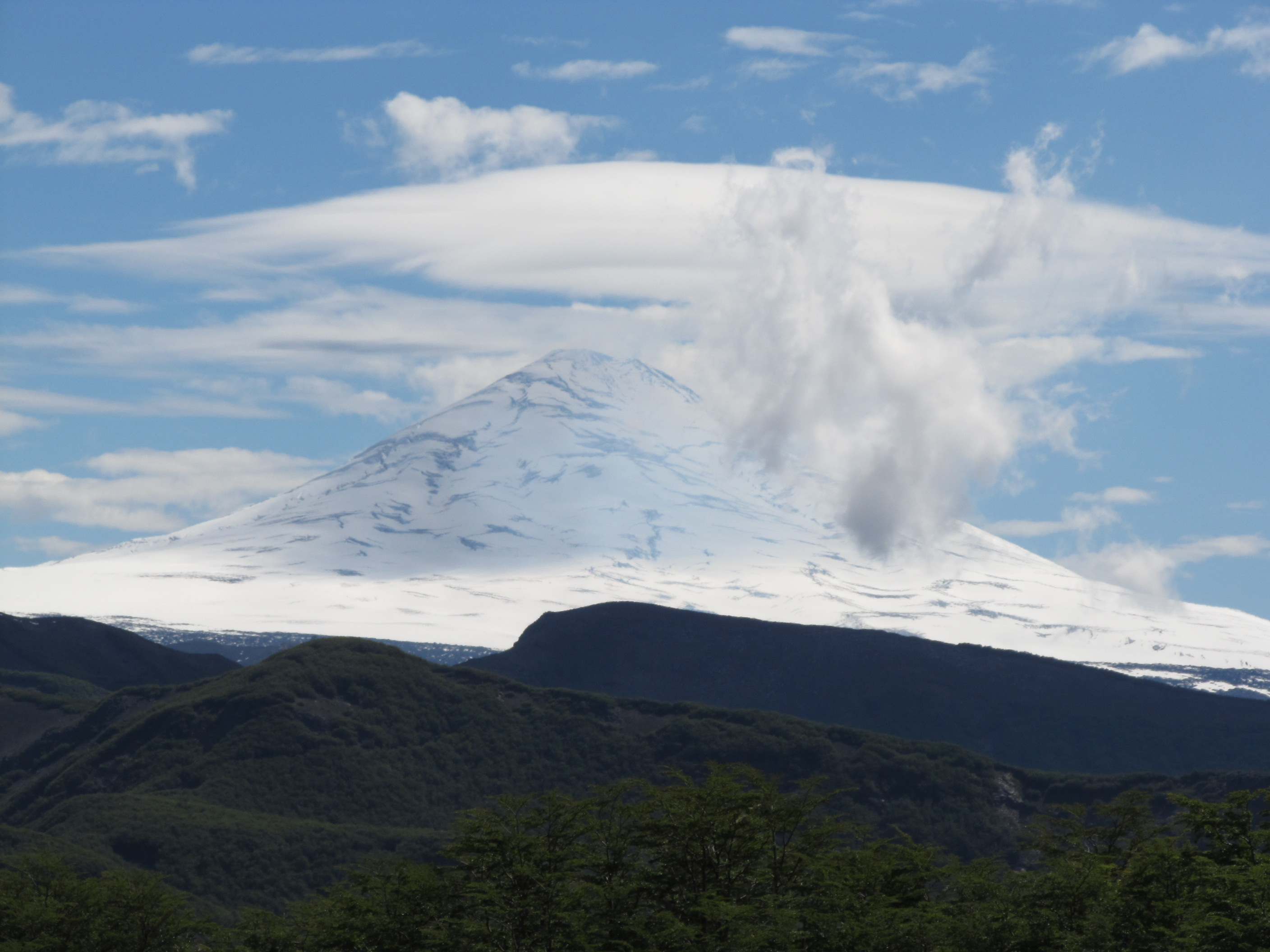
Villarrica

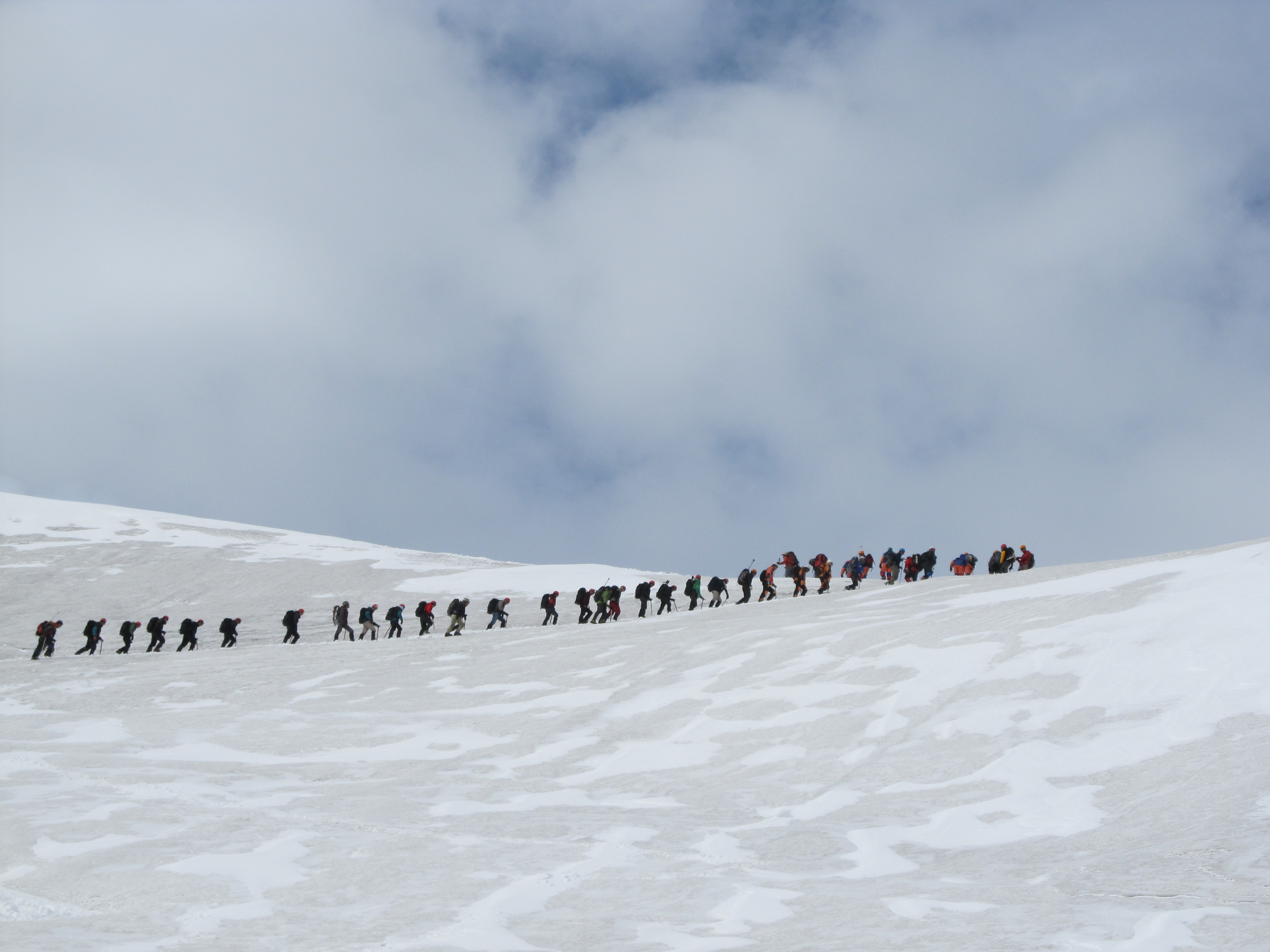
Climbing Villarrica

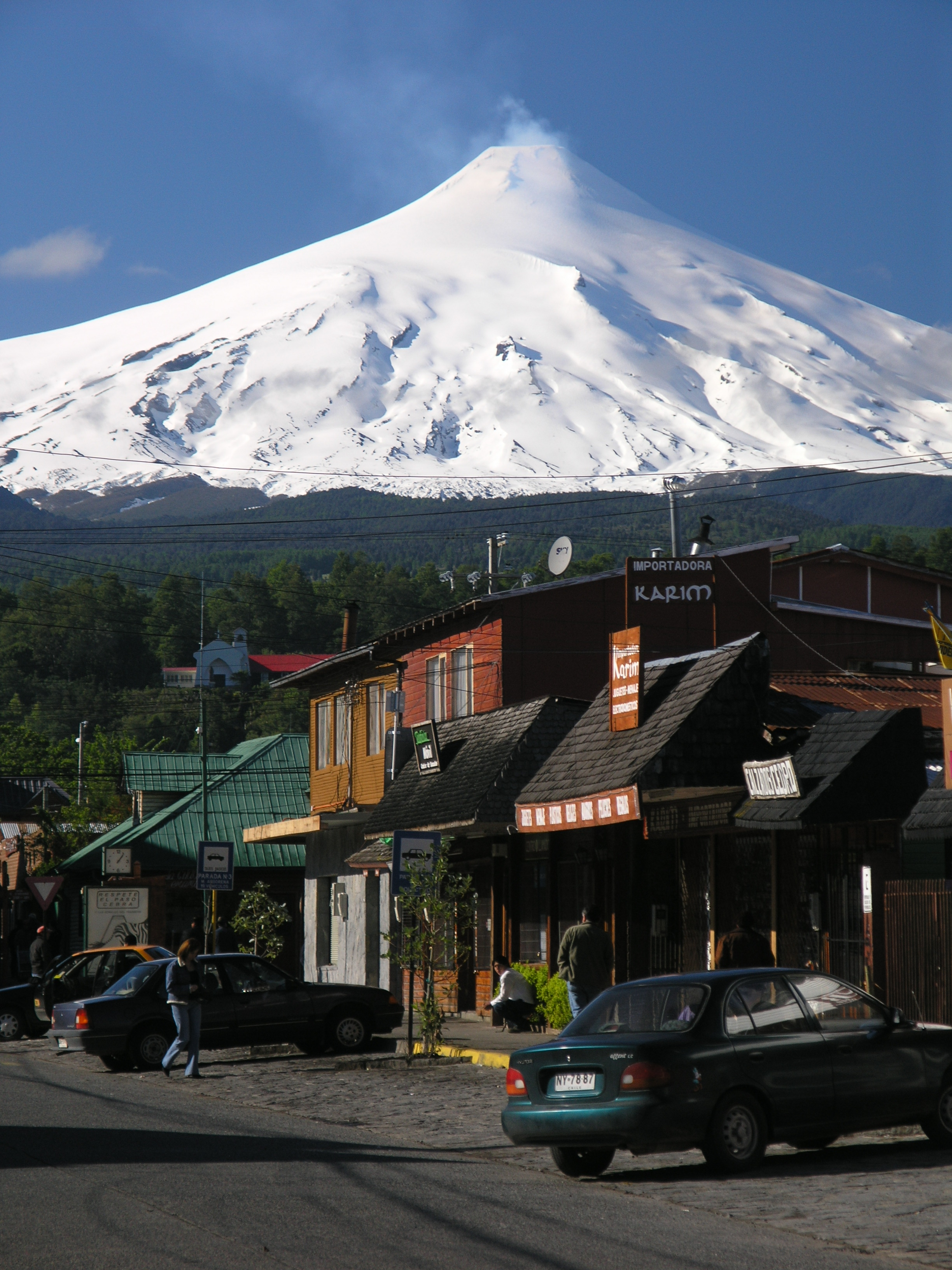
A view from Pucón

== Sources ==
- "Villarrica". Global Volcanism Program. Smithsonian Institution.
- Petit-Breuilh Sepúlveda, María Eugenia (2004). La historia eruptiva de los volcanes hispanoamericanos (Siglos XVI al XX): El modelo chileno (in Spanish). Huelva, Spain: Casa de los volcanes. ISBN 978-84-95938-32-9.
