= Huanquihue Group =

Highest point
- Elevation: 2,139 m (7,018 ft)
- Coordinates: 39°53′S 71°35′W

Geography
- Location: Argentina

Geology
- Mountain type: Stratovolcanoes
- Last eruption: 1750 ± 100 years

The Huanquihue Group (Spanish pronunciation: [waŋˈkiwe]) is a group of young basaltic stratovolcanoes in Argentina near the border with Chile, south of Lanín volcano. The Huanquihue group is located south of Epulafquén Lake, north of Lolog Lake and west of Reigolil-Pirihueico Fault in Chile. Volcanism is associated with the Liquiñe-Ofqui Fault.

Huanquihue volcano itself is eroded, but El Escorial cinder cone has been active in the Holocene. One of its tephras overlies an older formation that was erupted 1400 BP. Lavas from this cone form a peninsula in Lake Epulafquen and modified the local hydrography. Another cinder cone La Angostura formed a peninsula separating the lakes Epulafquen and Huechulafquen. This cone has three craters.

A tephra layer of black trachyandesite has been linked to Huanquihue and is dated 4028-4212 BP. Varve count dating has indicated that tephras in Lake Villarrica and Lake Calafquen erupted presumably in 1591 are compositionally similar to Huanquihue scorias. A VEI-3 eruption of basaltic trachyandesite has been dated at that year. Oral tradition reports the occurrence of an eruption at the end of the 17th century.

== See also ==
- List of volcanoes in Argentina
