= Huechulafquen Lake =

Lake in Neuquén Province, Argentina

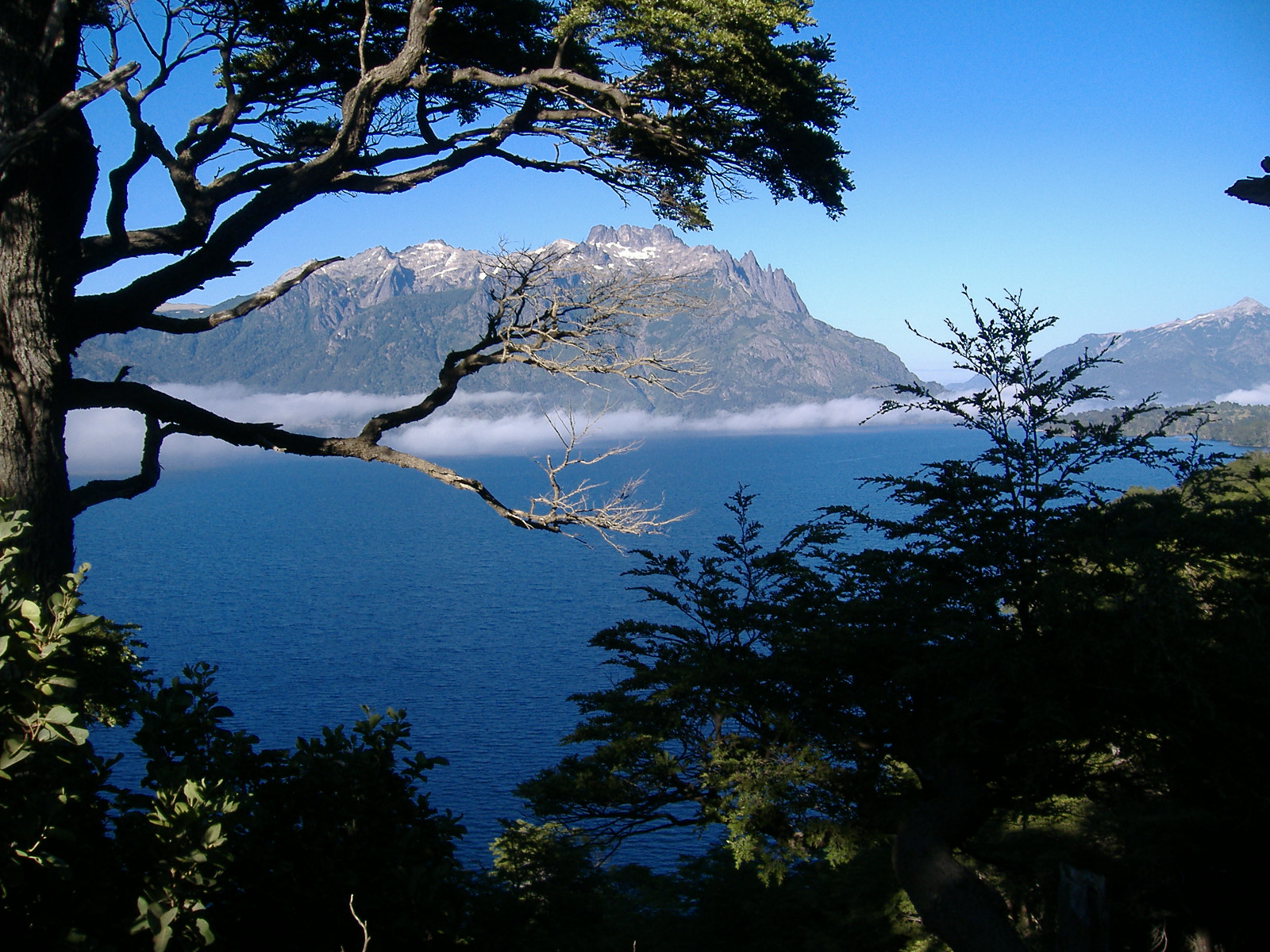

- Location within Argentina
- Location: Huiliches Department, Neuquén Province, Argentina, in Patagonia
- Coordinates: 39°46′12″S 71°22′48″W
- Type: glacial
- Primary outflows: Chimehuin River
- Basin countries: Argentina
- Max. length: 30 km (19 mi)
- Max. width: 5 km (3.1 mi)
- Surface area: 78.2 square kilometres (19,300 acres)
- Average depth: 142 metres (466 ft)
- Water volume: 11.1 cubic kilometres (9,000,000 acre⋅ft)
- Residence time: 4.96 years
- Surface elevation: 875 metres (2,871 ft)

Huechulafquen Lake (Spanish pronunciation: [wetʃuˈlafken]) is a lake in Neuquén Province, Patagonian Argentina. This glacial lake is located in the Andean mountains in Lanín National Park some 25 kilometres from Junín de los Andes and 60 kilometres from San Martín de los Andes. It is one of Argentina's largest Andean lakes and is fed by glaciers and meltwater streams and lakes.

== Description ==
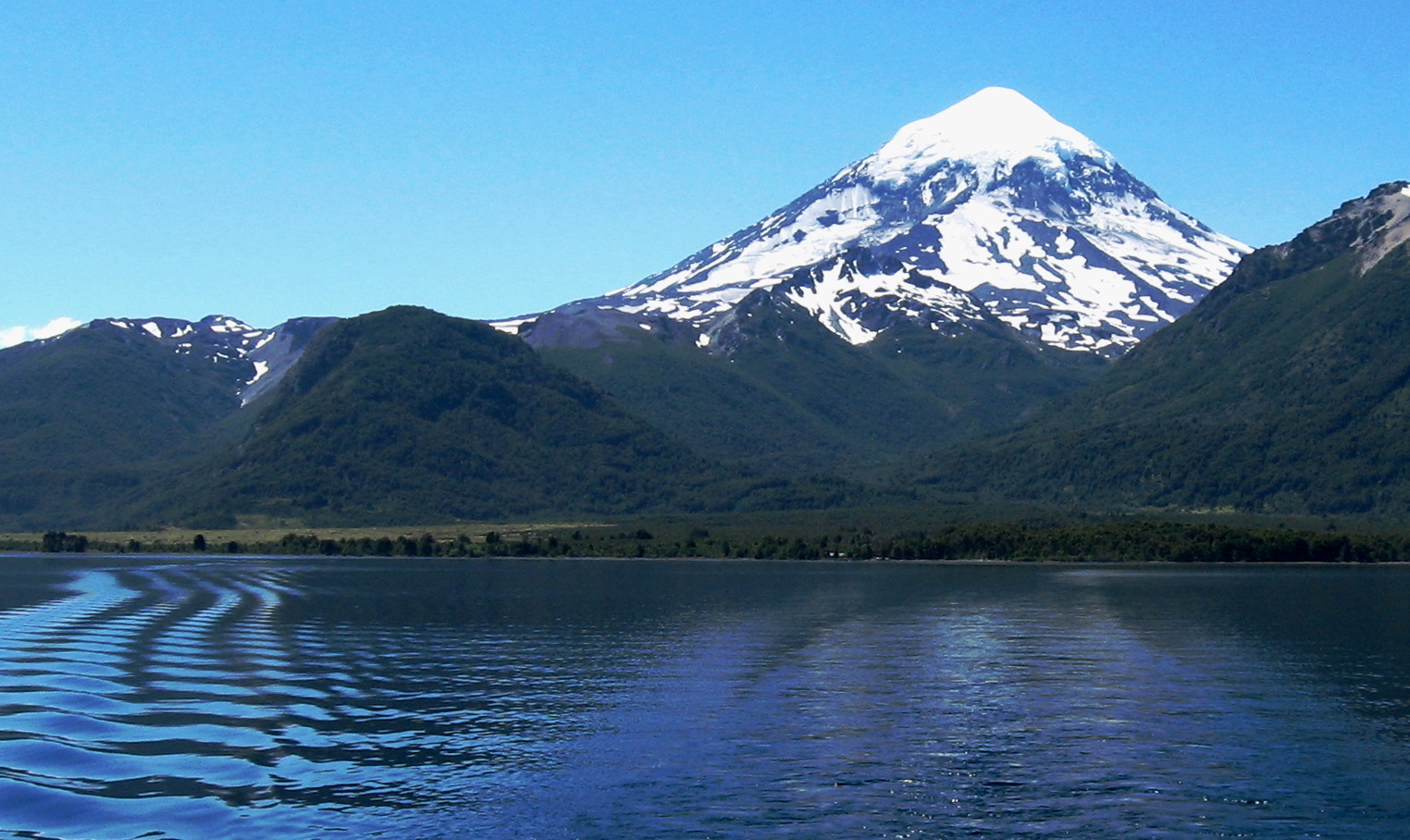
Lanin volcano looms over the northern shore of the Lake Paimún, an arm of Lake Huechulafquen.

The lake's name derives from the Mapuche language and means long lake, an apt name for this 30 kilometres (19 mi) long, 5 kilometres (3.1 mi) wide lake, which has a surface area of 78.2 square kilometres (30.2 sq mi) or 19,300 acres. Lakes Paimún and Epulafquén are connected to the main body of the lake by short, narrow, shallow straits, but are usually considered separate lakes. These two smaller lakes would add about 30 square kilometres (7,400 acres) to the size of Huechulafquen Lake if the three were considered a single lake. The Chimehuin River flows south-eastward out of the lake with its ultimate destination the Atlantic Ocean. Junin de los Andes is the nearest city.

Lake Paimún, 11 kilometres (6.8 mi) long, is the northern arm of Huechulafquen Lake. Lanin volcano at 3,740 metres (12,270 ft), the highest mountain in the region, looms over its northern shore. Lake Paimun is fed by glaciers originating on Lanin volcano and by small streams that originate at the border with Chile.

Lake Epulafquén, 7 kilometres (4.3 mi) long, is the southern arm of the lake. A complex of volcanoes, the Huanquihue Group, 2,139 metres (7,018 ft) in elevation, rise above its southern shore. About 1800 CE, a lava flow from one of the volcanic cones reached the southern shore of the lake causing a rocky, distorted delta. A short, turbulent stream brings the waters of two additional lakes, Lake Curruhué, 12 kilometres (7.5 mi) long, and Green Lake, 1 kilometre (0.62 mi) long, into Lake Epulafquén. Another short stream feeds into Lake Epulafquén from Lake Carilafquén, 1 kilometre (0.62 mi) long. Hot springs and thermal baths are located near the shores of this lake.

Huechulafquen runs in an east–west direction, with marked climatic changes along its shores as annual precipitation decreases from about 4,000 millimetres (160 in) in the higher mountains overlooking the lake to about 1,400 millimetres (55 in) at the eastern end of the lake. Most of the precipitation falls in the southern hemisphere winter.

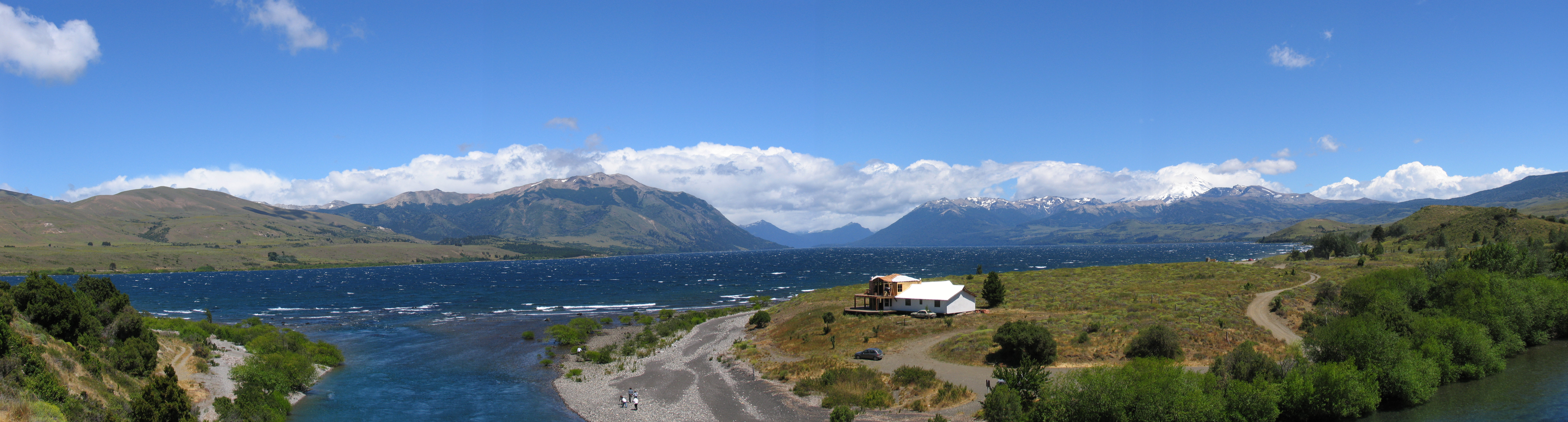
The Chimehuin River flows out of the eastern end of Huechulafquen Lake.

== Tourism ==
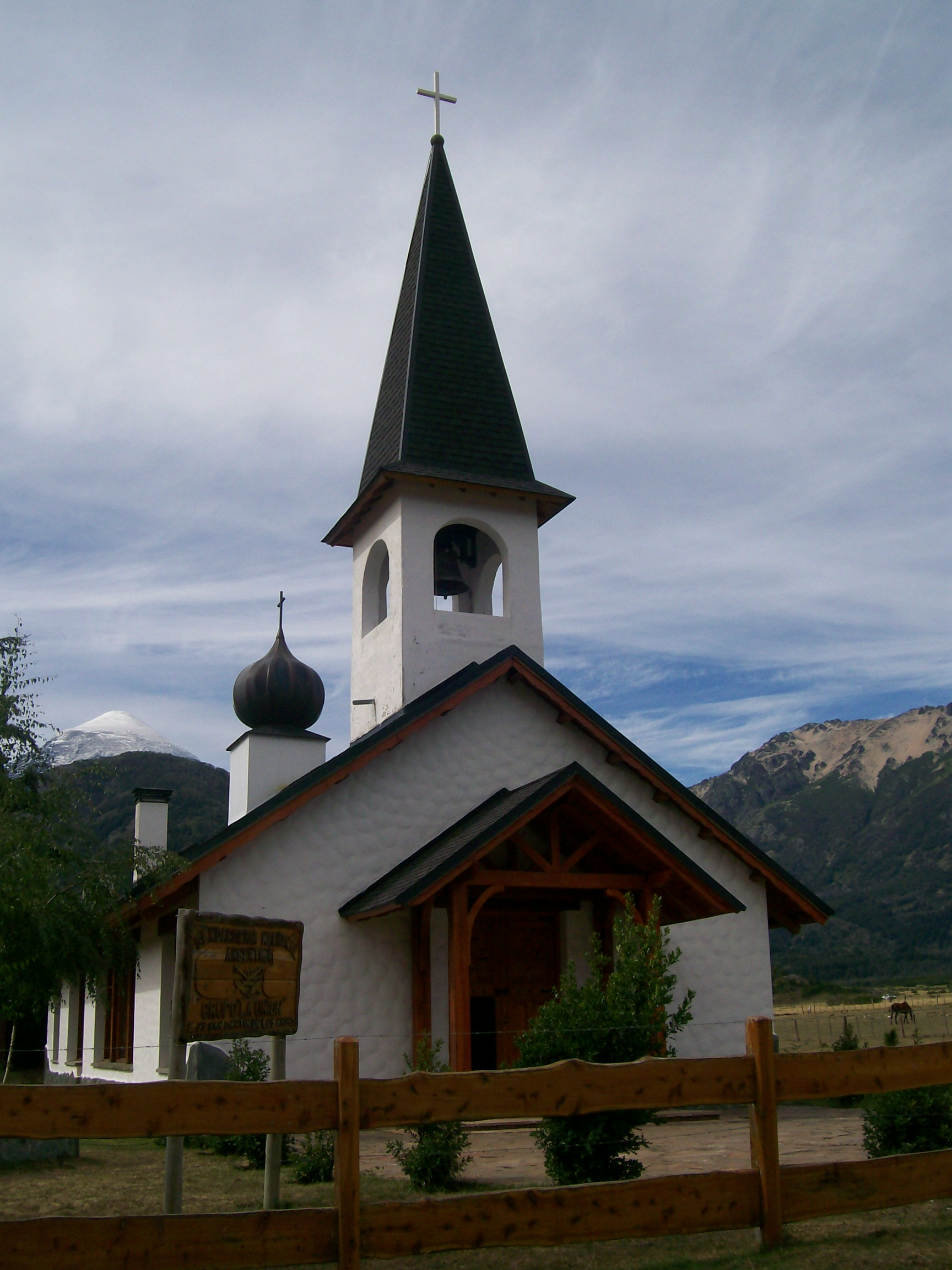
The Maria Auxiladora chapel on Lake Paimun.

Lake Huechulafquen is a popular tourist destination for camping, hiking, boating, climbing Lanin volcano, and fishing for rainbow and brown trout, species introduced to Argentine in the early 1900s. A road runs along the north shore of the lake, passing through several communities of the Mapuche people, who live within the boundaries of Lanin National Park. Another road touches along the southern shoreline of Lake Epulaufquén providing access to the volcanic flows there. This road continues westward, crossing into Chile at the Carirriñe Pass, elevation 1,223 metres (4,012 ft).
