= Lolog Lake =

- Lago Lolog (Spanish)
- Location within Argentina
- Location: Neuquén, Argentina
- Coordinates: 40.031°S 71.423°W
- Type: glacial lake
- Max. depth: 200 m (660 ft)
- Surface elevation: 899 m (2,949 ft)

Lolog Lake (Spanish: Lago Lolog) is a glacial lake located in the department of Neuquén, in Argentina.

The lake can be accessed by two roads that connect it to the nearby cities Junín de los Andes and San Martín de los Andes.

This lake is a prestigious zone for trout fishing.
