= Collón Curá Department =

Coordinates: 40°02′54″S 70°04′30″W

Collón Curá
- Department
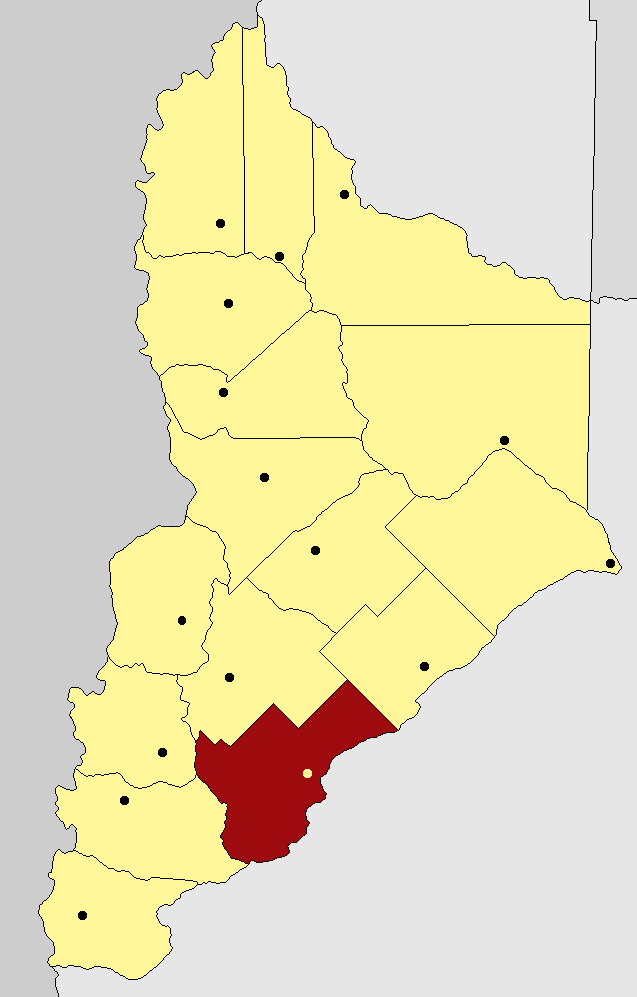
- Country: Argentina
- Province: Neuquén
- Capital: Piedra del Águila

Area
  - Total: 5,730 km^{2} (2,210 sq mi)

Population (2022)
  - Total: 4,835
  - Density: 0.844/km^{2} (2.19/sq mi)
- Important cities: Piedra del Águila: Bajada Colorada; Santo Tomás (Neuquén); Villa Pichi Picun Leufu; Villa Rincon Chico; Sañico; San Ignacio (Neuquén)

Collón Curá is a department located in the southeast of Neuquén Province, Argentina.

== Geography ==
The department limits with Catán Lil Department at north, Picún Leufú Department at northeast, Rio Negro Province at east and southeast, Lácar Department at southwest and Huiliches Department at northwest.
