= Las Coloradas =

Las Coloradas may refer to:

- Las Coloradas, Argentina, settlement in Argentina
- Las Coloradas, Yucatán, settlement in Mexico
