= Junín de los Andes =

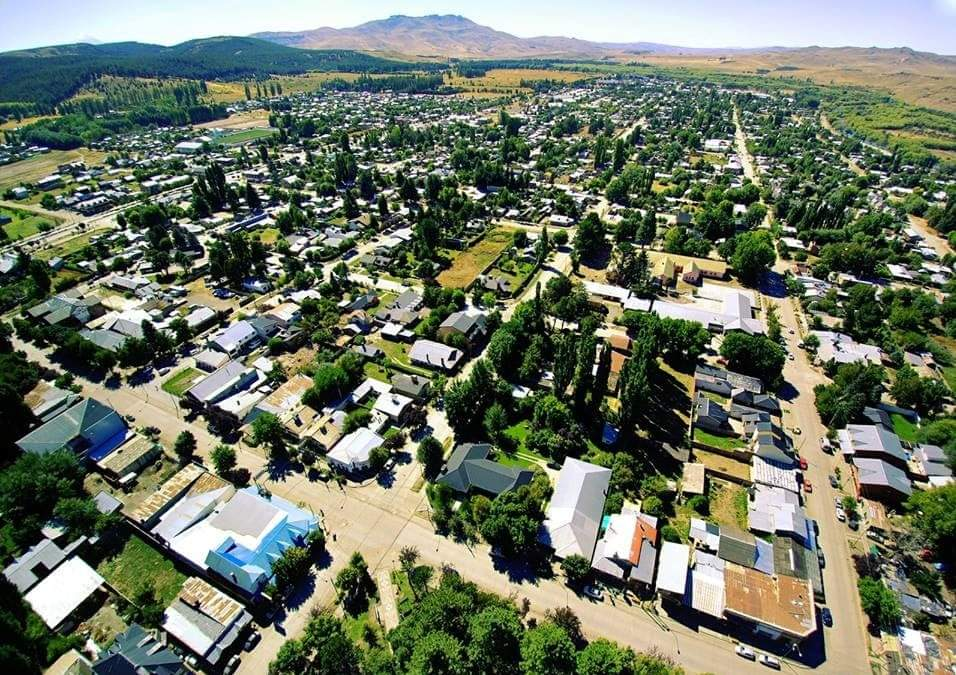
- Panoramic view of the city

- Location within Neuquén Province Location within Argentina
- Coordinates: 39°55′S 71°04′W
- Country: Argentina
- Province: Neuquén
- Department: Huiliches
- Founded: February 15, 1883

Government
  - Mayor: Rubén Enrique Campos
- Elevation: 902 m (2,959 ft)

Population (2010 census [INDEC])
  - Total: 13,086
- Time zone: UTC−3 (ART)
- CPA Base: Q 8371
- Area code: +54 02972
- Climate: Csb
- Website: www.junindelosandes.gov.ar

Junín de los Andes is a first category municipality and administrative center of the Huiliches Department in the province of Neuquén, Argentina. It is located in the south of the province, by the Chimehuin River, on National Route 40, about 35 km (22 mi) north of San Martín de los Andes and 17 km (11 mi) from the Chapelco Airport, which services the area.

Founded in 1883 as a fortress during the Conquest of the Desert, it is the oldest town in the province. It developed as a cattle border town. A mixture of the native Mapuche people's and the Argentine pioneers' influence can be seen in the local culture. Over the years, it became a tourism center near the Lanín National Park and the surrounding Andean lakes. In spring and summer, it is a common place for birdwatching, fishing and other outdoor activities, being considered Argentina's national trout fishing capital.

== History ==
The Huiliches area was populated in the pre-Hispanic times. Prior to the expansion of the Argentine state into Patagonia at the end of the 19th century, the Mapuche and Tehuelche hunting and gathering tribes coexisted in the region.

In 1882, the Argentine Army first reached the near area of the current village after heavy fighting with the natives. A fortress was erected to secure the position. Commander Senior Sergeant Agustín Bernardo was said to have picked the location of the fortress and is considered the founder of the village. The next year an expedition was carried out from there to the valley of the Chimehuin river to found the settlement. The military authorities originally wanted to name it General Frías, but ultimately changed it to Junín de los Andes, inspired by the Aymara vocable hunins, meaning pasture.

During the initial years, the settlement functioned as a military outpost. Salesian priests Domingo Milanesa and Juán Ruggerone arrived in 1892. They worked evangelizing the natives and contributed by opening the Salesian house with two schools for the children. Over the years, the settlement developed into a cattle town with the influx of newly arrived pioneers. It was designed in a grid plan with a central square and country houses distributed across its wide streets. Some of the first buildings were built during these years: the original parish church in 1893, was demolished in 1925 due to poor building conditions, the post office opened in 1900. The first developing committee of the Huiliches Department was formed in 1924. The town was declared a municipality by national decree Nº 17.425 in 1945.

== Geography ==
Junín de los Andes lies on the left bank of the Chimehuín River, in a depression in the northern Patagonian Andes. The surrounding territory is divided into three landscape zones: the east, characterized by plateau basalt with its fluvial valleys, formed by wind erosion, where mountains and small hills are seen; the center, which is a valley glacier area with rivers and creeks and their mallín-vegetated banks; and the west, where the volcanoes such as the Lanín (3,776 metres (12,388 ft) above sea level) and lakes prevail.

Metamorphic rocks from to the Precambrian are found in the region. On its basement lie more recent minerals, such as vulcanites, covering glaciofluvial sediments and elements formed by effusion in the quaternary age. There is a prominent network of bodies of water near town, including glacial lakes Huechulafquen, Epulafquén and Tromén. They are complemented by rivers, such as Aluminé, Quilquihue and Malleo.

=== Climate ===
Junín de los Andes is classified within warm-summer Mediterranean climate (Köppen: Csb). It is located at the foot of the Andes and near the lakes, conditioning the generally temperate climate. The Huiliches Department is considered Summer range from mild to warm with daily temperatures between 20 °C and 30 °C, dropping to 5 °C and 10 °C in the night. The town receives most of its precipitations in the cold months of winter from May to July. The average annual rainfall is 2000 mm.

Climate data for Junín de los Andes, Neuquén
Month	Jan	Feb	Mar	Apr	May	Jun	Jul	Aug	Sep	Oct	Nov	Dec	Year
Mean daily maximum °C (°F)	23.4 (74.1)	23 (73)	19.4 (66.9)	14 (57)	9.1 (48.4)	5.2 (41.4)	4.5 (40.1)	6.2 (43.2)	9.6 (49.3)	13.2 (55.8)	17.1 (62.8)	20.6 (69.1)	13.8 (56.8)
Daily mean °C (°F)	16.2 (61.2)	16 (61)	13 (55)	8.6 (47.5)	4.9 (40.8)	1.9 (35.4)	0.9 (33.6)	2.1 (35.8)	4.3 (39.7)	7.4 (45.3)	10.7 (51.3)	13.8 (56.8)	8.3 (46.9)
Mean daily minimum °C (°F)	9.6 (49.3)	9.9 (49.8)	7.7 (45.9)	4.5 (40.1)	1.9 (35.4)	−0.6 (30.9)	−1.7 (28.9)	−1 (30)	0.3 (32.5)	2.6 (36.7)	5.1 (41.2)	7.7 (45.9)	3.8 (38.9)
Average relative humidity (%)	49.0	51.0	59.0	69.0	81.0	85.0	83.0	79.0	73.0	66.0	58.0	52.0	67.1
Source: Climate Data.org

=== Flora and fauna ===
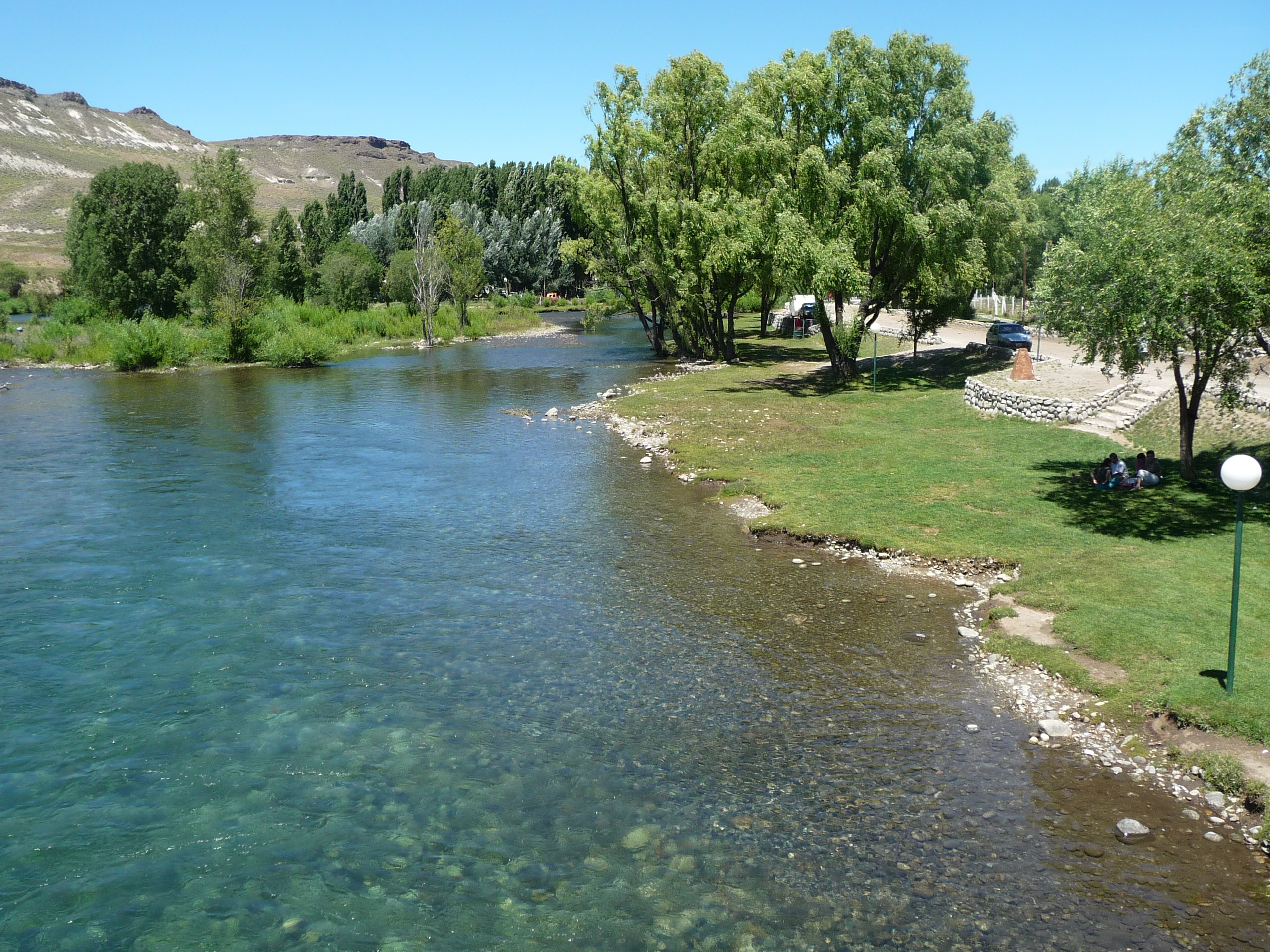
Chimehuín river

The Huiliches Department has a scenic environment typical of the northern Patagonic Andes, characterized by its vegetated hill slopes. The region features the Andean Patagonian fores and Patagonic steppe ecoregions. The local flora include Araucaria araucanas, trees of the Nothofagus species such as the coihues and Patagonian oaks, and Andean cypresses.

A variety of fauna can be found in the region, conditioned by its mountain environment, lakes and rivers. Most of the local species inhabit the national parks and are protected from hunting with a few exceptions. The South Andean deer, Andean fox and pudú are among the mammals. The Andean Condor, Black-chested buzzard-eagle and Southern lapwing can be found within the bird species. The rich aquatic ecosystem is represented by Neotropical silversides, Aplochiton taeniatus, perches and different kinds of trout, such as rainbow and brown trout, among others.

== Demographics ==
In the census of 2010 there were a total of 13,086 residents in town. In 1970 the population was 3,944 people. The next censuses showed a total of 7,395 (1991) and 10,592 (2001) inhabitants, respectively.

== Economy ==
The economy of the Huliches Department is mainly based on tourism and fruit farming. Junín de los Andes is considered a traditional cattle farming area within the province, hosting the Neuquén Rural Society and its annual exposition since 1942. The Lanín National Park among other natural attractions make the region a destination for trekking, hiking and other outdoor activities. Given the excellent fishing possibilities in the Chimehuín river and the near located lakes, the village is known as Argentina's national sport trout-fishing capital, offering services for the activity.

== Landmarks and local culture ==
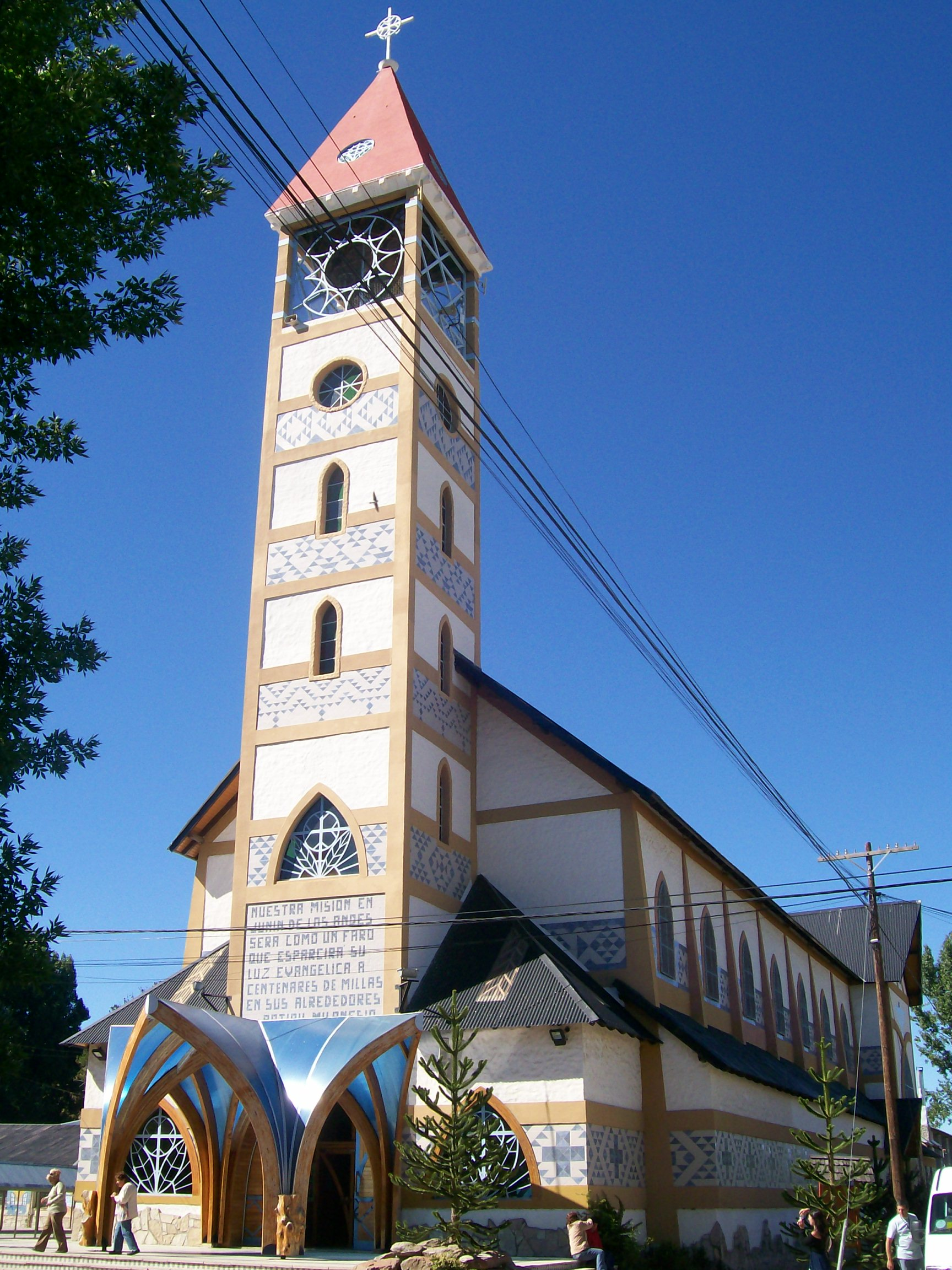
The Our Lady of las Nieves church

The traces of Mapuche culture and Argentine pioneers tradition, to which the town owes its origins can be found in everyday life in artistic expressions and their inhabitants. The local Vía Christi Catholic-themed park on the Cerro de la Cruz ("Hill of the Cross"), depicting elements of both, represents the strong religious faith feeling of the locals. Over the years, the Government promoted the keeping of the native culture, including the village in the Mapuche touristic trail of the province or founding the Mapuche cultural center.

The Our Lady of las Nieves church is located at the town center. It is dedicated to the Chilean-born Blessed Laura Vicuña, who lived in Junín de los Andes in 1904. The building contains Gothic architecture elements, such as a rib vault and is adorned by Mapuche looms on the walls. The altar is held on four rocks from the Huechulafquen lake, representing religious believes from all cultures.

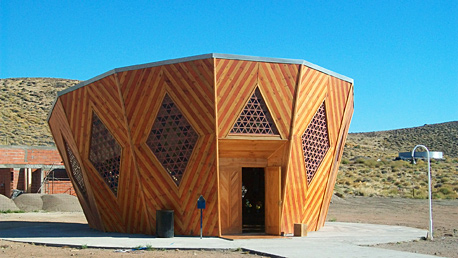
Ceferino Namuncurá Sanctuary in San Ignacio

The remains of beatified young Mapuche Ceferino Namuncurá rest on the foot of a hill in the small village San Ignacio, located nearly 60 km from Junín de los Andes. The sanctuary was designed as a giant cultrun drum with wooden walls, sheet steel roofing and rhombus-shaped windows with multicolor glass. It is recognized as a pilgrimage point within the Neuquén province.

The María Auxiliadora del Paimún chapel is located on the foot of the Lanín volcano, on the coast of the Paimún lake. It contains an image of Mary Help of Christians, the Patroness of Patagonia. The chapel has two towers, one of them with onion dome and a 400 kg bronze and tin bell. The interior atrium depicts images of the three periods of the evangelisation process in the Neuquén province. The altar is made of Patagonian cypress wood.

Some of the historical buildings dating back to the early years of Junín de los Andes, such as the first post office (1901) are still on foot. The San Martín square, which was designed as the central town square in the first city map of 1897, and officially inaugurated in 1950 under its current name, is decorated by the typical araucaria trees of the Neuquén province. Additionally, the Municipal Museum and Historical Archive offers more information on the region's history.

=== Regular events ===
Junín de los Andes is home to some regular yearly events related to its culture. As a significant cattle center within the province, the Junín Rural Expo, celebrated every January at the Neuquén Rural Society is considered one of the most important rural events in the Argentine Patagonia. The Camp Tender Festival, held in February, also celebrates the rural traditions, depicting jineteada, Argentine folk-music and other aspects of the gaucho lifestyle. The National Trout Festival, a fishing contest and festival with food stands, music shows and fishing-related activities that attracts fishermen from Neuquén and other provinces, takes place in November.

== Transportation ==
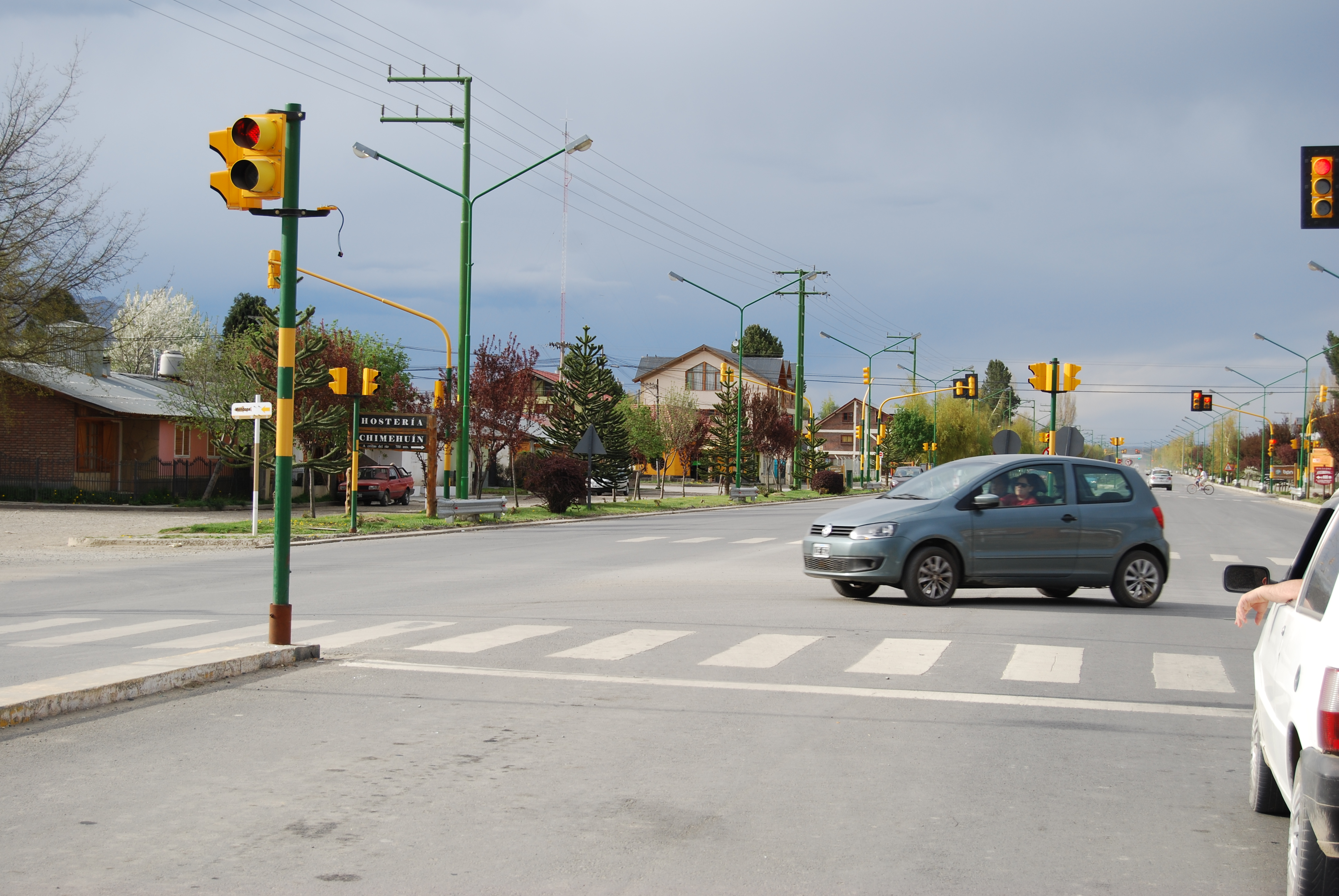
Main street

The National Route 40 runs north–south through the city, connecting it with Zapala to the north and San Martín de los Andes to the south. The Provincial Route 23 running south from near Pino Hachado Pass ends at the junction with NR40 north of town. The Provincial Route 61 connects the town with lake Huechulafquén. From Junín de los Andes it is possible to cross to Chile using Mamuil Malal Pass (through Provincial Route 60), Carirriñe Pass (63 km west of town through Provincial Route 62) and Hua Hum Pass (via San Martín de los Andes).

Long- and medium-distance bus services connect Junín de los Andes with other points in the Neuquén province and the rest of Argentina through its bus terminal. The Aviador Carlos Campos Airport located near San Martín de los Andes with regular flights to Buenos Aires is the main airport in the southern Neuquén province. Within the town the public transportation is represented by a bus network.
