= Epulafquén Lake =

- Location within Argentina
- Location: Huiliches Department, Neuquén Province, Patagonia
- Coordinates: 39°47′59″S 71°33′19″W
- Type: Glacial lake
- Primary outflows: Huechulafquen Lake
- Basin countries: Argentina
- Max. length: 7 km (4.3 mi)
- Max. width: 2 km (1.2 mi)
- Surface elevation: 895 m (2,936 ft)

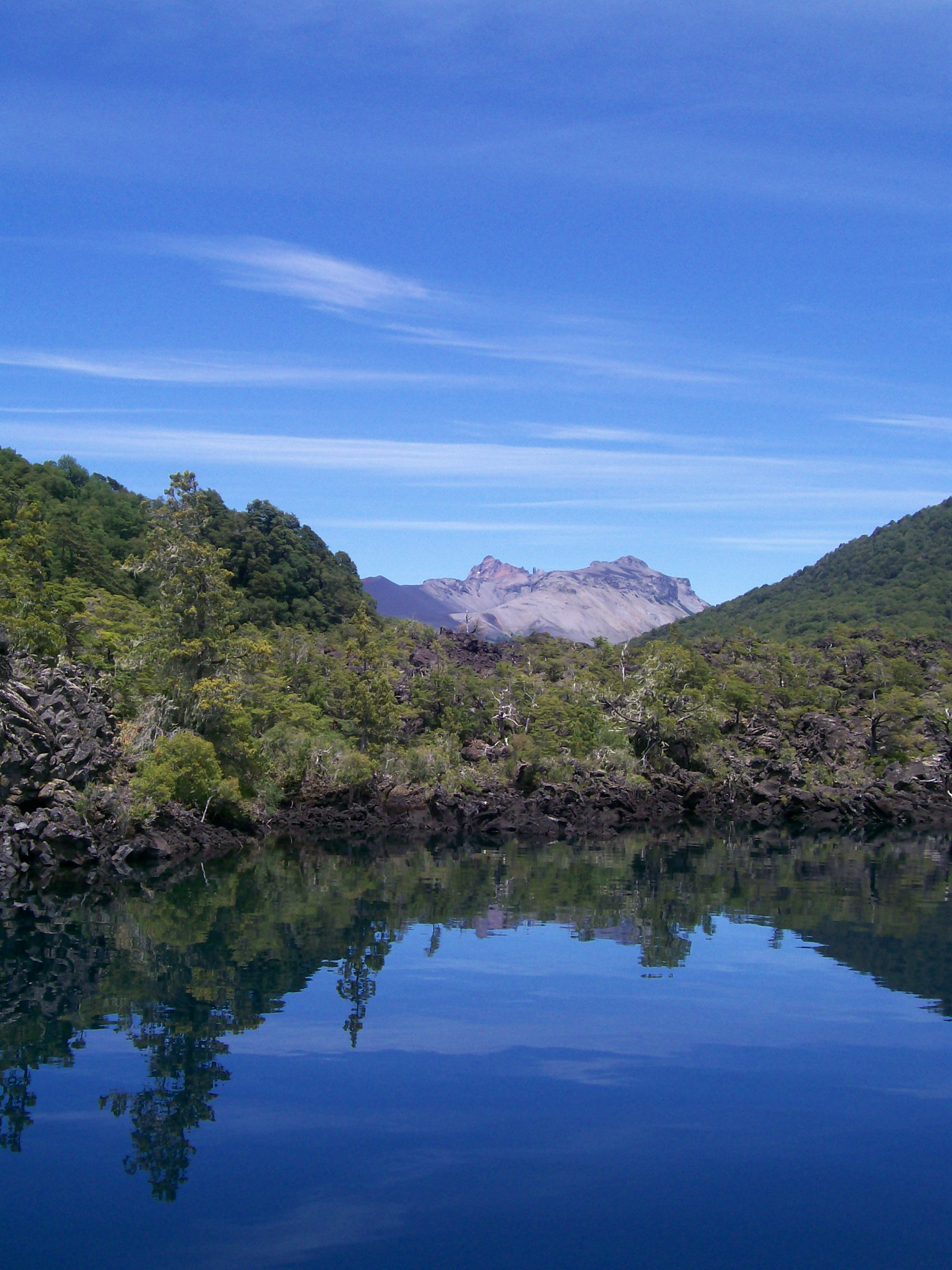
Volcanic scree, Lake Huechulafquen

Epulafquén Lake (Spanish pronunciation: [epuˈlafken]) is a lake in Neuquén Province, Patagonian Argentina. This glacial lake is located in the Andean mountains in Lanín National Park. Hydrologically it forms one lake together with Huechulafquen Lake and is then considered an arm of it. It is separated from Huechulafquen Lake by a small channel formed due to the emergence of a small volcanic cone during the Holocene. One of the lake's most prominent features is a large delta-formed lava flow from Huanquihue volcano on its southern shore.
