= Aviador Carlos Campos Airport =

Aviador Carlos Campos Airport Aeropuerto de Chapelco
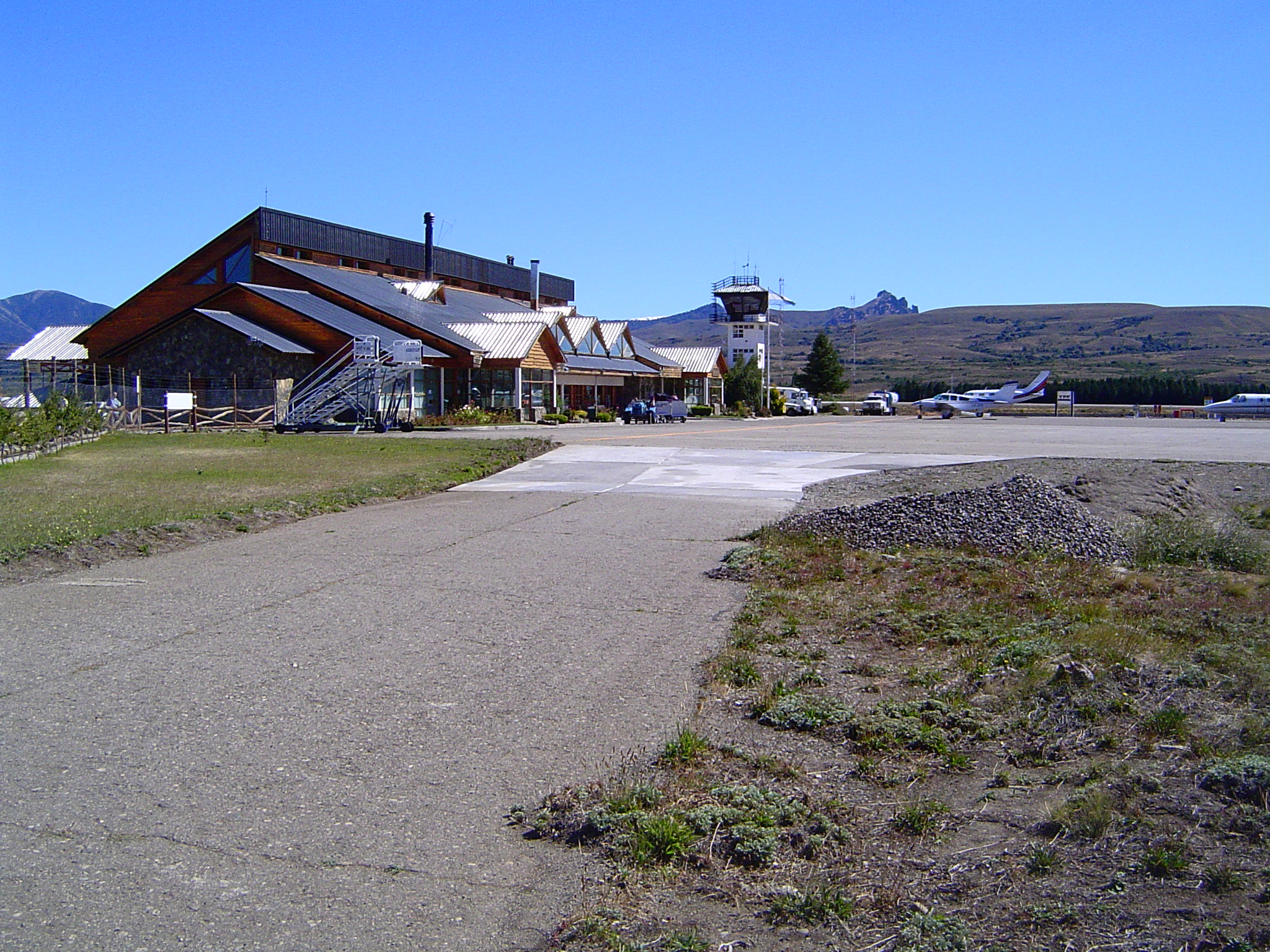
- IATA: CPC; ICAO: SAZY

Summary
- Airport type: Public
- Operator: Government and Aeropuertos del Neuquén
- Serves: San Martín de los Andes, Argentina
- Location: Chapelco
- Elevation AMSL: 2,569 ft (783 m)
- Coordinates: 40°04′30″S 71°08′10″W

Map
- Location of airport in Argentina

Runways
Direction	Length		Surface
Direction	m	ft	Surface
06/24	2,500	8,202	Asphalt
- Source: WAD GCM

Aviador Carlos Campos Airport (Spanish: Aeropuerto de Chapelco - Aviador Carlos Campos, IATA: CPC, ICAO: SAZY) is an airport in Neuquén Province, Argentina, serving the cities of San Martín de los Andes and Junín de los Andes. It was built in 1981. It operates daily between 12:00 and 21:00 (Local Time). In 2007, this airport handled almost 30,000 passengers.

== Airlines and destinations ==
Airlines	Destinations
Aerolíneas Argentinas	Buenos Aires–Aeroparque; Seasonal: Buenos Aires–Ezeiza
American Jet	Neuquén
JetSmart Argentina	Buenos Aires–Aeroparque, Buenos Aires–Ezeiza

== See also ==
- Transport in Argentina
- List of airports in Argentina
