= Las Coloradas, Argentina =

Las Coloradas
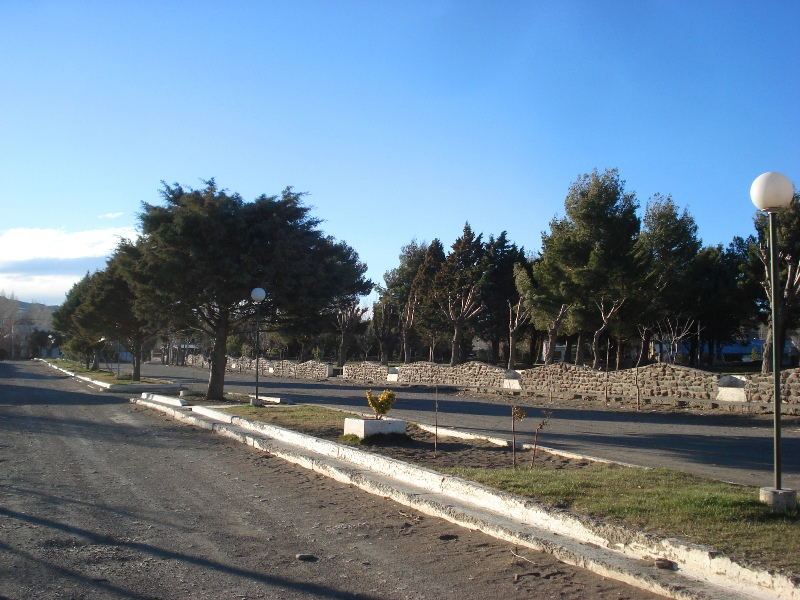
- Central Square

- Location within Neuquén Province Location within Argentina
- Coordinates: 39°32′S 70°34′W
- Country: Argentina
- Province: Neuquén Province
- Department: Catán Lil Department
- Founded: October 26, 1926

Government
  - Mayor: Milton Edgardo Díaz (MPN)
- Elevation: 974 m (3,196 ft)

Population (2001 census [INDEC])
  - Total: 833
- Time zone: UTC−3 (ART)
- CPA Base: Q 8341
- Area code: +54 0242
- Climate: Csb
- Website: Las Coloradas Municipality

Las Coloradas is a third category municipality of the Catán Lil Department in the south-east of the province of Neuquén, Argentina. It is the only municipality in the department, hence serving as its administration seat. Connected to the rest of the Province only through Provincial Road 24, away from bigger urban centers, it is characterized by a state of relative isolation.

The economy is based on livestock farming with some commercial activity in the urbanized area. Educational institutions up to high school and some job qualification centers oriented to the Province's interior labor market are available. Health care is provided by Doctor Carlos Potente Hospital.

The Mapuche population is represented in town as well as in its area of influence with some communities settled there.

== History ==
Beginning in the early 20th century, Las Coloradas was a settlement within the homonymous livestock establishment, where the magistrate's court and the police station worked. It was officially founded and declared the administration seat of the Catán Lil Department on 26 October 1926.

There are different versions regarding the town's name Las Coloradas ("The Red Ones"). One of them states that it was named after the red color of Hereford cattle that was imported into the area when the livestock establishment opened.

== Geography ==
Las Coloradas is the only municipality in the Catan Lil Department in the south-east of the province of Neuquén. It lies on Provincial Road 24, which intersects with National Route 40, connecting it with Zapala to the north and Junín de los Andes to the south. Due to the poor road conditions of Provincial Road 24 and its remote location away from urban centers, the region experiences relative isolation.

The town is surrounded by mountains and the Catán Lil River flows next to it. The Garganta del Diablo ("The Devil's Throat"), an over 150 meter-long canyon through which the Catán Lil River flows, is one of the area's main tourist attractions.

== Demographics ==
In 2016, the town had a total of 1,776 residents. Previously, official national censuses showed a total of 294 (1980), 651 (1991) and 833 (2001) inhabitants, respectively.

=== Mapuche settlements ===
There are some Mapuche communities in the rural areas of the Catan Lil Department such as Namuncurá, Ram and Cayulef, all connected to the town through country roads. The Hue Che Foundation works in the town, supporting native communities in the central part of the province of Neuquén, focusing on social-educational aspects.

== Economy ==
The local economy is based on livestock farming. There is also commercial activity within the municipality. For years, the lack of companies in the area and the extremely low volume of production have created high unemployment and low wages.

== Education and health care ==
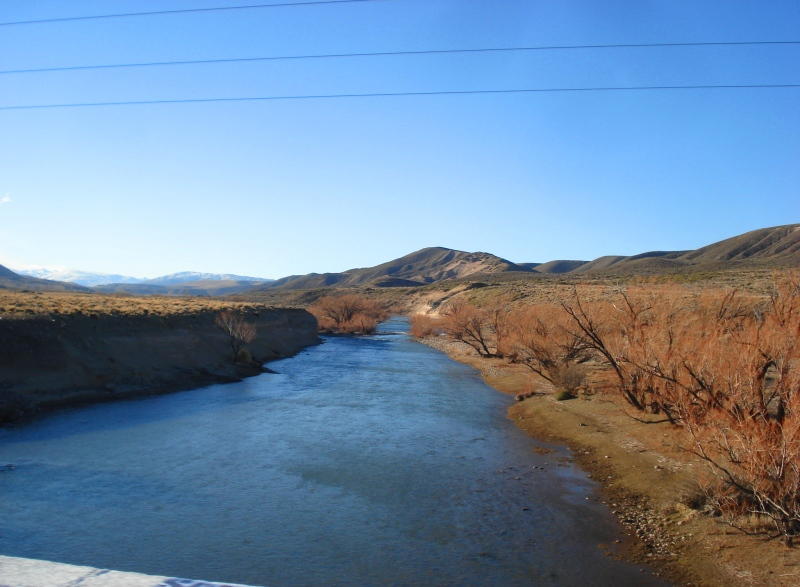
Catán Lil river near Las Coloradas

The education is provided from kindergarten to high school level with the public N°88 Elementary and CPEM N°75 high school. As of 2010, there were some schools in the rural areas, however the CPEM N°75 has been for years the only high school in the department, receiving students from the surrounding area. The Hueche foundation offers them accommodation in the Provincial Shelter for education.

Additionally, there is the Professional Formation Center N°24 "Hueche", offering a range of job qualifications oriented to the provincial labor market. Since 1987, the Agricultural Education Center (C.E.A.) N°1 "Las Coloradas" supports the development of the rural economy.

The Doctor Carlos Potente Hospital is located in the municipality and covers the IV Sanitary Zone within the Province's division areas for health care, with other minor centers located in the department.
