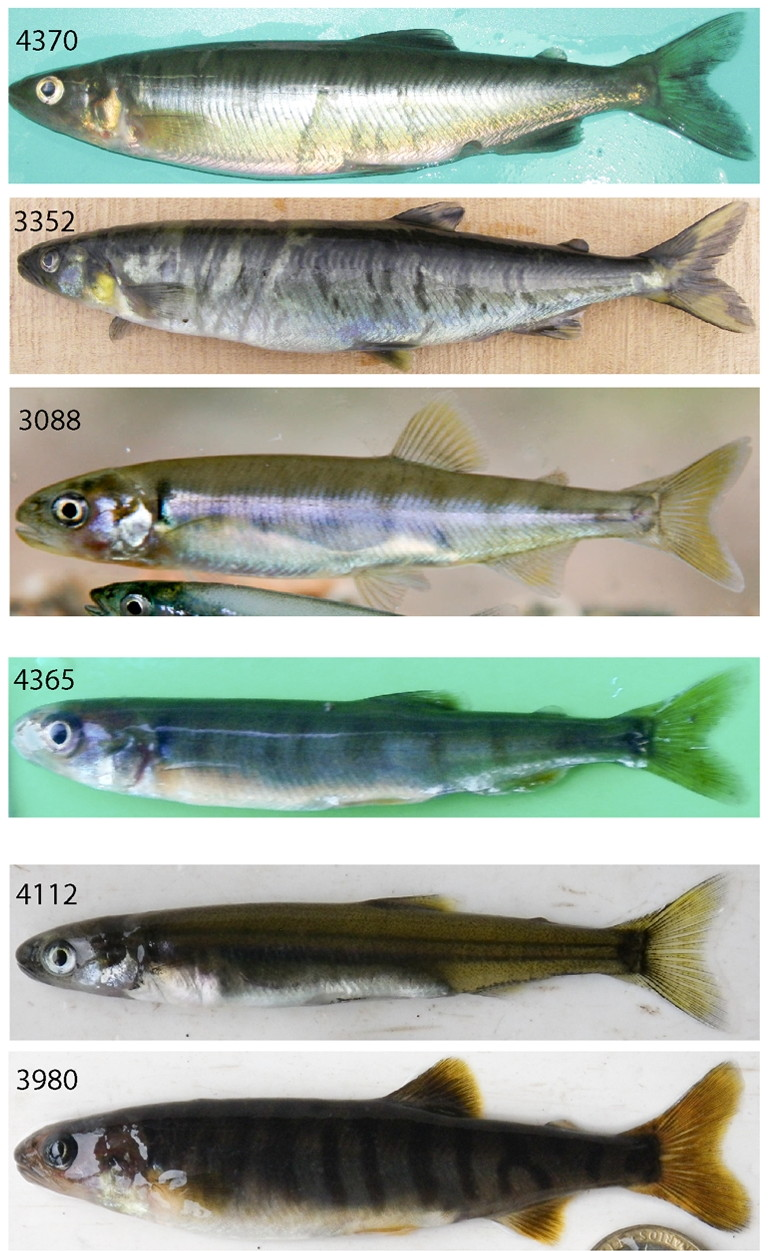

Scientific classification
- Kingdom: Animalia
- Phylum: Chordata
- Class: Actinopterygii
- Division: Teleostei
- Order: Galaxiiformes
- Family: Galaxiidae
- Subfamily: Aplochitoninae
- Genus: Aplochiton; Jenyns, 1842

Species
- See text
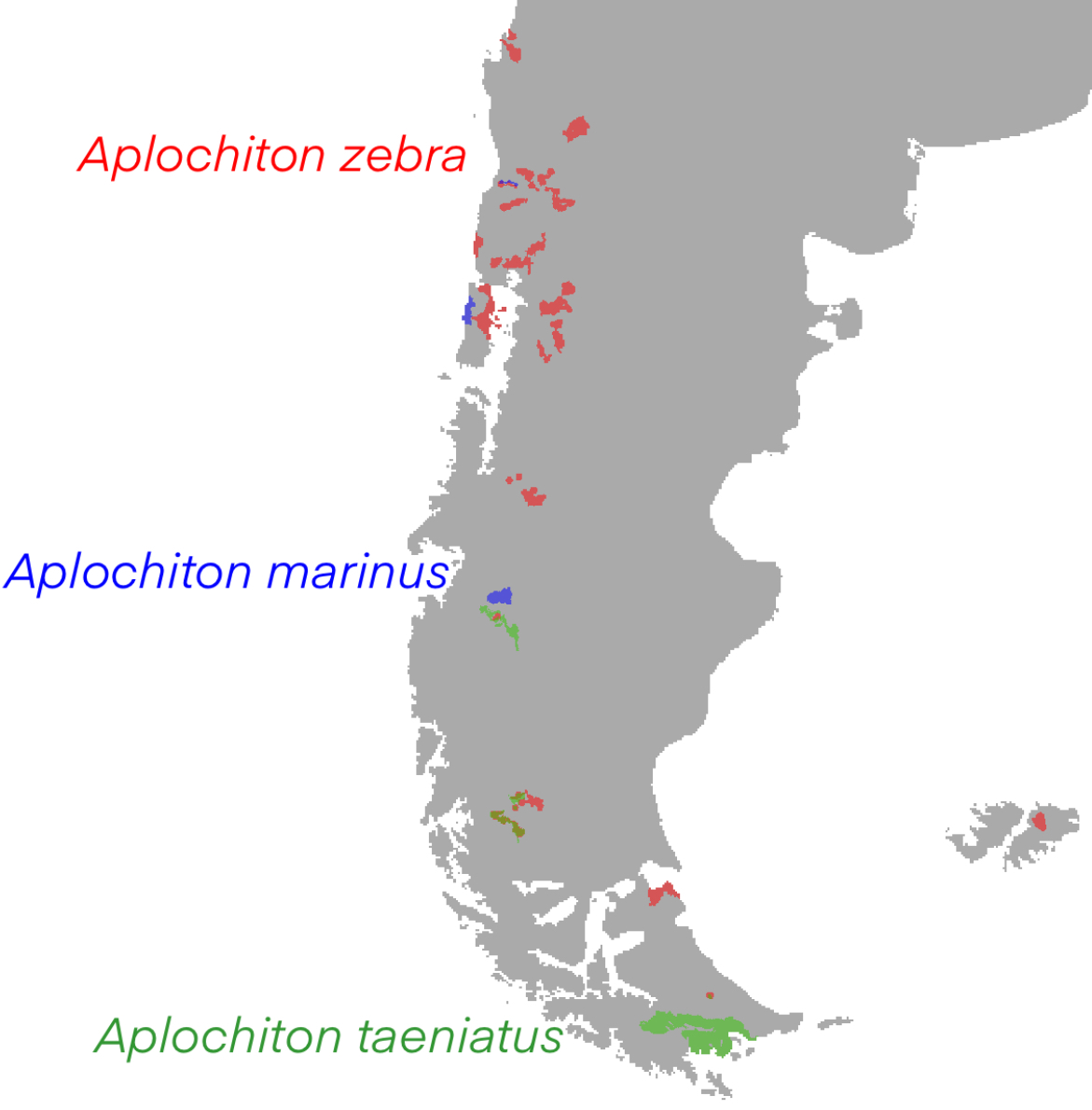

= Aplochiton =

Genus of ray-finned fishes

Aplochiton is a genus of ray-finned fish of the family Galaxiidae native to Argentina, Chile and the Falkland Islands.

== Species ==
FishBase lists three recognized species in this genus:

- Aplochiton marinus C. H. Eigenmann, 1928
- Aplochiton taeniatus Jenyns, 1842
- Aplochiton zebra Jenyns, 1842
