= Aplochiton marinus =

Conservation status
- Vulnerable (IUCN 3.1)

Scientific classification
- Kingdom: Animalia
- Phylum: Chordata
- Class: Actinopterygii
- Order: Galaxiiformes
- Family: Galaxiidae
- Genus: Aplochiton
- Species: A. marinus

Binomial name
- Aplochiton marinus C. H. Eigenmann, 1928
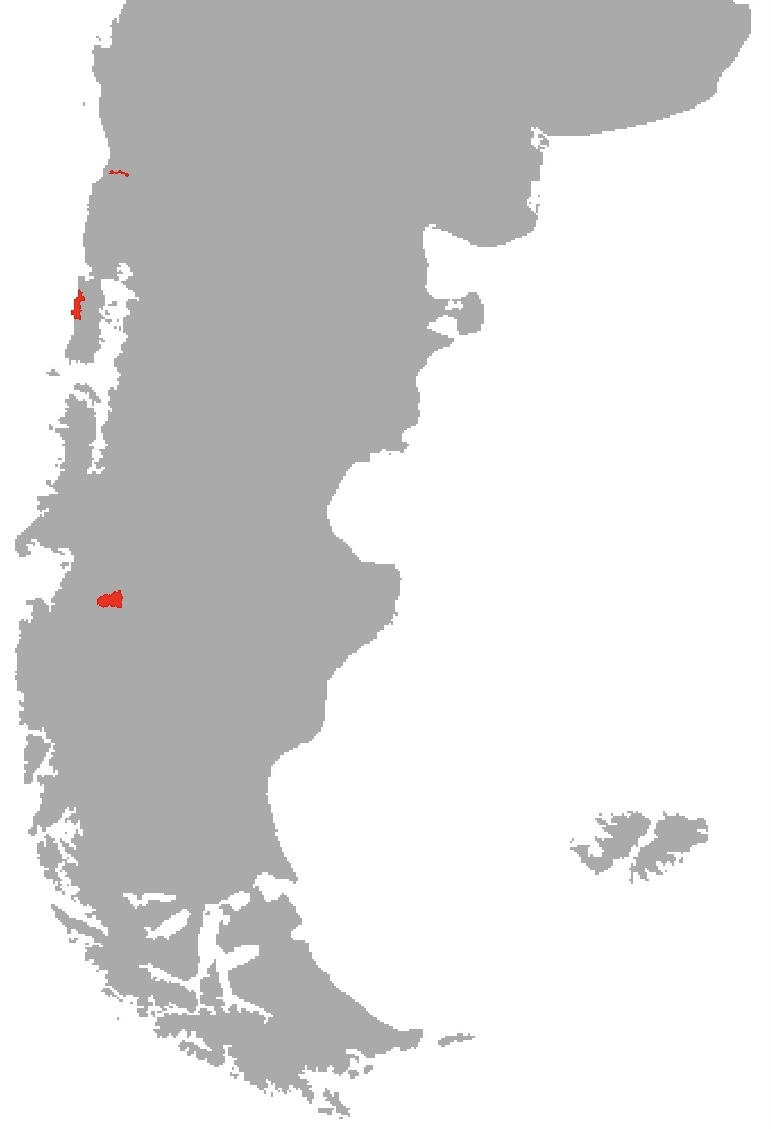

Species of ray-finned fish

Aplochiton marinus is a species of ray-finned fish in the family Galaxiidae. It is an amphidromous fish migrating between ocean and fresh water.

A. marinus is endemic to Chile. The species has previously been synonymised with A. taeniatus but was confirmed as a full, valid species in 2013.
