= Reigolil-Pirihueico Fault =

The Reigolil-Pirihueico Fault (Spanish: Falla Reigolil-Pirihueico) is a second-order geological fault located in the Chilean and Argentine Andes. As the name implies, it runs from Pirihueico Lake to Reigolil Valley. Reigolil-Pirihueico Fault run in north–south direction and is roughly parallel to the larger Liquiñe-Ofqui Fault, which is located 15 to 20 km west of it to which it is considered a branch of. East of Reigolil-Pirihueico Fault, close or along the Argentina-Chile boundary, are a string of volcanoes pliocene to quaternary volcanoes: Lanín, Pirihueico, Huanquihué, Quelguenco and Chihuío.

Geographically the fault is mostly inside two Chilean communes, Panguipulli and Curarrehue. Settlements above the fault include the hamlet of Puerto Pirihueico and the town of Curarrehue.
