= Catán Lil Department =

Coordinates: 39°33′24″S 70°35′38″W

Catán Lil
- Department
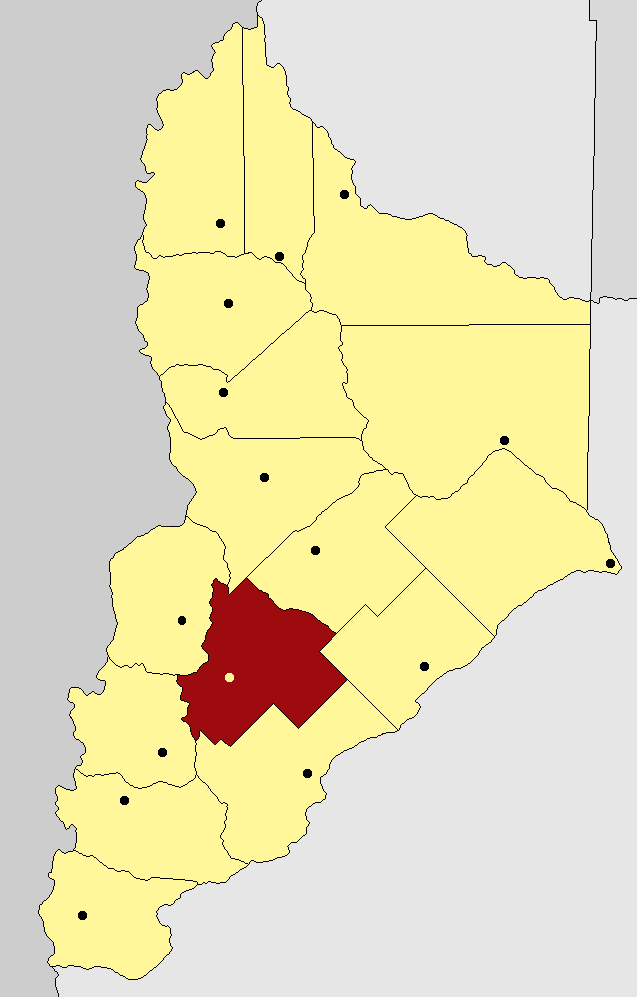
- Country: Argentina
- Province: Neuquén
- Capital: Las Coloradas

Area
  - Total: 5,490 km^{2} (2,120 sq mi)

Population (2022)
  - Total: 2,676
  - Density: 0.487/km^{2} (1.26/sq mi)
- Important cities: Las Coloradas: Chacayco Sur; Ojo de Agua; Las Cortaderas; Fortin 1º de Mayo; El Marucho; Picun Leufu (Catan Lil); Pilolil; Catan Lil; La Picaza; El Sauce

Catán Lil is a department located in the center of Neuquén Province, Argentina.

== Geography ==
The Department limits with Picunches Department at north, Zapala Department at northeast, Picún Leufú Department at east, Collón Curá Department at southeast, Huiliches Department at southwest and Aluminé Department at northwest.
