= Lácar Department =

Coordinates: 40°09′24″S 71°21′09″W

Lácar
- Department
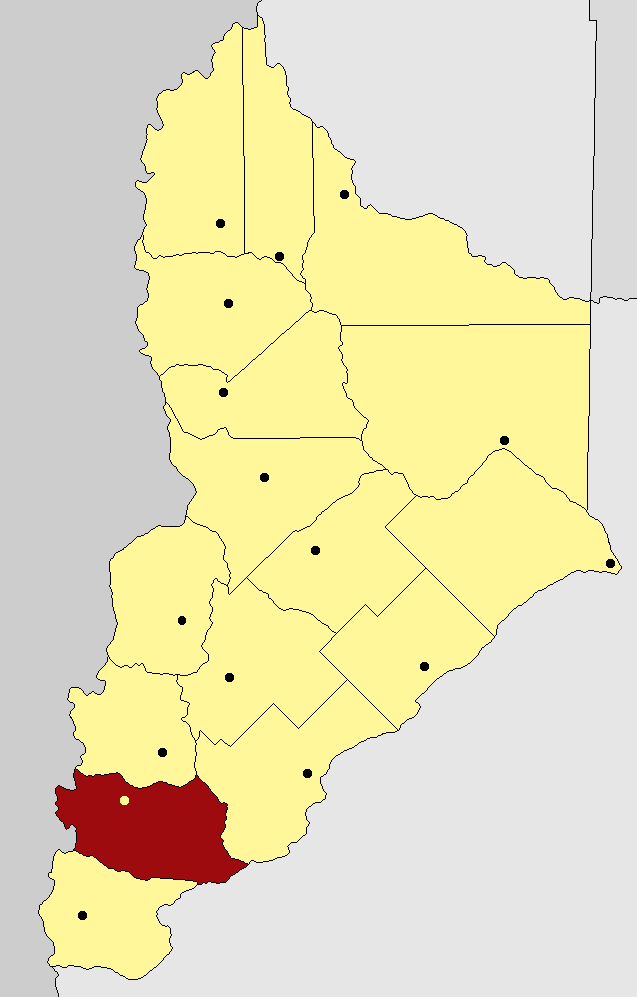
- Country: Argentina
- Province: Neuquén
- Capital: San Martín de los Andes

Area
  - Total: 4,930 km^{2} (1,900 sq mi)

Population (2022)
  - Total: 39,596
  - Density: 8.03/km^{2} (20.8/sq mi)
- Important cities: San Martín de los Andes; Chimehuin; Paso de Los Indios; Puerto Hua Hum; Quila Quina; Vega Maipu; Lolog; Lago Hermoso; Caleufu

Lácar is a department located in the south of Neuquén Province, Argentina.

== Geography ==
The department is bounded by Huiliches Department to the north, Collón Cura Department to the northeast, Rio Negro Province to the southeast, Los Lagos Department to the south, and Chile to the east.
