= Reigolil River =

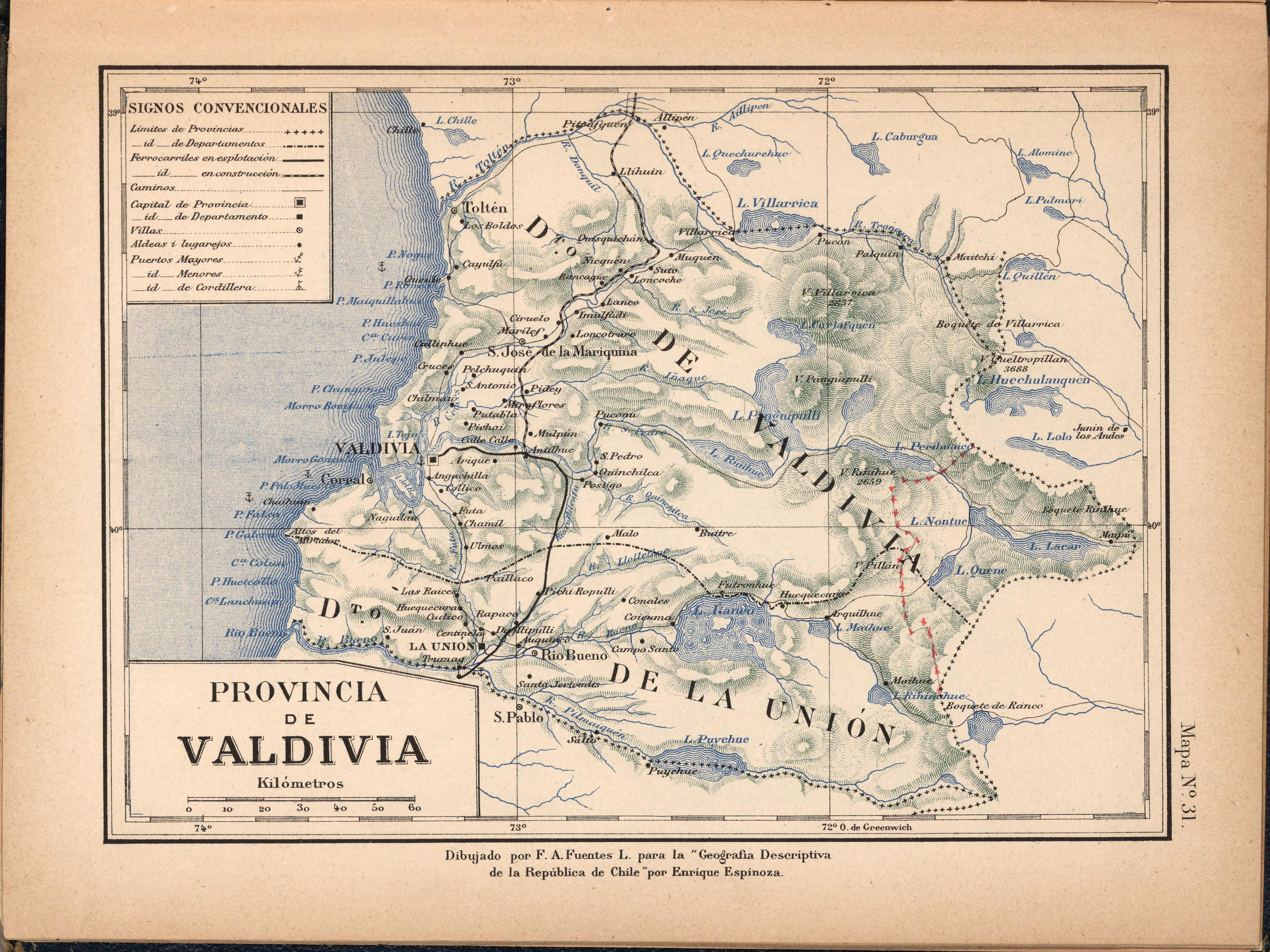
- Trancura River, east of Villarica Lake in a 1903 map

Location
- Country: Chile

Physical characteristics
- Mouth
  - location: Trancura River

Reigolil River (Spanish: Río Reigolil, Spanish pronunciation: [rejˈɣolil]) is the main tributary to Trancura River in La Araucanía Region, Chile. Reigolil River flows from north to south following the Reigolil-Pirihueico Fault. The river has a catchment area that includes the southern slopes of Sollipulli Volcano in the north and a large portion of land east of Huerquehue National Park.

== See also ==
- List of rivers of Chile
