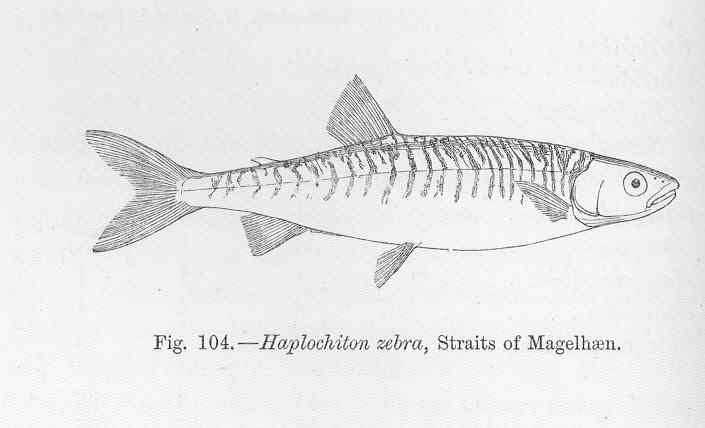
- A sketch of Aplochiton zebra

Conservation status
- Least Concern (IUCN 3.1)

Scientific classification
- Kingdom: Animalia
- Phylum: Chordata
- Class: Actinopterygii
- Division: Teleostei
- Order: Galaxiiformes
- Family: Galaxiidae
- Genus: Aplochiton
- Species: A. zebra

Binomial name
- Aplochiton zebra Jenyns, 1842
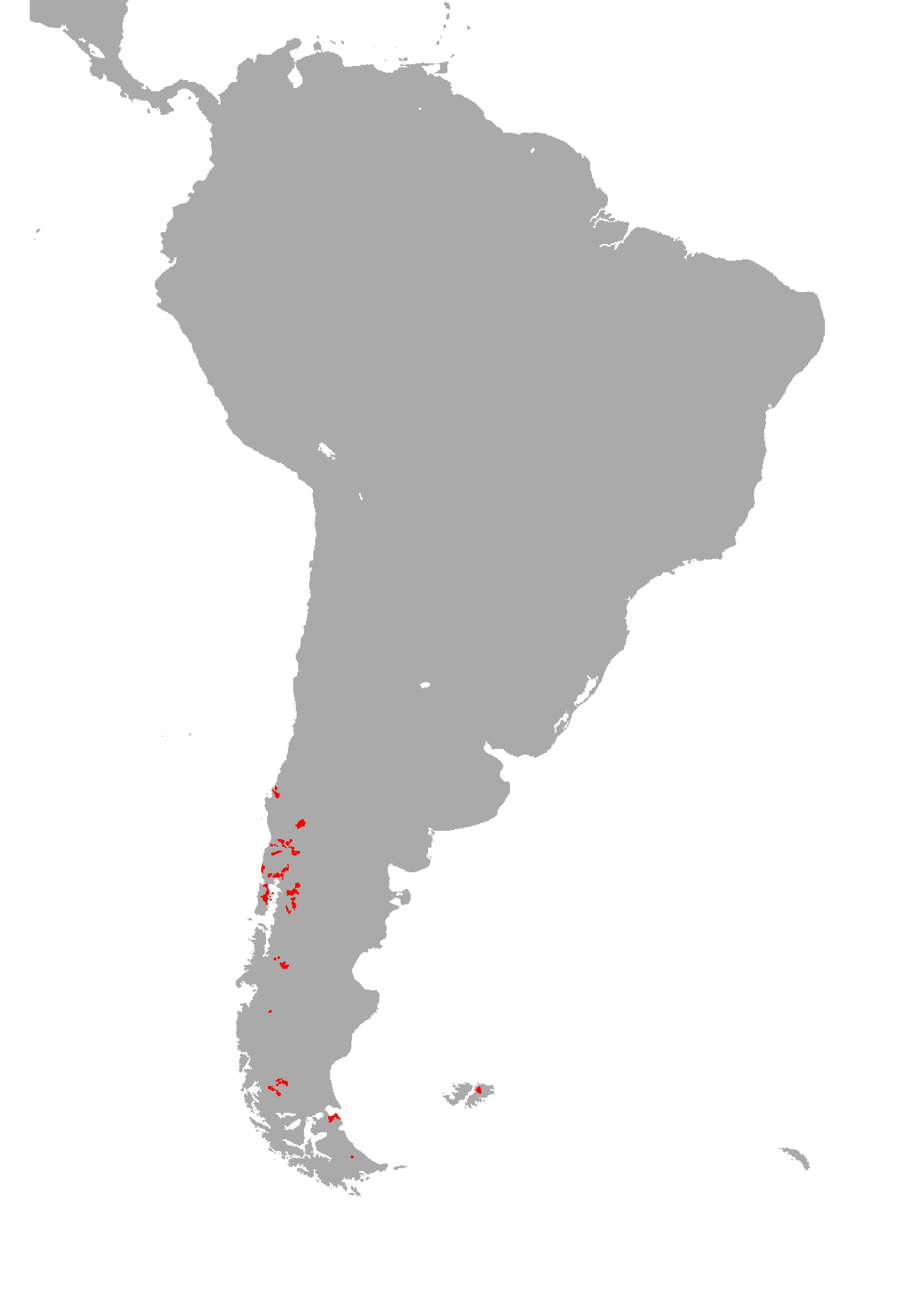

= Aplochiton zebra =

Species of ray-finned fish

Aplochiton zebra is a species of ray-finned fish in the family Galaxiidae. It is amphidromous.

Aplochiton zebra can be found in Chile and the Falkland Islands.

== Status ==
As of 2022, IUCN has listed Aplochiton zebra as Least Concern.
