= Chimehuin River =

Coordinates: 39°47′40″S 71°12′31″W

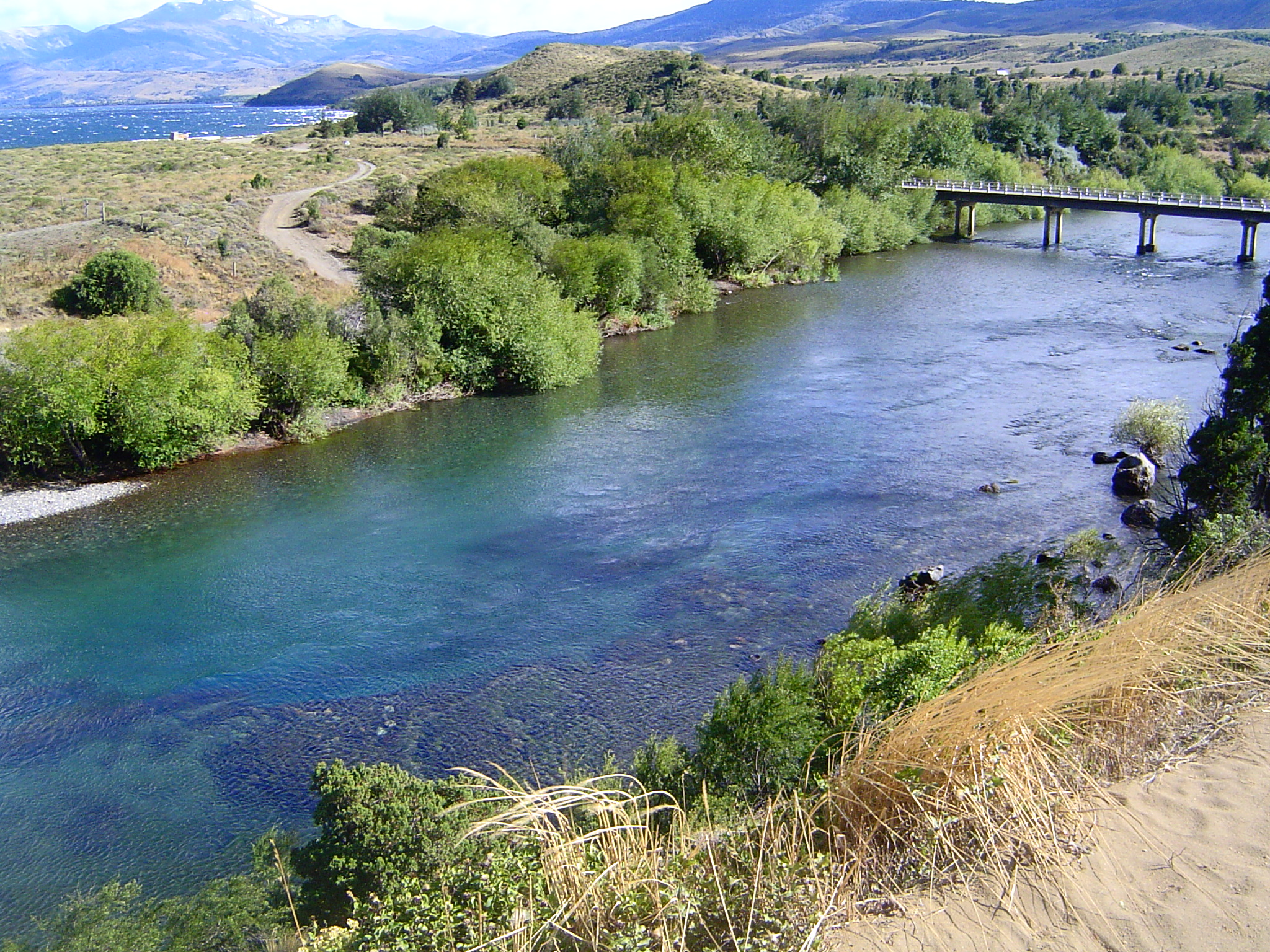

Location
- Country: Argentina

Physical characteristics
- Source
  - location: Lake Huechulafquen
- Mouth
  - elevation: 900 m (3,000 ft)
- Length: 53 km (33 mi)

The Chimehuin River is a river in the northwest of the Patagonic Province of Neuquén, Argentina. Its origin is at Lake Huechulafquen and it passes by the city of Junín de los Andes. After a course of about 53 km, it merges with the Aluminé River to form the Collón Curá River.

The Chimehuin is considered a prime spot for fly fishing. It is known for its two introduced species of Salmonidae, the brown trout and the rainbow trout.

The area around first part of the river's course (from the lake up to a few kilometers before Junín de los Andes) is a protected nature reserve (Área Natural Protegida Boca del Chimehuin).
