= Santo Tomás, Neuquén =

Santo Tomás
- Municipality and village
- Location within Neuquén Province Location within Argentina
- Coordinates: 39°52′S 70°05′W
- Country: Argentina
- Province: Neuquén Province
- Time zone: UTC−3 (ART)
- Climate: Csb

Santo Tomás (Neuquén) is a village and municipality in Neuquén Province in southwestern Argentina.
