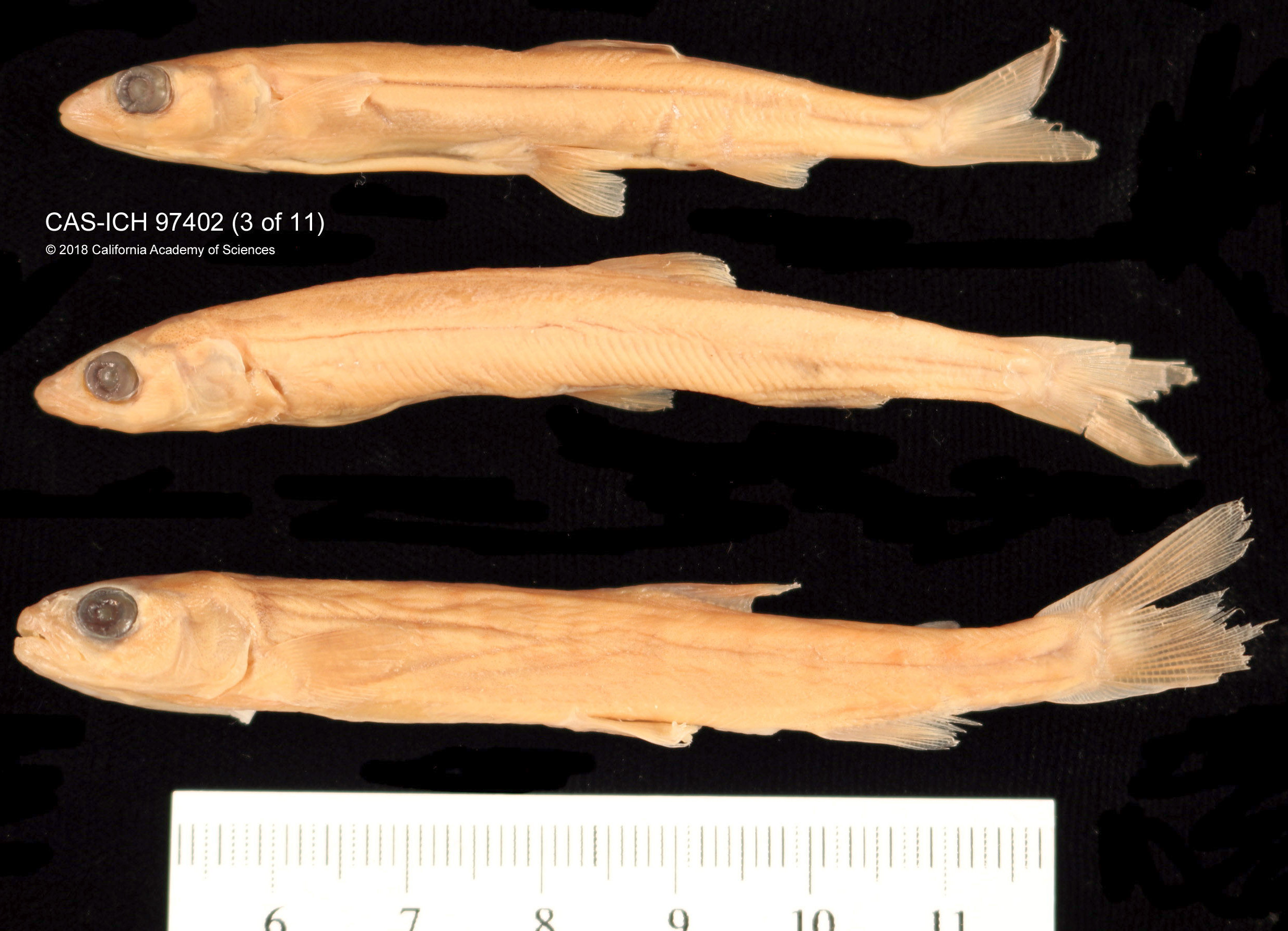

Conservation status
- Least Concern (IUCN 3.1)

Scientific classification
- Kingdom: Animalia
- Phylum: Chordata
- Class: Actinopterygii
- Division: Teleostei
- Order: Galaxiiformes
- Family: Galaxiidae
- Genus: Aplochiton
- Species: A. taeniatus

Binomial name
- Aplochiton taeniatus Jenyns, 1842
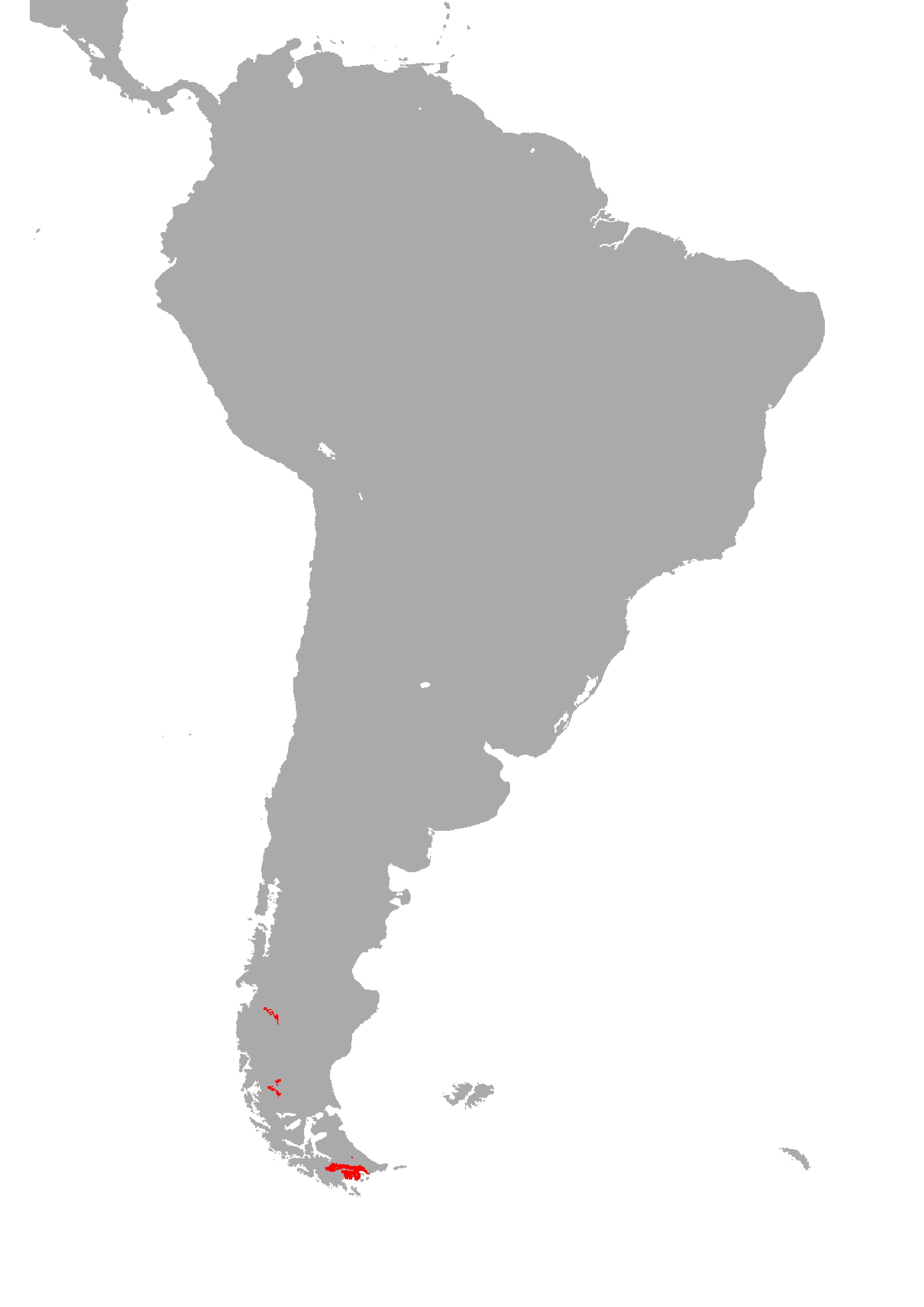

Synonyms
- Aplochiton marinus C. H. Eigenmann, 1928

= Aplochiton taeniatus =

Species of ray-finned fish

Aplochiton taeniatus is a species of amphidromous galaxiid native to Argentina and Chile in South America. This species grows to 33.4 cm (13.1 in) in standard length.
