= Mamuil Malal Pass =

Mountain pass in the Andes between Chile and Argentina

Mamuil Malal
- Interactive map of Mamuil Malal
- Elevation: 1,253 metres (4,111 ft)

Third Approach
- Location: Argentina–Chile border
- Range: Andes
- Coordinates: 39°34′43.11″S 71°29′16.43″W

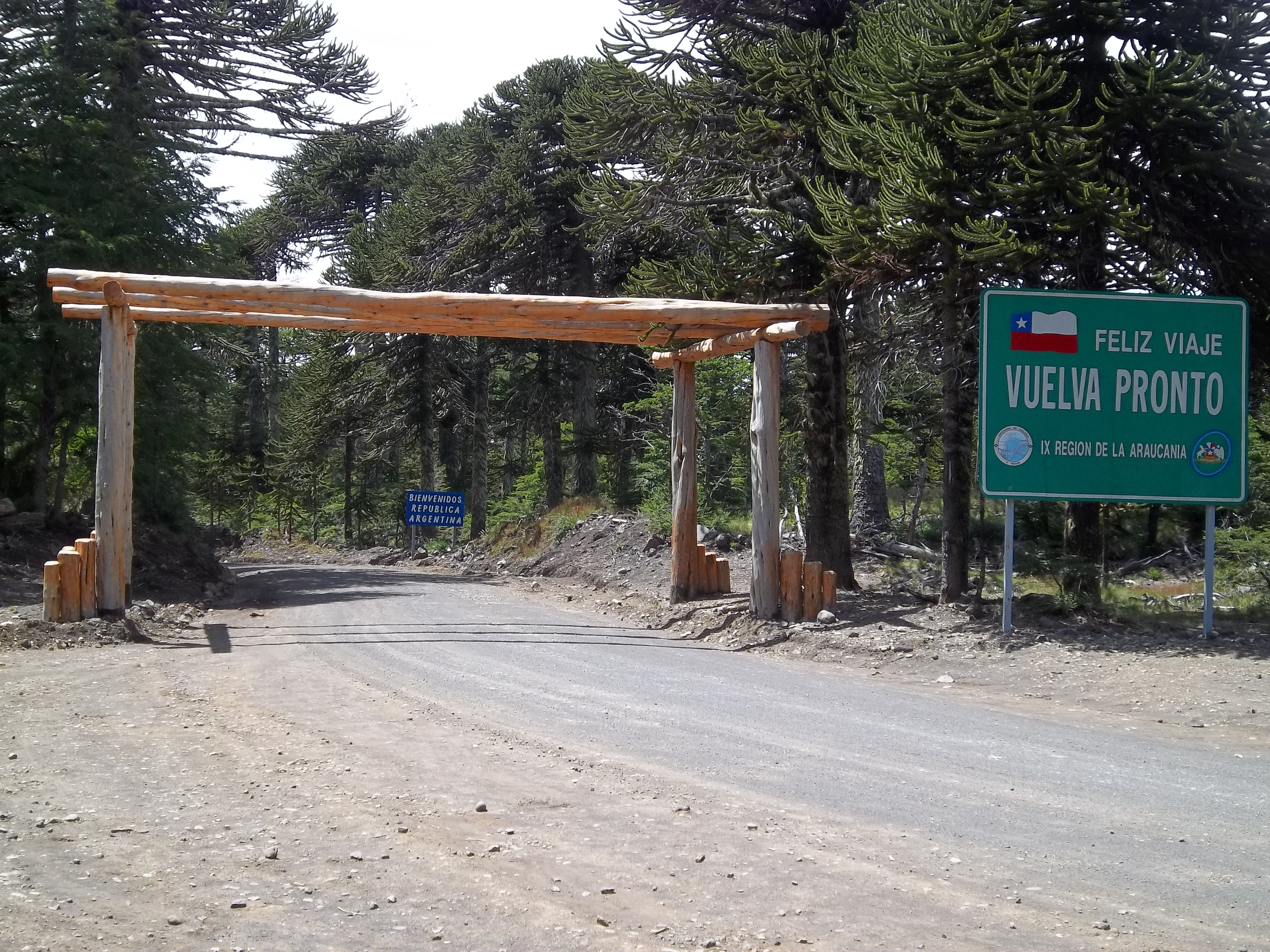
Mamuil Malal Pass

Mamuil Malal Pass (Mapudungun for corral of wooden sticks) is an international mountain pass in the Andes between Chile and Argentina. The pass connects Pucón and Curarrehue in Chile with Junín de los Andes in Argentina. The road passes just north of Lanín Volcano (3,747 metres (12,293 ft)). During winter the pass may close due to heavy snowfalls. From the Chilean side the pass is accessed through Route 199-CH, branch line which begins at the Panamerican Highway near Freire.
