= San Martín de los Andes =

- City
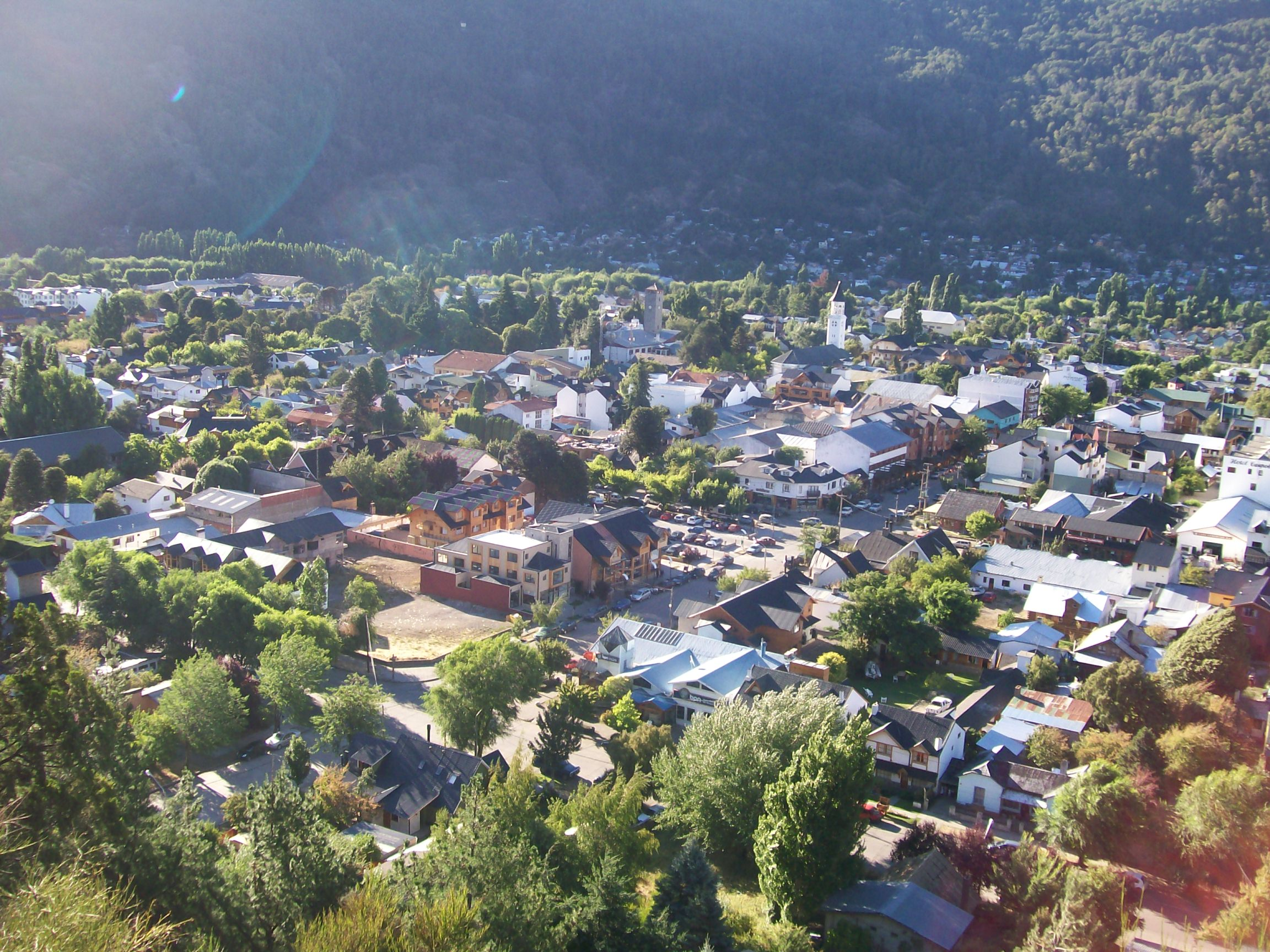
- Aerial view of the city

- Location within Neuquén Province Location within Argentina
- Coordinates: 40°10′S 071°21′W
- Country: Argentina
- Province: Neuquén
- Department: Lácar

Government
  - Intendant: Carlos Saloniti (MPN)

Area
  - Total: 140 km^{2} (54 sq mi)
- Elevation: 640 m (2,100 ft)

Population
  - Total: 23,519
  - Density: 170/km^{2} (440/sq mi)
- Time zone: UTC−3 (ART)
- CPA base: Q8370
- Dialing code: +54 2972
- Climate: Csb

San Martín de los Andes is a city in the south-west of the province of Neuquén, Argentina, serving as the administration centre of the Lácar Department. Lying at the foot of the Andes, on the Lácar lake, it is considered one of the main tourism destinations in the province. The National Route 40 runs to the city, connecting it with important touristic points in the south of the province, such as Lanín and Nahuel Huapí national parks.

The city was founded in 1898 as a military outpost to secure the Argentine sovereignty over the area. The economy of the then-mountain village was based on wood logging and husbandry until the opening of the Lanín National Park in 1937, when tourism became the main industry. Migration from different parts of the world, such as Europe and the Middle East, as well as from neighboring Chile and other Argentine provinces, contributed to the population growth.

== History ==
Before the founding of San Martín de los Andes, the valley of Chapelco was sparsely populated by indigenous Puelches who used it as a refuge during the harsh winters of the zone. The Puelches had, since colonial times, engaged in trade with the Huilliches on the eastern slope of the Andes through various mountain passes. Puelches raised horses on the eastern slopes of the Andes and traded them for weapons and alcoholic beverages, becoming one of the main food providers of the isolated exclave of Valdivia. The Argentine and Chilean military campaigns, the conquest of the Desert, and the occupation of Araucanía in the second half of the 19th century brought a definitive end to this trade.

German settlers began to arrive in neighboring southern Chile in the 1840s. Some of these settlers and their descendants began a lucrative leather industry, obtaining leather from indigenous communities across the Andes. In the 1880s the Argentine Army displaced indigenous communities, disrupting this trade and forcing leather merchants in Chile to cross the Andes themselves for supplies. This way numerous entrepreneurs from Chile, many with a German background, established cattle and trade businesses in the area of Lácar and Nahuel Huapi lakes.

In 1898 a military expedition arrived in the area to take control of the zone due to increasing border disputes with Chile. The Boundary Treaty of 1881 between Chile and Argentina led to disputes over whether the main Andean Mountain Range or the continental divide should serve as the border in this latitude. Chilean authorities argued that since Lácar Lake drained into the Pacific, the area of San Martín should belong to Chile. The Argentine government was also concerned about the zone's dependence on trade with Chile, just like in Bariloche and other parts of the southern Andes. San Martín de los Andes was founded on 4 February 1898 by Colonel Celestino Pérez, who followed orders from Chief of Army Rudecino Roca. Following the founding, the main economic activities were wood logging and husbandry.

A major change in settlement life came when Lanín National Park was created in 1937. This meant that logging was gradually reduced and numerous small settlements along the lake shore disappeared. New roads were built effectively connecting San Martín with the rest of Argentina. This led to increased trade that almost ended local husbandry and agriculture. In the 1970s, with the help of bank credits, many tourism enterprises were established in San Martín, making the town an important tourism center, especially during winter when the ski pistes are open.

== Geography ==
=== Geology ===
The city lies in an area of varied geology. Rocks in the area include metamorphic, plutonic and volcanic rocks. Metamorphic rocks found are schists, gneisses and migmatites, all of whom have sedimentary protoliths. Deposition of sediments occurred no earlier than in the Cambrian period and metamorphism occurred during the Devonian period as part of the Famatinian orogeny. Plutonic rocks around San Martín de los Andes crystallized from magma in the Devonian in connection to the onset of the Gondwanide orogeny. Plutonic rock types in the area are granodiorites, tonalites and less voluminous gabbros. Plutonic and metamorphic rocks make up the basement around San Martín de Los Andes, yet near Cerro Chapelco this basement is overlain by volcaniclastic and sedimentary rock belonging to Huitre Formation. The higher parts of Cerro Chapelco are made up of basaltic and andesitic lavas of Chapelco Formation which overlies Huitre Formation. These lavas erupted and cooled into rock about 4 million years ago in the Pliocene Epoch.

=== Climate ===
San Martín de los Andes has a cool ocean-influenced climate, on the boundary between Mediterranean (Köppen Csb) and oceanic (Cfb). Being shielded somewhat by the Andes in Chile, it is much less wet and more sunny than Chilean Patagonia, but still is very susceptible to heavy storms during the winter which tend to produce a mixture of rain and snow when they manage to retain some moisture over the Andean divide. However, when it is not raining or snowing heavily, the weather can be very sunny and fair, though the nights under these conditions are chilly and frost has occurred even during the summer.

Climate data for San Martín de los Andes (1993–2004)
Month	Jan	Feb	Mar	Apr	May	Jun	Jul	Aug	Sep	Oct	Nov	Dec	Year
Record high °C (°F)	38.0 (100.4)	34.7 (94.5)	36.9 (98.4)	26.6 (79.9)	22.1 (71.8)	16.7 (62.1)	16.3 (61.3)	21.3 (70.3)	24.7 (76.5)	28.4 (83.1)	30.8 (87.4)	33.5 (92.3)	38.0 (100.4)
Mean daily maximum °C (°F)	21.9 (71.4)	19.9 (67.8)	19.5 (67.1)	15.1 (59.2)	12.1 (53.8)	9.4 (48.9)	9.6 (49.3)	9.4 (48.9)	11.8 (53.2)	14.5 (58.1)	17.7 (63.9)	20.4 (68.7)	15.1 (59.2)
Daily mean °C (°F)	17.1 (62.8)	15.5 (59.9)	13.8 (56.8)	10.3 (50.5)	7.6 (45.7)	4.5 (40.1)	4.9 (40.8)	5.5 (41.9)	7.7 (45.9)	10.2 (50.4)	12.8 (55.0)	15.5 (59.9)	10.4 (50.7)
Mean daily minimum °C (°F)	11.8 (53.2)	10.1 (50.2)	8.8 (47.8)	6.1 (43.0)	3.1 (37.6)	0.0 (32.0)	0.4 (32.7)	1.9 (35.4)	3.4 (38.1)	5.0 (41.0)	7.4 (45.3)	10.0 (50.0)	5.6 (42.1)
Record low °C (°F)	3.1 (37.6)	0.1 (32.2)	−0.4 (31.3)	−3.5 (25.7)	−4.5 (23.9)	−7.1 (19.2)	−6.1 (21.0)	−4.8 (23.4)	−3.6 (25.5)	−1.3 (29.7)	0.2 (32.4)	−0.2 (31.6)	−7.1 (19.2)
Average precipitation mm (inches)	24.8 (0.98)	26.7 (1.05)	51.7 (2.04)	65.9 (2.59)	114.8 (4.52)	262.1 (10.32)	137.8 (5.43)	91.9 (3.62)	86.8 (3.42)	85.4 (3.36)	50.6 (1.99)	21.1 (0.83)	1,019.4 (40.13)
Average precipitation days	4.9	4.3	8.0	8.8	14.0	16.9	13.6	8.9	12.0	9.4	6.9	4.5	112.0
Source: Instituto Nacional de Tecnología Agropecuaria

== Demographics ==
As of the 2010 census there were 35,787 inhabitants in town, making it one of the most populous in the province of Neuquén. San Martín de los Andes has experienced a population growth of 34,29% since the census of 2001, when 23,519 lived in the area. By the time of the 1991 census, the city contained 15,711 residents. Previous censuses showed a total of 10,262 (1980) and 6,465 (1970) inhabitants, respectively.

Since its foundation as a military outpost, immigrants from different parts of Europe, including Spaniards, Italians, Germans, Dutch people and French, as well as Syrian-Lebanese store owners and settlers from neighboring Chile integrated with the local population, making it ethnically diverse from its beginnings. Over the years, migrants from other Argentine provinces contributed to the population growth.

== Economy and tourism ==
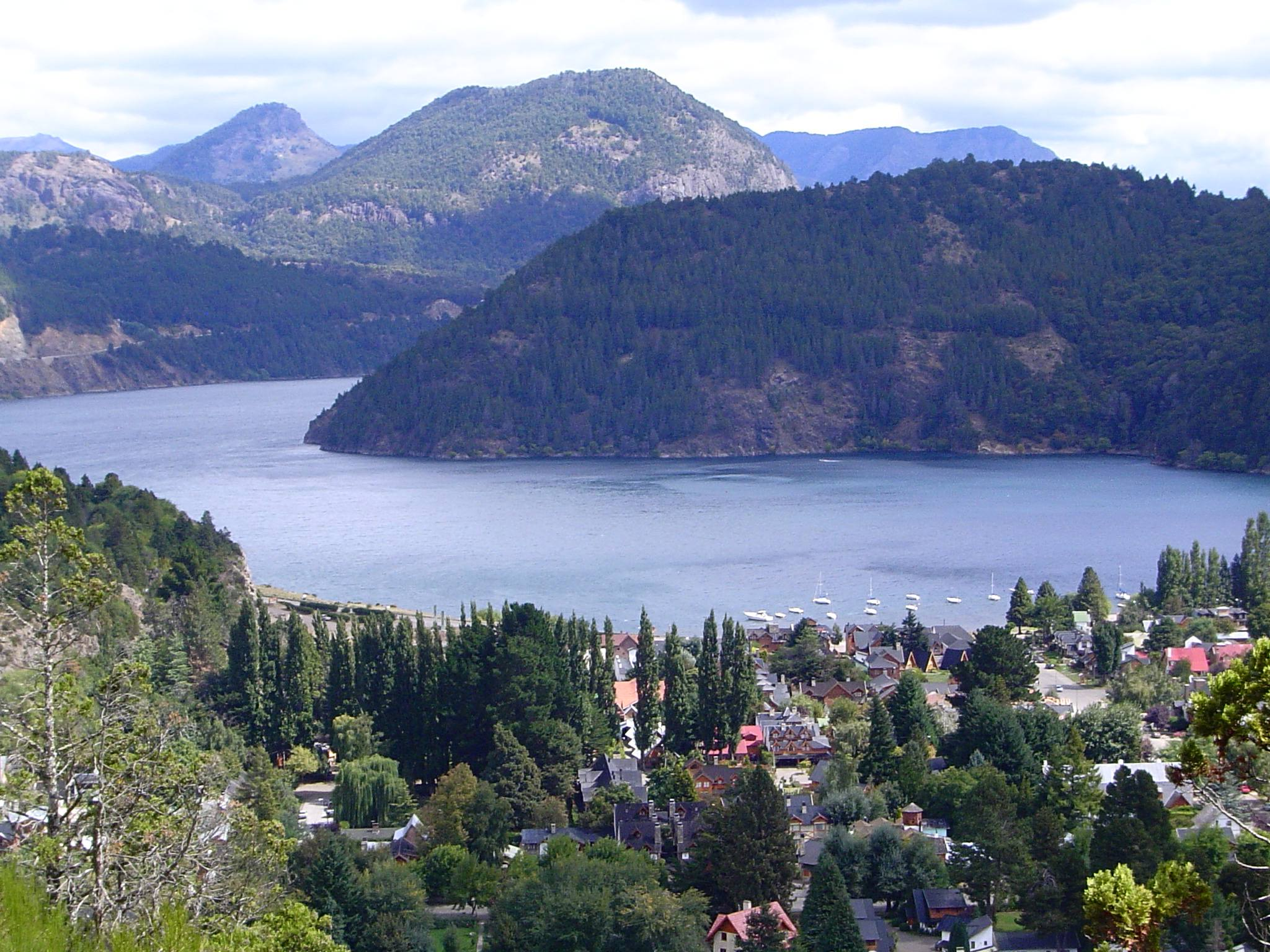
View of the city's coast facing the Lácar Lake

San Martín de los Andes is considered one of the main tourist destinations in the Neuquén province in both summer and winter. Not far from the town centre, the surrounding environment offers the possibility to practise outdoor activities such as hiking, mountain trekking and rafting. Serving as the seat of the administration headquarters of the Lanín National Park, the city is the gateway to several tourist destinations in the southern Neuquén province, including the Lanín and Nahuel Huapi national parks, and Cerro Chapelco.

Tourism became the priority for the region after the opening of the Lanín National Park in 1937, displacing husbandry and wood logging, which did not correspond with it. Though considerably reduced, the wood logging industry remained as a minor activity through the years, creating local jobs.

San Martín de los Andes hosts a series of regular events. Every year the National Mountainman Festival and the Trabún Festival are celebrated, both related to the local culture. The South American Bird Fair, the main birding meeting on the continent, takes place in the town.

== Architecture ==
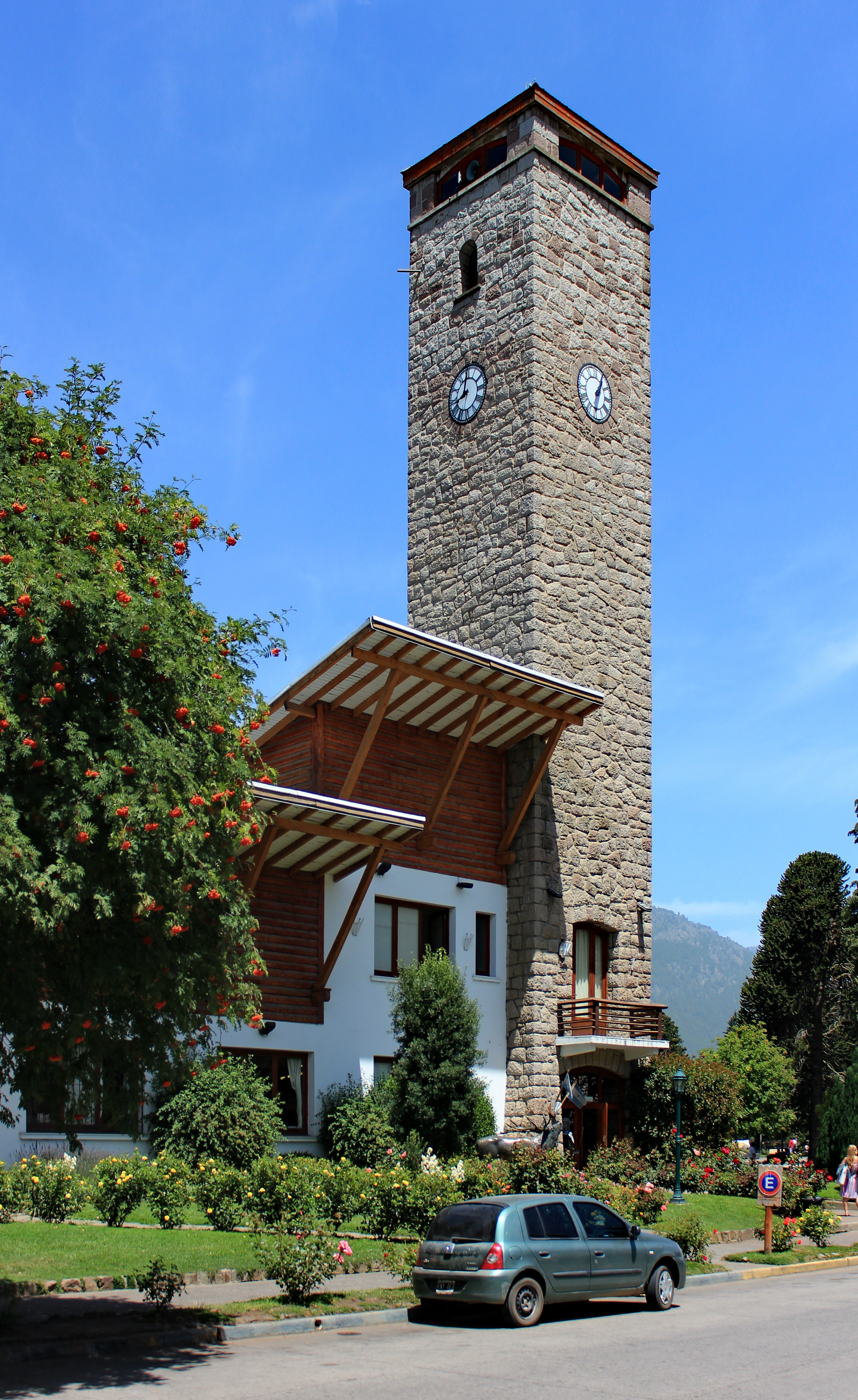
Town hall

San Martín de los Andes was modeled like a mountain village built with traditional materials for the region, such as stone, wood and shingle roofs. Buildings belonging to the early 20th century include the First Post Office (1899), the Old Lácar Hotel (1910), the Primeros Pobladores Museum building (1911), the old-fashioned Chidiak general store (1938) and houses of the pioneer families.

The creation of the Lanín National Park and the restriction of use of wood from the protected territory was restricted, bringing a second period of architectural style, where the two-storey houses were introduced. Some of the buildings from this period include the first aid centre (1942), the Lanín National Park administration building (1946) the first school of the village (1948), and the town hall (1960).

The city started growing rapidly after establishing itself as a tourist destination in the 1970s. Since then, the architects generally abandoned the traditional mountain village style to erect more city-like structures with modern materials.

== Transportation ==
San Martín de los Andes is served by National Route 40, which runs north–south through the city, connecting it with Junín de los Andes to the north and Villa La Angostura to the south. The southern stretch between the former is known as the Road of the Seven Lakes, crossing the Lanín and Nahuel Huapi national parks. Provincial Route 19 connects the city with popular tourist destination Cerro Chapelco. Additionally, Provincial Route 62 ends in the city.

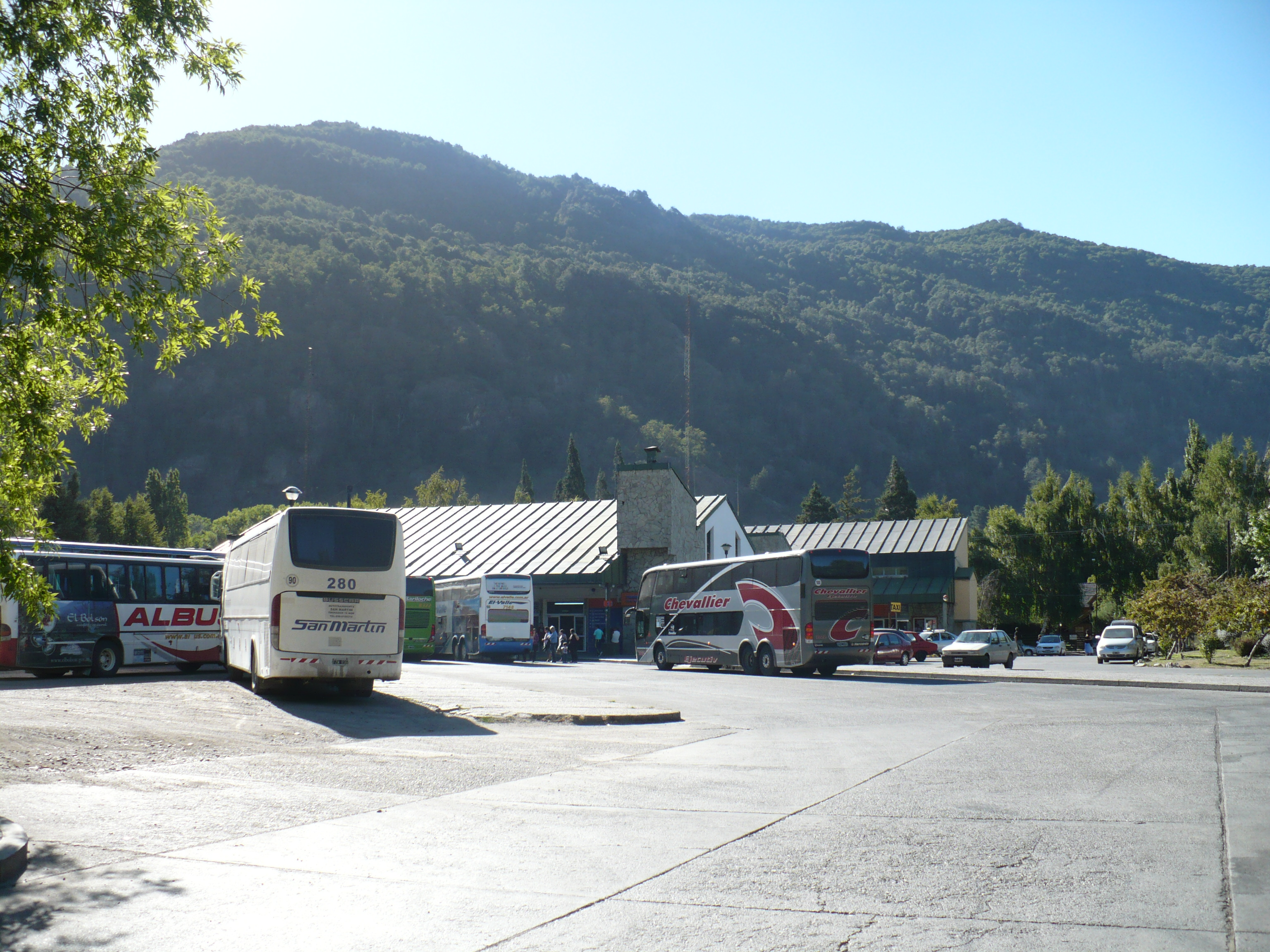
Local bus station

Situated near the border, there are different options to cross into Chile, including the Hua Hum Pass (through Provincial Route 48), Carirriñe Pass and Mamuil Malal Pass (both via Junín de los Andes to the north) and the Cardenal Antonio Samoré Pass (via Villa La Angostura to the south). Hua-Hum international pass, which leads to Panguipulli in Chile, lies 45 km (28 mi) from San Martín de los Andes. Once the border is crossed into Chile, a ferry across Lake Pirihueico enables travelers to cover the distance from Puerto Pirihueico to Puerto Fuy, as there are no roads in this area.

Public transportation includes a bus network. There are lines connecting the city with the nearby attractions and villages. Additionally, taxi agencies operate in the city.

The city has a bus terminal with both long- and medium-distance services, connecting it with a large variety of points in Argentina as well as with neighboring Chile. The town is served by the Aviador Carlos Campos Airport, which is 22 km (14 mi) away from the centre and is considered the main airport in southern Neuquén province.

== Sports ==
Its natural conditions for outdoor sports and year-round activities make the area attractive for tourists. During summer it is possible to go mountain biking, fishing and horseback riding, among other things. During winter, the nearby Cerro Chapelco is a renowned ski centre in Argentina and South America, where a variety of winter sports like skiing and snowboarding are practised.

The area has hosted different sports events of national and international level, such as the San Martín de los Andes marathons and Snowboardcross competitions of the FIS Snowboard World Cup.

Athletic Curruhinca, an amateur soccer team made up of players from San Martin de los Andes, won the title "Copa Cablevision" in 2013, becoming the first amateur soccer champion in the capital of Buenos Aires originally coming from this city.

== Sister cities ==
- Rocca di Cambio, Italy
- Steamboat Springs, Colorado, United States
- Pucón, Chile
- Mayrouba, Lebanon
