= Lanín =

Stratovolcano on the Argentina–Chile border

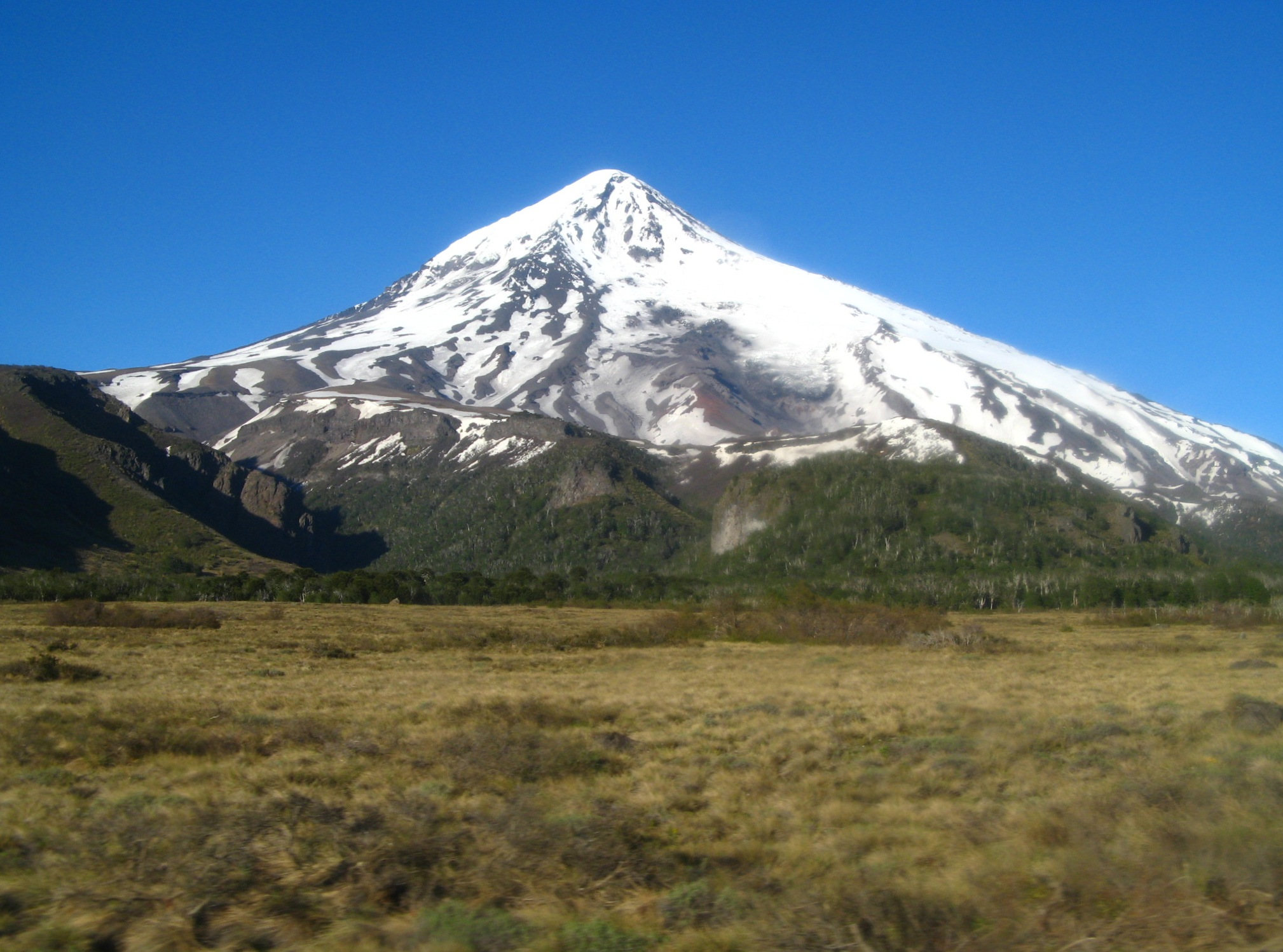
- Lanín as seen from Mamuil Malal Pass

Highest point
- Elevation: 3,747 m (12,293 ft) "Volcán Lanín, Argentina/Chile" on Peakbagger
- Prominence: 2,631 m (8,632 ft)
- Listing: Region high point Ultra
- Coordinates: 39°37′58″S 71°29′59″W

Geography
- Location within Argentina
- Location: Argentina / Chile
- Parent range: Andes

Geology
- Mountain type: Stratovolcano
- Volcanic zone: South Volcanic Zone
- Last eruption: 560 CE ± 150 years

Climbing
- Easiest route: rock/snow/ice

Lanín is an ice-clad, cone-shaped stratovolcano on the border of Argentina and Chile. It forms part of two national parks: Lanín in Argentina and Villarrica in Chile. As a part of the flag and anthem of the Argentine province of Neuquén, it serves as a symbol for the region. Although the date of its last eruption is not known, it is estimated to have occurred within the last 10,000 years. Following the 1906 Valparaíso earthquake a local newspaper reported the volcano to have erupted, but a work published in 1917 by Karl Sapper disputed this.

The ascent is regulated by the management of Argentine National Parks and the Argentine National Gendarmerie and is technically relatively simple but has a much higher level of exposure than the neighbouring volcanoes. The nearest towns, usually employed as a base for climbers, are Pucón in Chile and Junín de los Andes in Argentina.

There are two paths to the summit: one on the north, starting at 1,200 metres above mean sea level near Tromen Lake and the international Mamuil Malal Pass, accessible via Neuquén's Provincial Route 60; and one on the south, starting beside Huechulafquen Lake, accessible via Provincial Route 61.

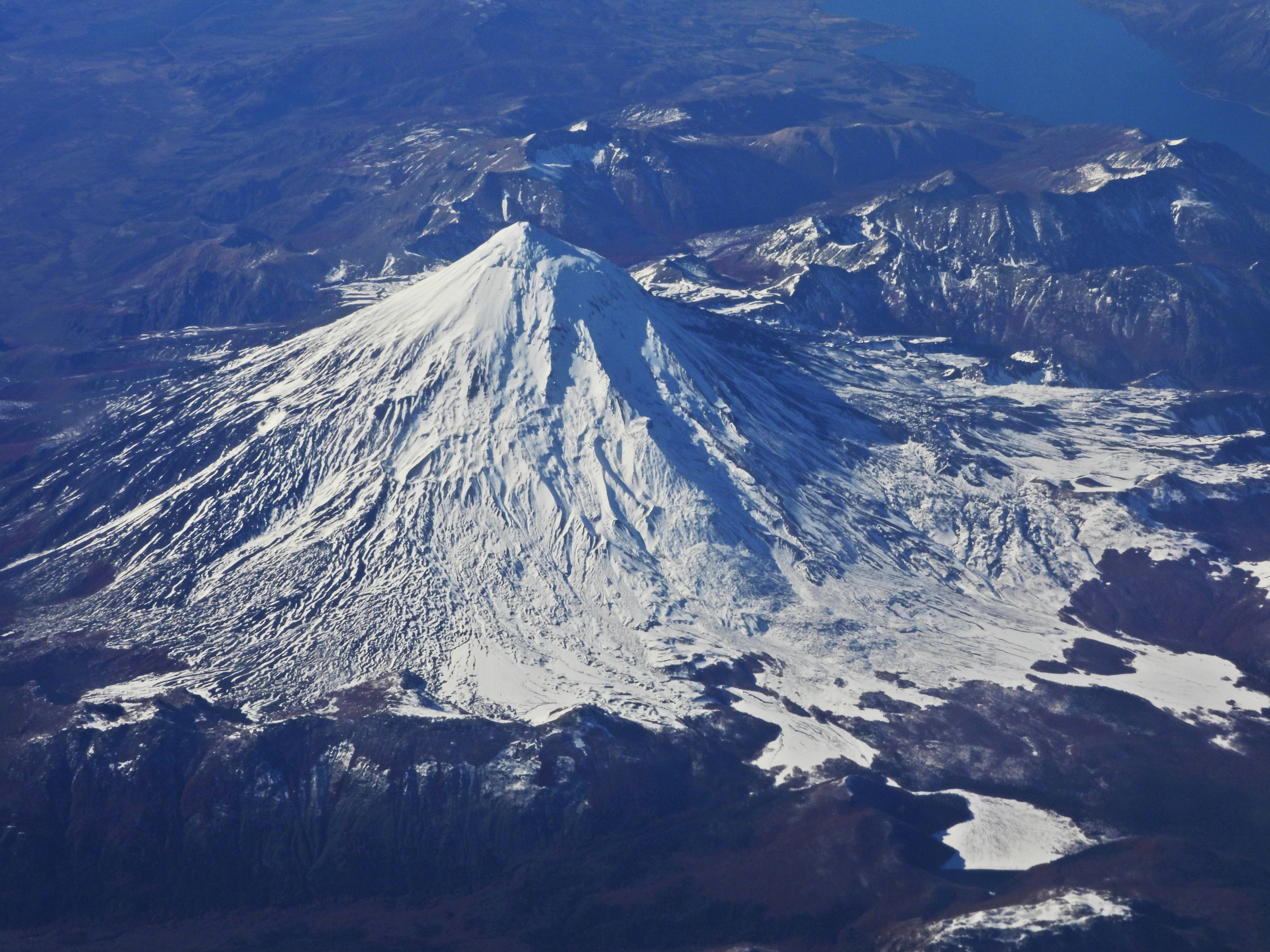
Lanin volcano seen from air towards the east

== Geography and geology ==
Lanín lies at the Atlantic-Pacific water divide of the Andes, being for that reason located on the Argentina-Chile border according to the 1881 border treaty between these countries. To the north and south lie the Tromen and Paimun Lakes, respectively.

Lanín is the easternmost volcano of a north-west south-east oriented chain of three large stratovolcanoes, Villarrica being the westernmost one and Quetrupillán the one in the middle. This alignment is attributed to the existence of a fault beneath the volcanoes. In historical times, Lanín has been the least active of these volcanoes. Apart from Quetrupillán and Villarrica, there are a number of old eroded remains of stratovolcanoes in the alignment.

The volcano itself rests on a basement of gneisses, felsic plutons, and volcaniclastic sequences. The basement rocks constitute a tectonically elevated block limited in the west by the north–south Reigolil-Pirihueico Fault. Ages of ranging from Late Pliocene to Early Pleistocene have been suggested for the oldest known parts of the volcano, which are dacitic lava flows with columnar joints.

Basalt is the most common rock of the volcano. Lanín shows overall higher alkali (Na_{2}O plus K_{2}O) to silica ratio than Villarrica, which is interpreted as reflecting a lesser degree of partial melting underneath the volcano and showing that the volcanoes of the chain have distinct source regions in Earth's mantle. Another petrologic characteristic of Lanín is its bimodal volcanism.

== See also ==
- List of volcanoes in Chile
- List of volcanoes in Argentina
- List of Ultras of South America
- Quetrupillán
