= Huiliches Department =

Coordinates: 39°57′03″S 71°04′15″W

Huiliches
- Department
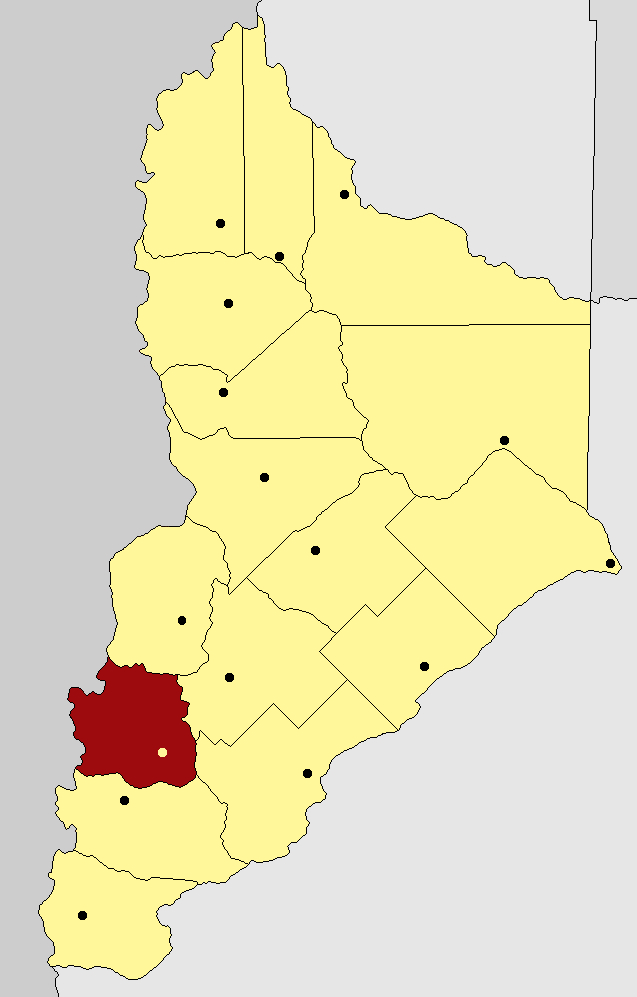
- Country: Argentina
- Province: Neuquén
- Capital: Junín de los Andes

Area
  - Total: 4,012 km^{2} (1,549 sq mi)

Population (2022)
  - Total: 20,973
  - Density: 5.228/km^{2} (13.54/sq mi)
- Important cities: Junín de los Andes: Auca - Pan; Atreuco; Chiquilihuin; Malleo; Tropezón; Puerto Tromen; Tres Puentes

Huiliches is a department located in the south of Neuquén Province, Argentina.

== Geography ==
The Department limits at north with Aluminé Department, Catán Lil Department at northeast, Collón Cura Department at southeast, Lácar Department at south and Chile at east.
