= Lanín National Park =

National park in Argentina

- Parque Nacional Lanín
- IUCN category II (national park)
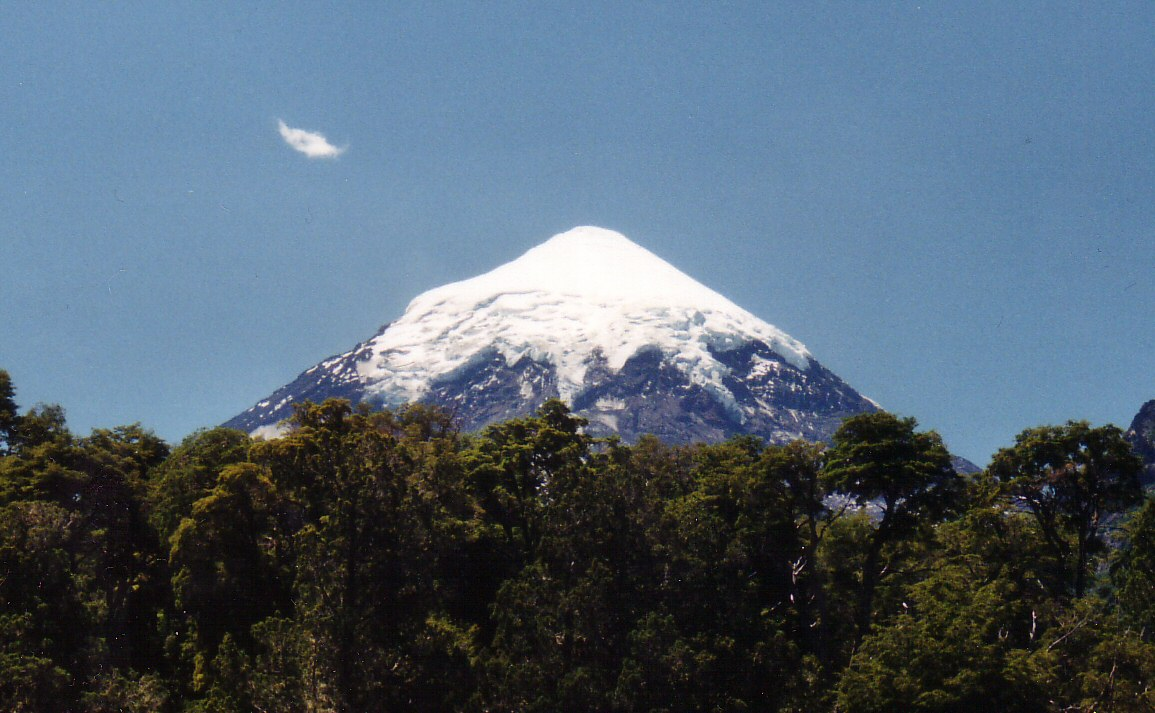
- Lanín volcano

- Location within Argentina
- Coordinates: 40.1603°S 71.3575°W
- Area: 379.000 ha (936.53 acres)
- Established: 1937

Lanín National Park (Spanish: Parque Nacional Lanín) is a national park of Argentina, located in the Neuquén Province, with forests of diverse tree varieties, mainly Fagaceae and conifers such as the lenga and the Araucaria, many species of which are not found elsewhere in Argentina.

The park contains the Lanín volcano, and the Huechulafquen, Aluminé, and Lácar lakes among other attractions. Sport fishing of salmon and trout is practiced in the lakes and the numerous rivers and streams. The animal life of the park is similar to the southern Nahuel Huapi National Park.

The city of San Martín de los Andes on the shore of Lake Lácar serves as hub for tourists visiting the park, as well as to skiers visiting the nearby Chapelco ski centre.

== Climate ==
The park mostly has a moist temperate climate (except at the higher altitudes). Mean temperatures range from 4 °C (39.2 °F) in winter to 20 °C (68.0 °F) in summer. Mean annual precipitation is around 1,800 mm (71 in) although in certain areas, they can exceed 4,000 mm (160 in). Most of the precipitation is concentrated from May to August while snowfall can fall anytime from May to October.
