= List of living mammal species described in the 2020s: 2020–2021 =

== List of species ==
Legend to the BGR column

AF Afrotropical AN Antarctic AU Australasian IM Indomalayan NA Nearctic NT Neotropical OC Oceanian PA Palearctic

| publ-date (Note: The date of the first publication of the scientific source in which the species/subspecies was first described. In accordance with ISO 8601 and MOS:DATEFORMAT, all dates are recorded in "yyyy-mm-dd" format. The odd and even years highlighted by different colors.) | Order | Family | Scientific name (Note: In this column, the species highlighted by yellow (#F9F5B0) and the subspecies stay unhighlighted. The links to the enwiki articles are supplied with the interwiki links to the appropriate Wikidata items (displayed as superscript "[wd]" after each name), they will be especially useful if some articles are absent and you've decided to create them.) | Common name (Note: The rules for using of capital letters in common names are stated in MOS:LIFE.) | morph-pict (Note: This column contains morphological pictograms which roughly illustrate the appearance of the listed taxa. The main Wikicommons category where such images are stacked is Realistic silhouettes of mammals.) | BGR | Coordinates (Note: The geographic coordinates of the place where the holotype was collected.) | Location (Note: Description of the location where the holotype was collected. Some absent geographic articles that exist in any other language suppled with the interwiki links to the appropriate Wikidata items (superscript "[wd]"). You can help to improve Wikipedia by creating their English conterparts.) | coll-date (Note: The date on which the holotype was collected.) | Wikispp (Note: Since the Wikispecies "id" corresponds to the taxon's sci-name, which listed in the appropriate column, the links in this column shall not be named to play the role of a row counter in the table.) | NCBI ID | MDD ID |
|---|---|---|---|---|---|---|---|---|---|---|---|---|
| 2020-01-24 | Eulipotyphla | Soricidae | Crocidura huangshanensis | Huangshan white-toothed shrew | | PA | 30°04′58″N 118°09′02″E | Temperate montane mixed forest alongside the Fuxi road (~616 m a.s.l.) on the S slope of the Mt. Huangshan, ~3 km W of the town of Tangkou, Huangshan District, Anhui Province, SE China. | 2017-06-15 | sp. | 2806439 | 1003877 |
| 2020-01-24 | Diprotodontia | Macropodidae | Petrogale lateralis centralis | Central Australian rock wallaby | | AU | 23°30′S 134°42′E | Tropical upland xeric shrubland (~750 m a.s.l.) at the Paddy's Hole Dam, East MacDonnell Ranges, near the locality of Arltunga, ~87 km NEE of the town of Alice Springs, Northern Territory, C Australia. | 1977-07-13 | ssp. | | 1000301 |
| 2020-01-24 | Diprotodontia | Macropodidae | Petrogale lateralis kimberleyensis | West Kimberley rock wallaby | | AU | 18°25′S 123°05′E | Tropical lowland savanna (~150 m a.s.l.) at the Logues Spring, Edgar Range, near the wheather station of Dampier Downs, ~103 km SE of the coastal town of Broome Kimberley Region, Western Australia, NW Australia. | 1977-10-13 | ssp. | | 1000301 |
| 2020-02-28 | Rodentia | Muridae | Hylomyscus mpungamachagorum | Mahale wood mouse | | AF | 6°06′16″S 29°46′44″E | Tropical montane moist forest (~2100 m a.s.l.), located ~0.5 km NW of the Nkungwe Hill summit, Mahale Mts, Mahale National Park, Kigoma District, Kigoma Region, CW Tanzania. | 2003-08-25 | sp. | 2735142 | 1003454 |
| 2020-02-28 | Rodentia | Muridae | Hylomyscus pygmaeus | Pygmy wood mouse | | AF | 0°14′29″S 20°53′00″E | Tropical lowland moist forest (~358 m a.s.l.) on the right bank of the Tshuapa River, ~4 km N of the town of Boende, Tshuapa, C DR Congo. | 2012-06-13 | sp. | 2735143 | 1003457 |
| 2020-02-28 | Rodentia | Muridae | Hylomyscus stanleyi | Stanley's wood mouse | | AF | 7°51′50″S 31°40′10″E | Montane cloud forest patch(~2200 m a.s.l.) at the Mbizi Forest Reserve in the Mbizi Mts., ~4 km E of the village of Wipanga, Sumbawanga District, Rukwa, W Tanzania. | 2001-08-03 | sp. | 2735144 | 1003459 |
| 2020-02-28 | Rodentia | Muridae | Hylomyscus thornesmithae | Mother Ellen's wood mouse | | AF | 0°10′09″S 20°55′34″E | Tropical lowland moist forest (~322 m a.s.l.) on the right bank of the Tshuapa River, ~14 km NE of the town of Boende, Tshuapa, C DR Congo. | 2013-06-27 | sp. | 2735145 | 1003461 |
| 2020-03-02 | Chiroptera | Miniopteridae | Miniopterus nimbae | Nimba long-fingered bat | | AF | 7°33′16″N 8°37′44″W | Mine adit surrounded by the tropical upland moist broadleaf forest (~720 m a.s.l.), located ~9 km SWW of the town of Yekepa, Nimba County, N Liberia. | 2010-12-18 | sp. | | 1005128 |
| 2020-03-23 | Chiroptera | Vespertilionidae | Lasiurus arequipae | Arequipa red bat | | NT | 15°58′40″S 72°27′53″W | Rocky slopes (~726 m a.s.l.) of the arable Colca River valley surrounded by the tropical montane arid shrubland, ~11.5 km NNE of the town of Aplao, Castilla Province, Arequipa Department, S Peru. | 2017-08-17 | sp. | 2720563 | 1005572 |
| 2020-04-01 | Primates | Cercopithecidae | Cercopithecus mitis manyaraensis | Manyara monkey | | AF | 3°22′00″S 35°50′00″E | Tropical montane seasonal semi-deciduous woodland (~970 m a.s.l.), located ~4 km N of the Lake Manyara, Mbulu District, Manyara Region, N Tanzania. | 1937-08-01 | ssp. | | 1000574 |
| 2020-04-15 | Rodentia | Cricetidae | Peromyscus purepechus | Purepechus deermouse | | NT | 19°36′53″N 101°56′02″W | Tropical montane mixed conifer-broadleaf woodland (~2300 m a.s.l.) alongside the road, located ~4 km SW of the town of Nahuatzen, Nahuatzen Municipality, Michoacán State, CW Mexico. | 1968-12-28 | sp. | 2742916 | 1002329 |
| 2020-05-13 | Rodentia | Muridae | Niviventer fengi | Feng's white-bellied rat | | IM | 28°29′06″N 85°13′28″E | Subtropical montane conifer forest (~3295 m a.s.l.) dominated by cypresses and located in the Jilong River valley, ~14 km NW of the town of Jilong, Jilong County, Shigatse Prefecture, TAR, SW China. | 2017-10-16 | sp. | 2773612 | 1003590 |
| 2020-05-22 | Eulipotyphla | Soricidae | Notiosorex tataticuli | Ticul's desert shrew | | NT | 24°07′08″N 110°04′01″W | Subtropical upland xeric shrubland (~675 m a.s.l.), located ~8 km NW of the coastal town of El Sargento, Baja California Sur, NW Mexico. | 2013-11-03 | sp. | | 1004211 |
| 2020-05-22 | Eulipotyphla | Soricidae | Notiosorex tataticuli arroyoi | Ticul's desert shrew (arroyoi) | | NA | 30°29′N 116°07′W | Subtropical lowland xeric shrubland (~75 m a.s.l.) on the volcanic islet named Isla San Martín, located ~5.5 km W off the mainland coast, Baja California, NW Mexico. | 2017-10-19 | ssp. | | 1004211 |
| 2020-05-22 | Eulipotyphla | Soricidae | Notiosorex tataticuli ocanai | Ticul's desert shrew (ocanai) | | NA | 30°22′17″N 115°51′52″W | Subtropical coastal xeric shrubland (~3 m a.s.l.) near the locality of Ejido Nueva Odisea, ~22.5 km SSE of the town of San Quintin, Baja California, NW Mexico. | 2015-11-21 | ssp. | | 1004211 |
| 2020-05-25 | Rodentia | Cricetidae | Geoxus lafkenche | Guafo Island long-clawed mouse | | NT | 43°34′00″S 74°49′30″W | Temperate coastal mixed forest (~120 m a.s.l.) at the lighthouse at Punta Weather, located in the NW part of the island of Guafo, Los Lagos Region, S Chile. | 2012-01 | sp. | 1823747 | 1002383 |
| 2020-05-29 | Rodentia | Ctenomyidae | Ctenomys bidaui | Bidau's tuco-tuco | | NT | 42°34′S 64°17′W | Temperate semi-arid shrubland (~5 m a.s.l.) near the coastal settlement of Puerto Pirámides, Biedma Department, Chubut Province, S Argentina. | 2000-01-13 | sp. | 2735992 | 1001311 |
| 2020-05-29 | Rodentia | Ctenomyidae | Ctenomys contrerasi | Contreras's tuco-tuco | | NT | 42°30′39″S 64°44′50″W | Temperate lowland semi-arid shrubland(~10 m a.s.l.) alongside the local highway, located ~35 km NE of the town of Puerto Madryn, Biedma Department, Chubut Province, S Argentina. | 1999-03-28 | sp. | 2735993 | 1001317 |
| 2020-05-29 | Rodentia | Ctenomyidae | Ctenomys contrerasi navonae | Navone's tuco-Tuco | | NT | 43°42′06″S 70°20′57″W | Temperate montane semi-arid shrubland (~844 m a.s.l.) at Estancia Quichaura, ~42 km SE of the town of Tecka Languiñeo Department, Chubut Province, S Argentina. | 2005-12-14 | ssp. | | 1001317 |
| 2020-05-29 | Rodentia | Ctenomyidae | Ctenomys thalesi | Thales's tuco-tuco | | NT | 43°45′11″S 65°26′41″W | Temperate lowland semi-arid shrubland (~150 m a.s.l.) at Establecimiento La Clara, ~50 km S of the town of Gaiman, Gaiman Department, Chubut Province, S Argentina. | 1999-03-23 | sp. | 2735994 | 1001366 |
| 2020-06-21 | Chiroptera | Phyllostomidae | Micronycteris simmonsae | Simmons's big-eared bat | | NT | 1°04′21″N 78°42′41″W | Tropical lowland moist forest (~88 m a.s.l.), located ~2.3 km SW of the village of San Francisco de Bogotá, San Lorenzo Canton, Esmeraldas Province, Ecuador. | 2004-08-09 | sp. | 2748164 | 1004963 |
| 2020-06-21 | Chiroptera | Phyllostomidae | Micronycteris tresamici | Northern big-eared bat | | NT | 15°44′04″N 87°27′22″W | Tropical lowland moist evergreen broadleaf forest (~34 m a.s.l.) at the Lancetilla Botanical Garden, ~4.5 km SSE of the coastal town of Tela, Atlántida Department, NW Honduras. | 2004-07-14 | sp. | 2748165 | 1004964 |
| 2020-07-06 | Eulipotyphla | Soricidae | Sorex cruzi | Cruz's long-tailed shrew | | NT | 15°30′47″N 88°14′29″W | Tropical montane moist mixed forest (~1836 m a.s.l.) in the Omoa Mts., Cusuco National Park, ~20 km W of the city of San Pedro Sula, Cortés Department, NW Honduras. | 2018-07-19 | sp. | | 1004231 |
| 2020-07-27 | Primates | Cheirogaleidae | Microcebus jonahi | Jonah's mouse lemur | | AF | 16°12′18″S 49°35′22″E | Tropical lowland moist evergreen broadleaf forest edge (~342 m a.s.l.), located ~2.5 km W of the village of Ambavala, Mananara Avaratra District, NE Madagascar. | 2017-09-06 | sp. | | 1000949 |
| 2020-07-31 | Rodentia | Cricetidae | Rhipidomys ochoagrateroli | Ochoa-Graterol's climbing rat | | NT | 10°24′11″N 68°48′01″W | Tropical montane mixed forest (~1940 m a.s.l.) in the Aroa Mts., Yurubí National Park, ~7.5 km NW of the city of San Felipe, Yaracuy, NW Venezuela. | 2011-11-13 | sp. | | 1006490 |
| 2020-09-03 | Chiroptera | Miniopteridae | Miniopterus wilsoni | Wilson's long-fingered bat | | AF | 18°28′59″S 34°02′41″E | Tropical montane riverine mixed forest (~920 m a.s.l.) on the SW slope of the Mt. Gorongosa, Gorongosa National Park, ~22 km N of the town of Gorongosa, Sofala Province, C Mozambique. | 2018-04-22 | sp. | | 1005140 |
| 2020-09-04 | Chiroptera | Vespertilionidae | Pipistrellus simandouensis | Simandou pipistrelle | | AF | 8°32′54″N 8°53′48″W | Tropical montane seasonal forest patch (~950 m a.s.l.) in a ravine on the E slope of the Simandou Range, ~30 km SW of the town of Beyla, Beyla Prefecture, Nzérékoré Region, SE Guinea. | 2008-02-25 | sp. | | 1005636 |
| 2020-09-05 | Rodentia | Cricetidae | Neacomys marajoara | Marajó bristly mouse | | NT | 0°39′00″S 50°11′00″W | Tropical lowland seasonally flooded forest (~5 m a.s.l.) on the right bank of the Anajás River on the coastal island of Marajó, near the Tauari Farm, Chaves Municipality, Pará State, NE Brazil. | 2009-01-19 | sp. | 2771494 | 1002580 |
| 2020-09-05 | Rodentia | Cricetidae | Neacomys vossi | Voss's bristly mouse | | NT | 5°14′00″S 56°56′00″W | Tropical lowland moist evergreen forest (~120 m a.s.l.) on the right bank of the Tapajós River, near Boca do Rato, Itaituba Municipality, Pará State, CN Brazil. | 2013-04-02 | sp. | 2771495 | 1002589 |
| 2020-09-05 | Rodentia | Cricetidae | Neacomys xingu | Xingu bristly mouse | | NT | 5°46′00″S 50°32′00″W | Tropical lowland moist evergreen forest (~300 m a.s.l.) on the shore of a lake at the Tapirapé-Aquiri National Forest, Marabá, Pará, N Brazil. | 2009-08-28 | sp. | 2771496 | 1002590 |
| 2020-09-10 | Chiroptera | Vespertilionidae | Laephotis kirinyaga | East African serotine | | AF | 2°18′32″N 38°00′00″E | Tropical montane seasonal mixed forest (~1280 m a.s.l.) at the Marsabit National Park, ~1.3 km SE of the park's headquarters, Marsabit County, C Kenya. | 2015-07-27 | sp. | 2778571 | 1005732 |
| 2020-09-10 | Chiroptera | Vespertilionidae | Pseudoromicia kityoi | Kityo's serotine | | AF | 0°26′42″N 32°53′20″E | Cultivated gardens directly adjacent to the Mabira Forest (~1130 m a.s.l.), ~0.79 km NE of the Nagojje town center, Mukono District, Central Region, C Uganda. | 2012-10-19 | sp. | 2778568 | 1005772 |
| 2020-09-10 | Chiroptera | Vespertilionidae | Pseudoromicia nyanza | Nyanza serotine | | AF | 0°06′35″S 34°44′45″E | Tropical premontane seasonal woodland (~1130 m a.s.l.) on the NE shore of the Lake Victoria, Kisumu Impala Sanctuary, Kisumu County, W Kenya. | 2012-01-08 | sp. | 2778569 | 1005773 |
| 2020-09-10 | Rodentia | Muridae | Stenocephalemys sokolovi | Sokolov's Ethiopian rat | | AF | 9°49′37″N 39°44′07″E | Tropical montane dry forest patch (Chingawa Forest) (~3233 m a.s.l.), ~2.5 km SW of the town of Debre Sina, Amhara Region, C Ethiopia. | 2011-03-30 | sp. | 2776655 | 1006486 |
| 2020-09-10 | Rodentia | Muridae | Stenocephalemys zimai | Zima's Ethiopian rat | | AF | 13°15′00″N 38°13′00″E | Tropical montane grassland (~3800 m a.s.l.) in the vicinity of the Chennek campsite on the N slope of the Mt. Bwahit, Semien Mountains National Park, Amhara Region, N Ethiopia. | 2005-05-14 | sp. | 2776656 | 1006487 |
| 2020-09-30 | Chiroptera | Vespertilionidae | Myotis armiensis | Armién's myotis | | NT | 8°53′N 82°37′W | Tropical montane moist evergreen forest (~2214 m a.s.l.) on the left bank of the Chiriquí Viejo River, at the Las Nubes Rangers Station, La Amistad International Park, Bugaba District, Chiriquí Province, W Panama. | 2012-03-20 | sp. | 2785030 | 1006489 |
| 2020-10-08 | Rodentia | Muridae | Colomys lumumbai | Congo wading rat | | AF | 5°53′S 22°25′E | Tropical upland moist semi-evergreen woodland (~640 m a.s.l.) on the right bank of the Lulua River, at the city of Kananga, Kasaï-Central, S DR Congo. | 1923-06-20 | sp. | 2866652 | 1006493 |
| 2020-10-08 | Rodentia | Muridae | Colomys wologizi | Wologizi wading rat | | AF | 8°07′48″N 9°28′34″W | Tropical upland seasonal evergreen forest (~560 m a.s.l.) on the foot of the Wonegizi Mts., ~10 km NNE of the settlement of Zigida, Lofa County, N Liberia. | 1990-03-12 | sp. | 2866653 | 1006494 |
| 2020-10-27 | Eulipotyphla | Talpidae | Talpa levantis dogramacii | Levant mole (dogramacii) | | PA | 39°57′38″N 29°15′48″E | Agricultural area close to the disturbed temperate montane conifer-broadleaf forest (~1100 m a.s.l.) on the foot of the Mt. Uludağ, ~3 km E of the village of Baraklı, Keles District, Bursa Province, W Turkey. | 2019-03 | ssp. | 2750696 | 1004340 |
| 2020-11-10 | Rodentia | Cricetidae | Pattonimus ecominga | Ecominga montane rat | | NT | 0°53′31″N 78°12′11″W | Tropical montane moist forest (~1700 m a.s.l.) at Gualpilal, 12 km of the Gualpi road, Drácula Nature Reserve, ~5 km SSW of the locality of Chical, Tulcán Canton, Carchi, NE Ecuador. | 2019-04-14 | sp. | | 1006504 |
| 2020-11-10 | Rodentia | Cricetidae | Pattonimus musseri | Musser's montane rat | | NT | 0°18′34″N 78°51′24″W | Tropical montane moist forest (~1200 m a.s.l.) on the right bank of a steam, Río Manduriacu Reserve, Cotacachi Canton, Imbabura Province, N Ecuador. | 2017-04-12 | sp. | | 1006505 |
| 2020-11-11 | Primates | Cercopithecidae | Trachypithecus popa | Popa langur | | IM | 20°55′00″N 95°15′00″E | Tropical montane dry mixed forest (~1512 m a.s.l.) on the Mt. Popa, Myingyan District, Mandalay Region, C Myanmar | 1913-09-11 | sp. | | 1006508 |
| 2020-11-13 | Eulipotyphla | Soricidae | Crocidura makeda | Makeda white-toothed shrew | | AF | 10°51′00″N 38°47′37″E | Tropical montane dry evergreen shrubland (~3198 m a.s.l.) at the Borena Sayint National Park, ~20 km S of the settlement of Ajibar, Sayint District, South Wollo Zone, Amhara Region, NW Ethiopia. | 2018-11-10 | sp. | 2794852 | 1006509 |
| 2020-11-13 | Eulipotyphla | Soricidae | Crocidura similiturba | Medabo white-toothed shrew | | AF | 7°33′47″N 36°02′59″E | Shrubby edge of the tropical montane moist evergreen forest (~1563 m a.s.l.) near the village of Medabo, Gewata, Gewata District, Keffa Zone, South West Region, SW Ethiopia. | 2018-12-08 | sp. | 2794853 | 1006510 |
| 2020-11-24 | Rodentia | Platacanthomyidae | Typhlomys huangshanensis | Huangshan tree mouse | | PA | 30°07′08″N 118°18′22″E | Temperate upland semi-deciduous mixed forest (~710 m a.s.l.) at the Monkey Valley of the Huangshan Mts., ~13 km NE of the town of Tangkou, Huangshan Prefecture, Anhui Province, SE China. | 2019-02-12 | sp. | 2720086 | 1006513 |
| 2020-12-01 | Rodentia | Cricetidae | Neacomys auriventer | Golden-bellied bristly mouse | | NT | 3°55′04″S 78°29′34″W | Tropical montane seasonal evergreen forest (~1885 m a.s.l.) at Paquisha Alto, ~19 km E of the town of Paquisha, Paquisha Canton, Zamora-Chinchipe Province, S Ecuador. | 2011-09-11 | sp. | 2844896 | 1006556 |
| 2020-12-02 | Didelphimorphia | Didelphidae | Marmosops marina | Silva's slender opossum | | NT | 9°37′36″S 56°04′46″W | Tropical lowland seasonal semi-deciduous broadleaf forest (~240 m a.s.l.) at Fazenda São José, right bank of the Teles Pires River, ~25 km N of the town of Alta Floresta, Mato Grosso State, C Brazil. | 2014-05-07 | sp. | 2974306 | 1006511 |
| 2020-12-10 | Rodentia | Octodontidae | Octodon ricardojeda | Ricardo Ojeda's degu | | NT | 39°54′18″S 71°19′32″W | Temperate montane seasonal semi-deciduous mixed forest (~1050 m a.s.l.) on the left bank of Currhué River, E of the Lake Curruhué Chico, Lanín National Park, ~21 km NWW of the town of Junín de los Andes, Huiliches Department, Neuquén Province, SW Argentina. | | sp. | 2819239 | 1006516 |
| 2021-01-08 | Eulipotyphla | Talpidae | Alpiscaptulus medogensis | Medog mole | | PA | 29°44′32″N 95°40′59″E | Temperate montane heathland (~3650 m a.s.l.) in the vicinity of the NE part of the Namcha Barwa Himal range, ~35 km NE of settlement of Damu, Mêdog County, Nyingchi Prefecture, TAR, SW China. | 2019-06-02 | sp. | | 1006519 |
| 2021-01-10 | Artiodactyla | Balaenopteridae | Balaenoptera ricei | Rice's whale | | NT | 25°02′04″N 81°01′07″W | Tropical waters of NW Atlantic, near the island of Sandy Key in the Florida Bay, ~14 km SW of Flamingo, Monroe, Florida, SE US | 2019-01-29 | sp. | 2746895 | 1006521 |
| 2021-01-12 | Rodentia | Sminthidae | Sicista talgarica | Talgar birch mouse | | PA | 43°16′N 77°19′E | Temperate montane semi-deciduous conifer-broadleaf woodland (~1650 m a.s.l.) on the right side of the Talgar River valley in Trans-Ili Alatau, Almaty Natural Reserve, SE of the town of Talgar, Talgar District, Almaty Region, SE Kazakhstan. | 1987 | sp. | | 1006525 |
| 2021-01-12 | Rodentia | Sminthidae | Sicista terskeica | Terskey birch mouse | | PA | 42°15′04″N 78°09′33″E | Temperate montane conifer woodland (~2700 m a.s.l.) dominated by Picea schrenkiana and located in the Chon-Kyzyl-Su River valley, Terskey Alatau, ~20 km SW of the village of Jeti-Ögüz, Jeti-Ögüz District, Issyk-Kul Region, E Kyrgyzstan. | 1977-06-20 | sp. | | 1006526 |
| 2021-01-13 | Chiroptera | Vespertilionidae | Myotis nimbaensis | Nimba myotis | | AF | 7°39′54″N 8°22′20″W | Mine adit named "Kaiser Adit 1" surrounded by the tropical montane seasonal forest (~1500 m a.s.l.) in the Nimba Mts., Mount Nimba Strict Nature Reserve, ~6 km SWW of the town of N'Zoo, Lola Prefecture, Nzérékoré Region, SE Guinea. | 2018-02-02 | sp. | 2804329 | 1006522 |
| 2021-01-29 | Chiroptera | Phyllostomidae | Vampyressa voragine | Voragine's yellow-eared bat | | NT | 5°15′12″N 72°51′47″W | Tropical montane seasonal evergreen broadleaf forest edge (~1500 m a.s.l.) at the La Garantía Farm, ~4 km NNE of the town of Chámeza, Casanare Department, C Colombia. | 2015-04-12 | sp. | | 1006529 |
| 2021-02-02 | Rodentia | Cricetidae | Neacomys serranensis | Serrano bristly mouse | | NT | 6°41′05″N 73°26′10″W | Tropical montane moist evergreen broadleaf forest (~1595 m a.s.l.) in the basin of the La San Guillerma stream, W slope of the Yariguíes Mts., ~8 km SEE of the town of El Carmen de Chucurí, Santander Department, NE Colombia. | 2018-02-28 | sp. | | 1006531 |
| 2021-02-22 | Chiroptera | Molossidae | Cynomops kuizha | Awa dog-faced bat | | NT | 4°39′00″N 75°56′00″W | Agricultural area (~930 m a.s.l.) at Hacienda Jamaica adjacent to the remnants of the tropical montane dry broadleaf forest, corregimiento Cruces, ~8.5 km NE of the town of Obando, Valle del Cauca Department, W Colombia. | 1978-06 | sp. | 2850156 | 1006540 |
| 2021-02-23 | Chiroptera | Vespertilionidae | Histiotus cadenai | Cadena-García's big-eared brown bat | | NT | 5°04′09″N 75°22′38″W | Tropical montane moist evergreen forest (~3500 m a.s.l.) at the finca of Martinica, Río Blanco Ecological Reserve, ~11 km E of the city of Manizales, Caldas Department, C Colombia. | 2004-02-06 | sp. | | 1006538 |
| 2021-03-03 | Rodentia | Octodontidae | Octodon degus molinai | Molina's degu | | NT | 30°44′02″S 71°41′11″W | Temperate coastal semi-arid shrubland (~120 m a.s.l.) at the mouth of the Limarí River, ~46 km SWW of the city of Ovalle, Coquimbo Region, C Chile. | 2018-05-25 | ssp. | | 1001494 |
| 2021-03-17 | Rodentia | Cricetidae | Akodon kadiweu | Kadiwéu grass mouse | | NT | 20°42′S 56°51′W | Tropical upland dry semi-deciduous forest patch (~520 m a.s.l.) at Fazenda Califórnia, Serra da Bodoquena National Park, ~23 km SW of the town of Bodoquena, Bodoquena Municipality, Mato Grosso do Sul State, SW Brazil. | 2002-04-19 | sp. | 2823130 | 1006545 |
| 2021-03-17 | Rodentia | Cricetidae | Lemmus lemmus chernovi | Novaya Zemlya lemming | | PA | 72°22′56″N 52°45′02″E | Saxifrage-roseroot communities of the arctic coastal wet tundra (~17 m a.s.l.) in the W part of the island of Yuzhny (Novaya Zemlya archipelago), ~1.5 km NE of the polar station of Malye Karmakuly, Arkhangelsk Region, N Russia. | 2015-07-23 | ssp. | | 1002141 |
| 2021-03-17 | Lagomorpha | Ochotonidae | Ochotona hyperborea fedoseevi | Northern pika (fedoseevi) | | PA | 51°18′04″N 134°19′59″E | Temperate montane conifer forest (~1400 m a.s.l.) on the S shore of the Lake Bolshoy Suluk, Bureya Range, Khabarovsk Krai, SE Russia. | 2014-09-12 | ssp. | | 1001162 |
| 2021-03-17 | Rodentia | Cricetidae | Oecomys matogrossensis | Mato Grosso arboreal rice rat | | NT | 10°00′25″S 56°02′17″W | Agricultural area (~200 m a.s.l.) at Estância Santa Clara surrounded by the remnants of the tropical lowland moist evergreen forest, ~10 km SE of the town of Alta Floresta, Mato Grosso, C Brazil. | 2014-05-12 | sp. | 2829237 | 1006544 |
| 2021-03-17 | Rodentia | Cricetidae | Rhagomys septentrionalis | Northern arboreal mouse | | NT | 3°48′13″S 78°30′10″W | Tropical montane moist evergreen broadleaf forest (~1442 m a.s.l.) on the right bank of the Blanco River on the W part of the Cóndor Mts., El Zarza Wildlife Refuge, ~16 km SWW of the locality of Los Encuentros, Zamora-Chinchipe Province, SE Ecuador. | 2008-11-06 | sp. | | 1006546 |
| 2021-03-19 | Macroscelidea | Macroscelididae | Rhynchocyon chrysopygus mandelai | Golden-rumped sengi | | AF | 1°45′04″S 41°10′19″E | tropical lowland moist woodland (~10 m a.s.l.) at the Boni National Reserve, near the village of Mangai, Lamu County, SE Kenya. | 2009-09-22 | ssp. | 2811915 | 1000460 |
| 2021-03-31 | Chiroptera | Vespertilionidae | Hypsugo savii stubbei | Savi's pipistrelle (stubbei) | | PA | 48°20′00″N 92°47′55″E | Temperate montane semi-arid grassland (~1200 m a.s.l.) on the bank of the stream named Chono Harayh Gol, near NE shore of the Khar-Us Lake, ~9 km E of the locality of Seer, Khovd Province, W Mongolia. | 2002-08-25 | ssp. | 2917788 | 1005727 |
| 2021-04-01 | Didelphimorphia | Didelphidae | Marmosa jansae | Jansa's woolly mouse opossum | | NT | 0°41′S 76°26′W | Tropical lowland moist evergreen broadleaf forest (~250 m a.s.l.) at the Yasuní National Park, ~32 km SE of the settlement of the Pompeya Sur, Orellana Province, Ecuador." | 2006-05-29 | sp. | 3136102 | 1006548 |
| 2021-04-22 | Rodentia | Cricetidae | Oligoryzomys guille | D'Elía's pygmy rice rat | | NT | 11°39′00″S 76°14′00″W | Tropical montane semi-arid elfin woodland (~4200 m a.s.l.) dominated by Polylepis spp. and located on the W slope of the Andes, in the vicinity of the mine at the settlement of Casapalca, Huarochirí Province, Lima Department, SW Peru. | 1964-06-09 | sp. | | 1006549 |
| 2021-04-27 | Rodentia | Cricetidae | Thomasomys pardignasi | Pardiñas's oldfield mouse | | NT | 2°47′14″S 78°07′54″W | Tropical montane moist evergreen forest (~2215 m a.s.l.) in the Kutukú Mts., ~14 km SEE of the locality of Patuca, Santiago de Méndez Canton, Morona-Santiago Province, SE Ecuador. | 2017-09-10 | sp. | | 1006550 |
| 2021-04-28 | Eulipotyphla | Talpidae | Uropsilus dabieshanensis | Dabie Mountains shrew mole | | PA | 31°07′08″N 116°14′42″E | Temperate montane mixed forest (~1064 m a.s.l.) in the Dabie Mts., Foziling Nature Reserve, ~7 km SWW of the town of Huangwei Township, Yuexi County, Yuexi County, Anqing Prefecture, Anhui Province, SE China. | 2018-07 | sp. | 2762481 | 1006551 |
| 2021-05-03 | Eulipotyphla | Soricidae | Crocidura narcondamica | Narcondam white-toothed shrew | | IM | 13°27′17″N 94°16′26″E | Tropical coastal moist evergreen forest (~11 m a.s.l.) on the small volcanic island of Narcondam in the Bay of Bengal, Andaman and Nicobar Islands UT, East India Region, SE India. | 2020-04-17 | sp. | | 1006552 |
| 2021-05-19 | Chiroptera | Vespertilionidae | Nyctophilus holtorum | Holts' long-eared bat | | AU | 32°47′54″S 116°00′53″E | Temperate lowland evergreen forest (~210 m a.s.l.) dominated by Eucalyptus marginata, Lane Poole Reserve, ~10 km NE of the town of Waroona, Western Australia, SW Australia. | 2007-11-27 | sp. | 2720897 | 1006554 |
| 2021-05-31 | Rodentia | Sciuridae | Eupetaurus nivamons | Yunnan woolly flying squirrel | | PA | 27°53′24″N 98°45′44″E | Temperate montane wet shrubland (~3700 m a.s.l.) dominated by Juniperus squamata and located on the slope of the Mt. Biluo, near the spine of the Gaoligong range, ~5.5 km E of the village of Nageluo, Gongshan County, Nujiang Prefecture, Yunnan Province, C China. | 2017-01 | sp. | 2972969 | 1006562 |
| 2021-05-31 | Rodentia | Sciuridae | Eupetaurus tibetensis | Tibetan woolly flying squirrel | | PA | 28°55′09″N 89°36′49″E | Temperate montane semi-arid shrubland (~4000 m a.s.l.) near the town of Gyantse, Gyantse County, Shigatse Prefecture, TAR, SW China. | 1909-06 | sp. | | 1006563 |
| 2021-06-03 | Rodentia | Cricetidae | Neacomys leilae | Leila Pessôa's bristly mouse | | NT | 10°32′00″N 66°54′00″W | Tropical montane seasonal semi-deciduous mixed forest (~1470 m a.s.l.) on the S slopes of the Venezuelan Coastal Range, Los Venados sector of the El Ávila National Park, N of the city of Caracas, Capital District, N Venezuela. | 1965-08-12 | sp. | | 1006564 |
| 2021-06-03 | Rodentia | Cricetidae | Neacomys oliveirai | João Oliveira's bristly mouse | | NT | 6°02′49″S 50°15′41″W | Tropical upland moist evergreen forest (~654 m a.s.l.) at the Carajás National Forest, ~14 km SE of the locality of Vila Paulo Fonteles, Paraopeba Municipality, Pará State, C Brazil. | 2008-10-27 | sp. | | 1006565 |
| 2021-06-15 | Hyracoidea | Procaviidae | Dendrohyrax interfluvialis | Benin tree hyrax | | AF | 6°47′00″N 3°04′00″E | Agricultural area surrounded by the tropical lowland moist evergreen broadleaf forest (~70 m a.s.l.), Ilaro Forest Reserve, ~10 SE of the town of Ilaro, Ogun State, SW Nigeria. | | sp. | 2872343 | 1006570 |
| 2021-07-05 | Rodentia | Cricetidae | Oxymycterus willkaurco | Cusco hocicudo | | NT | 13°05′04″S 72°07′17″W | Tropical montane wet grassland (~3850 m a.s.l.) at the locality of Chupani, ~8 km NW of the town of Lares, Lares District, Calca Province, Cusco Department, S Peru. | 2002-08-12 | sp. | 2956715 | 1006558 |
| 2021-07-09 | Chiroptera | Rhinolophidae | Rhinolophus yonghoiseni | Yong Hoi Sen's woolly horseshoe bat | | IM | 3°19′29″N 101°45′12″E | Tropical lowland moist evergreen forest (~300 m a.s.l.) in the SW part of the Malay Peninsula, near the Ulu Gombak Field Studies Centre, Selangor State, SW Malaysia. | 1992-04 | sp. | 2952509 | 1006573 |
| 2021-07-14 | Rodentia | Muridae | Chingawaemys rarus | Chingawa forest rat | | AF | 7°25′00″N 35°24′00″E | Tropical montane evergreen forest (~2340 m a.s.l.) named Chingawa Forest, ~23 km N of the town of Tepi, Sheka Zone, Southwest Region, SW Ethiopia. | 2007-05-05 | sp. | | 1006574 |
| 2021-07-29 | Chiroptera | Vespertilionidae | Neoeptesicus langeri | Langer's serotine | | NT | 18°13′11″S 63°47′50″W | Tropical montane seasonal semi-deciduous forest edge (~2020 m a.s.l.) characterized by Parapiptadenia excelsa and Tipuana tipu, near the locality El Cedral-Agua Rica, ~9 km SE of the town of Samaipata, Florida Province, Santa Cruz Department, C Bolivia. | 2013-12-01 | sp. | | 1006578 |
| 2021-08-02 | Primates | Callitrichidae | Mico schneideri | Schneider's marmoset | | NT | 9°41′21″S 56°29′10″W | Remnants of the tropical lowland moist evergreen forest (~300 m a.s.l.) on the left margin of the Teles Pires River, ~2 km SW of town of Paranaíta, Mato Grosso State, C Brazil. | 2016-04-02 | sp. | 2850016 | 1006579 |
| 2021-08-11 | Chiroptera | Molossidae | Molossus melini | Melin's mastiff bat | | NT | 33°45′03″S 61°24′25″W | Cultivated temperate lowland grassland (~90 m a.s.l.) at Estancia Laguna San Carlos, S shore of the Melincué Lake ~10 km S of the town of Melincué, General López Department, Santa Fe Province, C Argentina. | | sp. | 2834119 | 1006581 |
| 2021-08-13 | Chiroptera | Vespertilionidae | Neoeptesicus orinocensis | Orinoco serotine | | NT | 7°00′08″N 70°44′44″W | Tropical lowland monsoon grassland (~132 m a.s.l.) near the Orinoquia campus of the National University of Colombia, ~9 km S of the town of Arauquita, Arauca Department, NE Colombia. | 2019-07-27 | sp. | 3371126 | 1006597 |
| 2021-08-16 | Rodentia | Sciuridae | Callosciurus finlaysonii honnghensis | Hon Nghe squirrel | | IM | 10°02′01″N 104°33′15″E | Tropical lowland moist evergreen forest (~100 m a.s.l.) on the small rocky island of Hòn Nghệ, located in the SE part of the Gulf of Thailand, ~54 km W of the coastal city of Rạch Giá, An Giang Province, SW Vietnam. | 2019-05-06 | ssp. | | 1001539 |
| 2021-08-30 | Rodentia | Cricetidae | Thomasomys antoniobracki | Antonio Brack's oldfield mouse | | NT | 4°53′39″S 79°22′03″W | Tropical montane moist broadleaf forest (~2630 m a.s.l.) at Campamento Alto Parramata, ~29 km NNE of the settlement of Sapalache, El Carmen de la Frontera District, Huancabamba Province, Piura Department, NW Peru. | 2006-04-15 | sp. | 2950095 | 1006584 |
| 2021-08-31 | Rodentia | Cricetidae | Nephelomys ricardopalmai | Ricardo Palma's rice rat | | NT | 6°23′04″S 77°59′18″W | tropical montane moist evergreen forest (~2781 m a.s.l.) at the Huiquilla Private Conservation Area, ~4 km NW of the town of Longuita, Longuita District, Luya Province, Amazonas Department, NW Peru. | 2016-05-08 | sp. | 2904038 | 1006583 |
| 2021-09-09 | Rodentia | Muridae | Bullimus carletoni | Carleton's forest rat | | IM | 13°47′39″N 123°52′44″E | Disturbed tropical lowland moist broadleaf forest (~50 m a.s.l.) in the SE part of the island of Luzon, Caramoan National Park, ~2.5 km of the town of Caramoan, Camarines Sur Province, Bicol Region, C Philippines. | 2008-05-29 | sp. | | 1006589 |
| 2021-10-13 | Chiroptera | Vespertilionidae | Histiotus mochica | Moche big-eared brown bat | | NT | 4°31′41″S 81°12′09″W | Tropical lowland dry woodland (~73 m a.s.l.) in the Pariñas ravine, ~9.6 km NE of the coastal city of Talara, Talara Province, Piura Department, NW Peru. | 2012-10-21 | sp. | 2969768 | 1006588 |
| 2021-10-26 | Rodentia | Caviidae | Microcavia sorojchi | Sorojchi mountain cavy | | NT | 24°11′46″S 66°27′46″W | Subtropical montane arid grassland (~4700 m a.s.l.) near the locality of Chorrillos, ~14 km W of the town of San Antonio de los Cobres, Los Andes Department, Salta Province, N Argentina. | 1930-02 | sp. | | 1006598 |
| 2021-10-27 | Artiodactyla | Ziphiidae | Mesoplodon eueu | Ramari's beaked whale | | AU | 43°58′43″S 168°46′50″E | Temperate waters of SE Australasia. The perished whale had been found ashore on Waiatoto Spit, SW of the town of Haast, Westland District, South Island, New Zealand. | 2011-11-27 | sp. | 2878263 | 1006592 |
| 2021-10-28 | Rodentia | Cricetidae | Neacomys aletheia | Upper Juruá bristly mouse | | NT | 6°45′S 70°51′W | Tropical lowland moist evergreen forest on the bank of the upper Juruá River (~150 m a.s.l.), at Sacado (Condor), ~98 km NE of the town of Ipixuna, Amazonas State, NW Brazil. | 1991-09-28 | sp. | | 1006593 |
| 2021-10-28 | Rodentia | Cricetidae | Neacomys elieceri | Eliécer's bristly mouse | | NT | 2°09′00″S 56°05′00″W | Tropical lowland moist evergreen forest (~35 m a.s.l.) on the right bank of the lower Amazon River, at the town of Juruti, Pará State, N Brazil. | 2013-06-16 | sp. | 3370357 | 1006594 |
| 2021-10-28 | Rodentia | Cricetidae | Neacomys jau | Jaú bristly mouse | | NT | 1°58′S 61°29′W | Tropical lowland moist evergreen forest (~50 m a.s.l.) on the right bank of the Jaú River, ~94 km NW of the town of Novo Airão, Amazonas, N Brazil. | 1996-11-10 | sp. | | 1006595 |
| 2021-11-09 | Rodentia | Ctenomyidae | Ctenomys plebiscitum | Plebiscite tuco-tuco | | NT | 42°52′21″S 71°20′09″W | Temperate premontane semi-arid shrubland (~800 m a.s.l.) adjacent to the Laguna La Zeta Urban Nature Reserve, ~3 km N of the town of Esquel, Futaleufú Department, Chubut Province, SW Argentina. | 2019-10-02 | sp. | 2942186 | 1006599 |
| 2021-11-15 | Rodentia | Calomyscidae | Calomyscus behzadi | Behzad's brush-tailed mouse | | PA | 33°38′N 46°32′E | Temperate montane semi-arid shrubland (~2073 m a.s.l.) on the W slope of the Ghelarang Range in the W part of the Zagros Mts., Manesht & Ghelarang Protected Area, ~11 km E of the city center of Ilam, Ilam Province, SW Iran. | 2017-08-15 | sp. | 3033997 | 1006688 |
| 2021-11-25 | Chiroptera | Vespertilionidae | Myotis pampa | Pampas myotis | | NT | 30°37′00″S 57°50′00″W | Subtropical lowland seasonal woodland (~32 m a.s.l.) on the left bank of the Uruguay River, ~15 km SWW of the village of Colonia Palma, Artigas Department, NW Uruguay. | 1963-01 | sp. | | 1006603 |
| 2021-12-01 | Chiroptera | Vespertilionidae | Plecotus gobiensis | Gobi long-eared bat | | PA | 43°35′03″N 100°04′06″E | Temperate montane xeric shrubland (~1200 m a.s.l.) at the Zulganai Oasis in the NW part on the Gobi Desert, ~87.5 km NW of the settlement of Gurvantes, Ömnögovi Province, S Mongolia. | 2005-09-06 | sp. | 2918439 | 1006638 |
| 2021-12-01 | Chiroptera | Vespertilionidae | Plecotus ognevi nomrogi | Ognev's long-eared bat (nomrogi) | | PA | 47°00′07″N 119°22′11″E | Temperate montane semi-arid forest steppe (~900 m a.s.l.) on the left bank of the Numrug River, ~89 km SE of the town of Khalkhgol, Dornod Province, E Mongolia. | 2008-06-07 | ssp. | 2917802 | 1005671 |
| 2021-12-08 | Didelphimorphia | Didelphidae | Marmosa adleri | Adler's woolly mouse opossum | | NT | 9°10′N 79°45′W | Tropical lowland moist evergreen forest (~150 m a.s.l.), located ~1 km N of the Río Mendoza on Pipeline Road in the Soberanía National Park, ~11 km SE of the town of Limón, Colón Province, C Panama. | 2001-01-14 | sp. | | 1006605 |
| 2021-12-14 | Eulipotyphla | Soricidae | Crocidura australis | Southwest Peninsula white-toothed shrew | | AU | 5°18′30″S 119°56′55″E | Tropical montane moist forest (~2400 m a.s.l.) on the NE slope of the Mt. Bawakaraeng in the SW part of the island of Sulawesi, ~4 km SW of the village of Gunung Perak, Sinjai, Sinjai Regency, South Sulawesi, C Indonesia. | 2016-10-30 | sp. | 2873330 | 1006614 |
| 2021-12-14 | Eulipotyphla | Soricidae | Crocidura baletei | Balete's white-toothed shrew | | AU | 1°06′22″N 120°56′19″E | Tropical montane moist forest (~1600 m a.s.l.) in the N foothills of the Mt. Dako in the N part of the island of Sulawesi, ~8 km E of the village of Malangga, Tolitoli Regency, Central Sulawesi, C Indonesia. | 2013-03-10 | sp. | 2873331 | 1006616 |
| 2021-12-14 | Eulipotyphla | Soricidae | Crocidura brevicauda | Short-tailed white-toothed shrew | | AU | 3°25′52″S 120°05′40″E | Tropical montane moist forest (~2518 m a.s.l.) in the SE foothills of the Mt. Latimojong, ~3 km SW of the village of Gamaru, Latimojong District, Luwu Regency, South Sulawesi, C Indonesia. | 2016-08-12 | sp. | 2873332 | 1006620 |
| 2021-12-14 | Eulipotyphla | Soricidae | Crocidura caudicrassa | Thick-tailed Sulawesi white-toothed shrew | | AU | 2°50′43″S 119°22′56″E | Tropical montane moist forest (~2600 m a.s.l.) on the trail to the summit of Mt. Gandang Dewata, Gandang Dewata National Park, ~7.5 km N of the village of Rantepongko, Mamasa Regency, West Sulawesi, C Indonesia. | 2011-10-28 | sp. | 2873333 | 1006621 |
| 2021-12-14 | Eulipotyphla | Soricidae | Crocidura mediocris | Central Sulawesi white-toothed shrew | | AU | 2°30′00″S 120°29′14″E | Tropical montane moist forest (~862 m a.s.l.) on the SE slope of the Mt. Buyu Balease, ~11 km NW of the town of Sukamaju, Luwu Regency, South Sulawesi, C Indonesia. | 2010-10-22 | sp. | 2873334 | 1006618 |
| 2021-12-14 | Eulipotyphla | Soricidae | Crocidura microelongata | Small elongated white-toothed shrew | | AU | 3°24′27″S 120°00′28″E | Tropical montane moist forest (~2050 m a.s.l.) on the SW slope of the Mt. Latimojong, ~2.5 NE of the village of Latimojong, Enrekang Regency, South Sulawesi, C Indonesia. | 2011-03-01 | sp. | 2873335 | 1006611 |
| 2021-12-14 | Eulipotyphla | Soricidae | Crocidura normalis | Typical Sulawesi white-toothed shrew | | AU | 1°17′18″S 120°18′37″E | Tropical montane moist forest (~2250 m a.s.l.) on the S slope of the Mt. Rore Kautimbu, Lore Lindu National Park, ~6 km NNW of the village of Sedoa, Poso Regency, Central Sulawesi, C Indonesia. | 2011-03-27 | sp. | 2873336 | 1006622 |
| 2021-12-14 | Eulipotyphla | Soricidae | Crocidura ordinaria | West Sulawesi white-toothed shrew | | AU | 2°49′05″S 119°22′56″E | Tropical montane moist forest (~2200 m a.s.l.) on the trail to the summit of Mt. Gandang Dewata, Gandang Dewata National Park, ~10 km N of the village of Rantepongko, Mamasa Regency, West Sulawesi, C Indonesia. | 2012-05-05 | sp. | 2873337 | 1006623 |
| 2021-12-14 | Eulipotyphla | Soricidae | Crocidura pallida | Pallid-footed white-toothed shrew | | AU | 2°29′58″S 120°29′15″E | Tropical montane moist forest (~900 m a.s.l.) on the SE slope of the Mt. Buyu Balease, ~11 km NW of the town of Sukamaju, Luwu Regency, South Sulawesi, C Indonesia. | 2010-10-18 | sp. | 2873338 | 1006615 |
| 2021-12-14 | Eulipotyphla | Soricidae | Crocidura parva | Tiny Sulawesi white-toothed shrew | | AU | 5°17′13″S 119°57′41″E | Tropical montane moist forest (~1725 m a.s.l.) on the NE slope of the Mt. Bawakaraeng, ~1.5 km W of the village of Gunung Perak, Sinjai Regency, South Sulawesi, C Indonesia. | 2016-10-18 | sp. | 2873339 | 1006619 |
| 2021-12-14 | Eulipotyphla | Soricidae | Crocidura pseudorhoditis | North Peninsula white-toothed shrew | | AU | 0°45′50″N 124°24′43″E | Tropical montane moist forest (~1481 m a.s.l.) in the E foothills of the Mt. Ambang, ~4 km SW of the village of Insil, Bolaang Mongondow Regency, North Sulawesi, C Indonesia. | 2016-02-22 | sp. | | 1006613 |
| 2021-12-14 | Eulipotyphla | Soricidae | Crocidura quasielongata | Southern elongated white-toothed shrew | | AU | 1°06′36″N 120°54′12″E | Tropical montane moist forest (~1600 m a.s.l.) in the NW foothills of the Mt. Dako, ~4 km E of the village of Malangga, Tolitoli Regency, Central Sulawesi, C Indonesia. | 2013-03-15 | sp. | 2873341 | 1006612 |
| 2021-12-14 | Eulipotyphla | Soricidae | Crocidura solita | West-central Sulawesi white-toothed shrew | | AU | 3°24′27″S 120°00′28″E | Tropical montane moist forest (~2050 m a.s.l.) on the SW slope of the Mt. Latimojong, ~2.5 NE of the village of Latimojong, Enrekang Regency, South Sulawesi, C Indonesia. | 2011-03-01 | sp. | 2873342 | 1006624 |
| 2021-12-14 | Eulipotyphla | Soricidae | Crocidura tenebrosa | Dark white-toothed shrew | | AU | 0°45′50″N 124°24′43″E | Tropical montane moist forest (~1481 m a.s.l.) in the E foothills of the Mt. Ambang, ~4 km SW of the village of Insil, Bolaang Mongondow Regency, North Sulawesi, C Indonesia. | 2016-02-21 | sp. | 2873343 | 1006617 |
| 2021-12-28 | Chiroptera | Vespertilionidae | Myotis moratellii | Moratelli's myotis | | NT | 1°31′08″S 79°42′48″W | Remnants of the tropical lowland moist forest (~15 m a.s.l.) on the left bank of the Vinces River, ~3 km NE of the locality of Puerto Nuevo (a suburb of the city of Vinces), Vinces Canton, Los Ríos Province, W Ecuador. | 1976-07-22 | sp. | 2910751 | 1006604 |
| 2021-12-28 | Rodentia | Cricetidae | Peromyscus ensinki | Ensink's deermouse | | NT | 19°50′07″N 100°47′44″W | Tropical montane dry mixed woodland (~2012 m a.s.l.) at the settlement of Santa Cruz, ~4 km SE of the town of Zinapécuaro de Figueroa, Michoacán, W Mexico. | 2008-07-25 | sp. | 2929996 | 1006609 |
| 2021-12-28 | Rodentia | Cricetidae | Peromyscus greenbaumi | Greenbaum's deermouse | | NT | 18°47′26″N 103°02′14″W | Tropical montane mixed forest (~2408 m a.s.l.) in the vicinity of the Mt. Cerro Las Conchas, ~11.8 km SWW of the settlement of Dos Aguas, Aguililla, W Mexico. | 1983-07-26 | sp. | 2929995 | 1006610 |
| 2021-12-30 | Rodentia | Cricetidae | Holochilus oxe | Brazilian northeastern marsh rat | | NT | 9°13′S 35°52′W | Tropical upland moist broadleaf forest patch (~550 m a.s.l.) at the Murici Ecological Station, ~13 SW of the town of Joaquim Gomes, Alagoas, E Brazil. | | sp. | | 1006587 |

== See also ==
- List of bird species described in the 2020s
- American Society of Mammalogists
