= Maria Nazareth F. da Silva =

Brazilian zoologist

Maria Nazareth Ferreira da Silva is a zoologist from Manaus, Brazil. She serves as curator of the mammal collection at Brazil's National Institute of Amazonian Research.

Da Silva has, for many years, specialised in the study of Amazonian mammals. She has described several new species of mammals, most of which are rodents:

- Metachirus aritanai, the Aritana's brown four-eyed opossum
- Saguinus kulina, the Kulinas' mustached tamarin
- Plecturocebus grovesi, the Alta Floresta titi
- Cacajao ayresi, the Aracá uakari
- Cacajao hosomi, the Neblina uakari
- Coendou ichillus, the Streaked dwarf porcupine
- Coendou roosmalenorum, the Roosmalen's dwarf porcupine
- Mesomys occultus, the Tufted-tailed spiny tree-rat
- Proechimys echinothrix, the Stiff-spine spiny rat
- Proechimys gardneri, the Gardner's spiny rat
- Proechimys kulinae, the Kulina spiny rat.
- Proechimys pattoni, the Patton's spiny rat
- Neacomys aletheia, the Upper Juruá bristly mouse
- Neacomys elieceri, the Eliécer's bristly mouse
- Neacomys jau, the Jaú bristly mouse
- Neacomys marajoara, the Marajó bristly mouse
- Neacomys minutus, the Minute bristly mouse
- Neacomys musseri, the Musser's bristly mouse
- Neacomys vossi, the Voss's bristly mouse
- Neacomys xingu, the Xingu bristly mouse
- Rhipidomys gardneri, the Gardner's climbing mouse

She has written, and contributed to, many papers and articles on the subject, and currently works for the National Institute of Amazonian Research.

== Selected publications ==
- Mammals of the Rio Juruá: Evolutionary and ecological diversification within Amazonia. (with Patton, J.L. and J.R. Malcolm) (pub.2000) Bull. Amer. Mus. Nat. Hist. 244:1-306
- Population Genetic Structure of two ecologically distinct Amazonian Spiny Rats:Separating History and Current Ecology (with Marjorie D. Matocq and James L. Patton)
- Definition of Species of Pouched Four-Eyed Opossums (Didelphidae, Philander) (with James L. Patton) Journal of Mammalogy, Vol. 78, No. 1 (Feb., 1997), pp. 90–102
- Rivers, Refuges, and Ridges: The Geography of Speciation of Amazonian Mammals (with James L. Patton)
- da Silva, M. N. F.; Langguth, A. (1989-11-27). "A New Record of Glironia venusta from the Lower Amazon, Brazil". Journal of Mammalogy. 70 (4): 873–875. doi:10.2307/1381733. ISSN 1545-1542.
- Da Silva, Maria Nazareth F.; Patton, James L. (1993). "Amazonian Phylogeography: mtDNA Sequence Variation in Arboreal Echimyid Rodents (Caviomorpha)". Molecular Phylogenetics and Evolution. 2 (3): 243–255. doi:10.1006/mpev.1993.1023.
- Patton, James L.; Silva, Maria Nazareth F.; Malcolm, Jay R. (1994). "GENE GENEALOGY AND DIFFERENTIATION AMONG ARBOREAL SPINY RATS (RODENTIA: ECHIMYIDAE) OF THE AMAZON BASIN: A TEST OF THE RIVERINE BARRIER HYPOTHESIS". Evolution. 48 (4): 1314–1323. doi:10.1111/j.1558-5646.1994.tb05315.x. ISSN 0014-3820.
- Da Silva, Maria Nazareth F.; Patton, James L. (1998). "Molecular phylogeography and the evolution and conservation of Amazonian mammals". Molecular Ecology. 7 (4): 475–486. doi:10.1046/j.1365-294x.1998.00276.x. ISSN 0962-1083.
- Patton, James L.; Da Silva, Maria Nazareth F.; Malcolm, Jay R. (2000). "MAMMALS OF THE RIO JURUÁ AND THE EVOLUTIONARY AND ECOLOGICAL DIVERSIFICATION OF AMAZONIA". Bulletin of the American Museum of Natural History. 244 (1): 1. doi:10.1206/0003-0090(2000)244<0001:MOTRJA>2.0.CO;2. ISSN 0003-0090.
