= Neacomys spinosus =

Conservation status
- Least Concern (IUCN 3.1)

Scientific classification
- Kingdom: Animalia
- Phylum: Chordata
- Class: Mammalia
- Order: Rodentia
- Family: Cricetidae
- Subfamily: Sigmodontinae
- Genus: Neacomys
- Species: N. spinosus

Binomial name
- Neacomys spinosus Thomas, 1882

Species of rodent

Neacomys spinosus, also known as the common neacomys, common bristly mouse, or bristly mouse, is a nocturnal rodent species from South America in the genus Neacomys. It is found in Bolivia, Brazil, Colombia, Ecuador and Peru, where it often lives in transition areas between lowland forest and open regions. Its diet consists of insects, seeds and fruit.

== Taxonomy ==
This species was first described by the British zoologist Oldfield Thomas in 1882. Three subspecies are recognised; N. s. spinosus, from the Andean foothills of Peru; N. s. carceloni, from the Andean foothills of Colombia and Ecuador; and N. s. amoenas, from the Amazon basin of western Brazil.

== Description ==
Neacomys spinosus is the largest mouse in the genus, with a head-and-body length of 75 to 105 mm (3.0 to 4.1 in). The dorsal colouring is variable, with individuals from the central and western parts of its range being pale yellowish-brown mixed with black, or dark reddish-brown, whereas those from further east, in Mato Grosso state, are a brighter, more ochre colour. There are short, grooved spines mixed in with the rather coarse fur on the back and the underparts are a pale colour. The skull is more robust than in other species in the genus and is long, with a relatively slender braincase.

== Distribution and habitat ==
N. spinosus has a very wide distribution encompassing much of the Amazon basin and the eastern foothills of the Andes. Its range extends from central and western Brazil to southeastern Colombia, eastern Ecuador, eastern Peru and central and northern Bolivia. It mostly inhabits moist lowland, broad-leafed, forest as well as forested hilly areas at elevations of up to 2,000 m (6,600 ft). It also occurs in more open locations on the edges of lowland forests, in secondary growth, in cultivated ground and gardens. In Brazil its range is shared with Neacomys minutus and Neacomys musseri.

== Ecology ==
This mouse is nocturnal and feeds on such things as seeds, fruits and insects. Breeding seems to take place throughout the year but may peak at the start of the wet season. The litter size varies from two to four young.

== Status ==
The species has a very wide range and is described as common. The population size exhibits large swings at different times of the year, but the mouse is tolerant of habitat modification and no particular threats have been recognised, so the International Union for Conservation of Nature has assessed its conservation status as being of "least concern".
