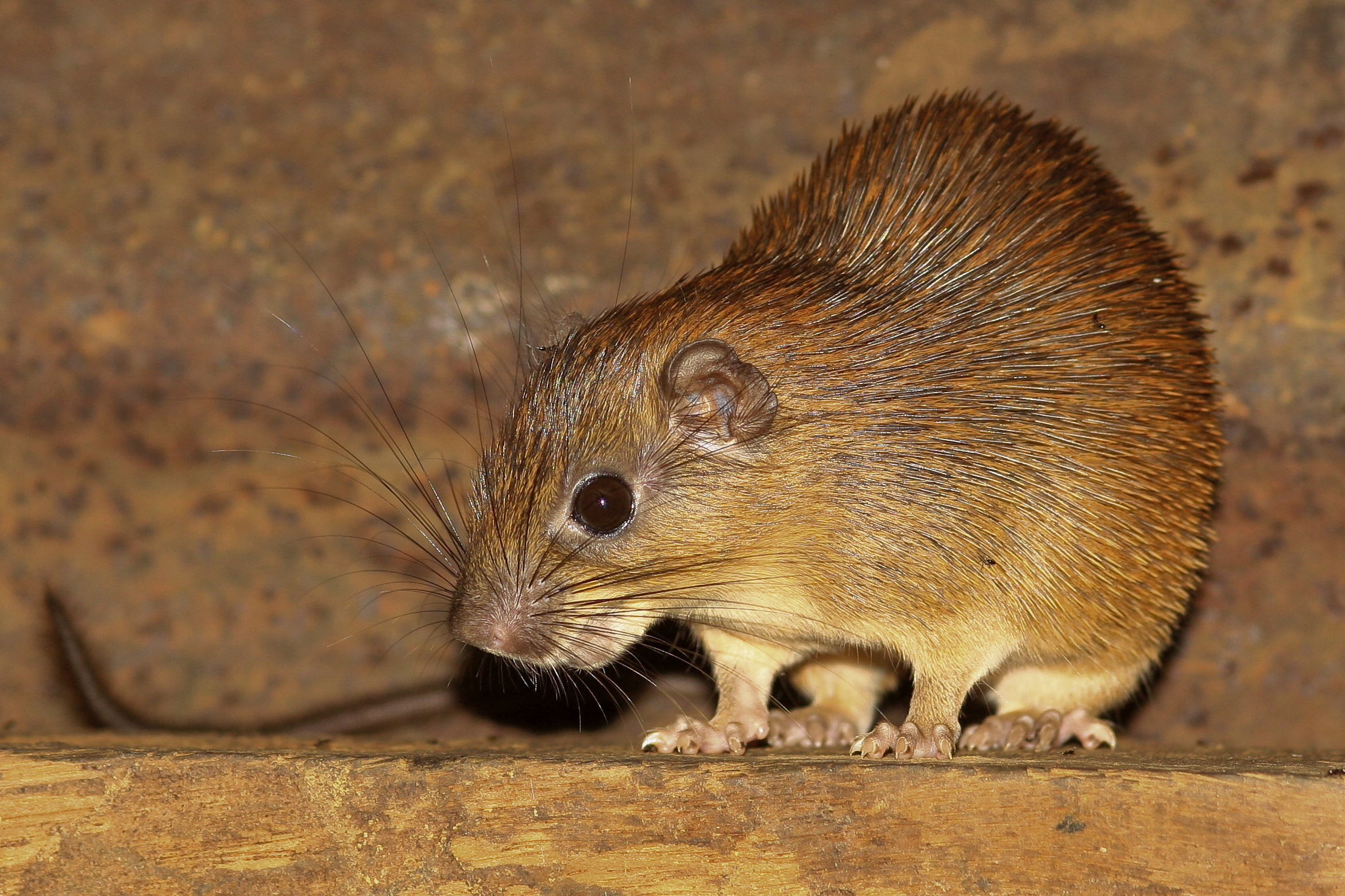
- Ferreira's spiny tree-rat

Scientific classification
- Kingdom: Animalia
- Phylum: Chordata
- Class: Mammalia
- Order: Rodentia
- Family: Echimyidae
- Subfamily: Echimyinae
- Tribe: Echimyini
- Genus: Mesomys; Wagner, 1845

Type species
- Mesomys ecaudatus Wagner, 1845 (= Echimys hispidus Desmarest, 1817)

Species
- Mesomys hispidus Mesomys leniceps Mesomys occultus Mesomys stimulax
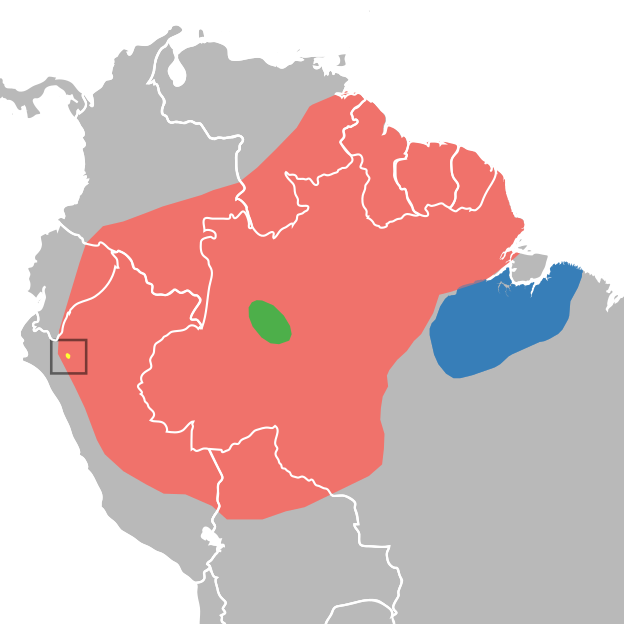
- Mesomys distribution M. hispidus in red, M. stimulax in blue, M. occultus in green, and M. leniceps in yellow (in box)

= Mesomys =

Genus of mammals belonging to the spiny rat family of rodents

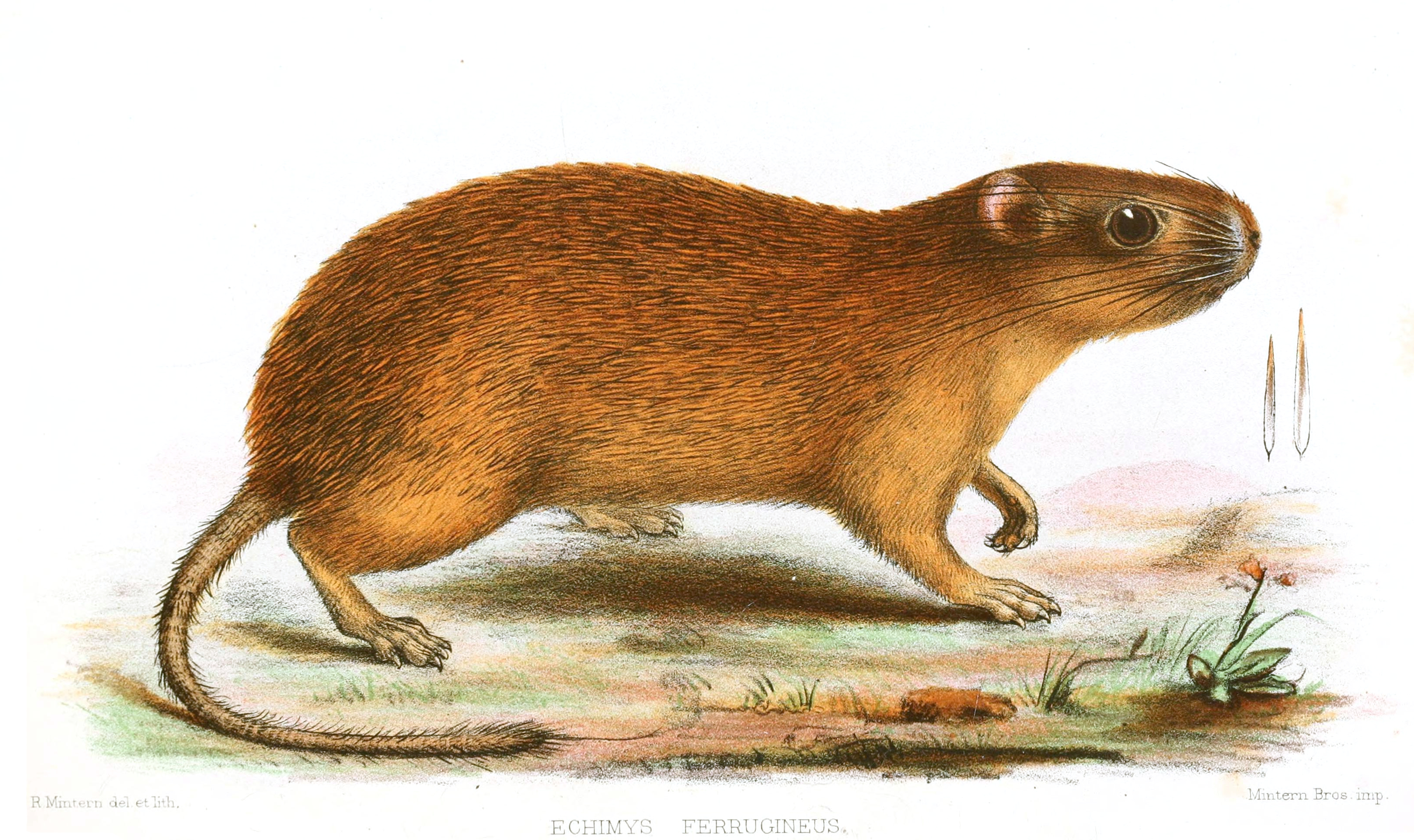

Mesomys is a genus of South American spiny rats in the family Echimyidae.

The genus name Mesomys derives from the two ancient greek words μέσος (mésos), meaning "middle of, between", and μῦς (mûs), meaning "mouse, rat". It refers to the fact that these rodents — literally the "middle mouse" — were considered an intermediate form between the genus Loncheres and the genus Echinomys, both of which are now known to be synonyms of Echimys.

== Extant species ==
Image	Scientific name	Common name	Distribution
	Mesomys hispidus	Ferreira's spiny tree-rat	Bolivia, Brazil, Colombia, Ecuador, French Guiana, Guyana, Peru, Suriname and Venezuela
	Mesomys leniceps	Woolly-headed spiny tree-rat	Peru
	Mesomys occultus	Tufted-tailed spiny tree-rat	Brazil
	Mesomys stimulax	Pará spiny tree-rat	Brazil.

== Phylogeny ==
Mesomys is a member of the Echimyini clade of arboreal Echimyidae rodents. The closest relative of Mesomys is Lonchothrix, reflecting the fact that these taxa have once been classified in the Eumysopinae, a subfamily now recognized as an artificial assemblage. These two genera share phylogenetic affinities with several taxa and clades: (i) Echimys, Phyllomys, Makalata, Pattonomys, and Toromys; (ii) the bamboo rats Dactylomys, Olallamys, Kannabateomys together with Diplomys and Santamartamys; and (iii) Isothrix.

Genus-level cladogram of the Echimyini.

- Echimyini
  - Isothrix
  - - "Eumysopines"
      - Lonchothrix
        (Tuft-tailed spiny tree-rat)
      - Mesomys
    - - - - Pattonomys
          - Toromys
            (Giant tree-rat)
        - - Makalata
          - - Echimys
            - Phyllomys
      - - - Diplomys
          - Santamartamys
            (Red-crested tree-rat)
        - "Dactylomyines"
          - Kannabateomys
            (Atlantic bamboo rat)
          - - Dactylomys
            - Olallamys

The cladogram has been reconstructed from mitochondrial and nuclear DNA characters.
