= Neacomys tenuipes =

Conservation status
- Least Concern (IUCN 3.1)

Scientific classification
- Kingdom: Animalia
- Phylum: Chordata
- Class: Mammalia
- Order: Rodentia
- Family: Cricetidae
- Subfamily: Sigmodontinae
- Genus: Neacomys
- Species: N. tenuipes

Binomial name
- Neacomys tenuipes Thomas, 1900

Species of rodent

Neacomys tenuipes, also known as the narrow-footed neacomys or narrow-footed bristly mouse, is found along the northern Andes from northwestern Venezuela through Colombia into Ecuador, in rainforest at elevations from 400 to 1,750 m (1,310 to 5,740 ft). Populations of small Neacomys in the lowland Amazon basin, previously assigned to this species, are now recognized as belonging to separate species.
