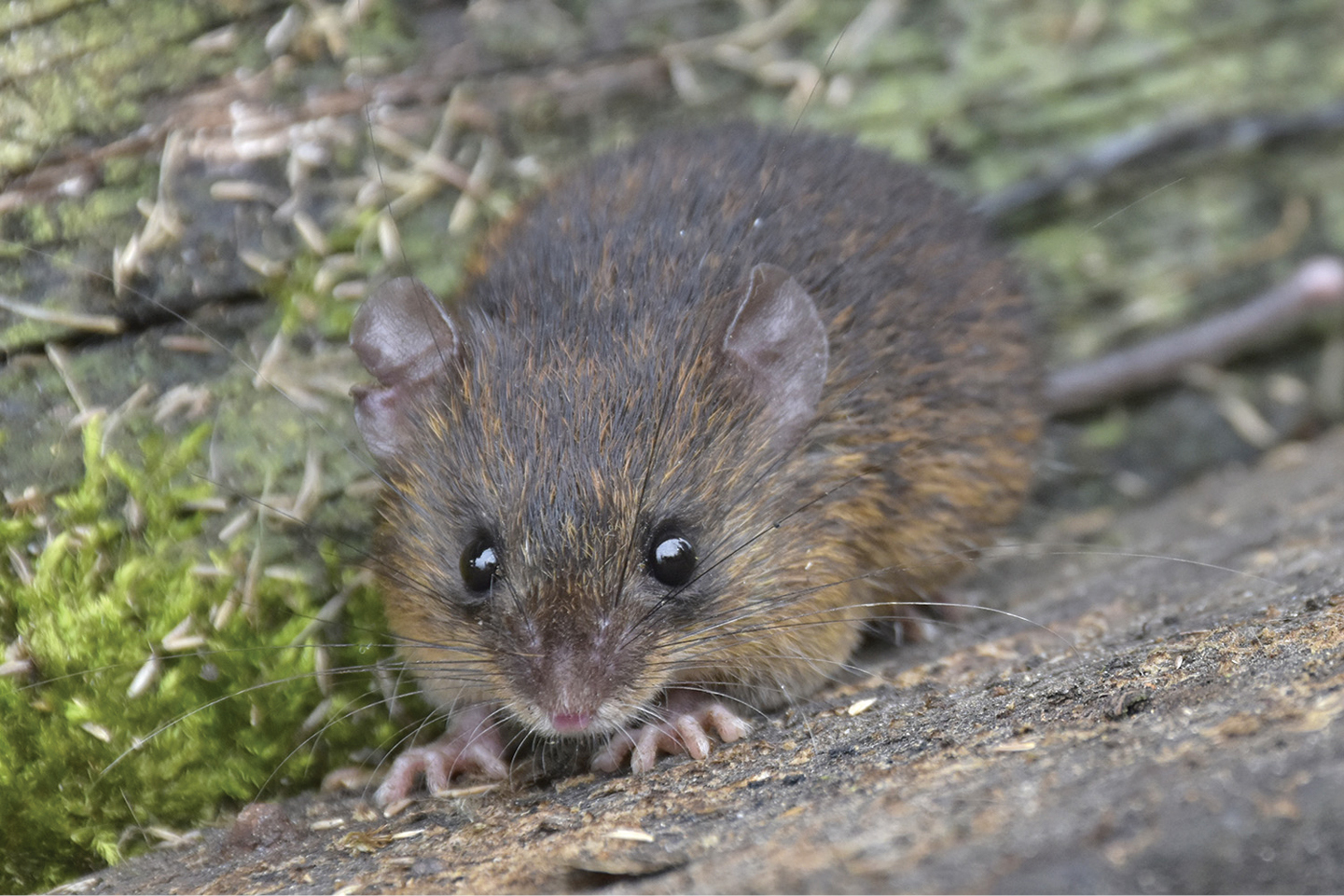
- Neacomys marci

Scientific classification
- Kingdom: Animalia
- Phylum: Chordata
- Class: Mammalia
- Infraclass: Placentalia
- Order: Rodentia
- Family: Cricetidae
- Subfamily: Sigmodontinae
- Tribe: Oryzomyini
- Genus: Neacomys; Thomas, 1900

Type species
- Hesperomys spinosus Thomas, 1882

Species
- See text.

= Neacomys =

Genus of rodents

The genus Neacomys, also known as bristly mice because of their spiny fur, includes several species of rodents in the tribe Oryzomyini of family Cricetidae. It is most closely related to Oligoryzomys, Oreoryzomys, and Microryzomys. Neacomys species are mainly found in the Amazon basin, but N. pictus occurs in Panama and N. tenuipes in montane Colombia.

== Species ==
There are currently about 24 described species in the genus.

- Neacomys aletheia — upper Juruá bristly mouse
- Neacomys amoenus — pleasant bristly mouse
- Neacomys dubosti — Dubost's bristly mouse
- Neacomys guianae — Guiana bristly mouse
- Neacomys elieceri — Eliecer's bristly mouse
- Neacomys jau — Jaú bristly mouse
- Neacomys macedoruizi — Macedo Ruiz's bristly mouse
- Neacomys marajoara — Marajó bristly mouse
- Neacomys marci - Marc's bristly mouse
- Neacomys minutus — small bristly mouse
- Neacomys musseri — Musser's bristly mouse
- Neacomys paracou — Paracou bristly mouse
- Neacomys pictus — painted bristly mouse
- Neacomys rosalindae — Rosalind's bristly mouse
- Neacomys serranensis
- Neacomys spinosus — large bristly mouse
- Neacomys tenuipes — narrow-footed bristly mouse
- Neacomys vargasllosai — Vargas Llosa's bristly mouse
- Neacomys vossi — Voss's bristly mouse
- Neacomys xingu — Xingu bristly mouse

== Literature cited ==
- Musser, G.G. and Carleton, M.D. 2005. Superfamily Muroidea. Pp. 894–1531 in Wilson, D.E. and Reeder, D.M. (eds.). Mammal Species of the World: a taxonomic and geographic reference. 3rd ed. Baltimore: The Johns Hopkins University Press, 2 vols., 2142 pp. ISBN 978-0-8018-8221-0
- Weksler, M. 2006. Phylogenetic relationships of oryzomyine rodents (Muroidea: Sigmodontinae): separate and combined analyses of morphological and molecular data. Bulletin of the American Museum of Natural History 296:1–149.
