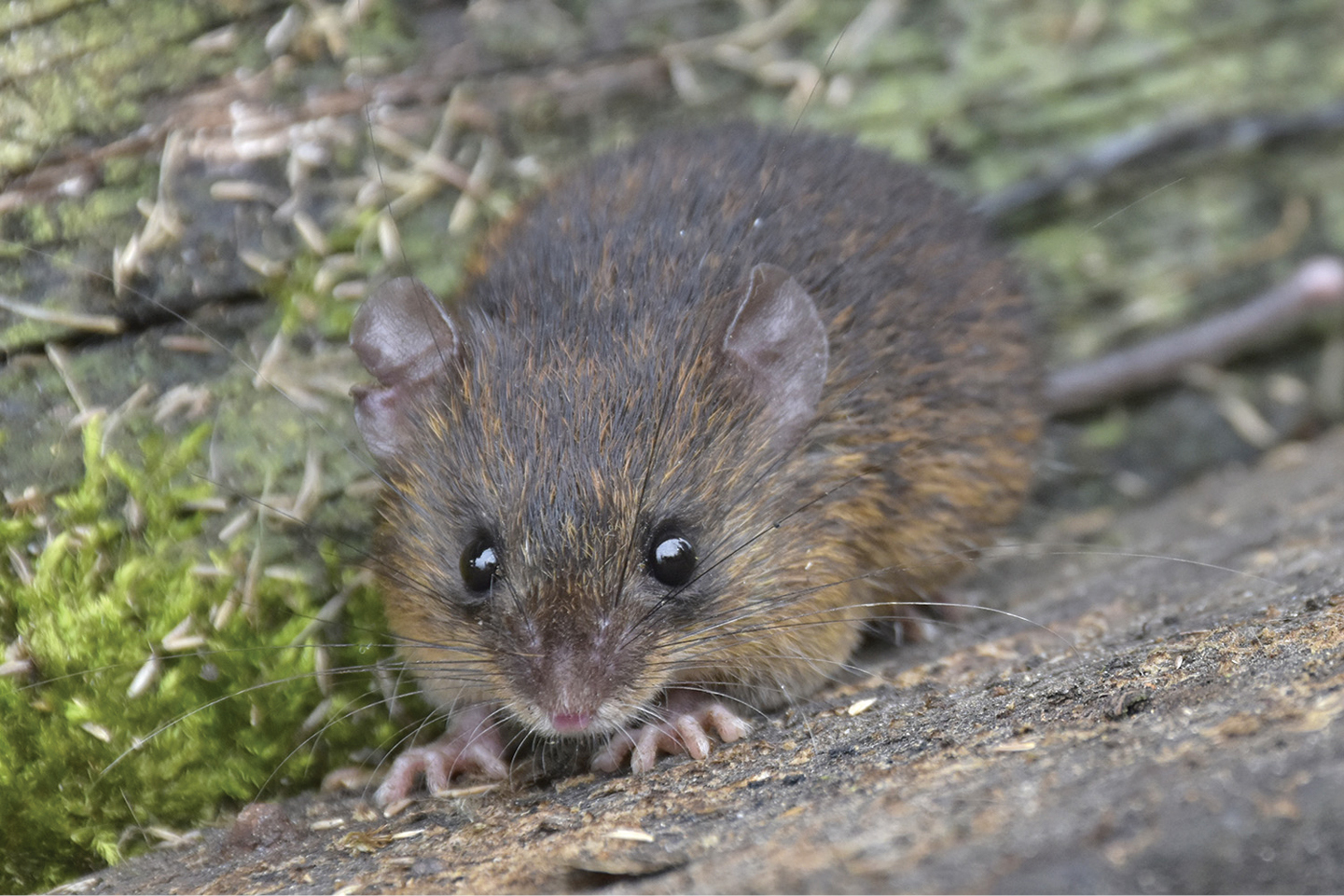

Scientific classification
- Kingdom: Animalia
- Phylum: Chordata
- Class: Mammalia
- Order: Rodentia
- Family: Cricetidae
- Subfamily: Sigmodontinae
- Genus: Neacomys
- Species: N. marci

Binomial name
- Neacomys marci Brito & Tinoco, 2023

= Neacomys marci =

Species of rodent

Neacomys marci, also known as Marc's bristly mouse, is a species of rodent in the genus Neacomys of family Cricetidae. It was formally described in 2023 and is named after Marc Hoogeslag, a supporter of the Manduriacu Reserve where the mouse was found. It is a small spiny mouse, with a head and body length of 65–85 mm. The dorsal fur is dark brown, with soft hairs mixed with spines. The fur on the throat is white and extends up to the corners of the mouth. The ventral fur is pale buff with a gray base. The dark tail is uniformly dark and slender. It is known from six localities in the provinces of Carchi, Pichincha, and Esmeraldas in northwestern Ecuador.

== Taxonomy ==
Neacomys marci was formally described in 2023 based on an adult female specimen collected from the Dracula Reserve in Carchi Province, Ecuador. The species is named after Marc Hoogeslag, co-founder of the Land Acquisition Fund of the IUCN - Netherlands, which has helped Manduriacu Reserve, where the mouse was found. The species has the English common name Marc’s white-throated spiny mouse and the Spanish common name Ratón espinoso de Marc.

== Description ==
Marc's bristly mouse is a small spiny mouse, with a head and body length of 65–85 mm. The dorsal fur is dark brown, with soft hairs mixed with spines. On average the dorsal hairs are 9–10 mm in length. The soft hair is tricolor, with a light brown band at the base, an orange band in the middle and a black apical band. The posterior mystacial vibrissae are thick and long (34 mm), surpassing the auricular pinnae when ad pressed back; two superciliary vibrissae, the longest measuring 39 mm, extending to the middle of the dorsum. One medium-sized genal vibrissae (32 mm) are also present, which are more slender than the mystacial vibrissae. The ears are large (12–16 mm) and oval in outline. Although the ears seem to be naked, they are covered with short black fringe of hair. The base of the internal ears is yellowish cream and the edges are dark, the hairs are yellowish and medium in size. A small pale orange postauricular patch is present.

The fur on the throat is white and extends up to the corners of the mouth. The ventral fur is pale buff with a gray base, and the hairs are on average 3.0–3.5 mm in length at the middle of the belly. The tail is uniformly dark, slender, and long (69–126% longer than head and body length). It is covered with rectangular scales (13 or 14 rows/cm near the base), with three dark brown hispid hairs emerging from the base of each scale, not longer than 1.5–2 scale rows. The hairs of the terminal portion of the tail form a small tuft (< 3 mm). Females have eight mammae arranged in pectoral, thoracic, abdominal, and inguinal pairs.

Marc's bristly mouse can be distinguished from other Neacomys species by its small size (head-body length 65–85 mm), long tail (69–126% longer than head and body length), pale buff colored belly fur, but with gray based hairs, white throat, long nasals (which extend well beyond the plane of the lacrimal), condylar process higher than coronoid process, M1 anterocone divided, M1 with broad protoflexus; m1–m3 with wide hypoflexids.

== Distribution and habitat ==
Marc's bristly mouse is known from six localities in the provinces of Carchi, Pichincha, and Esmeraldas in northwestern Ecuador. It inhabits the Chocó Biogeographical region, where it occupies the lower subtropical and lower montane ecosystems, in an altitudinal range from 450 to 1,630 m. These forests are characterized by having a tree cover of approximately 30 m height. Most of the vegetation is Araceae, Melastomataceae, Cyclanthaceae, Bromeliaceae, and ferns.

== See also ==
- List of living mammal species described in the 2020s
