= Pará spiny tree-rat =

Pará spiny tree rat

Conservation status
- Least Concern (IUCN 3.1)

Scientific classification
- Kingdom: Animalia
- Phylum: Chordata
- Class: Mammalia
- Order: Rodentia
- Family: Echimyidae
- Subfamily: Echimyinae
- Tribe: Echimyini
- Genus: Mesomys
- Species: M. stimulax

Binomial name
- Mesomys stimulax Thomas, 1911
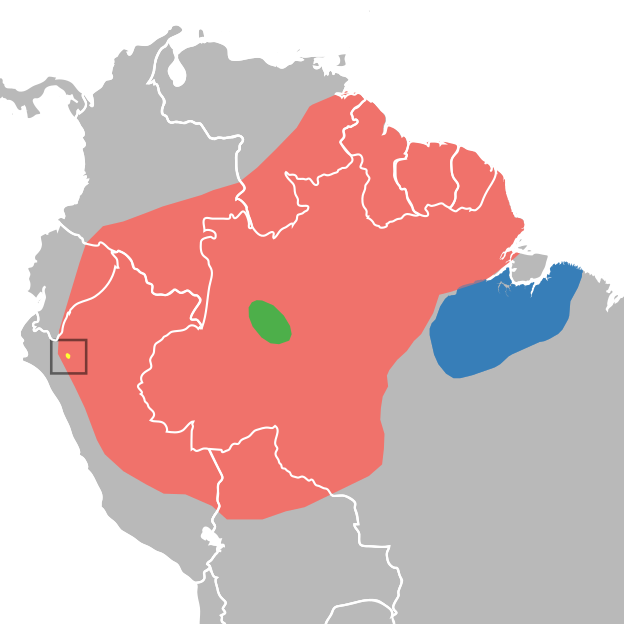
- Mesomys distribution M. stimulax in blue

Species of rodent

The Pará spiny tree rat (Mesomys stimulax) or Surinam spiny tree rat, is a spiny rat species found in Brazil. Previously, Mesomys Stimulax's karyotype was 2n=60, Fundamental number (abbreviated FN), FN=116. However more recently the new karyotype has been found to be 2n=60, FN=110. This points to the idea that this species is most likely a species complex.
