= Neacomys paracou =

Conservation status
- Least Concern (IUCN 3.1)

Scientific classification
- Kingdom: Animalia
- Phylum: Chordata
- Class: Mammalia
- Order: Rodentia
- Family: Cricetidae
- Subfamily: Sigmodontinae
- Genus: Neacomys
- Species: N. paracou

Binomial name
- Neacomys paracou Voss et al., 2001

Species of rodent

Neacomys paracou, also known as the Paracou neacomys or Paracou bristly mouse, is a rodent species from South America in the genus Neacomys. It is found in northern Brazil, French Guiana, Guyana, Suriname and southeastern Venezuela.
