= Neacomys pictus =

Conservation status
- Data Deficient (IUCN 3.1)

Scientific classification
- Kingdom: Animalia
- Phylum: Chordata
- Class: Mammalia
- Order: Rodentia
- Family: Cricetidae
- Subfamily: Sigmodontinae
- Genus: Neacomys
- Species: N. pictus

Binomial name
- Neacomys pictus Goldman, 1912

Species of rodent

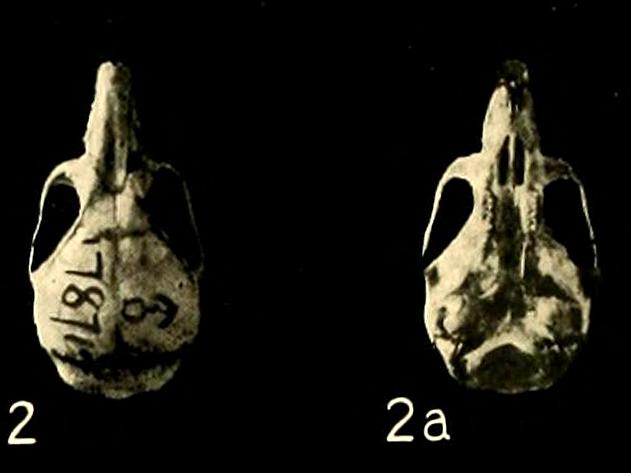
Neacomys pictus skull

Neacomys pictus, also known as the painted neacomys or painted bristly mouse, is a species of rodent in the genus Neacomys of family Cricetidae. It is found only in Panama.
