= Neacomys minutus =

Conservation status
- Least Concern (IUCN 3.1)

Scientific classification
- Kingdom: Animalia
- Phylum: Chordata
- Class: Mammalia
- Order: Rodentia
- Family: Cricetidae
- Subfamily: Sigmodontinae
- Genus: Neacomys
- Species: N. minutus

Binomial name
- Neacomys minutus Patton et al., 2000

Species of rodent

Neacomys minutus, also known as the minute neacomys, the small bristly mouse, or the minute spiny mouse, is a rodent species from South America in the genus Neacomys. It is found in Brazil.

== Description ==
A small mouse, Neacomys minutus has a head-and-body length of 65 to 79 mm (2.6 to 3.1 in) and a tail of 68 to 90 mm (2.7 to 3.5 in). The upper parts are clad in rather coarse fur which is dark orangish-brown and finely grizzled with black; the underparts are pale and there are short, grooved spines mixed in with the fur. The tail is sparsely haired and is bicoloured, being dark above and pale beneath. The ears are small and rounded, and the hind feet are slender and have naked soles, the central three of the five claws being considerably longer than the outer ones.

== Distribution and habitat ==
N. minutus is found in the Amazon basin in western Brazil and eastern Peru. Its range includes the middle and lower basin of the Juruá River in Amazonas State, and the adjoining part of Loreto Region in Peru. Its habitat is the seasonally flooded moist broadleaf várzea forest and the drier, upland, terra firme forest.

== Ecology ==
Breeding takes place in both the dry and the wet season, and seems to start at a young age, as some reproductively active individuals still have unworn teeth and have not fully shed their juvenile fur. The average litter size is three; one female was found to be both pregnant and lactating. It shares its range with Neacomys spinosus but is replaced in the upper parts of the Juruá basin by Neacomys musseri.

== Status ==
This mouse has a very wide range and is assumed to have a stable population. It is probably able to tolerate some degree of habitat modification and it occurs in at least two protected areas, so the International Union for Conservation of Nature has assessed its conservation status as being of "least concern".
