= Woolly-headed spiny tree-rat =

Conservation status
- Data Deficient (IUCN 3.1)

Scientific classification
- Kingdom: Animalia
- Phylum: Chordata
- Class: Mammalia
- Infraclass: Placentalia
- Order: Rodentia
- Family: Echimyidae
- Subfamily: Echimyinae
- Tribe: Echimyini
- Genus: Mesomys
- Species: M. leniceps

Binomial name
- Mesomys leniceps Thomas & St. Leger, 1926
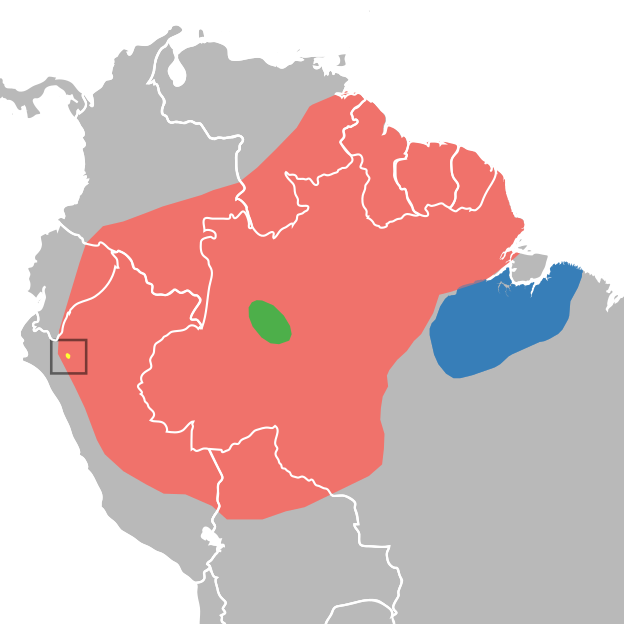
- Mesomys distribution M. leniceps in yellow (in box)

Species of rodent

The woolly-headed spiny tree-rat (Mesomys leniceps) is a species of rodent in the family Echimyidae. It is endemic to Peru.

The etymology of the species name corresponds to the Latin word leniceps constructed from lēnis meaning calm, gentle, and the suffix -ceps meaning headed.
