= Tufted-tailed spiny tree-rat =

Conservation status
- Least Concern (IUCN 3.1)

Scientific classification
- Kingdom: Animalia
- Phylum: Chordata
- Class: Mammalia
- Infraclass: Placentalia
- Order: Rodentia
- Family: Echimyidae
- Subfamily: Echimyinae
- Tribe: Echimyini
- Genus: Mesomys
- Species: M. occultus

Binomial name
- Mesomys occultus Patton, da Silva & Malcolm, 2000
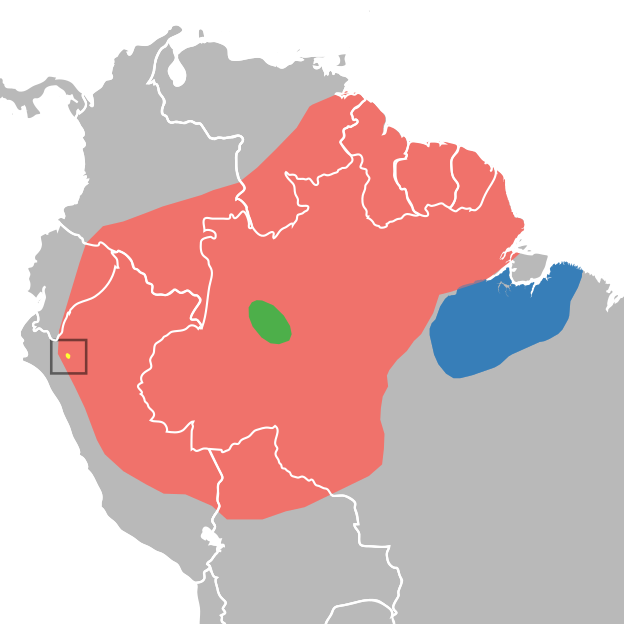
- Mesomys distribution M. occultus in green

Species of rodent

The tufted-tailed spiny tree-rat or furtive spiny tree-rat (Mesomys occultus) is a spiny rat species known from Amazonas, northwestern Brazil, where it is found in tropical rainforest. The species is arboreal.
