= Ambang =

Complex of volcanoes in the northern arm of Sulawesi island

Highest point
- Elevation: 1,795 m (5,889 ft)
- Listing: Ribu
- Coordinates: 0.75°N 124.42°E

Geography
- Location: Sulawesi, Indonesia

Geology
- Mountain type: Complex volcano
- Last eruption: 1850 +/- 5 years

Ambang is a complex of volcanoes at the western end of the northern arm of Sulawesi island, Indonesia. There are two lakes, lake Mo'oat and lake Tondok (Danau Mo'oat and danau Tondok), at an elevation of 750 m. The larger of the two lakes is Mo'oat. Both of them are side by side. The volcano contains several craters up to 400 m in diameter and five solfatara fields. The only historical account of its eruption occurred sometime in the 1850s.

== See also ==
- List of volcanoes in Indonesia
