= Neacomys guianae =

Conservation status
- Least Concern (IUCN 3.1)

Scientific classification
- Kingdom: Animalia
- Phylum: Chordata
- Class: Mammalia
- Order: Rodentia
- Family: Cricetidae
- Subfamily: Sigmodontinae
- Genus: Neacomys
- Species: N. guianae

Binomial name
- Neacomys guianae Thomas, 1905

Species of rodent

Neacomys guianae, also known as the Guianan neacomys or Guiana bristly mouse, is a nocturnal rodent species from South America. It is found in lowland tropical rainforests in northeastern Brazil, French Guiana, Guyana, Suriname and Venezuela. Its diet consists of insects, seeds and fruit.

== Literature cited ==
- Musser, G. G.; Carleton, M. D. (2005). "Superfamily Muroidea". In Wilson, D. E.; Reeder, D. M. (eds.). Mammal Species of the World: A Taxonomic and Geographic Reference (3rd ed.). Johns Hopkins University Press. pp. 894–1531. ISBN 978-0-8018-8221-0. OCLC 62265494.
