= Latimojong, Enrekang =

Latimojong
- Location in South Sulawesi and Indonesia Latimojong (Indonesia)
- Coordinates: 3°27′2.4228″S 120°0′32.4864″E
- Country: Indonesia
- Province: South Sulawesi
- Regency: Enrekang Regency
- District: Buntu Batu District
- Elevation: 7,986 ft (2,434 m)

Population (2010)
  - Total: 2,054
- Time zone: UTC+8 (Indonesia Central Standard Time)

Latimojong is a village in Buntu Batu district, Enrekang Regency in South Sulawesi province. Its population is 2054.

== Climate ==
Latimojong has a cold subtropical highland climate (Cfb) with moderate rainfall in September and October and heavy to very heavy rainfall in the remaining months.

Climate data for Latimojong
Month	Jan	Feb	Mar	Apr	May	Jun	Jul	Aug	Sep	Oct	Nov	Dec	Year
Mean daily maximum °C (°F)	18.1 (64.6)	18.3 (64.9)	18.4 (65.1)	18.0 (64.4)	17.3 (63.1)	16.4 (61.5)	15.8 (60.4)	16.6 (61.9)	17.8 (64.0)	19.2 (66.6)	18.7 (65.7)	18.2 (64.8)	17.7 (63.9)
Daily mean °C (°F)	13.8 (56.8)	13.9 (57.0)	14.1 (57.4)	13.9 (57.0)	13.7 (56.7)	13.1 (55.6)	12.4 (54.3)	12.7 (54.9)	13.3 (55.9)	14.2 (57.6)	14.1 (57.4)	13.9 (57.0)	13.6 (56.5)
Mean daily minimum °C (°F)	9.6 (49.3)	9.6 (49.3)	9.8 (49.6)	9.8 (49.6)	10.2 (50.4)	9.8 (49.6)	9.0 (48.2)	8.8 (47.8)	8.8 (47.8)	9.3 (48.7)	9.6 (49.3)	9.7 (49.5)	9.5 (49.1)
Average precipitation mm (inches)	509 (20.0)	462 (18.2)	330 (13.0)	319 (12.6)	226 (8.9)	165 (6.5)	101 (4.0)	116 (4.6)	67 (2.6)	98 (3.9)	209 (8.2)	397 (15.6)	2,999 (118.1)
Source: Climate-Data.org
