= Tian Shan montane conifer forests =

Ecoregion in the Tian Shan Mountains

Ecoregion: Tian Shan montane conifer forests
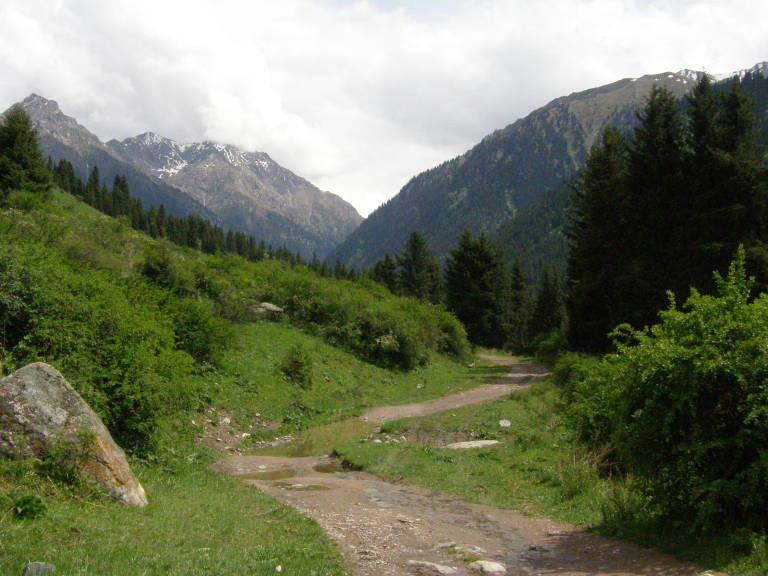
- Karakol Canyon, southeast of Lake Issyk-Kul

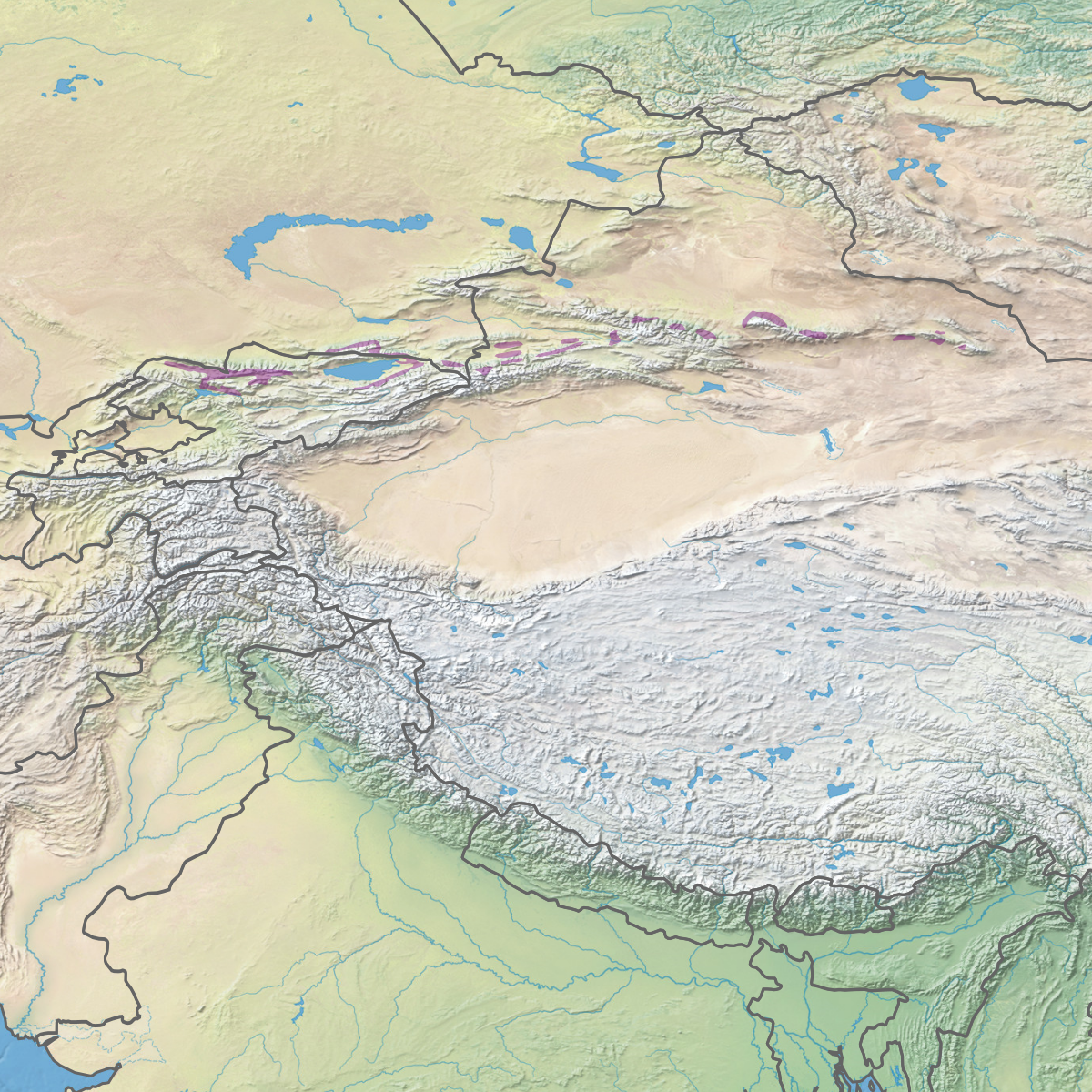
- Ecoregion territory (in purple)

Ecology
- Realm: Palearctic
- Biome: Temperate coniferous forest

Geography
- Area: 24,605 km^{2} (9,500 mi^{2})
- Countries: China; Kazakhstan; Kyrgyzstan
- Coordinates: 43°30′N 84°30′E

The Tian Shan montane conifer forests ecoregion (WWF ID: PA0521) covers the "forest belt" of the Tian Shan mountains - generally the north-facing slopes that get enough moisture, and are warm enough, for trees to grow. This conifer belt is found mostly between 1,500 and 2,700 meters.

== Location and description ==
The ecoregion stretches in patches on the main Tian Shan mountain ridge, across approximately 2,000 km from western Kyrgyzstan to eastern Xinjiang Province in China. The conifer forest belt is found on north-facing slopes, at altitudes from a minimum of 1,500 meters (below which it is too dry to support conifers) to a maximum of 2,700-3,200 meters (above which it is too cold). The disconnected components of the ecoregion tend to be elongated along ridges that average 4,000 meters in height, with one of the larger sections wrapping around Lake Issyk-Kul. In general, the landscape below the forest belt is steppe, and above is alpine meadow with occasional dwarf junipers.

== Climate ==
The climate of the ecoregion is cold semi-arid (Köppen climate classification (BSk)). This climate is generally characterized as having precipitation greater than a true desert, and also a colder temperature.

== Flora and fauna ==
The dominant conifer in these forests is the Asian spruce (Picea schrenkiana), which usually grows in stands of the same species. Aspen is found mixed with the spruce at lower altitudes. Birch, willow, and mountain ash are found at higher altitudes. At lower altitudes within the forest belt, an understory of shrubs, grasses and forbes are found under the tree canopy.
