= Changjiang Plain evergreen forests =

Ecoregion in Central China

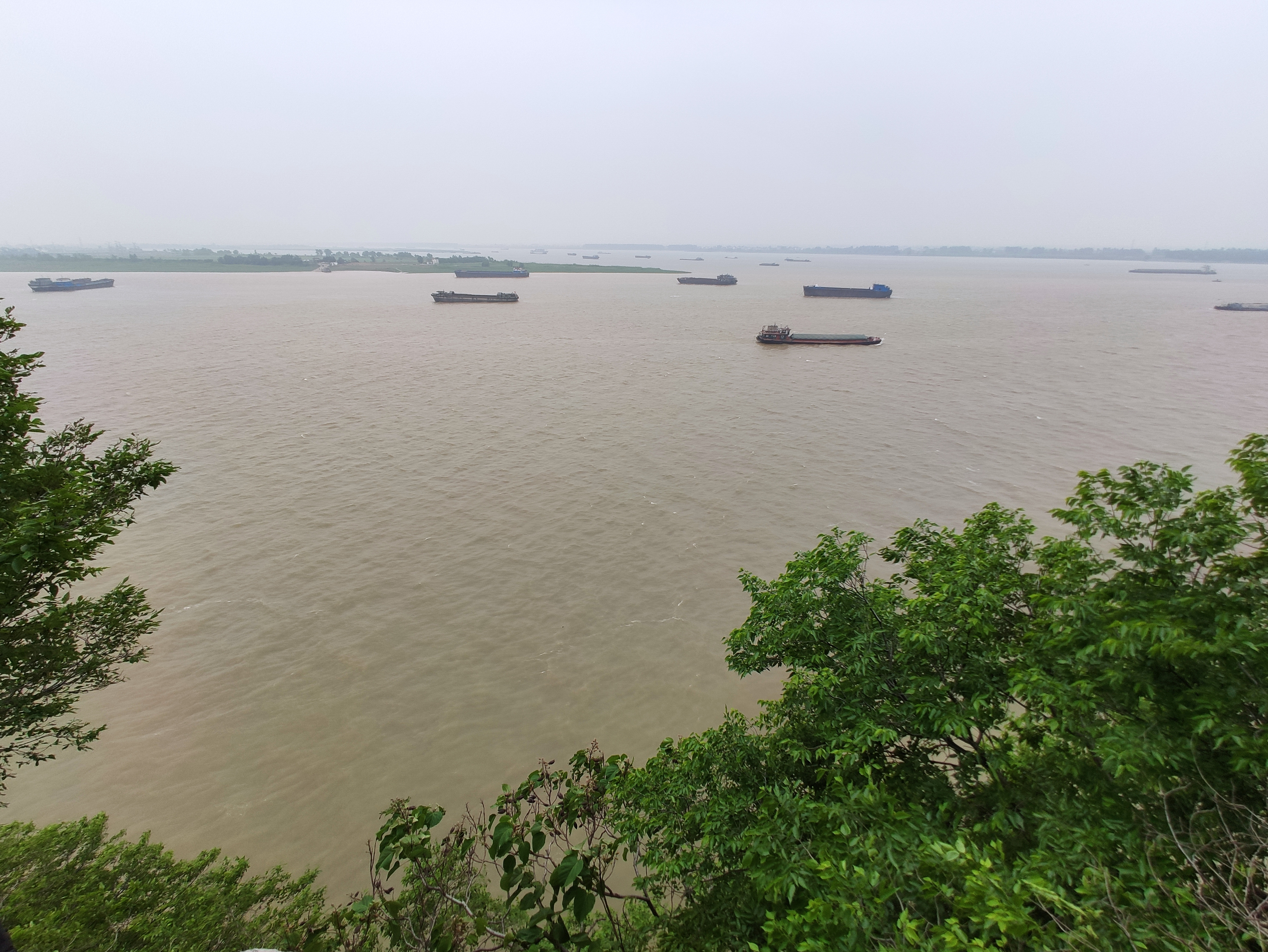
- River traffic on Yangtze River and Poyang Lake

- Ecoregion territory (in purple)

Ecology
- Realm: Palearctic
- Biome: Temperate broadleaf and mixed forest

Geography
- Area: 437,967 km^{2} (169,100 sq mi)
- Countries: China
- Coordinates: 30°30′N 117°45′E

The Changjiang Plain evergreen forests ecoregion (WWF ID: PA0415) covers the plain of the Yangtze River (Changjiang) from where it leaves the mountains at the Three Gorges in the west, to the mouth of the Yangtze at the East China Sea. This plain is one of the most densely populated areas on Earth, and most of the original oak and conifer forests have long been converted to agriculture. Extensive wetlands, however, provide habitat for migratory waterfowl and for diverse aquatic species.

== Location and description ==
The Yangtze River Plain stretches 1,000 km from the Three Gorges to the sea. The terrain is mostly flat or low alluvial hills, with numerous shallow lakes. Large lakes include Poyang Lake, the largest freshwater lake in China, and Dongting Lake which was formerly the largest but has seen significant conversion to farmland over the years. The floodplain lakes grow and shrink dramatically with the seasons - Dongting Lake grows from 3,700 km^{2} to 13,000 km^{2} in the summer (and its depth increases by 10 meters).

== Climate ==
The climate of the ecoregion is Humid subtropical climate, warm wet summer (Köppen climate classification (Cfa)). This climate is characterized by large seasonal temperature differentials. No month averages below 0 °C (32 °F), at least one month averages above 22 °C (72 °F), and four months average over 10 °C (50 °F). Precipitation is relatively even throughout the year.

== Flora and fauna ==
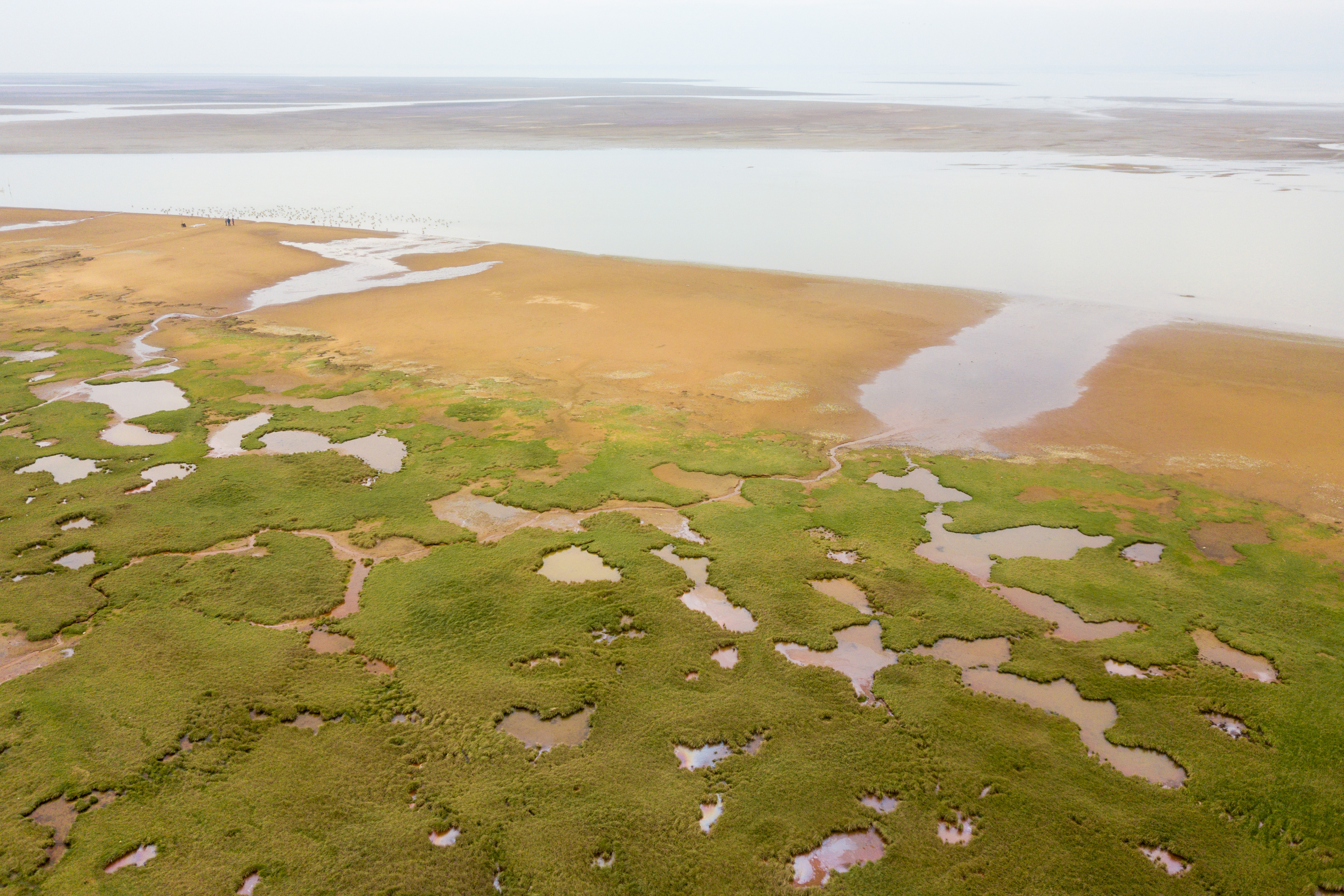
Wetlands in Poyang Lake National Wetland Park

The plain was once home to extensive evergreen oak (Cyclobalanopsis) or chinquapin (Castanopsis) forests, but the flat areas have mostly been converted to rice paddies. Better drained hills once supported conifers, but these areas are now mostly scrub or developed. Seasonal flooding of the river and surrounding wetlands provide habitat for waterfowl and aquatic life.

Aquatic life includes endangered species, such as the Chinese sturgeon (Acipenser sinensis) and the Chinese alligator (Alligator sinensis).

== See also ==
- List of ecoregions in China
