= Zinapécuaro de Figueroa =

- Town
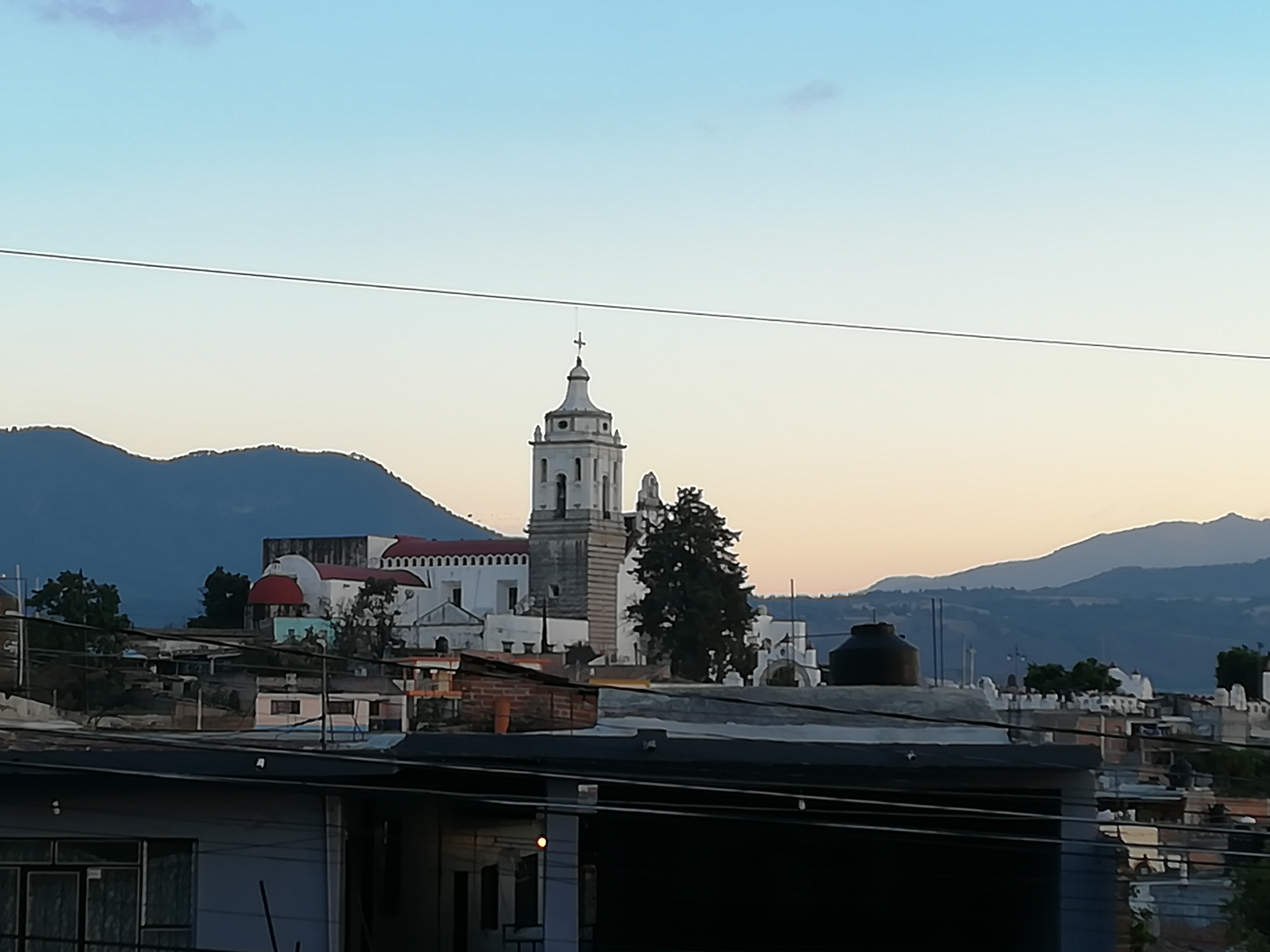

- Location in Mexico
- Coordinates: 19°51′37″N 100°49′39″W
- Country: Mexico
- State: Michoacán
- Municipality: Zinapécuaro

Area
  - Total: 7.33 km^{2} (2.83 sq mi)

Population (2020)
  - Total: 16,905

Zinapécuaro de Figueroa is a town and the seat of the municipality of Zinapécuaro, in the central Mexican state of Michoacán.

== Topynymy ==
Zinapécuaro is a Purépecha word meaning "place of obsidian" or "place of healing".

== History ==
Before the conquest, Zinapécuaro was subjugated by the Tarascan lordship of Hirepan, Hiquíngare and finally Tanganxoán. They built a temple to worship the goddess Cuerauáperi, the creative mother.

After the arrival of the Spaniards, the region was dominated by the conqueror Luis Montañez, who founded the town of Zinapécuaro around 1530. A republic of Native Mexicans settled there. The evangelization was carried out by Franciscan friars.

During the development of the struggle for independence, in October 1810, the insurgent forces led by Miguel Hidalgo y Costilla were in the town of Zinapécuaro. After the independence of Mexico, in 1831, the municipality of Zinapécuaro was established. Later, the municipal seat was called Villa de Figueroa, in memory of the town's priest, Juan Bautista Figueroa.

== Demographics ==
According to 2020 census, Zinapécuaro de Figueroa had 16,905 inhabitants, which represents an average growth of 0.64% per year in the 2010-2020 period based on the 15,875 inhabitants registered in the previous census. As of 2020, there were 8,133 men and 8,772 women living in Zinapécuaro de Figueroa. The population density was 2,306 inhabitants/km^{2}.
