= Neacomys jau =

Scientific classification
- Kingdom: Animalia
- Phylum: Chordata
- Class: Mammalia
- Order: Rodentia
- Family: Cricetidae
- Subfamily: Sigmodontinae
- Genus: Neacomys
- Species: N. jau

Binomial name
- Neacomys jau Semedo, M. N. F. Silva, Carmignotto, & R. V. Rossi, 2021

Species of rodent

Neacomys jau, also known as the Jaú bristly mouse, is a species of rodent in the genus Neacomys.

== See also ==
- List of living mammal species described in the 2020s
