= Neacomys musseri =

Conservation status
- Least Concern (IUCN 3.1)

Scientific classification
- Kingdom: Animalia
- Phylum: Chordata
- Class: Mammalia
- Order: Rodentia
- Family: Cricetidae
- Subfamily: Sigmodontinae
- Genus: Neacomys
- Species: N. musseri

Binomial name
- Neacomys musseri Patton et al., 2000

Species of rodent

Neacomys musseri, also known as Musser's neacomys or Musser's bristly mouse, is a rodent species from South America. It is found in far western Brazil and southeastern Peru.
