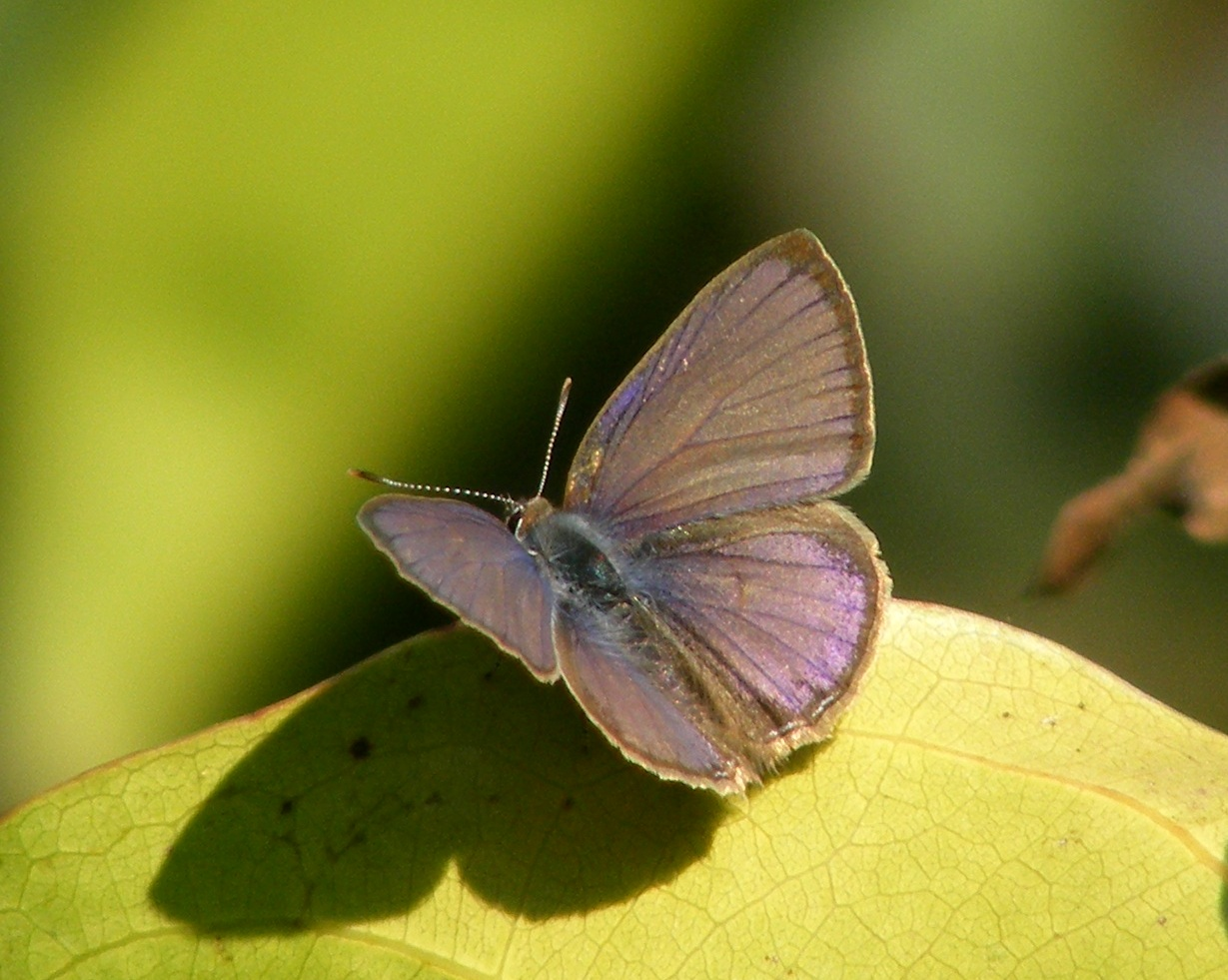
- Upperside
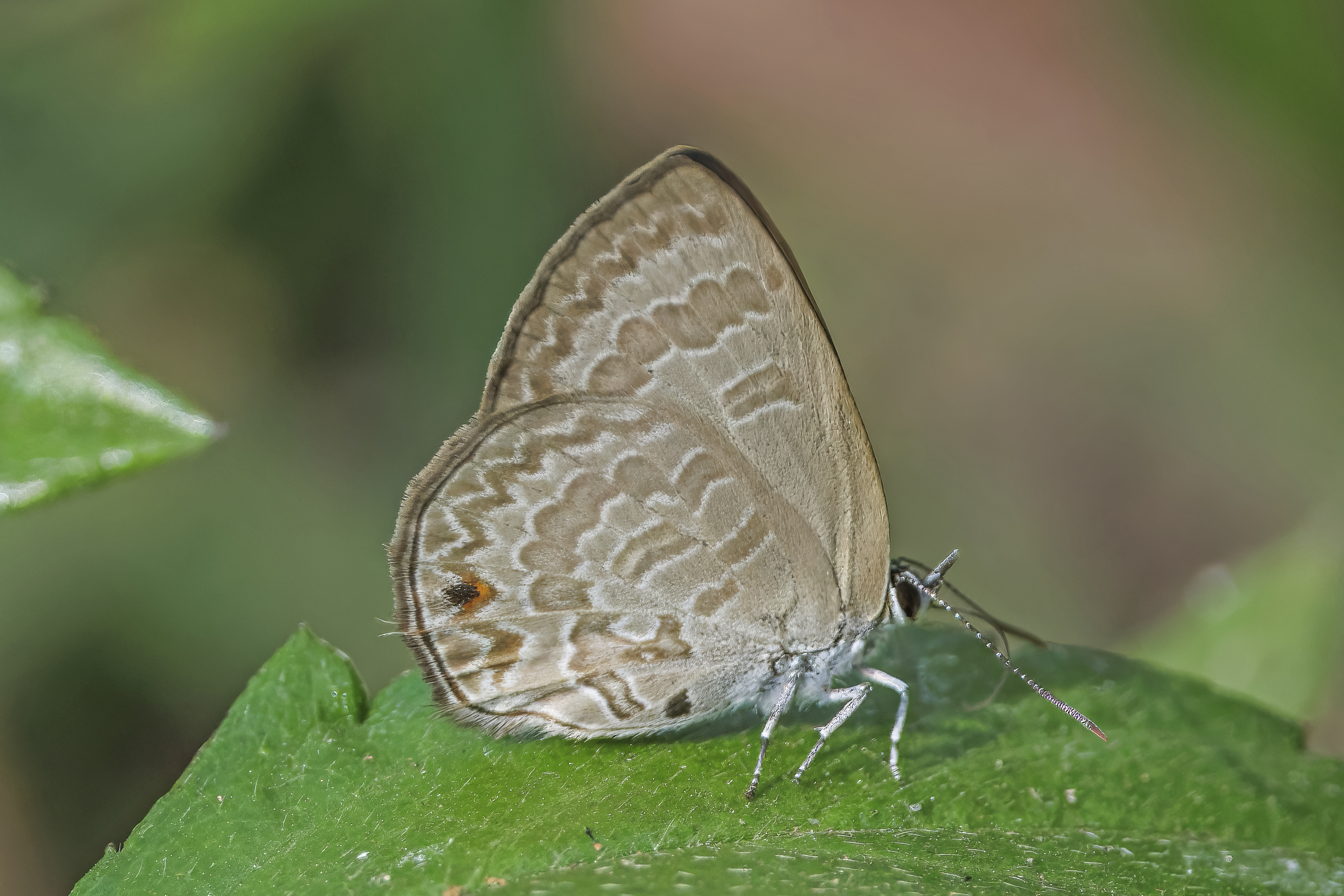
- Ventral view

Scientific classification
- Kingdom: Animalia
- Phylum: Arthropoda
- Class: Insecta
- Order: Lepidoptera
- Family: Lycaenidae
- Genus: Anthene
- Species: A. emolus

Binomial name
- Anthene emolus (Godart 1823)

Synonyms
- Polyommatus emolus Godart, [1824]; Lycaenesthes emolus; Lampides balliston Hübner, [1823]; Lycaenesthes bengalensis Moore, [1866]; Pseudodipsas modesta Staudinger, 1889; Lycaenesthes emolus andamanicus Fruhstorfer, 1916; Lycaenesthes emolus goberus Fruhstorfer, 1916; Nacaduba klanga Corbet, 1938; Lycaenesthes emolus javanus Fruhstorfer, 1916; Lycaenesthes emolus minor van Eecke, 1918

= Anthene emolus =

Ciliate blue

Species of butterfly

Anthene emolus, the ciliate blue, is a small butterfly found in India and southeast Asia that belongs to the lycaenids or blues family. The species was first described by Jean-Baptiste Godart in 1823.

== Description ==
=== Male ===
Upperside: dull purple; bases of the wings suffused with blue; both forewings and hindwings with well-marked jet-black anteciliary lines, that on the forewing expand slightly at the apex. Hindwing: the costal margin above vein 7 and the dorsal margin below vein 1a fuscous brown; irregular, transverse, sub-terminal black spots in interspaces 1 to 3, those in interspaces 1 and 2 much larger than that in interspace 3; posterior basal area covered with long purplish-brown hairs. Cilia of both forewings and hindwings brown.

Underside: purplish brown with a smooth satiny lustre. Forewing: a short band on the discocellulars, a transverse comparatively broad discal band with very sinuate margins, and a subterminal, continuous, lunular, much narrower band; the former two brown, of a shade darker than the ground colour, the subterminal band fuscous black; the band on the discocellulars and the discal band edged narrowly with white both on the inner and outer sides, the subterminal band very obscurely similarly edged on the outer side only. Hindwing: somewhat densely sprinkled with black scales at extreme base and crossed transversely by seven or eight very irregular lines of slender white lunules; the outer two lines outwardly concave, the others outwardly convex, each lunule of the inner line of the former two series touching the corresponding lunule of the line next to it on the inner side, so that in each interspace the two touching lines of lunules seem to form a series of markings like X; finally, a white-edged black spot in the middle of the dorsum and another subterminal black spot crowned inwardly with orange in interspace 3. Both forewings and hindwings with slender jet-black anteciliary lines and brown cilia, the anteciliary line on the hindwing edged inwardly and outwardly by a white thread.

Antennae black, the shafts speckled with white; head, thorax and abdomen purplish brown.

=== Female ===
Upperside: brown, the bases of the wings glossed with pale violet-blue on the forewing, in some specimens extended for two-thirds the length of the wing but always more or less of a broad margin of the ground colour is left along the costa, a still broader margin along the term en and a narrow edging along the dorsum; on the hindwing the blue gloss rarely extends further than the basal third. Both forewings and hindwings with slender anteciliary black lines, that on the hindwing posteriorly is inwardly margined with a thread of white, on the inner side of which again and touching it are three or four conical or triangular small black spots in the interspaces. Cilia of both wings pale brown.

Underside: ground colour slightly paler, markings similar.

Antennae blackish brown, the shafts speckled with white as in the male; head, thorax and abdomen brown; beneath: the palpi, thorax and abdomen paler brown.

== Larva ==
When full-fed 0.62 of an inch in length, somewhat dark green in colour (of a darker shade than most Lycaenid larvae), smooth and shining, the whole surface covered with minute pits to be seen only under a strong magnifying-glass. The head is very small and retractile as usual and of a pale green colour; the second segment is unmarked, the third to sixth segments inclusive have some obscure reddish-brown dorsal blotches, the three following segments are unmarked, the tenth to twelfth segments have somewhat similar blotches to those on the third to the sixth segments, but they are more distinct and darker in shade. There is a pale yellow lateral line just above the legs. All the segments are irregularly and broadly pitted at the sides; these pits seem to assume more or less the form of a longitudinal subdorsal depression, below which to the lateral line the colour of the insect is slightly paler. The whole larva is much depressed, somewhat wider than high and seems to gradually increase in breadth to the tenth segment, the last segment is almost as broad and rounded. The larva varies greatly in colour and markings, some being pale green throughout and unmarked, others again are reddish brown throughout. It feeds in Calcutta on Nephelium litchi, Cassia fistula, and Heynea trijuga, and not improbably, as it feeds on so many bushes, it will eat others. Dr. Forel identifies the ant which attends the larva as Oecophylla smaragdina, Fabr., the large red and green ant which makes immense nests of growing leaves in trees. (Lionel de Nicéville quoted by Bingham)

In India, larval hosts of A. emolus include Mangifera indica L. (Anacardiaceae), Combretum latifolium Blume and Terminalia paniculata Roth (Combretaceae), Cassia fistula L. and Saraca asoca (Roxb.) Willd. (Fabaceae), Heynea trijuga (Wight & Am.) Bentv. and hybrid mahogany (Swietenia macrophylla King × S. mahogany (L.) Jacq.) (Meliaceae), and Litchi chinensis Sonn. (Sapindaceae).

== Pupa ==
0.4 of an inch in length, of the usual Lyccenid shape, the tail pointed, the thorax slightly humped and ending in a somewhat sharp ridge line on the back; it is coloured pale ochraceous and bears a prominent diamond-shaped mark posteriorly, It is smooth throughout, reddish brown sprinkled with minute darker dots. (de Nicéville)

== Subspecies ==
Listed alphabetically:

- Anthene emolus andamanicus (Fruhstorfer, 1916) – (Andamans)
- Anthene emolus emolus – (north-western Himalayas to Myanmar, Thailand, Laos, Vietnam, Hainan, southern Yunnan)
- Anthene emolus goberus (Fruhstorfer, 1916) – (Thailand, Peninsular Malaya, Singapore, Sumatra, Borneo, Hainan)
- Anthene emolus javanus (Fruhstorfer, 1916) – (Java, Sumbawa)
- Anthene emolus minor (van Eecke, 1918) – (Pulao Babi)
- Anthene emolus modesta (Staudinger, 1889) – (Palawan)

== See also ==
- List of butterflies of India
- List of butterflies of India (Lycaenidae)
