= Munronia assamica =

Scientific classification
- Kingdom: Plantae
- Clade: Tracheophytes
- Clade: Angiosperms
- Clade: Eudicots
- Clade: Rosids
- Order: Sapindales
- Family: Meliaceae
- Genus: Munronia
- Species: M. assamica

Binomial name
- Munronia assamica S.Dey & Bhaumik

Species of flowering plant

Munronia assamica is a plant in the family Meliaceae. It was discovered in 2025 by S. Dey in the Kopili River basin.
