= Ruagea membranacea =

Conservation status
- Vulnerable (IUCN 3.1)

Scientific classification
- Kingdom: Plantae
- Clade: Tracheophytes
- Clade: Angiosperms
- Clade: Eudicots
- Clade: Rosids
- Order: Sapindales
- Family: Meliaceae
- Genus: Ruagea
- Species: R. membranacea

Binomial name
- Ruagea membranacea W.Palacios

Species of flowering plant

Ruagea membranacea is a species of plant in the family Meliaceae. It is endemic to Ecuador.
