= Turraea kimbozensis =

Conservation status
- Endangered (IUCN 3.1)

Scientific classification
- Kingdom: Plantae
- Clade: Tracheophytes
- Clade: Angiosperms
- Clade: Eudicots
- Clade: Rosids
- Order: Sapindales
- Family: Meliaceae
- Genus: Turraea
- Species: T. kimbozensis

Binomial name
- Turraea kimbozensis Cheek

Species of flowering plant

Turraea kimbozensis is a species of plant in the family Meliaceae. It is endemic to Tanzania. It is threatened by habitat loss.
