= Leplaea mayombensis =

Conservation status
- Vulnerable (IUCN 2.3)

Scientific classification
- Kingdom: Plantae
- Clade: Tracheophytes
- Clade: Angiosperms
- Clade: Eudicots
- Clade: Rosids
- Order: Sapindales
- Family: Meliaceae
- Genus: Leplaea
- Species: L. mayombensis

Binomial name
- Leplaea mayombensis (Pellegr.) Staner

Synonyms
- Guarea mayombensis Pellegr.; Leplaea coalescens Vermoesen

Species of flowering plant

Leplaea mayombensis is a species of plant in the family Meliaceae. It is found in the Democratic Republic of the Congo, Gabon, and Uganda. It is threatened by habitat loss.
