= Ruagea ovalis =

Conservation status
- Least Concern (IUCN 3.1)

Scientific classification
- Kingdom: Plantae
- Clade: Tracheophytes
- Clade: Angiosperms
- Clade: Eudicots
- Clade: Rosids
- Order: Sapindales
- Family: Meliaceae
- Genus: Ruagea
- Species: R. ovalis

Binomial name
- Ruagea ovalis (Rusby) Harms

Species of plant

Ruagea ovalis is a species of plant in the family Meliaceae. It is endemic to Bolivia.
