= Turraea socotrana =

Conservation status
- Vulnerable (IUCN 3.1)

Scientific classification
- Kingdom: Plantae
- Clade: Tracheophytes
- Clade: Angiosperms
- Clade: Eudicots
- Clade: Rosids
- Order: Sapindales
- Family: Meliaceae
- Genus: Turraea
- Species: T. socotrana

Binomial name
- Turraea socotrana Styles & F.White (1990)

Species of flowering plant

Turraea socotrana is a species of flowering plant in the family Meliaceae. It is a shrub or tree endemic to the island of Socotra in Yemen. It is a rare plant which grows on cliffs and in ravines in the island's central and western limestone plateaus, and less commonly on granite in the Hajhir Mountains, from 500 to 700 meters elevation.

It has attractive sweet-smelling cream-colored flowers which emerge before the leaves.
