= Humbertioturraea =

Scientific classification
- Kingdom: Plantae
- Clade: Tracheophytes
- Clade: Angiosperms
- Clade: Eudicots
- Clade: Rosids
- Order: Sapindales
- Family: Meliaceae
- Genus: Humbertioturraea; J.-F.Leroy

Genus of plants

Humbertioturraea is a genus of flowering plants belonging to the family Meliaceae.

It is native to Madagascar.

The genus name of Humbertioturraea is in honour of Jean-Henri Humbert (1887–1967), a French botanist born in Paris, and later portion of the name refers to Turraea a genus of plants in the same family of Meliaceae. The genus was first described and published by Jean-François Leroy in Compt. Rend. Hebd. Séances Acad. Sci. Séries D Vol.269 on page 2322 in 1969.

== Known species ==
According to Kew:

- Humbertioturraea baronii (C.DC.) Cheek
- Humbertioturraea decaryana (Danguy) Cheek
- Humbertioturraea grandidieri (Baill.) Cheek
- Humbertioturraea labatii Lescot & Callm.
- Humbertioturraea maculata (Sm.) Cheek
- Humbertioturraea malifolia (Baker) Cheek
- Humbertioturraea rhamnifolia (Baker) Cheek
- Humbertioturraea seyrigii J.-F.Leroy
