= Aphanamixis borneensis =

Scientific classification
- Kingdom: Plantae
- Clade: Embryophytes
- Clade: Tracheophytes
- Clade: Angiosperms
- Clade: Eudicots
- Clade: Rosids
- Order: Sapindales
- Family: Meliaceae
- Genus: Aphanamixis
- Species: A. borneensis

Binomial name
- Aphanamixis borneensis (Miq.) Merr.

Synonyms
- Amoora borneensis Miq.; Ricinocarpodendron borneense (Miq.) Mabb.; Aphanamixis pedicellata Ridl.; Aphanamixis pulgarensis Elmer

Species of tree

Aphanamixis borneensis is a tree in the family Meliaceae, native to maritime Southeast Asia. The specific epithet borneensis refers to the species' presence in Borneo.

== Description ==
Aphanamixis borneensis grows up to 13.5 metres (44 ft) tall, with a trunk diameter of up to 15 cm (6 in). The bark is reddish. The twigs are greyish. The leaves are elliptic to lanceolate and measure up to 25 cm (10 in) long. The inflorescences feature cream to pinkish flowers. The fruits are red to pink.

== Distribution and habitat ==
Aphanamixis borneensis is native to Borneo, the Philippines (Palawan) and the Maluku Islands. Its habitat is lowland, heath or hill forests, at elevations to 1,800 m (6,000 ft).
