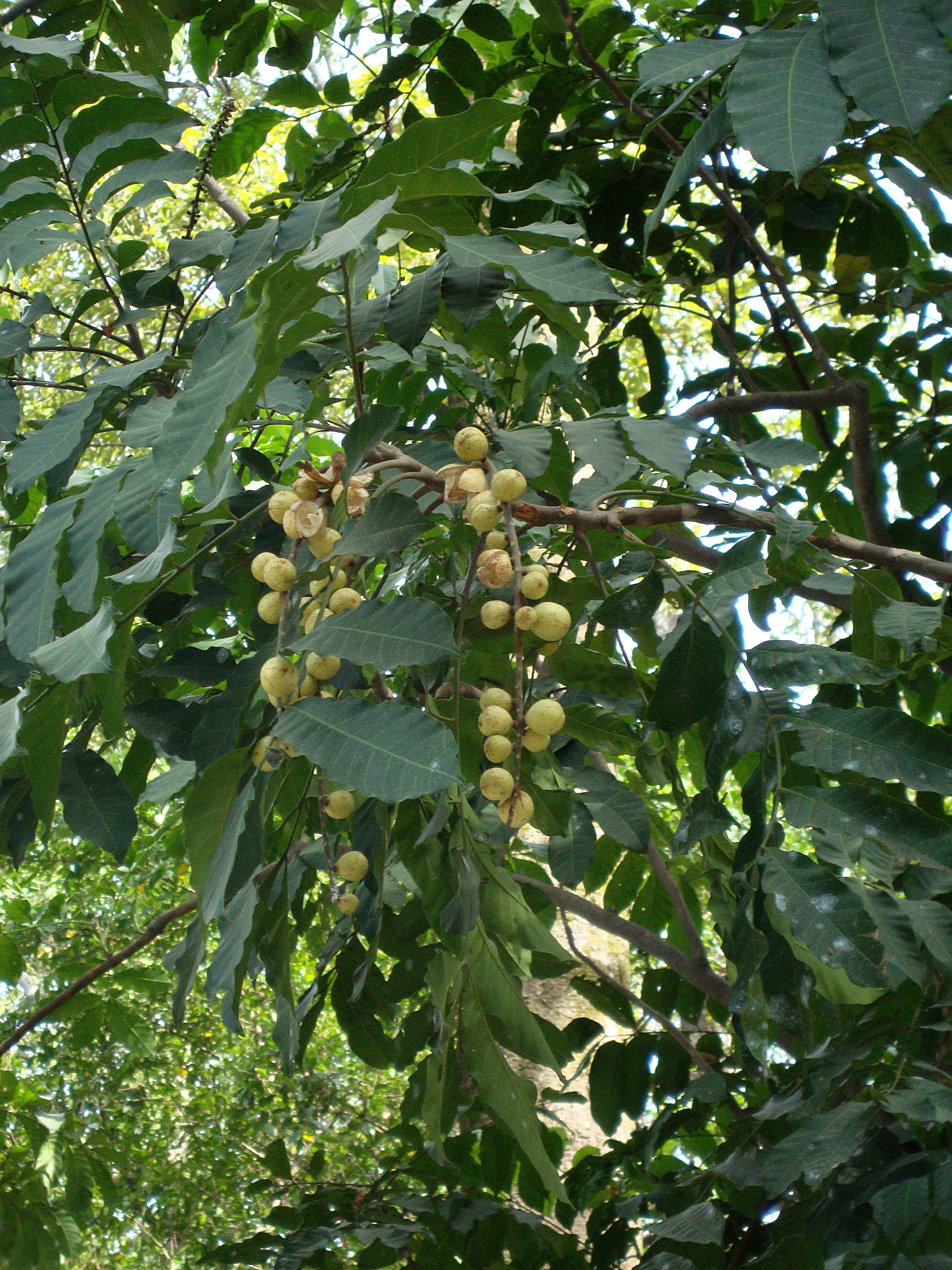
- Fruits

Conservation status
- Least Concern (IUCN 3.1)

Scientific classification
- Kingdom: Plantae
- Clade: Embryophytes
- Clade: Tracheophytes
- Clade: Angiosperms
- Clade: Eudicots
- Clade: Rosids
- Order: Sapindales
- Family: Meliaceae
- Genus: Aphanamixis
- Species: A. polystachya

Binomial name
- Aphanamixis polystachya (Wall.) R.N. Parker

Synonyms
- List: Aglaia aphanamixis Pellegr. [Illegitimate]; Aglaia beddomei (Kosterm.) S.S.Jain & R.C.Gaur; Aglaia cochinchinensis (Pierre) Pellegr.; Aglaia janowskyi Harms; Aglaia polystachya Wall.; Amoora amboinensis Miq.; Amoora beddomei Kosterm.; Amoora grandifolia Walp.; Aphanamixis agusanensis Elmer [Invalid]; Aphanamixis amboinensis (Miq.) Harms; Aphanamixis apoensis Elmer [Invalid]; Aphanamixis blumei Span. [Invalid]; Aphanamixis cochinchinensis Pierre; Aphanamixis coriacea Merr.; Aphanamixis cumingiana (C.DC.) Harms; Aphanamixis davaoensis Elmer [Invalid]; Aphanamixis elmeri (Merr.) Merr.; Aphanamixis grandiflora Blume; Aphanamixis grandifolia Blume; Aphanamixis lauterbachii Harms; Aphanamixis macrocalyx Harms; Aphanamixis myrmecophila (Warb.) Harms; Aphanamixis obliquifolia Elmer [Invalid]; Aphanamixis perrottetiana A.Juss.; Aphanamixis pinatubensis Elmer; Aphanamixis polillensis (C.B.Rob.) Merr.; Aphanamixis rohituka (Roxb.) Pierre; Aphanamixis schlechteri Harms; Aphanamixis sinensis F.C.How & T.C.Chen; Aphanamixis timorensis A.Juss.; Aphanamixis tripetala (Blanco) Merr.; Aphanamixis velutina Elmer [Invalid]; Canarium vrieseo-teysmannii H.J.Lam; Chuniodendron spicatum Hu; Chuniodendron yunnanense Hu; Dysoxylum spiciflorum Zipp. ex Miq. [Invalid]; Trichilia tripetala Blanco

= Aphanamixis polystachya =

Pithraj tree

Species of flowering plant

Aphanamixis polystachya, the pithraj tree, is a species of tree in the family Meliaceae. It is native to India, Pakistan, Nepal, Bhutan, Bangladesh, Myanmar and Sri Lanka. It is a widely used as a medicinal plant in Ayurveda.

== Description ==
The Bengali name of the tree is royna (রয়না). Another name of this tree is pithraj (পিথরাজ). Oil is not edible and can be used as biodiesel and lighting. The very fine wood is used for construction and ship-making. The tree is 20m tall. Leaves are compound, imparipinnate, alternate; oblong-lanceolate, apex acuminate; base asymmetric; with entire margin. Flowers are polygamous and show panicles inflorescence. Fruit is a single seeded pale-reddish subglobose capsule.

== Common names ==
- Assamese – hakhori bakhori
- Bengali – tiktaraj, pitraj (রয়না)
- English – rohituka tree
- Hindi – harin-hara (हरिनहर्रा), harinkhana
- Kannada – mukhyamuttage, mullumuttaga, mulluhitthalu, roheethaka
- Khasi – dieng rata
- Kuki – sahala
- Malayalam – chemmaram, sem
- Manipuri – হৈৰাঙখোঈ heirangkhoi
- Marathi – raktharohida (रक्तरोहिडा')
- Rongmei – agan
- Sanskrit – anavallabha, ksharayogya, lakshmi, lakshmivana, lohita
- Sinhala – higul
- Tamil – malampuluvan, sem, semmaram
- Telugu – chevamanu, rohitaka

== Chemistry ==
The fruit shell contains triterpenes, aphanamixin. The bark contains tetranortriterpene, and aphanamixinin. The leaves contain diterpene, alcohol, aphanamixol and β-sitosterol. The seeds yield a limonoid, rohitukin, polystachin and others, an alkaloid, a glycoside and a saponin. A chromone and three flavonoid glycosides have been reported from the roots.
