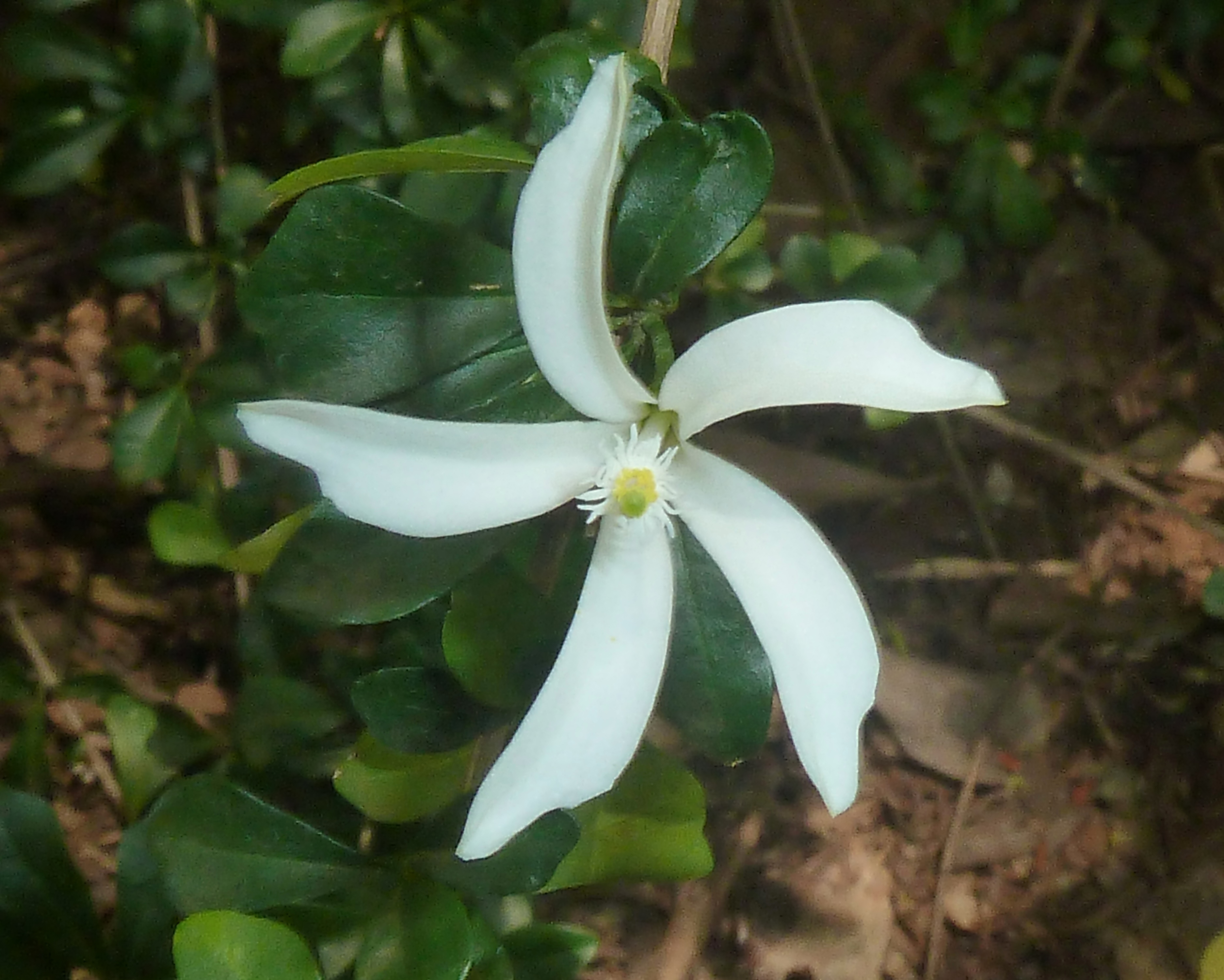
- Close-up of flower
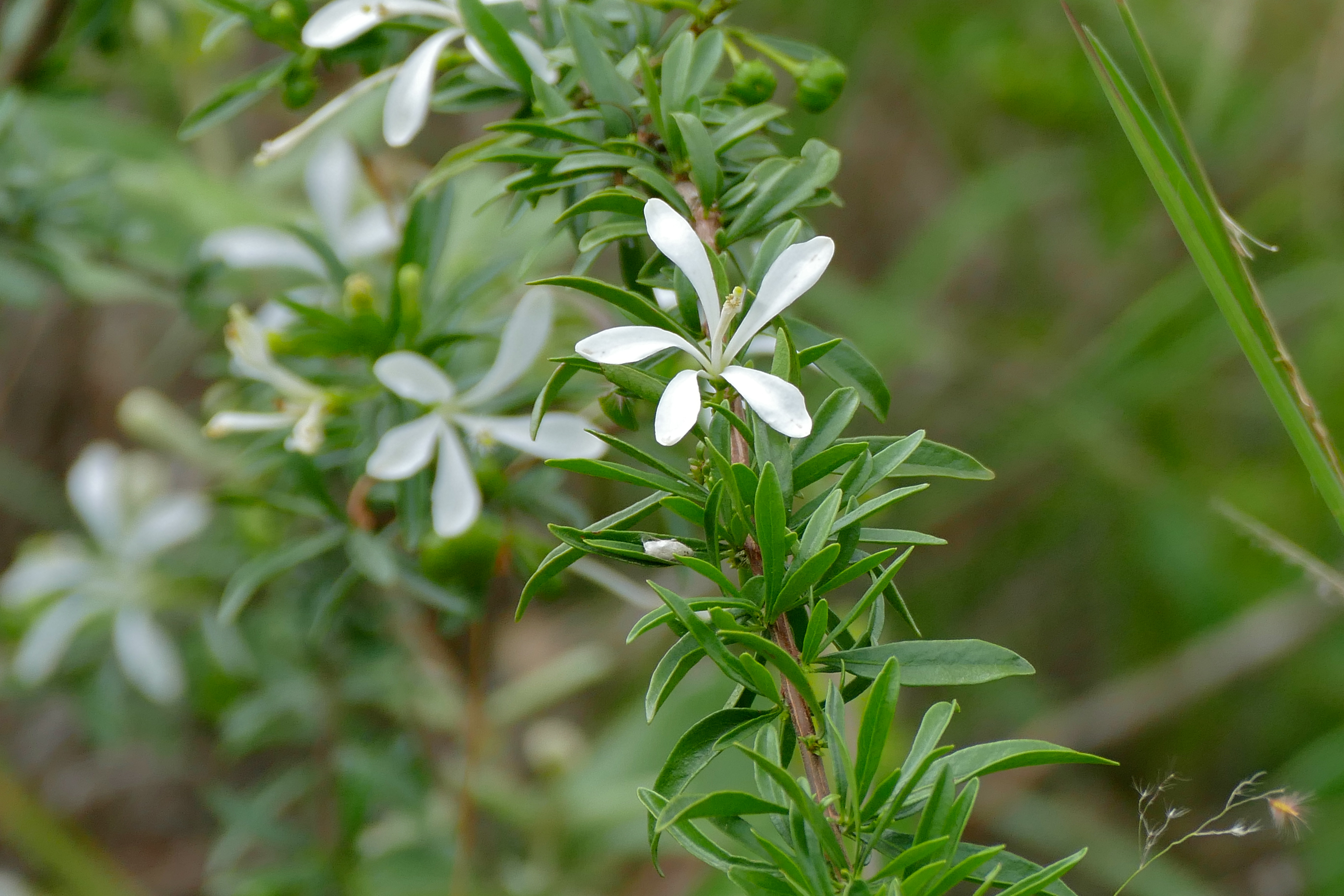
- Stem, leaves, and flowers

Conservation status
- Least Concern (IUCN 3.1)

Scientific classification
- Kingdom: Plantae
- Clade: Tracheophytes
- Clade: Angiosperms
- Clade: Eudicots
- Clade: Rosids
- Order: Sapindales
- Family: Meliaceae
- Genus: Turraea
- Species: T. obtusifolia

Binomial name
- Turraea obtusifolia Hochst.

Synonyms
- Rutaea obtusifolia (Hochst.) M.Roem.; Turraea oblancifolia Bremek.; Turraea obtusifolia var. matopensis Baker f.; Turraea obtusifolia var. microphylla C.DC.

= Turraea obtusifolia =

Species of plant

Turraea obtusifolia, the small honeysuckle tree, small honeysuckle bush, or South African honeysuckle, is a species of flowering plant in the family Meliaceae, native to Botswana, Zimbabwe, Mozambique, Eswatini, and South Africa. Typically 1 to 5 m (2 to 15 ft) tall and spreading 1 to 3 m (2 to 10 ft) wide, it is hardy in USDA zones 10 through 11, and is recommended for containers and suggested for bonsai.
