= Vavaea amicorum =

- In the Northern Territory, Australia

Conservation status
- Least Concern (IUCN 3.1)

Scientific classification
- Kingdom: Plantae
- Clade: Tracheophytes
- Clade: Angiosperms
- Clade: Eudicots
- Clade: Rosids
- Order: Sapindales
- Family: Meliaceae
- Genus: Vavaea
- Species: V. amicorum

Binomial name
- Vavaea amicorum Benth.

Synonyms
- 26 synonyms: Vitex bantamensis Koord. & Valeton; Beilschmiedia brassii C.K.Allen; Lamiofrutex papuanus Lauterb.; Vavaea archboldiana Merr. & L.M.Perry; Vavaea ardisioides Elmer; Vavaea australiana S.T.Blake; Vavaea bantamensis (Koord. & Valeton) Koord. & Merr.; Vavaea bougainvillensis B.L.Burtt; Vavaea brassii (C.K.Allen) Kosterm.; Vavaea brevipedunculata Sa.Kurata; Vavaea chalmersii C.DC.; Vavaea chalmersii var. angustifolia Merr. & L.M.Perry; Vavaea harveyi Seem.; Vavaea heterophylla Merr.; Vavaea kajewskii Merr. & L.M.Perry; Vavaea lamii Steenis; Vavaea ledermannii Harms; Vavaea oligantha B.L.Burtt; Vavaea pachyphylla Merr.; Vavaea pauciflora Ridl.; Vavaea pauciflora Volkens; Vavaea pilosa Merr.; Vavaea retusa Merr.; Vavaea scaevoloides Guillaumin; Vavaea surigaoensis Elmer; Vavaea vitiensis Seem.

Species of flowering plant

Vavaea amicorum is a tree in the family Meliaceae. The specific epithet amicorum means 'of friends' and refers to the Friendly Islands (Tonga), a part of the species' native distribution.

== Description ==
Herbarium specimen

Vavaea amicorum grows as a small tree, occasionally to 30 metres (100 ft) tall, with a bole diameter of up to 30 cm (12 in). Its smooth bark is brown, with lenticels. The leaves are obovate to oblanceolate and measure up to 22 cm (9 in) long. The roundish fruits are purplish black.

== Distribution and habitat ==
Vavaea amicorum is native to maritime Southeast Asia from Sumatra east to New Guinea. It is also native to tropical Australia, the Federated States of Micronesia, Fiji, Tonga and Vanuatu. Its habitat is in forests, to elevations of 1,150 m (3,800 ft). The species is present in protected areas such as, in Fiji, Nadarivatu Forest Reserve and Yadua Taba, an island wildlife sanctuary where it is the most important food of the critically endangered Fiji crested iguana (Brachylophus vitiensis).

== Uses ==
The wood is locally used in construction and for furniture in New Guinea and the Philippines. The wood is used as incense in Sabah, Borneo.
