= Malleastrum depauperatum =

Conservation status
- Vulnerable (IUCN 2.3)

Scientific classification
- Kingdom: Plantae
- Clade: Tracheophytes
- Clade: Angiosperms
- Clade: Eudicots
- Clade: Rosids
- Order: Sapindales
- Family: Meliaceae
- Genus: Malleastrum
- Species: M. depauperatum

Binomial name
- Malleastrum depauperatum (Baill.) J.-F.Leroy

Synonyms
- Malleastrum leroyi Fosberg

Species of flowering plant

Malleastrum depauperatum is a species of plant in the family Meliaceae. It is endemic to Comoros and Aldabra in the Seychelles. It is also known by the synonym Malleastrum leroyi.
