= Astrotrichilia elegans =

Scientific classification
- Kingdom: Plantae
- Clade: Tracheophytes
- Clade: Angiosperms
- Clade: Eudicots
- Clade: Rosids
- Order: Sapindales
- Family: Meliaceae
- Genus: Astrotrichilia
- Species: A. elegans

Binomial name
- Astrotrichilia elegans J.-F. Leroy & Lescot, 1996

Species of flowering plant

Astrotrichilia elegans is a species of plants in the family Meliaceae. It is found in Madagascar.
