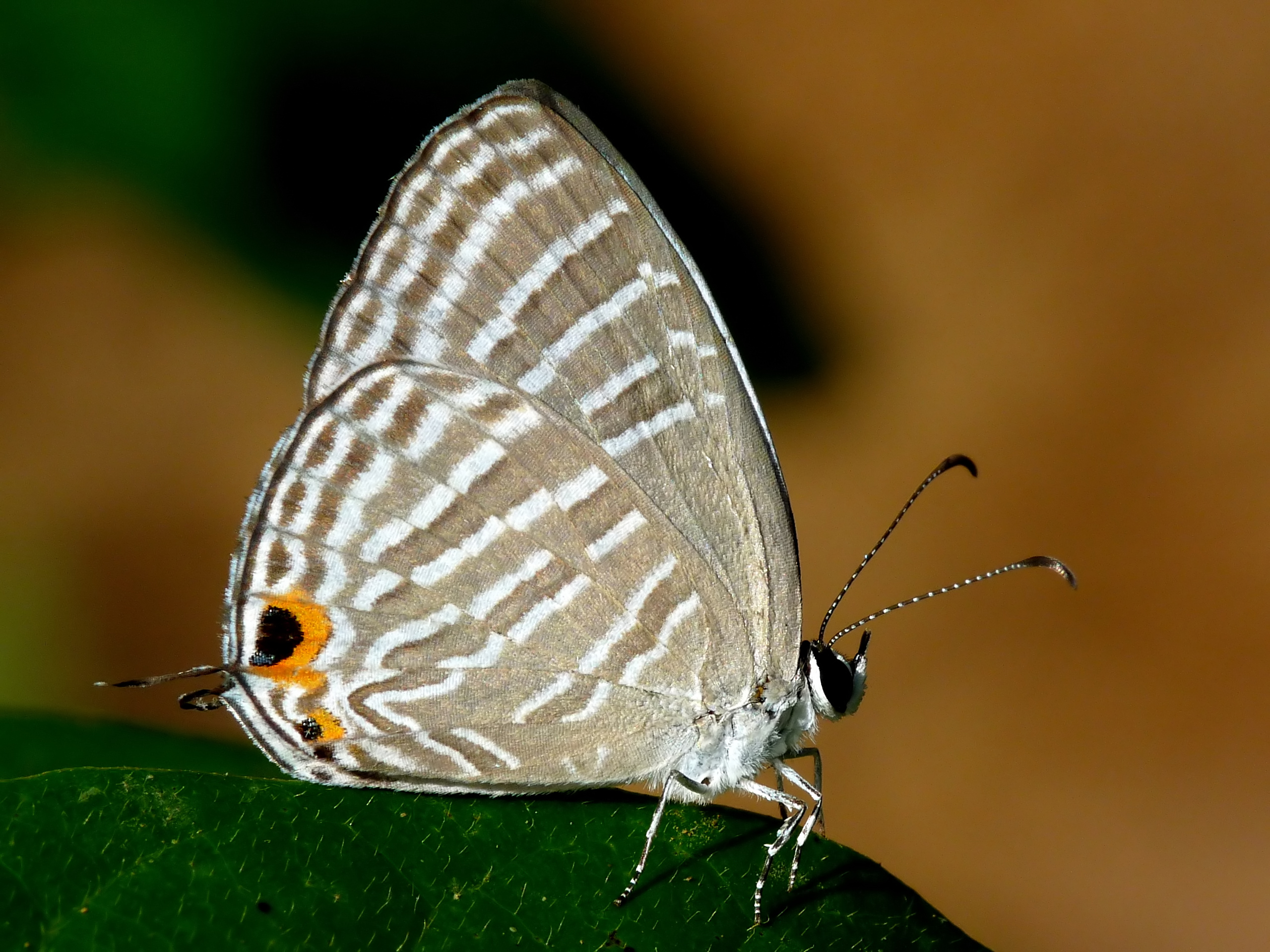
- Wet-season form

Scientific classification
- Domain: Eukaryota
- Kingdom: Animalia
- Phylum: Arthropoda
- Class: Insecta
- Order: Lepidoptera
- Family: Lycaenidae
- Genus: Jamides
- Species: J. celeno

Binomial name
- Jamides celeno (Cramer, 1775)

= Jamides celeno =

Common cerulean

Species of butterfly

Jamides celeno, the common cerulean, is a small butterfly found in Indomalayan realm belonging to the lycaenids or blues family. The species was first described by Pieter Cramer in 1775.

== Description ==
Like many tropical butterflies, this species shows seasonal polyphenism, with the appearance differing between adults according to the season.

=== Dry-season brood ===
Male upperside has the ground colour pale bluish white. The forewing has the terminal margin narrowly edged with black that broadens very slightly towards the apex of the wing; the cilia are brownish black.

The hindwing is uniformly coloured, except for an anteciliary black line faintly edged on the inner side by a white line within which and touching it is a row of black spots, the anterior spots very faint, the spot in interspace 2 large and well-defined, two geminate (paired) spots in interspace 1 and a very small black lunular dot in interspace 1a; cilia brown, white at the base in the interspaces. In specimens obtained in the height of the dry season the black edging to the termen of the forewing is much reduced and the subterminal series of black spots in the hindwing is altogether missing.

The underside is greyish brown. The forewing has seven transverse white bands as follows: two short bands one each side of the discocellulars, the inner one continued downwards to vein 1 and both represented at the costa by two detached spots; two parallel discal bands, the inner one broken at and the outer one terminating on vein 3; two parallel subterminal bands, the outer one slightly lunular; lastly, a more slender terminal band followed by an anteciliary slender black line; the dorsal margin narrowly white; cilia brownish black, their bases white in the interspaces. Hindwing: crossed by nine white bands or lines as follows: three between base of wing and apex of cell, those posteriorly in interspace 1 or on vein 1 abruptly turn upwards and terminate on the dorsum; the first band beyond the cell extends from vein 6 to vein 2, then curves upwards in interspace 1; the next extends straight from just below the costa to vein 4, thus overlapping the previous band for a short distance; the next or postdiscal band runs between the costa and vein 3, the subterminal two also between the costa and vein 3 but the inner one of the two bands is extended down to interspace 1 and there curves upwards towards the dorsum; both the subterminal bands are more or less lunular; in the interspace below vein 2 is a large subterminal black spot speckled with metallic blue scales and bordered inwardly by ochraceous orange; there are also in interspaces la and 1 two black dots inwardly edged by a short white streak set in an ochraceous background; lastly, there is a complete terminal white line followed by a black anteciliary line and a filamentous short black white-tipped tail at apex of vein 2; cilia as on the upperside. Antennae brownish black, the shafts as usual tinged with white; head, thorax and abdomen pale brown, bluish on thorax and base of abdomen; beneath: the palpi, thorax and abdomen white, the third joint of the palpi and the second joint anteriorly black.

The female has the upperside ground colour paler than in the male, often quite white; terminal black edging to forewing very much broader, broadest at apex, its margin there diffuse. Hindwing: differs from that of the male as follows: costal margin broadly dusky black; a postdiscal transverse series of dusky-black connected lunules often more or less obsolescent; this is followed by a series of black spots each set in a background of the white ground colour; an anteciliary slender black line as in the male. The underside ground colour is paler than in the male, the markings however are identical. Antenna, head, thorax and abdomen as in the male.

=== Wet-season brood ===
Closely resembles the males and females of the dry-season brood; the markings are similar but the ground colour is generally darker both on the upper and undersides, while the black edging to the forewing and the black postdiscal and terminal markings to the hindwing on the upperside are broader and more clearly defined. Antennae, head, thorax and abdomen as in the dry-season brood.

== Larva ==
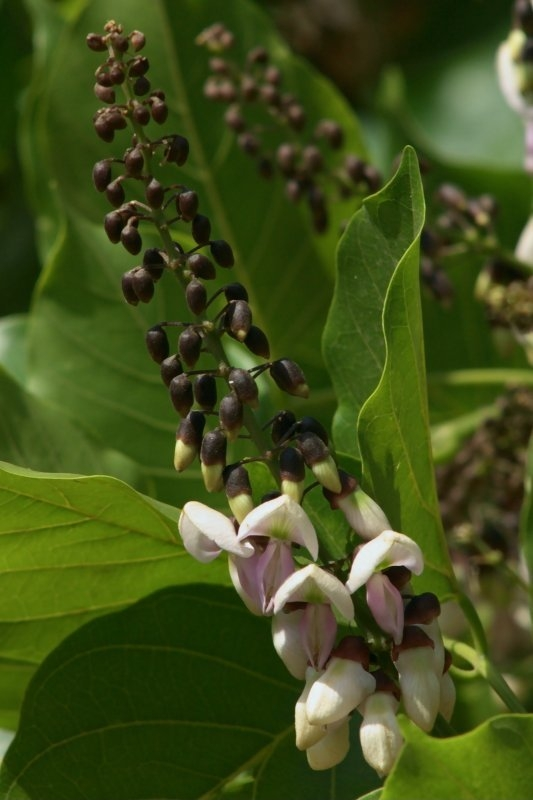
Pongam or honge (Pongamia pinnata) is one of the food plants for Jamides celeno

"When full-fed just an inch in length, of a dull reddish-green colour, thickly shagreened with minute white tubercles, scarcely, if at all, hairy; the head pale ochraceous, entirely hidden beneath the second segment; the segments increasing in width to about the fifth, the two anal segments slightly decreasing and above flattened, especially the thirteenth; the erectile organs very small; a dorsal pulsating line, somewhat darker than the rest of the body; a subdorsal series of pale green oblique streaks, one on each segment on each side from the third to the eleventh segment inclusive; no other conspicuous markings. Dr. Forel has identified the ant that attends the larva in Calcutta, as Camponotus mitis, Smith. Dr. G. King identifies the plant on which the larva feeds in Calcutta as Heynea trijuga, Roxburgh." (de Nicéville quoted by Bingham)

Other food plants noted include Atylosia albicans.

== Larval host plants ==
- Abrus precatorius
- Cajanus albicans
- Butea monosperma
- Phaseolus adenanthus
- Millettia pinnata
- Saraca asoca
- Xylia xylocarpa
- Heynea trijuga
- Trichilia hirta
- Trichilia trijuga
- Elettaria cardamomum

== Pupa ==
"Of the usual Lycaenid shape, quite smooth, neither hairy nor pitted, pale ochreous greenish, the upper portions of the abdominal segments darker, covered throughout with coarse, rounded, blackish spots placed irregularly; a dorsal and a subdorsal series of similar but larger spots or blotches placed regularly. Head bluntly rounded, thorax slightly humped and constricted posteriorly, end of the abdomen rounded." (Lionel de Nicéville quoted by Bingham)

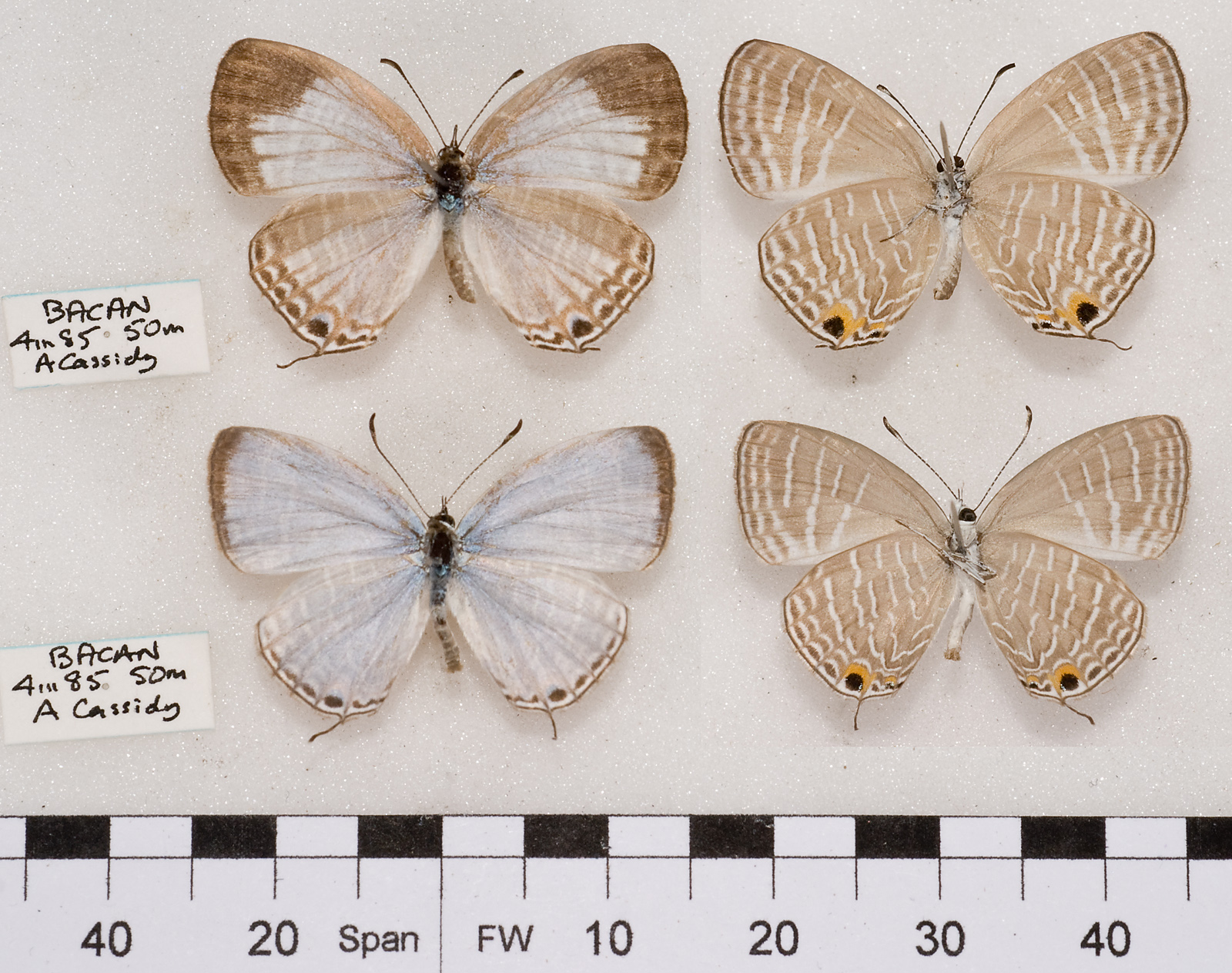
Dorsal and ventral views

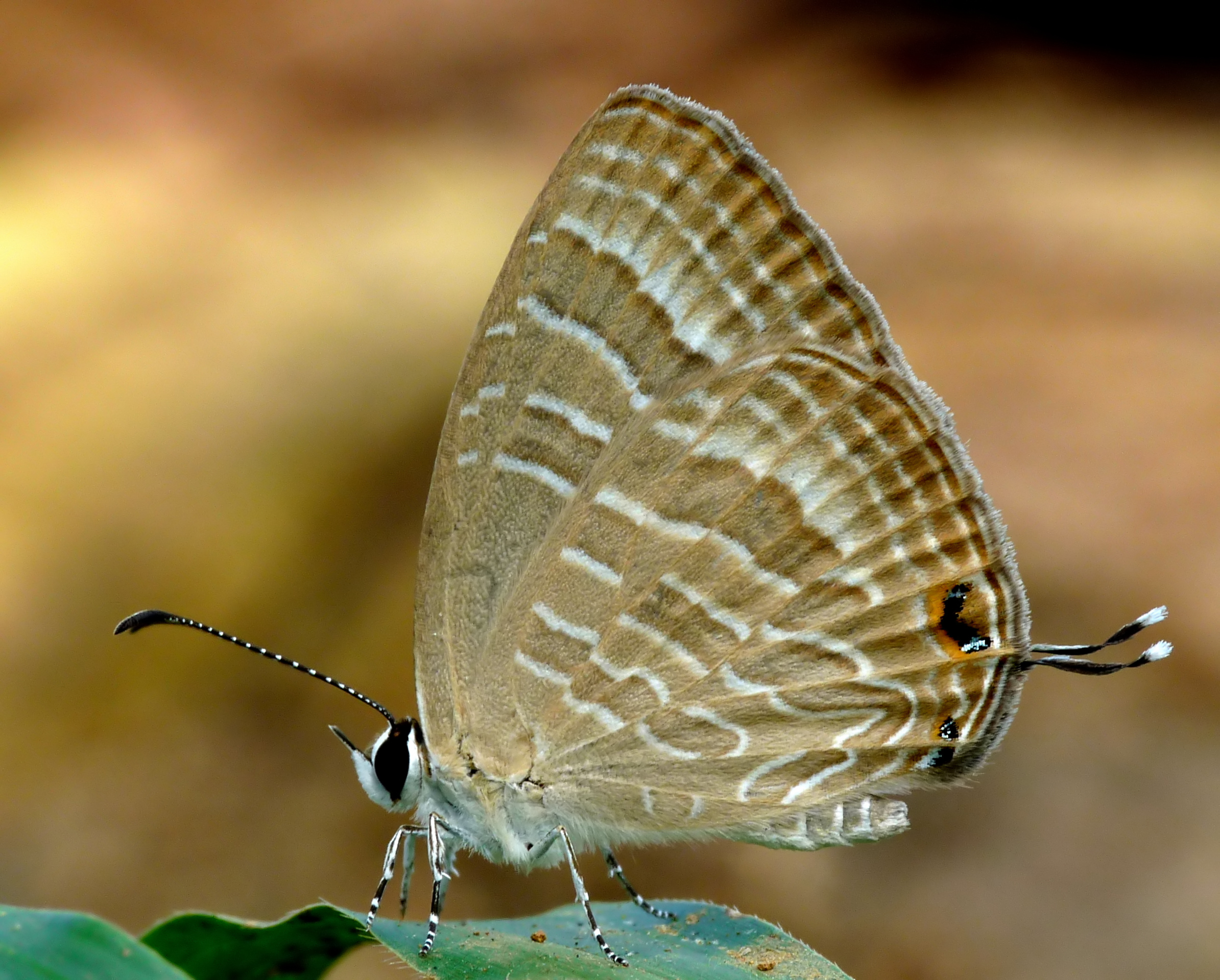
Dry-season form

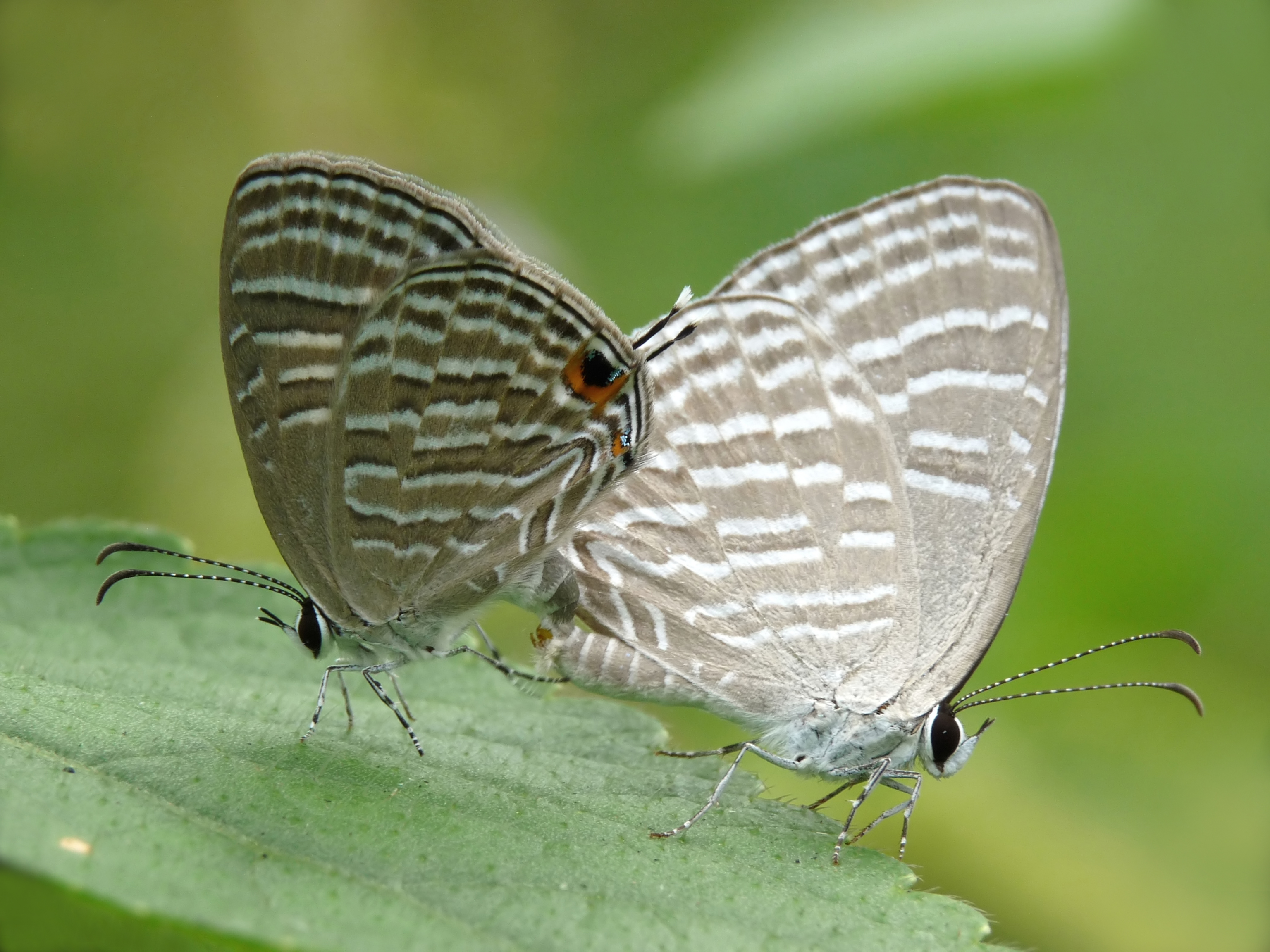
Mating

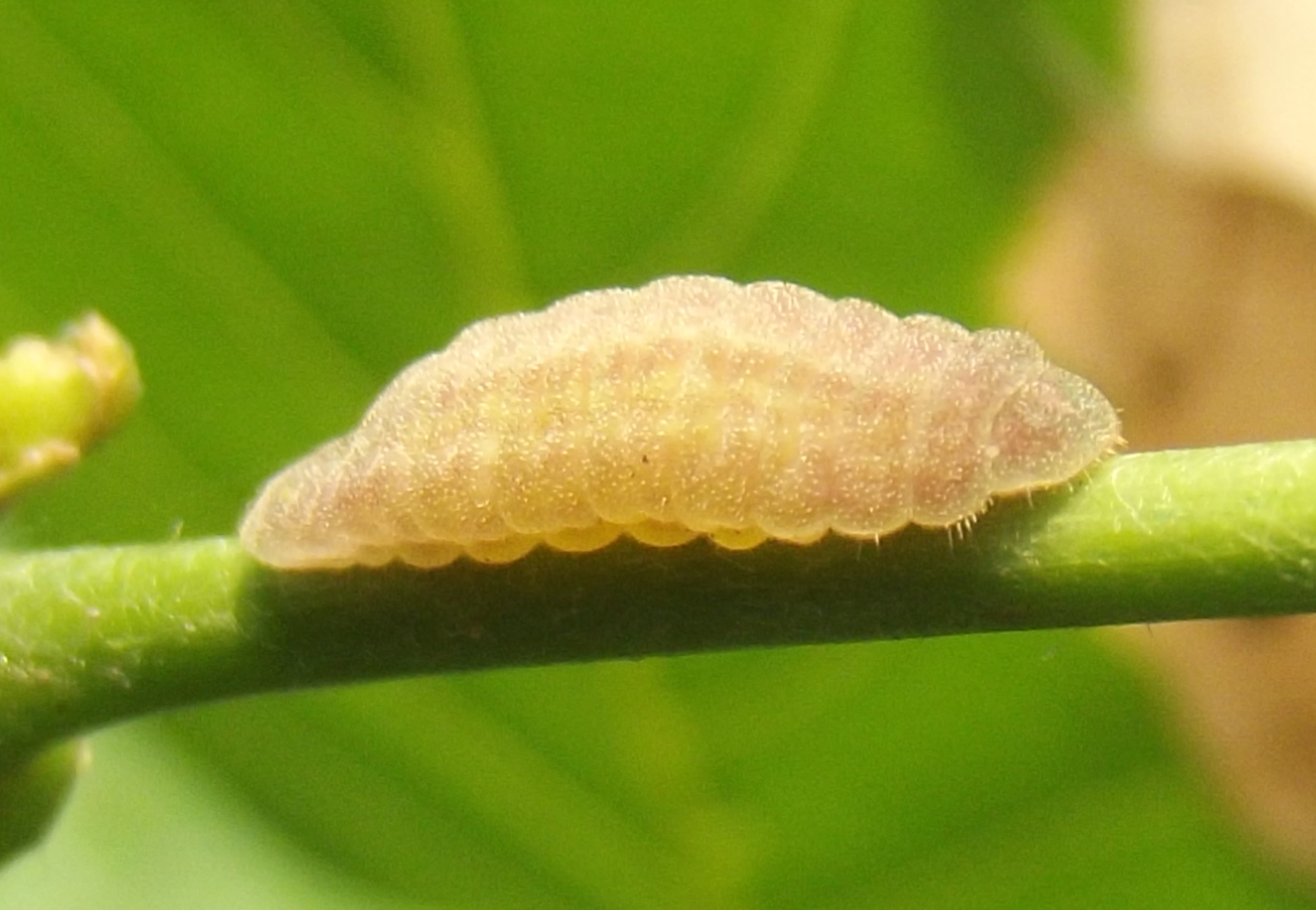
Larva

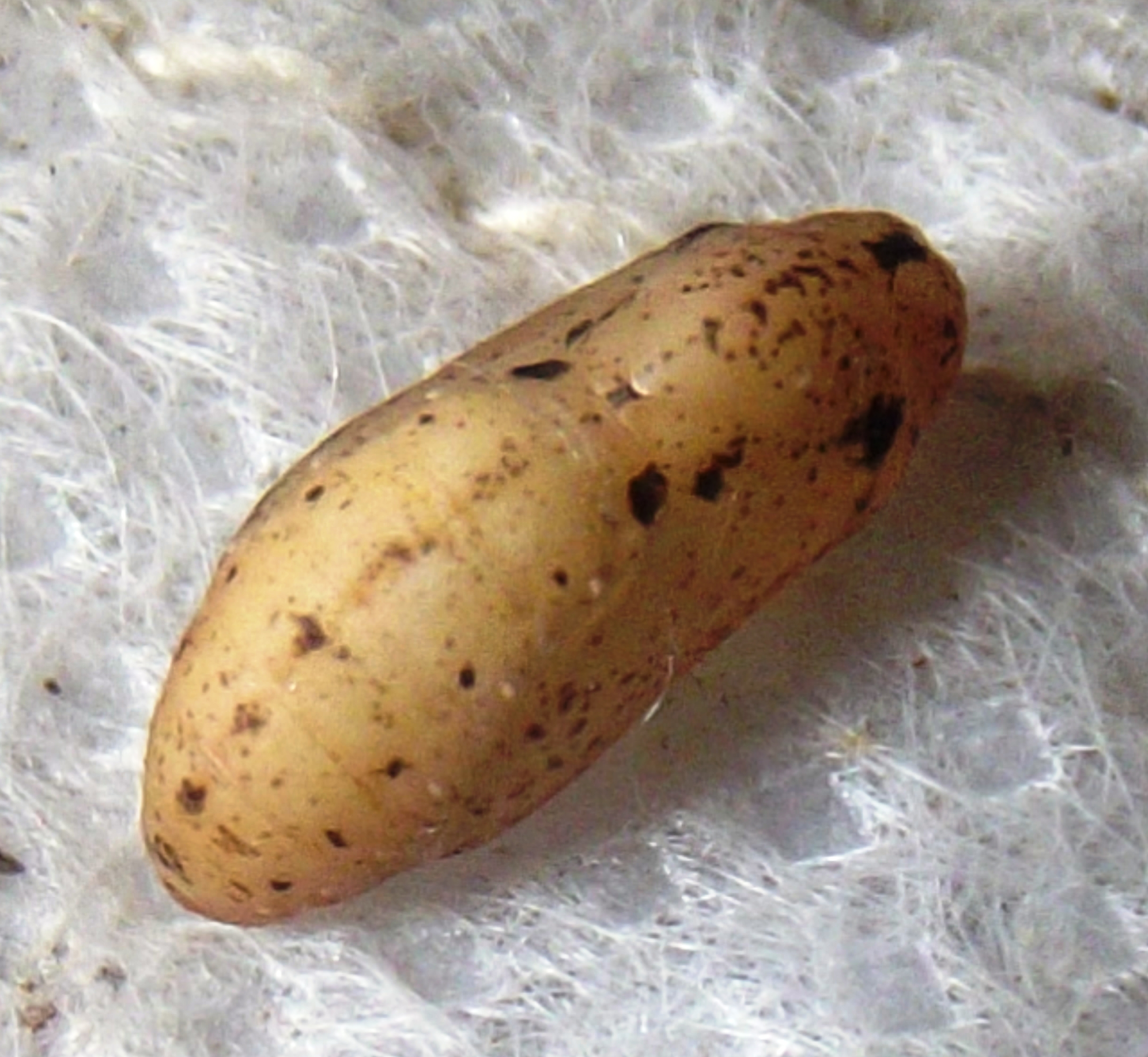
Pupa

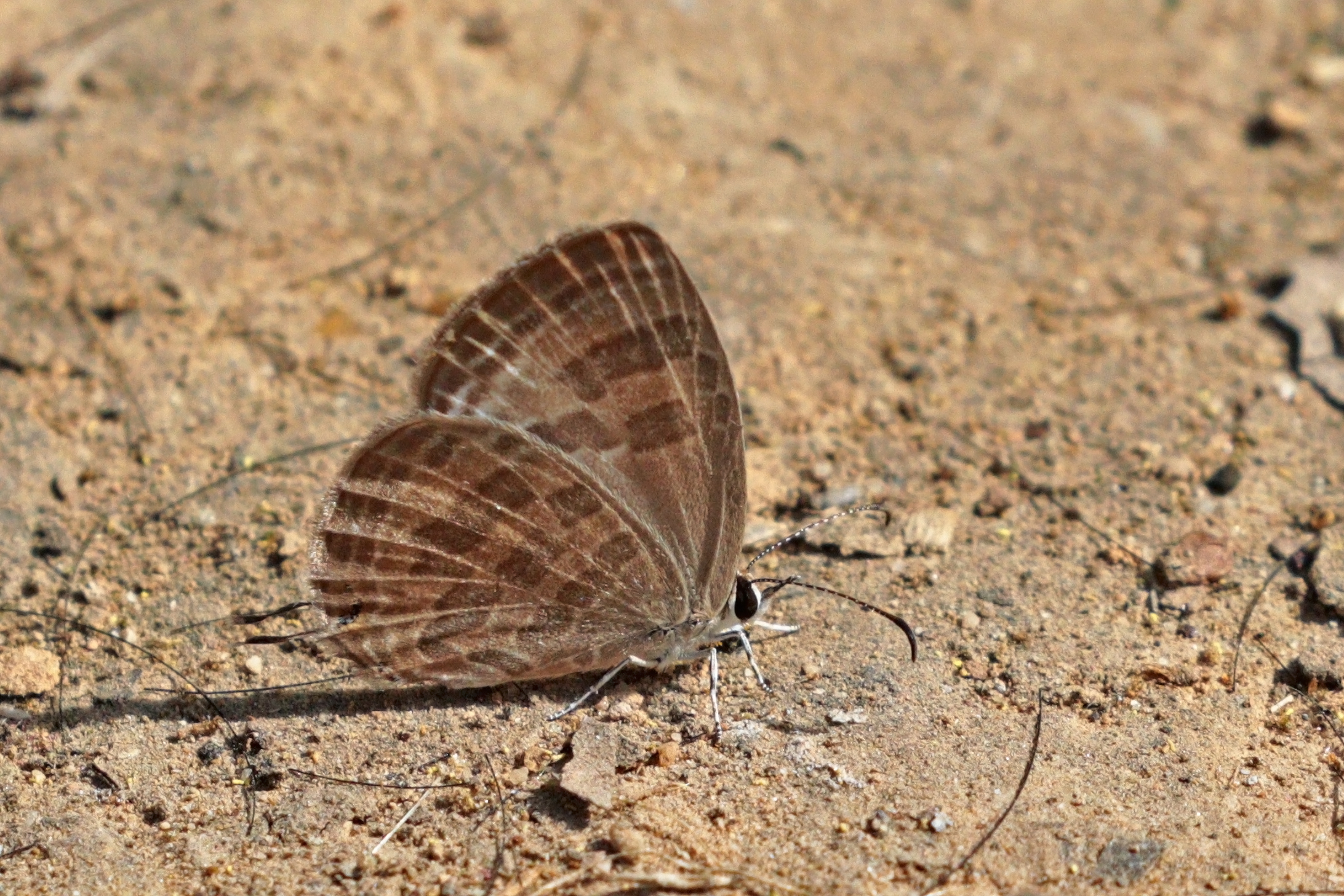
J. c. aelianus, Nepal

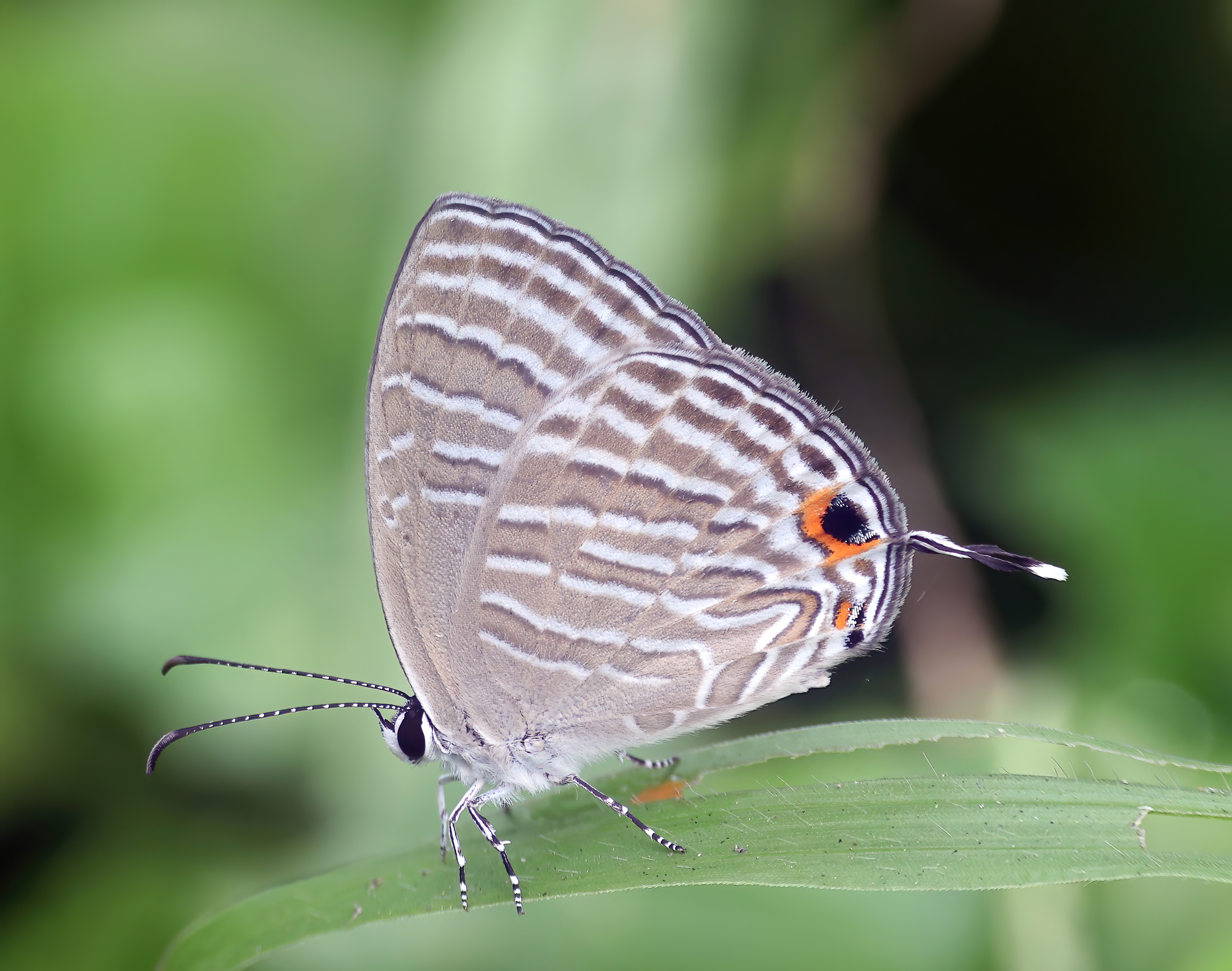
J. c. tissama. Sri Lanka

== See also ==
- List of butterflies of India
- List of butterflies of India (Lycaenidae)
