= Turraea adjanohounii =

Conservation status
- Vulnerable (IUCN 2.3)

Scientific classification
- Kingdom: Plantae
- Clade: Tracheophytes
- Clade: Angiosperms
- Clade: Eudicots
- Clade: Rosids
- Order: Sapindales
- Family: Meliaceae
- Genus: Turraea
- Species: T. adjanohounii

Binomial name
- Turraea adjanohounii Aké Assi

Species of tree

Turraea adjanohounii is a species of forest tree in the family Meliaceae. It is endemic to Côte d'Ivoire where it is one of the rare and endangered species known to grow in Taï National Park, one of the last remaining areas of primary rain forest in western Africa. The tree is threatened by habitat loss and by harvesting for timber.
