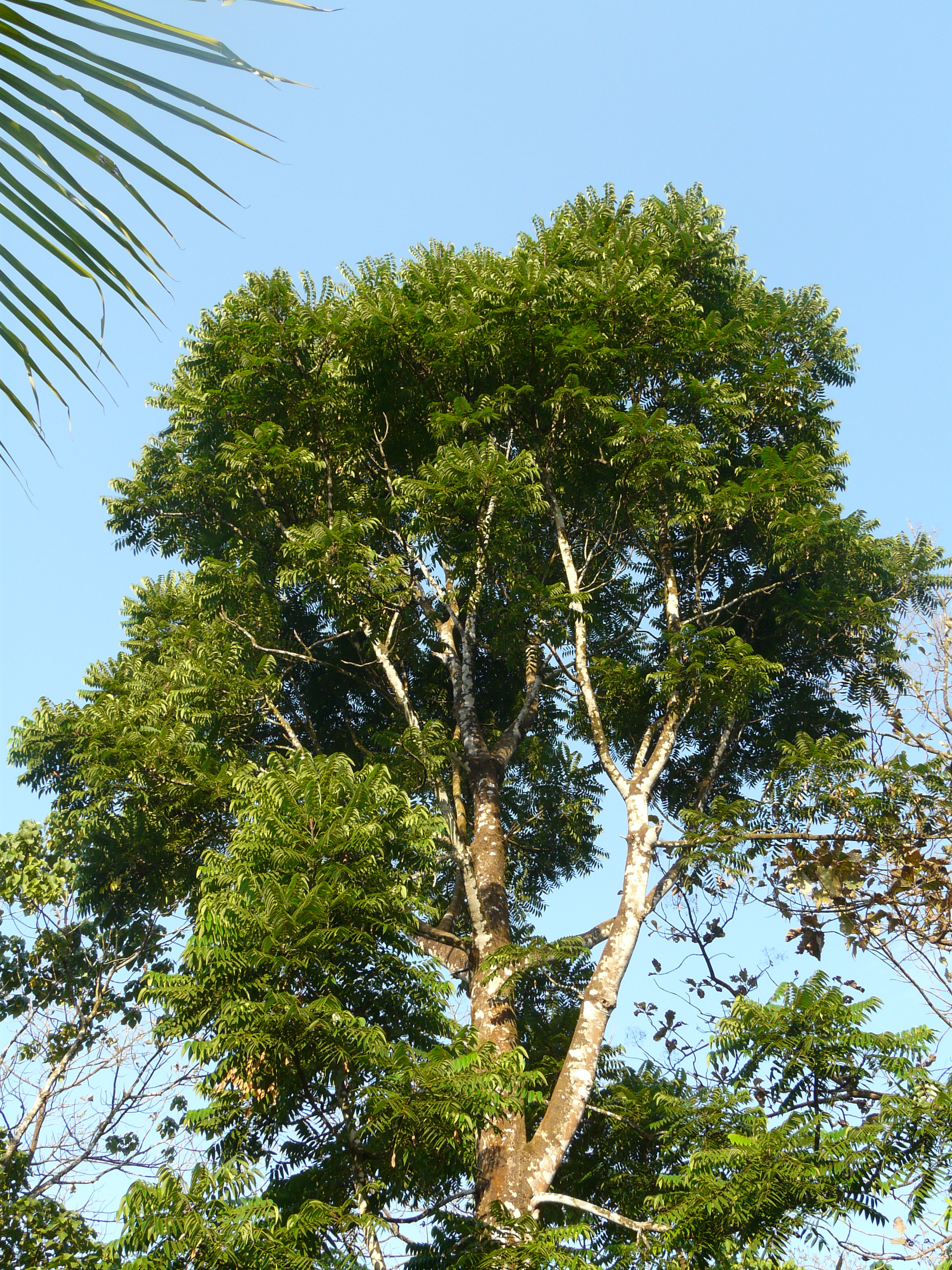
- Aphanamixis polystachya

Scientific classification
- Kingdom: Plantae
- Clade: Tracheophytes
- Clade: Angiosperms
- Clade: Eudicots
- Clade: Rosids
- Order: Sapindales
- Family: Meliaceae
- Subfamily: Melioideae
- Genus: Aphanamixis; Blume

Species
- See text

Synonyms
- Chuniodendron Hu; Ricinocarpodendron Boehm.

= Aphanamixis =

Genus of flowering plants

Aphanamixis is a genus of plants in the family Meliaceae, native to Asia.

== Species ==
As of March 2024, Plants of the World Online accepted the following species:

- Aphanamixis borneensis (Miq.) Merr.
- Aphanamixis polystachya (Wall.) R.Parker
- Aphanamixis sumatrana (Miq.) Harms
