= Malleastrum =

Scientific classification
- Kingdom: Plantae
- Clade: Tracheophytes
- Clade: Angiosperms
- Clade: Eudicots
- Clade: Rosids
- Order: Sapindales
- Family: Meliaceae
- Subfamily: Melioideae
- Genus: Malleastrum (Baill.) J.-F.Leroy

Genus of flowering plants

Malleastrum is a genus of plants in the family Meliaceae containing 21 species native to Madagascar, Comoros and Aldabra.

== Species ==
The genus Malleastrum contains the following 21 species:

- Malleastrum antsingyense J.-F.Leroy
- Malleastrum boivinianum (Baill.) J.-F.Leroy
- Malleastrum contractum J.-F.Leroy
- Malleastrum depauperatum (Baill.) J.-F.Leroy (synonym:Malleastrum leroyi Fosberg)
- Malleastrum gracile J.-F.Leroy
- Malleastrum horokoke J.-F.Leroy
- Malleastrum isalense J.-F.Leroy
- Malleastrum letouzeyanum J.-F.Leroy
- Malleastrum mandenense J.-F.Leroy
- Malleastrum minutifoliolatum J.-F.Leroy
- Malleastrum mocquerysii (C.DC.) J.-F.Leroy
- Malleastrum obtusifolium (C.DC.) J.-F.Leroy
- Malleastrum orientale J.-F.Leroy
- Malleastrum perrieri J.-F.Leroy
- Malleastrum pseudodepauperatum J.-F.Leroy
- Malleastrum rakotozafyi Cheek
- Malleastrum ramiflorum (C.DC.) J.-F.Leroy
- Malleastrum sambiranense J.-F.Leroy
- Malleastrum schatzii J.-F.Leroy & Lescot
- Malleastrum sepaliferum J.-F.Leroy & Cheek
- Malleastrum tampolense J.-F.Leroy

== See also ==
- Francis Raymond Fosberg
