= Astrotrichilia =

Scientific classification
- Kingdom: Plantae
- Clade: Tracheophytes
- Clade: Angiosperms
- Clade: Eudicots
- Clade: Rosids
- Order: Sapindales
- Family: Meliaceae
- Subfamily: Melioideae
- Genus: Astrotrichilia (Harms) T.D.Penn. & Styles

Species
- See text

Synonyms
- Trichilia sect. Astrotrichilia Harms

Genus of flowering plants

Astrotrichilia is a genus of plants in the family Meliaceae.

== Species ==
- Astrotrichilia asterotricha
- Astrotrichilia diegoensis
- Astrotrichilia elegans
- Astrotrichilia elliotii
- Astrotrichilia masoalensis
- Astrotrichilia parvifolia
- Astrotrichilia procera
- Astrotrichilia rakodomena
- Astrotrichilia thouvenotii
- Astrotrichilia valiandra
- Astrotrichilia voamatata
- Astrotrichilia zombitsyensis
