= Vavaea =

Scientific classification
- Kingdom: Plantae
- Clade: Tracheophytes
- Clade: Angiosperms
- Clade: Eudicots
- Clade: Rosids
- Order: Sapindales
- Family: Meliaceae
- Subfamily: Melioideae
- Genus: Vavaea; Benth.

Synonyms
- Lamiofrutex Lauterb.

Genus of flowering plants

Vavaea is a genus of plants in the family Meliaceae.

As of April 2024, Plants of the World Online accepted the following species:

- Vavaea amicorum Benth.
- Vavaea degeneri A.C.Sm.
- Vavaea megaphylla C.H.Wright
- Vavaea papuana F.M.Bailey
- Vavaea tubiflora T.D.Penn.
