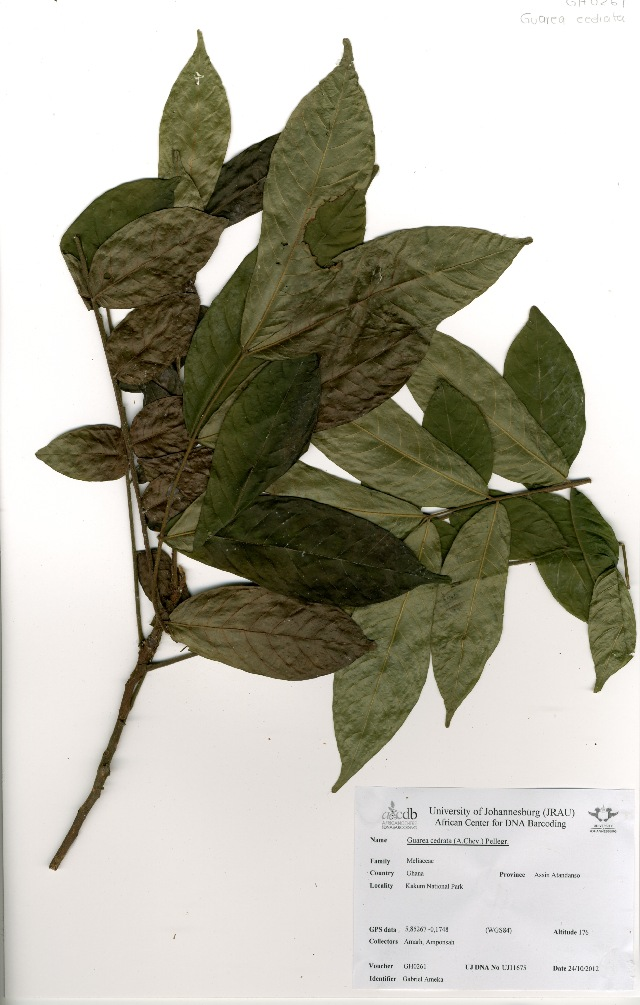
- Specimen of white guarea (Leplaea cedrata, syn. Guarea cedrata) collected at Kakum National Park (Assin Atandanso; though documented so, the coordinates indicate Aburi Botanical Gardens), Ghana.

Scientific classification
- Kingdom: Plantae
- Clade: Embryophytes
- Clade: Tracheophytes
- Clade: Spermatophytes
- Clade: Angiosperms
- Clade: Eudicots
- Clade: Rosids
- Order: Sapindales
- Family: Meliaceae
- Subfamily: Melioideae
- Genus: Leplaea; Vermoesen

= Leplaea =

Genus of plants

Leplaea is a genus of flowering plants belonging to the family Meliaceae.

Its native range is western Tropical Africa to Uganda. It is found in Cabinda Province (of Angola), Cameroon, Central African Republic, Congo, Equatorial Guinea, Gabon, Ghana, Guinea, Ivory Coast, Liberia, Nigeria, Sierra Leone, Uganda and Zaïre.

The genus name of Leplaea is in honour of Edmond Leplae (1868–1941), a Belgian agricultural engineer, professor of agriculture in Liège. It was first described and published in Rev. Zool. Bot. Africaines Vol.9 (Suppl. Bot.) on page 61 in 1921.

== Known species ==
According to Kew:

- Leplaea adenopunctata E.J.M.Koenen & J.J.de Wilde
- Leplaea cauliflora E.J.M.Koenen & J.J.de Wilde
- Leplaea cedrata (A.Chev.) E.J.M.Koenen & J.J.de Wilde
- Leplaea laurentii (De Wild.) E.J.M.Koenen & J.J.de Wilde
- Leplaea mangenotiana (Aké Assi & Lorougnon) E.J.M.Koenen & J.J.de Wilde
- Leplaea mayombensis (Pellegr.) Staner
- Leplaea thompsonii (Sprague & Hutch.) E.J.M.Koenen & J.J.de Wilde
