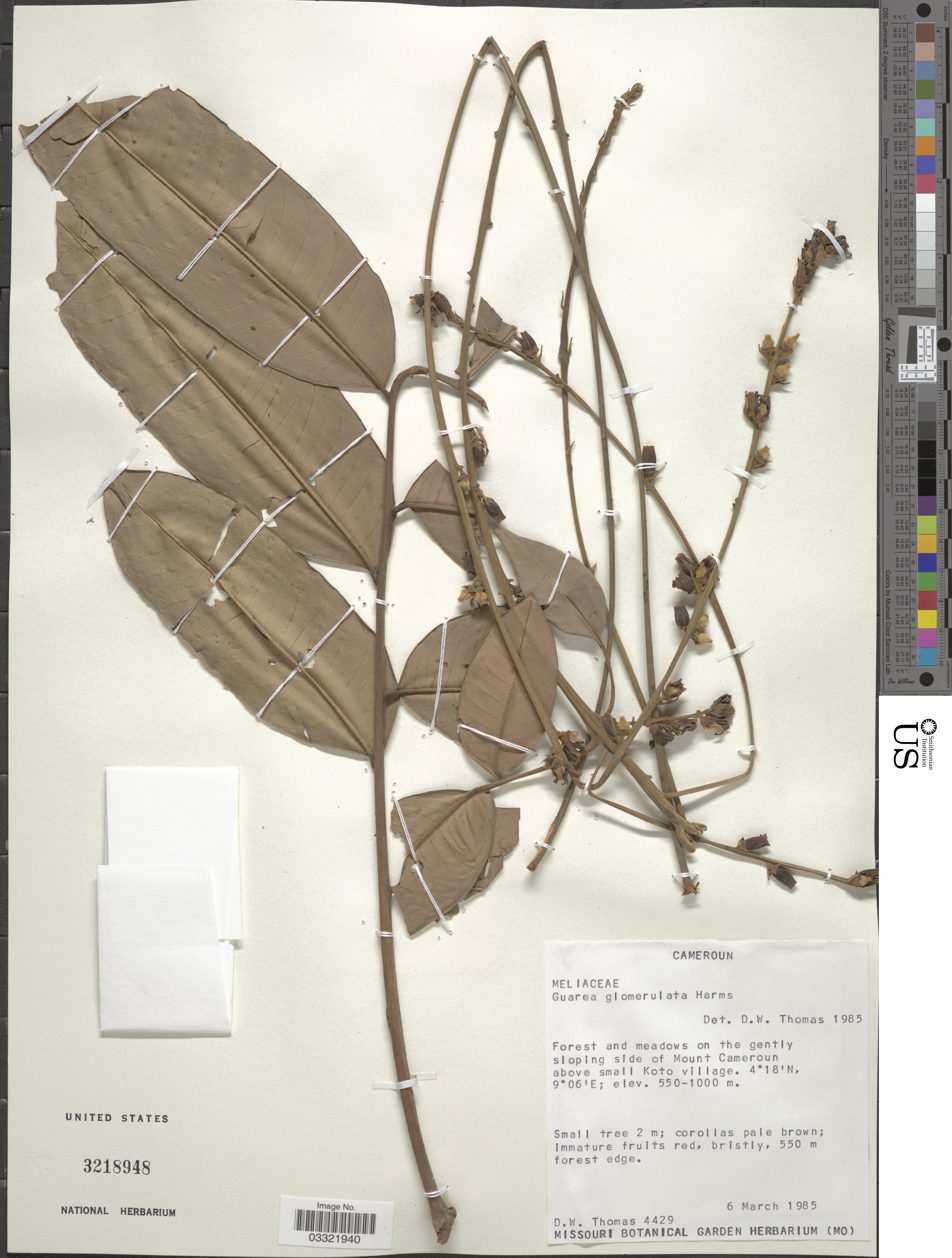

Conservation status
- Least Concern (IUCN 3.1)

Scientific classification
- Kingdom: Plantae
- Clade: Tracheophytes
- Clade: Angiosperms
- Clade: Eudicots
- Clade: Rosids
- Order: Sapindales
- Family: Meliaceae
- Subfamily: Melioideae
- Genus: Neoguarea (Harms) E.J.M.Koenen & J.J.de Wilde (2012)
- Species: N. glomerulata

Binomial name
- Neoguarea glomerulata (Harms) E.J.M.Koenen & J.J.de Wilde (2012)

Synonyms
- Guarea claessensii De Wild. (1914); Guarea glomerulata Harms (1896); Guarea glomerulata var. obanensis Baker f. (1913)

= Neoguarea =

Genus of flowering plants

Neoguarea glomerulata is a species of flowering plant in the family Meliaceae. It is a tree or shrub native to west-central tropical Africa, ranging from southern Nigeria through Cameroon, Equatorial Guinea, Gabon, Republic of the Congo, and Democratic Republic of the Congo. It is the sole species in genus Neoguarea. It grows in lowland Guineo-Congolian rainforest.

The species was originally named Guarea glomerulata by Hermann Harms in 1896. A morphological study published in 2012 found that the African species of Guarea are distinct from the Central and South American species, and G. glomerulata was reclassified Neoguarea glomerulata and placed in its own genus.
