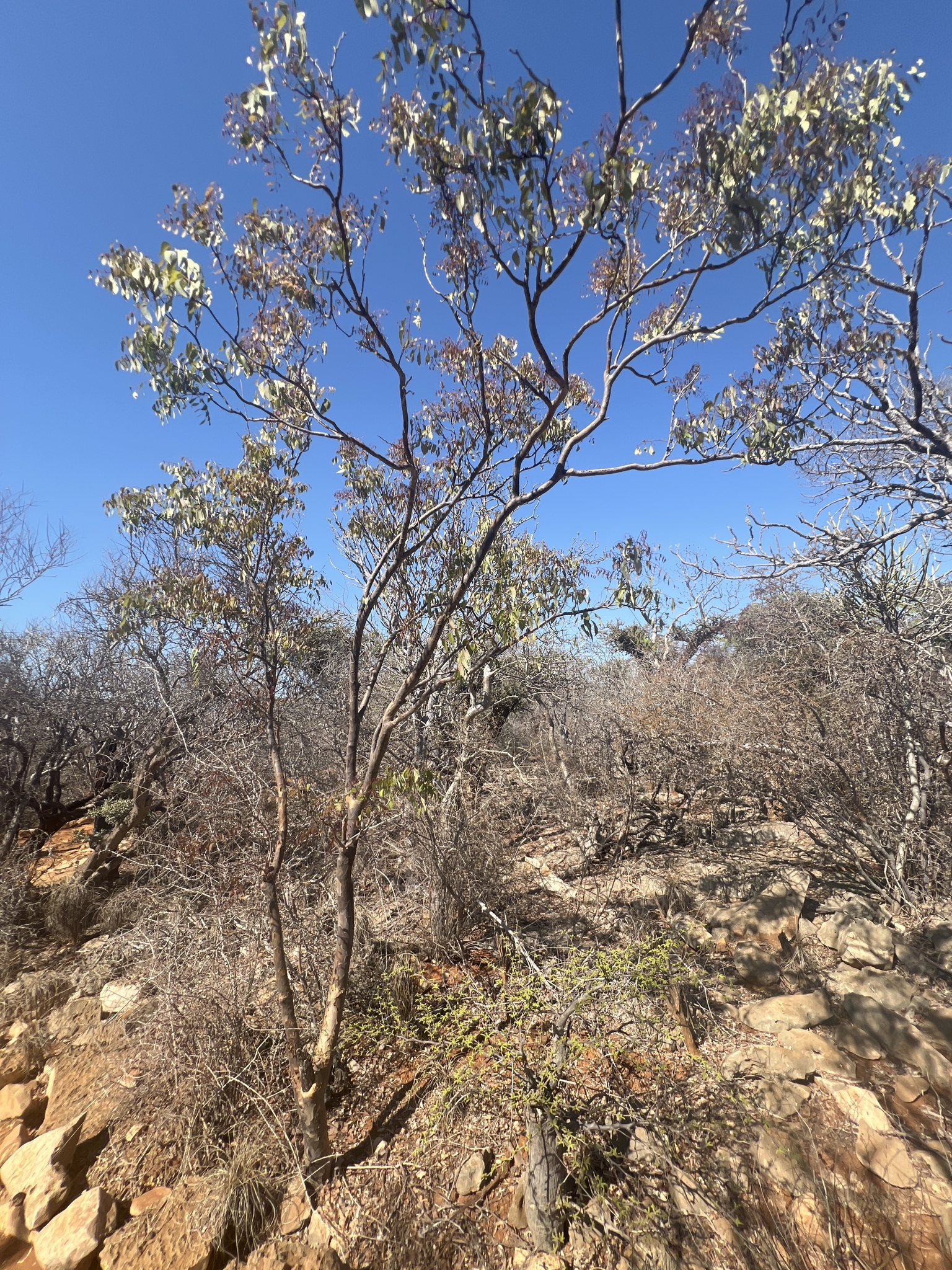
- Neobeguea mahafalensis

Scientific classification
- Kingdom: Plantae
- Clade: Tracheophytes
- Clade: Angiosperms
- Clade: Eudicots
- Clade: Rosids
- Order: Sapindales
- Family: Meliaceae
- Genus: Neobeguea; J.-F.Leroy

= Neobeguea =

Genus of plants

Neobeguea is a genus of flowering plants belonging to the family Meliaceae.

It is native to Madagascar.

The genus name of Neobeguea is in honour of Louis Henri Bégué (1906–1979), French civil servant in the forestry service in Madagascar. It was first described and published in J. Agric. Trop. Bot. Appl. Vol.17 on page 232 in 1970.

== Known species ==
According to Kew:

- Neobeguea ankaranensis J.-F.Leroy
- Neobeguea leandriana J.-F.Leroy
- Neobeguea mahafaliensis J.-F.Leroy
