= Calodecaryia =

Scientific classification
- Kingdom: Plantae
- Clade: Tracheophytes
- Clade: Angiosperms
- Clade: Eudicots
- Clade: Rosids
- Order: Sapindales
- Family: Meliaceae
- Genus: Calodecaryia; Leroy (1960)

Genus of flowering plants

Calodecaryia is a genus of flowering plants belonging to the family Meliaceae.

Its native range is Madagascar.

Species:

- Calodecaryia crassifolia Leroy
- Calodecaryia pauciflora Leroy
