= Lepidotrichilia =

Scientific classification
- Kingdom: Plantae
- Clade: Tracheophytes
- Clade: Angiosperms
- Clade: Eudicots
- Clade: Rosids
- Order: Sapindales
- Family: Meliaceae
- Genus: Lepidotrichilia (Harms) T.D.Penn. & Styles

Genus of plants

Lepidotrichilia is a genus of flowering plants belonging to the family Meliaceae.

Its native range is Ethiopia to Malawi, Madagascar.

Species:

- Lepidotrichilia ambrensis J.-F.Leroy
- Lepidotrichilia convallariiodora (Baill.) J.-F.Leroy
- Lepidotrichilia sambiranensis J.-F.Leroy
- Lepidotrichilia volkensii (Gürke) J.-F.Leroy
