= Quivisianthe =

Scientific classification
- Kingdom: Plantae
- Clade: Embryophytes
- Clade: Tracheophytes
- Clade: Angiosperms
- Clade: Eudicots
- Clade: Rosids
- Order: Sapindales
- Family: Meliaceae
- Subfamily: Melioideae
- Genus: Quivisianthe; Baill.
- Species: Q. papinae

Binomial name
- Quivisianthe papinae Baill.

Genus of flowering plants

Quivisianthe, known as valiandro, is a genus of flowering plants in the mahogany family, Meliaceae. It has only one currently accepted species, Quivisianthe papinae, native to Madagascar. Common canopy trees, they are an important food source for ring-tailed lemurs (Lemur catta) in the dry season.
