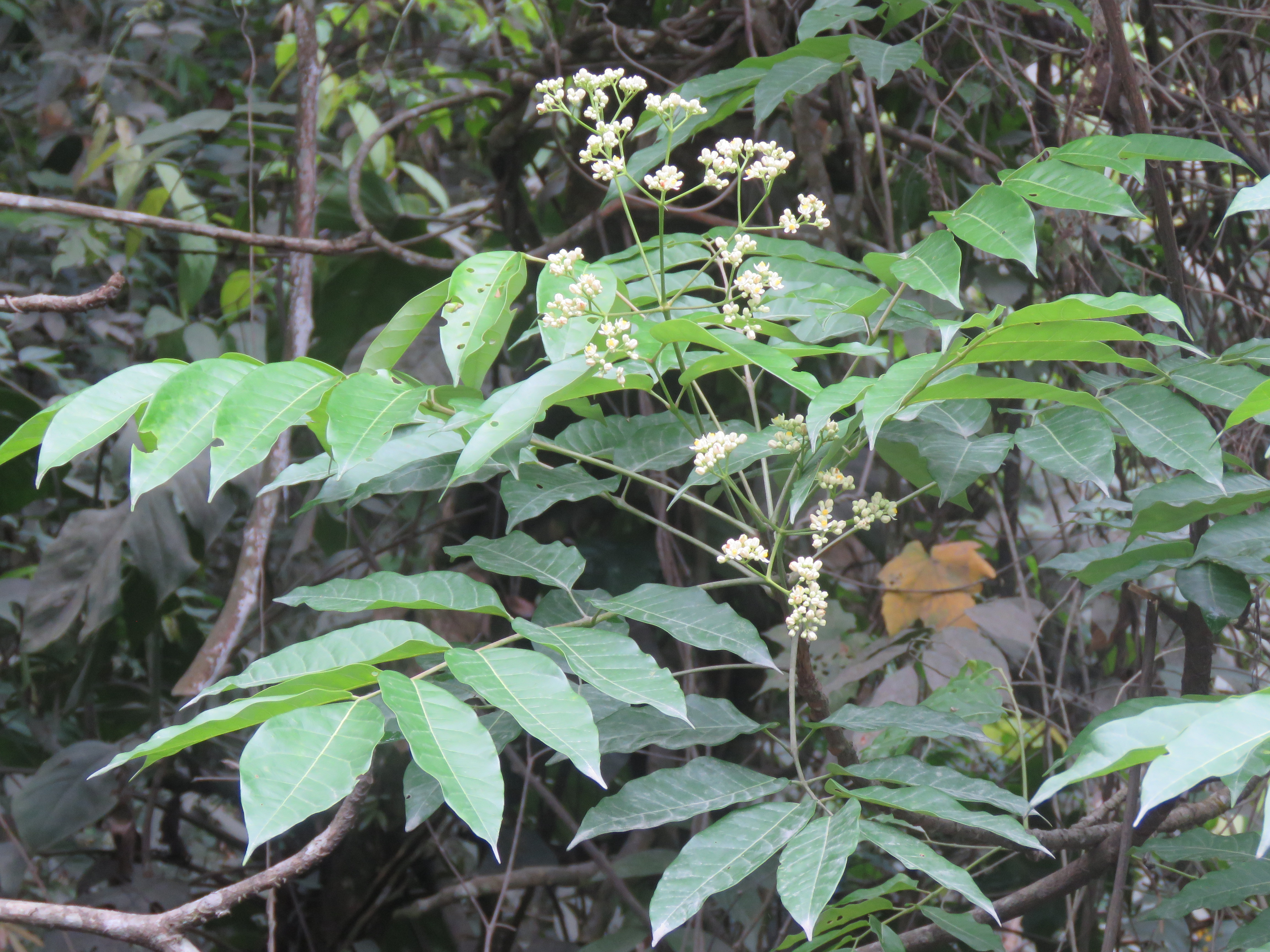
- Heynea trijuga

Scientific classification
- Kingdom: Plantae
- Clade: Tracheophytes
- Clade: Angiosperms
- Clade: Eudicots
- Clade: Rosids
- Order: Sapindales
- Family: Meliaceae
- Subfamily: Melioideae
- Genus: Heynea; Roxb.

Species
- See text

= Heynea =

Genus of trees

Heynea is a genus of trees in the family Meliaceae. Their range is in East and Southeast Asia.

== Description ==
The leaves are spirally arranged. Flowers feature four or five petals. Fruits are one or two-seeded.

== Species ==
As of March 2014 The Plant List recognises 2 accepted species:

- Heynea trijuga Roxb. ex Sims
- Heynea velutina F.C. How & T.C. Chen
