= Capuronianthus =

Scientific classification
- Kingdom: Plantae
- Clade: Tracheophytes
- Clade: Angiosperms
- Clade: Eudicots
- Clade: Rosids
- Order: Sapindales
- Family: Meliaceae
- Genus: Capuronianthus; J.-F.Leroy

Genus of flowering plants

Capuronianthus is a genus of flowering plants belonging to the family Meliaceae.

Its native range is Madagascar.

Species:

- Capuronianthus mahafalensis J.-F.Leroy
- Capuronianthus vohemarensis J.-F.Leroy
