= Sphaerosacme =

Scientific classification
- Kingdom: Plantae
- Clade: Tracheophytes
- Clade: Angiosperms
- Clade: Eudicots
- Clade: Rosids
- Order: Sapindales
- Family: Meliaceae
- Subfamily: Melioideae
- Genus: Sphaerosacme; Wall. ex M.J.Roemer
- Species: S. decandra

Binomial name
- Sphaerosacme decandra (Wall.) Pennington

Synonyms
- Sphaerosacme nepalensis Roem. Sphaerosacme fragrans Wall. ex Voigt; Lansium decandrum (Roxb.) Briquet; Aphanamixis decandra (Roxb.) Kosterm. Amoora decandra (Wall.) Hiern; Aglaia decandra Wall. Aglaia decandra Roxb.

Genus of trees

Sphaerosacme is a monotypic genus of plants in the family Meliaceae. The sole species is Sphaerosacme decandra, a dioecious tree with odd-pinnate leaves. No subspecies are listed in the Catalogue of Life. Its distribution includes: Nepal, North Andamans, Bhutan, India (West Bengal, Darjeeling, Sikkim) and Myanmar [Burma] (Kachin).
