= Anthocarapa =

- Flowers

Conservation status
- Least Concern (IUCN 3.1)

Scientific classification
- Kingdom: Plantae
- Clade: Tracheophytes
- Clade: Angiosperms
- Clade: Eudicots
- Clade: Rosids
- Order: Sapindales
- Family: Meliaceae
- Subfamily: Melioideae
- Genus: Anthocarapa; Pierre
- Species: A. nitidula

Binomial name
- Anthocarapa nitidula (Benth.) T.D.Penn. ex Mabb.

Synonyms
- Amoora nitidula Benth.; Pseudocarapa nitidula (Benth.) Merr. & L.M.Perry; Amoora balansana C.DC.; Amoora vieillardii C.DC.; Anthocarapa balansana (C.DC.) Pierre; Anthocarapa vieillardii (C.DC.) Pierre; Dysoxylum oubatchense Harms; Pseudocarapa nitidula var. latifolia Merr. & L.M.Perry

Genus of flowering plants

Anthocarapa is a genus of plants in the family Meliaceae. It is monotypic, meaning that it includes only one species, Anthocarapa nitidula, also known as incensewood. This is a rainforest tree with a natural range extending from the Philippines to the western Pacific, including eastern Australia. It was first described in 1863 and has a conservation status of least concern. The tree produces a useful timber.

== Description ==
Anthocarapa nitidula is a tree that can reach up to 30 m (98 ft) in height with a trunk up to 65 cm (26 in) diameter. The trunk may produce buttresses up to 1 m (3 ft 3 in) high. The compound leaves have four to six leaflets arranged in opposite pairs, each measuring up to 15 cm (5.9 in) long and 4.5 cm (1.8 in) wide. The leaflet blades taper into the petiole, making the division between the blade and petiole indistinct.

The inflorescence is a thyrse or panicle. The scented flowers have a green, five-lobed calyx about 3 mm (0.12 in) diameter, and five pale green to cream petals about 5 mm (0.20 in) long. There are ten stamens attached to the cup-shaped staminal tube, and the ovary has two or three locules, each with a single ovule. The fruit is a pyramid- or bell-shaped, two- or three-valved capsule. They are brown and somewhat woody, and contain up to three seeds which are wrapped in a red aril.

In 1975, botanist Terence Dale Pennington described the species as being dioecious, that is, having male and female flowers on separate plants. However more recent studies have shown that the plants can be monoecious (i.e. with male and female flowers) or male only, and since the male flowers fall quickly the plant gives the impression that it is dioecious.

== Distribution ==
It is native to the following regions as defined in the World Geographical Scheme for Recording Plant Distributions:

- Malesia – Lesser Sunda Islands, Philippines, Sulawesi
- Papuasia – New Guinea, Solomon Islands
- Australia – New South Wales, Queensland
- Southwestern Pacific – New Caledonia, Vanuatu

In Australia the species is found along the northeast coast in two widely disjunct populations. The northern group extends over 900 km (560 mi) of coastal Queensland, from the top of Cape York Peninsula to about Cardwell. The southern group stretches about half that distance, from near Gin Gin in southeast Queensland to the area around Lismore in northeast New South Wales. The two populations are about 950 km (590 mi) apart.

== Habitat ==
Incensewood grows in tropical and subtropical rainforest, monsoon forest and beach forest. In north Queensland it is found from sea level up to about 1,000 m (3,300 ft).

== Taxonomy ==
It was first described, as Amoora nitidula, in 1863 by botanist George Bentham, and transferred to the current combination Anthocarapa nitidula by Terence Dale Pennington in 1975.

== Conservation ==
This species was assessed by the International Union for Conservation of Nature (IUCN) in 2020 and found to be of least concern. It is also rated as least concern by the Queensland Government under its Nature Conservation Act. In its statement, the IUCN cites the lack of any perceived threat to the species, as well as a wide distribution and large population, as the basis for the assessment.

== Ecology ==
The fruits of this species are eaten by a variety of birds, including parrots, fruit doves, bowerbirds and honeyeaters.

== Uses ==
The tree produces a durable timber which is sold under the trade name 'incensewood'. It has a density of 800 kg/m^{3} (1,300 lb/cu yd).
