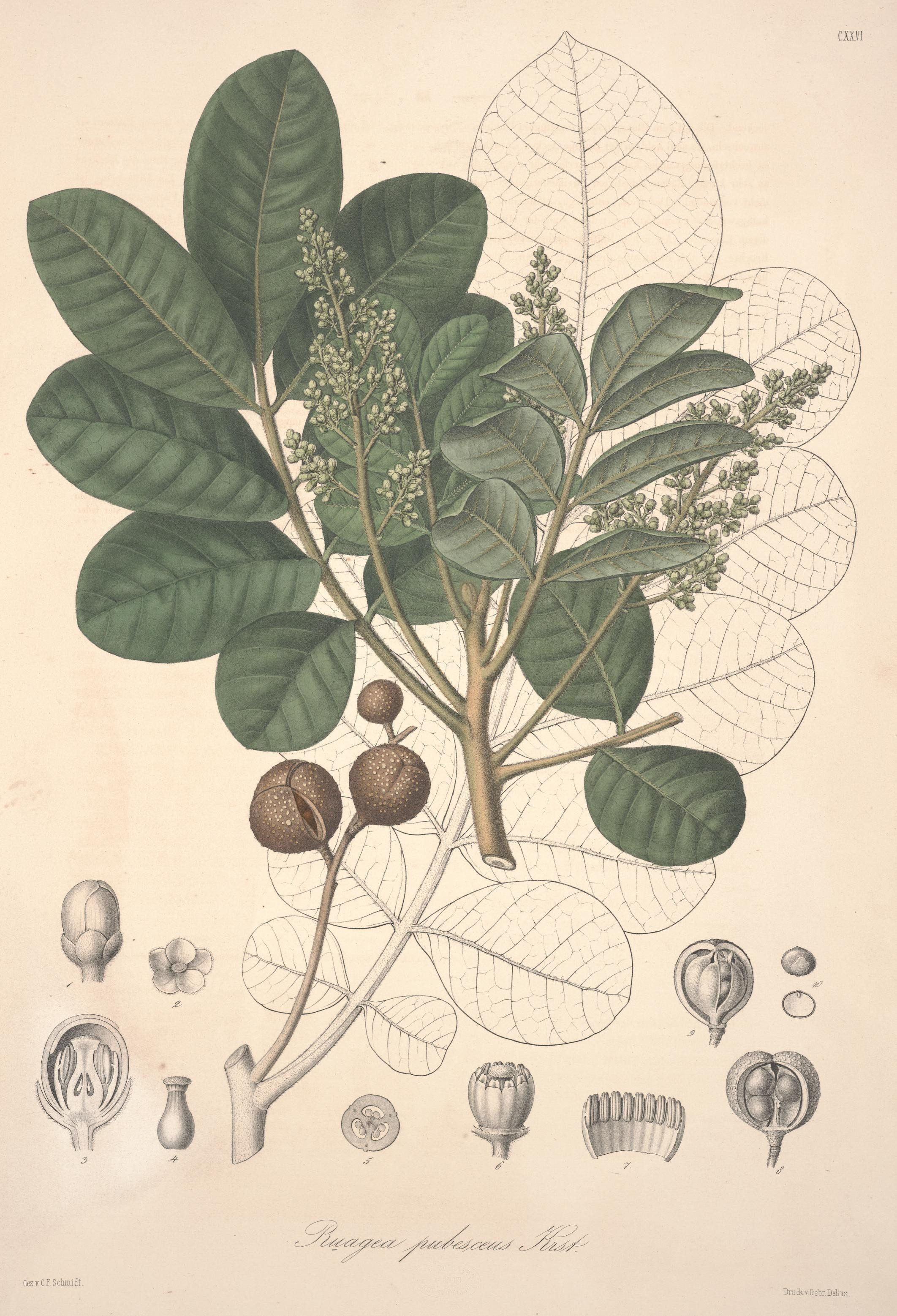

Scientific classification
- Kingdom: Plantae
- Clade: Tracheophytes
- Clade: Angiosperms
- Clade: Eudicots
- Clade: Rosids
- Order: Sapindales
- Family: Meliaceae
- Subfamily: Melioideae
- Genus: Ruagea; H.Karst.

Species
- See text

= Ruagea =

Genus of flowering plants

Ruagea is a genus of plants in the family Meliaceae. It includes nine species native to the tropical Americas, ranging from Guatemala to Venezuela and Bolivia. Most species are small or medium-sized trees native to montane rain forest and cloud forest in the Andes and Central American mountains, while Ruagea glabra and R. insignis also grow in lowland rain forests.

== Species ==
Nine species are accepted.

- Ruagea glabra Triana & Planch.
- Ruagea hirsuta (C.DC.) Harms
- Ruagea insignis (C.DC.) T.D.Penn.
- Ruagea membranacea W.Palacios
- Ruagea microphylla W.Palacios
- Ruagea ovalis (Rusby) Harms
- Ruagea pubescens H.Karst.
- Ruagea subviridiflora (C.DC.) Harms
- Ruagea tomentosa Cuatrec.
