= Pseudoclausena =

Scientific classification
- Kingdom: Plantae
- Clade: Tracheophytes
- Clade: Angiosperms
- Clade: Eudicots
- Clade: Rosids
- Order: Sapindales
- Family: Meliaceae
- Genus: Pseudoclausena; T.Clark
- Species: P. chrysogyne

Binomial name
- Pseudoclausena chrysogyne (Miq.) T.Clark

Genus of plants

Pseudoclausena is a monotypic genus of flowering plants belonging to the family Meliaceae. The only species is Pseudoclausena chrysogyne.

Its native range is Indo-China to New Guinea.
