= Pterorhachis =

Scientific classification
- Kingdom: Plantae
- Clade: Tracheophytes
- Clade: Angiosperms
- Clade: Eudicots
- Clade: Rosids
- Order: Sapindales
- Family: Meliaceae
- Genus: Pterorhachis; Harms

Genus of plants

Pterorhachis is a genus of flowering plants belonging to the family Meliaceae.

Its native range is Western Central Tropical Africa.

Species:

- Pterorhachis letestui Pellegr.
- Pterorhachis zenkeri Harms
