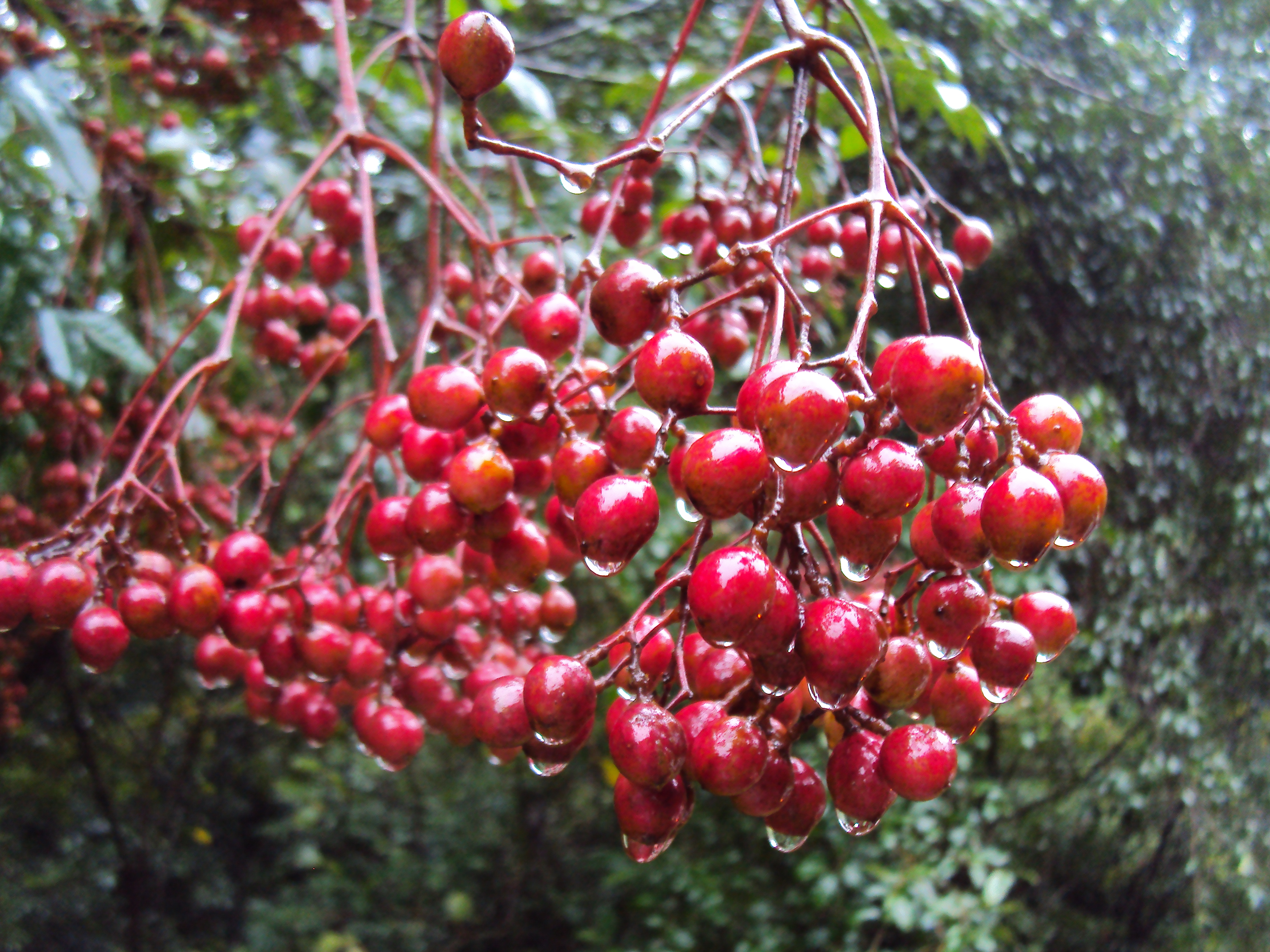

Conservation status
- Least Concern (IUCN 3.1)

Scientific classification
- Kingdom: Plantae
- Clade: Tracheophytes
- Clade: Angiosperms
- Clade: Eudicots
- Clade: Rosids
- Order: Sapindales
- Family: Meliaceae
- Genus: Heynea
- Species: H. trijuga

Binomial name
- Heynea trijuga (Wight & Am.) Bentv.

Synonyms
- Trichilia connaroides

= Heynea trijuga =

Species of tree

Heynea trijuga is a species of plant in the family Meliaceae. It is native to an area of tropical Asia from Nepal and India to Indonesia and the Philippines. It is threatened by habitat loss in Nepal.
