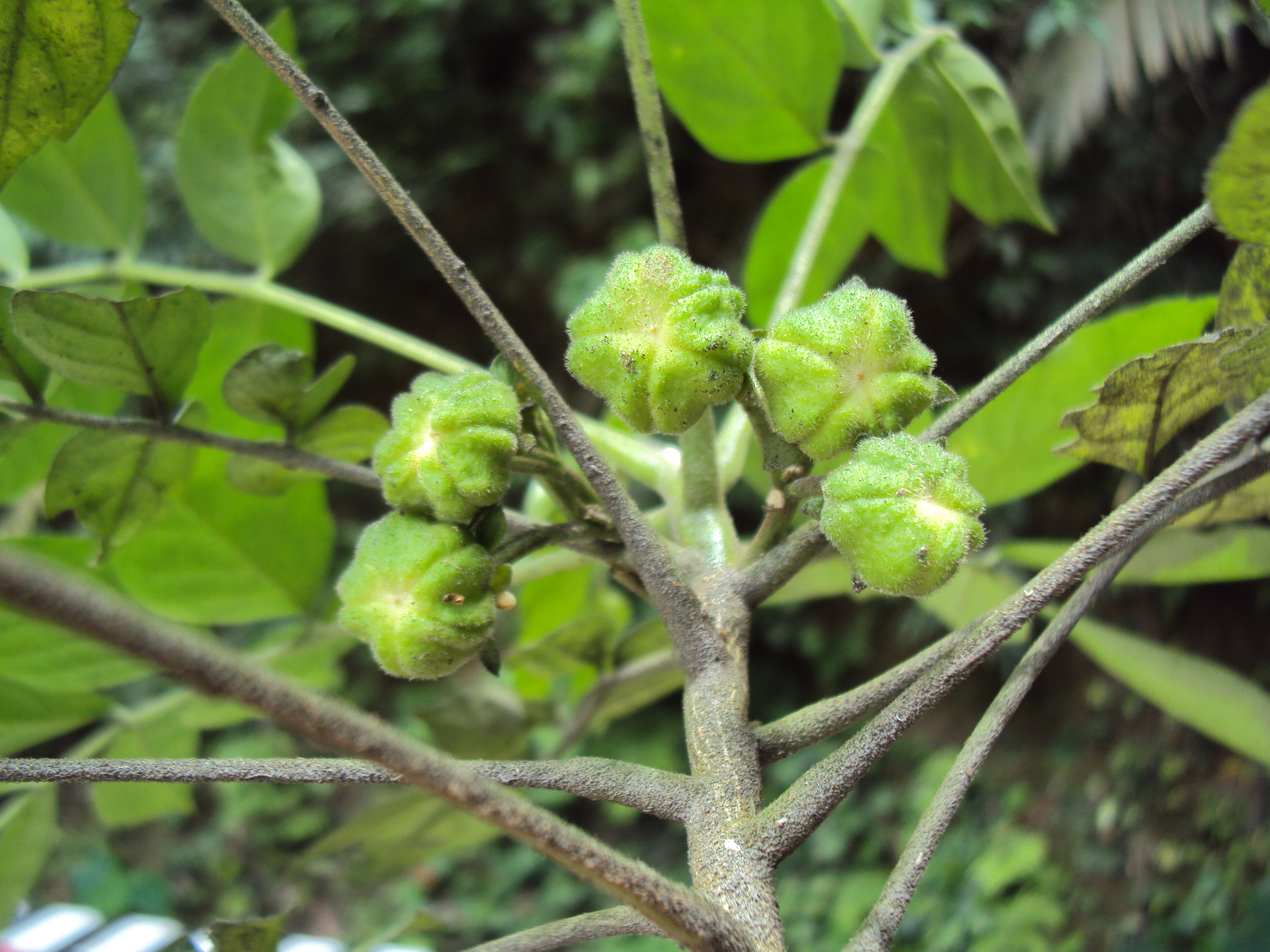
- Munronia pinnata

Scientific classification
- Kingdom: Plantae
- Clade: Embryophytes
- Clade: Tracheophytes
- Clade: Angiosperms
- Clade: Eudicots
- Clade: Rosids
- Order: Sapindales
- Family: Meliaceae
- Subfamily: Melioideae
- Genus: Munronia; Wight

Species
- Munronia breviflora (Ridl.) Mabb. & Muellner; Munronia humilis (Blanco) Harms; Munronia pauciflora (Pierre) Harms; Munronia petiolata N.T.Cuong, D.T.Hoan & Mabb.; Munronia pinnata (Wall.) W.Theob.; Munronia unifoliolata Oliv.; Munronia yinggelingensis R.J.Zhang, Y.S.Ye & F.W.Xing

Synonyms
- Philastrea Pierre

= Munronia =

Genus of flowering plants

Munronia is a genus of flowering plants in the family Meliaceae. Its native distribution is tropical and subtropical Asia.

The name Munronia is a taxonomic patronym honoring the English botanist William Munro (1818–1880), a plant collector in India, Kashmir, and Barbados. A taxonomic anagram derived from Munronia is Nurmonia, a confamilial genus synonym of Turraea.
