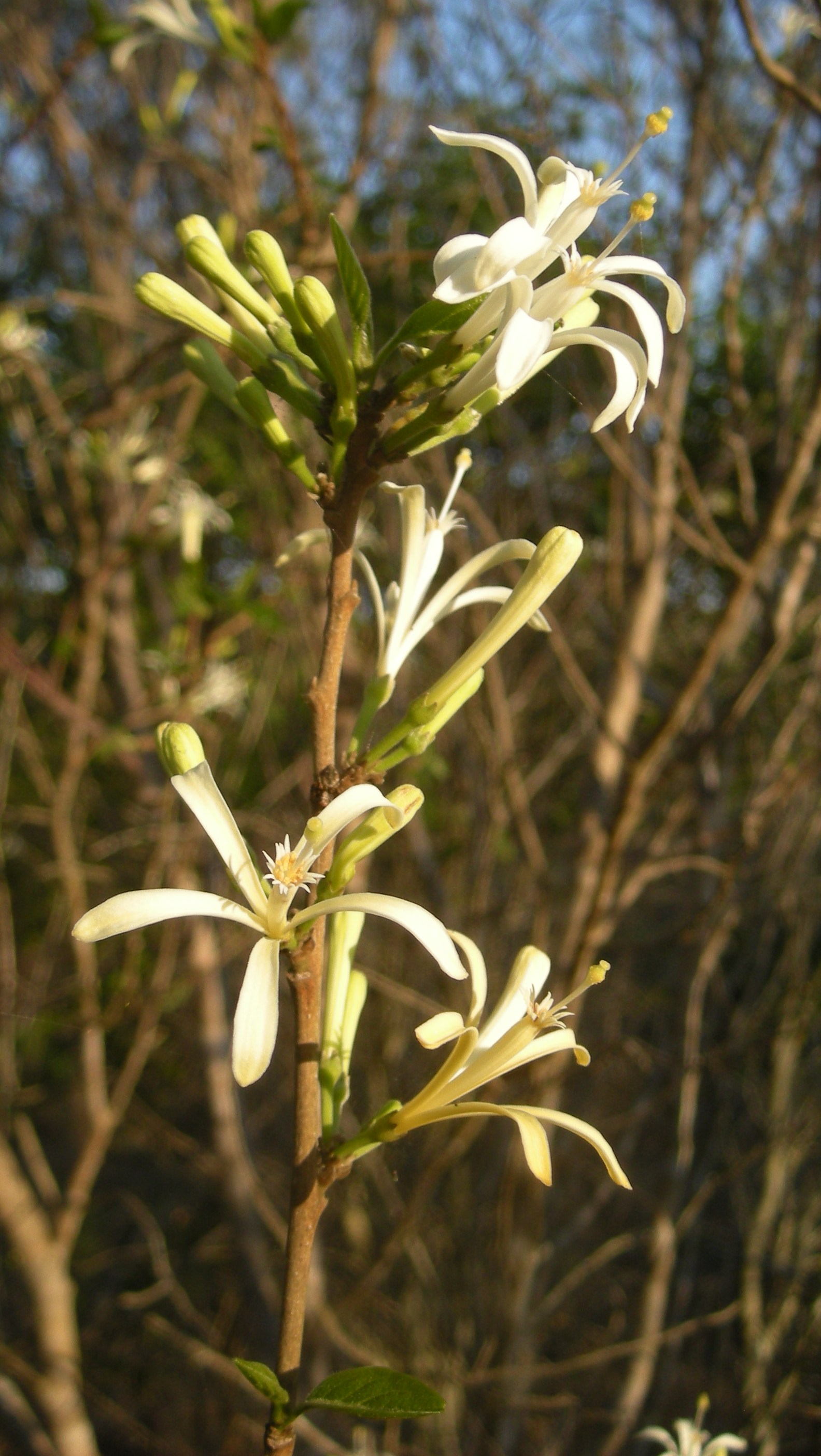
- Turraea pubescens

Scientific classification
- Kingdom: Plantae
- Clade: Tracheophytes
- Clade: Angiosperms
- Clade: Eudicots
- Clade: Rosids
- Order: Sapindales
- Family: Meliaceae
- Subfamily: Melioideae
- Genus: Turraea; L.

Species
- See here

Synonyms
- Calodryum Desv.; Gilibertia J.F.Gmel.; Ginnania M.Roem.; Grevellina Baill.; Nurmonia Harms (Note: One anagram of this genus name yields Munronia, another closely related genus of Meliaceae.); Payeria Baill.; Quivisia Comm. ex Juss.; Rutaea M.Roem.; Scyphostigma M.Roem.; Stephanosiphon Boivin ex C.DC.

= Turraea =

Genus of flowering plants

Turraea is a genus of plants in the family Meliaceae, native to the Old World tropics and subtropics.

== Taxonomy ==
It was described by Carl Linnaeus in 1771.

=== Species ===
It has 76 species:

- Turraea abyssinica Hochst.
- Turraea adjanohounii Aké Assi
- Turraea africana (Welw.) Cheek
- Turraea andriamiarisoana Callm., Phillipson & Lowry
- Turraea barbata Styles & F.White
- Turraea bardotiae Lescot & Callm.
- Turraea boivinii Baill.
- Turraea buerkii Callm., Phillipson & Lowry
- Turraea cabrae De Wild. & T.Durand
- Turraea cadetii A.J.Scott
- Turraea cauliflora J.-F.Leroy & Lescot ex Randr. & Callm.
- Turraea cornucopia Styles & F.White
- Turraea dargentiana Baider & V.Florens
- Turraea elephantina Styles & F.White
- Turraea fischeri Gürke
- Turraea flagellata J.-F.Leroy & Lescot ex Callm. & Nusb.
- Turraea floribunda Hochst.
- Turraea fockei Buchenau
- Turraea geayi Danguy
- Turraea ghanensis J.B.Hall
- Turraea glomeruliflora Harms
- Turraea gracilifolia Callm. & Nusb.
- Turraea heterophylla Sm.
- Turraea hildebrandtii O.Hoffm.
- Turraea holstii Gürke
- Turraea humbertii Danguy
- Turraea kimbozensis Cheek
- Turraea kindtii Buchenau
- Turraea kokwaroana Styles & F.White
- Turraea laciniata (Balf.f.) Harms
- Turraea lanceolata Cav.
- Turraea laurentii De Wild.
- Turraea leonensis Keay
- Turraea lescotiana Callm. & Nusb.
- Turraea longifolia C.DC.
- Turraea madagascarensis P.T.Li & X.M.Chen
- Turraea mombassana Hiern ex C.DC.
- Turraea monticola Bosser
- Turraea neoleroyana Callm. & Nusb.
- Turraea nilotica Kotschy & Peyr.
- Turraea obovata Gürke
- Turraea obtusifolia Hochst.
- Turraea oppositifolia (Cav.) Harms
- Turraea ovata (Cav.) Harms
- Turraea parvifolia Deflers
- Turraea pellegriniana Keay
- Turraea pervillei Baill.
- Turraea pubescens Hell.
- Turraea pulchella (Harms) T.D.Penn.
- Turraea rasolofoae Callm. & Nusb.
- Turraea retusa Styles & F.White
- Turraea rhombifolia Baker
- Turraea richardii Baill.
- Turraea rigida Vent.
- Turraea robusta Gürke
- Turraea rostrata C.DC.
- Turraea rutilans (Sm.) Bosser
- Turraea sambavensis J.-F.Leroy & Lescot ex Callm. & Nusb.
- Turraea sambiranensis Callm. & Nusb.
- Turraea sericea Sm.
- Turraea socotrana Styles & F.White
- Turraea stolzii Harms
- Turraea streyi F.White & Styles
- Turraea tetramera Benn.
- Turraea thouarsiana (Baill.) Cavaco & Keraudren
- Turraea thouvenotii Danguy
- Turraea trichopoda (Baill.) Harms
- Turraea tsingycola Callm. & Nusb.
- Turraea tugelensis N.R.Crouch & D.Styles
- Turraea venulosa Baker
- Turraea virens L.
- Turraea vogelii Hook.f.
- Turraea vogelioides Bagsh.
- Turraea vohisandrianensis Callm. & Nusb.
- Turraea wakefieldii Oliv.
- Turraea zambesica Sprague & Hutch.

== Distribution and habitat ==
The genus is native to the countries of Angola, Australia (Queensland and New South Wales), Benin, Botswana, Burundi, Cambodia, Cameroon, Central African Republic, China (southeast, Hainan), Comoros, Congo, Equatorial Guinea, Eritrea, Eswatini, Ethiopia, Gabon, Ghana, Gulf of Guinea Islands, Indonesia (Java, Lesser Sunda Islands and Western New Guinea), Ivory Coast, Kenya, Laos, Liberia, Madagascar, Malawi, Mauritius, Mozambique, Namibia (Caprivi Strip), Nigeria, Papua New Guinea, Philippines, Rwanda, Réunion, Saudi Arabia, Sierra Leone, Somalia, South Africa (Cape Provinces, KwaZulu-Natal and northern provinces), Sudan, Tanzania, Thailand, Togo, Uganda, Vietnam, Yemen, Zambia and Zimbabwe.
