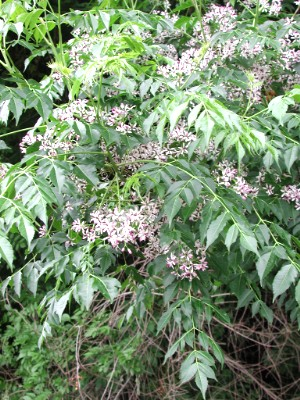
- Melia azedarach in flower

Scientific classification
- Kingdom: Plantae
- Clade: Embryophytes
- Clade: Tracheophytes
- Clade: Angiosperms
- Clade: Eudicots
- Clade: Rosids
- Order: Sapindales
- Family: Meliaceae; Juss.

Subfamilies
- Cedreloideae; Melioideae

= Meliaceae =

Meliaceae Temporal range: Campanian–Recent

Family of plants commonly known as the Mahogany family

Meliaceae, the mahogany family, is a flowering plant family of mostly trees and shrubs (and a few herbaceous plants, mangroves) in the order Sapindales.

They are characterised by alternate, usually pinnate leaves without stipules, and by syncarpous, apparently cryptically unisexual flowers borne in panicles, cymes, spikes or clusters. Most species are evergreen, but some are deciduous, either in the dry season or in winter.

The family includes about 53 genera and about 600 known species, with a pantropical distribution; one genus (Toona) extends north into temperate China and south into southeast Australia, another (Synoum) into southeast Australia, and another (Melia) nearly as far north. They most commonly grow as understory trees in rainforests, but are also found in mangroves and arid regions.

The fossil record of the family extends back into the Late Cretaceous.

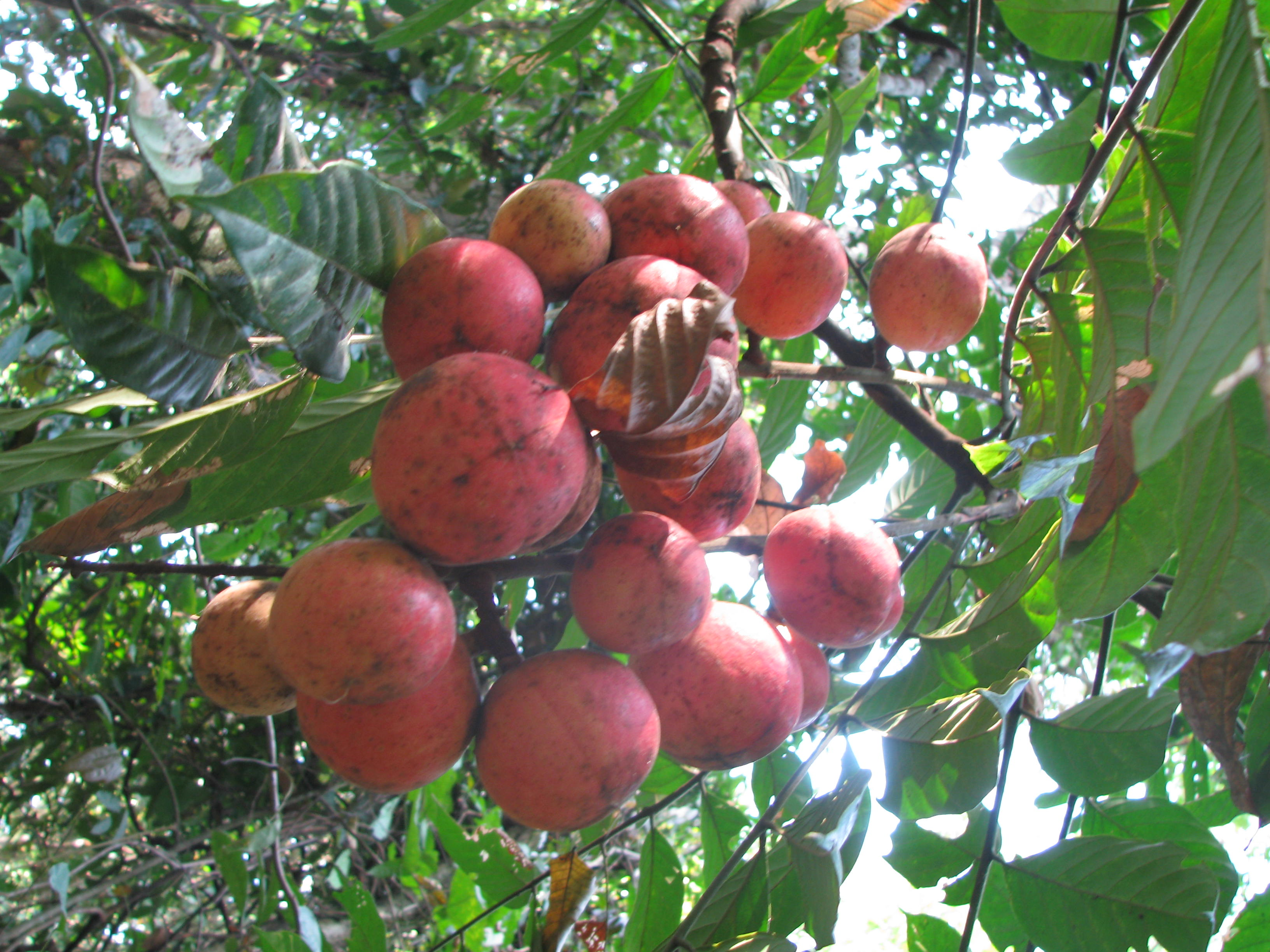
Fruits of Chisocheton cumingianus

== Uses ==
Various species are used for vegetable oil, soap-making, insecticides, and highly prized wood (mahogany).

Some economically important genera and species belong to this family:

- Azadirachta indica, neem tree (India)
- Carapa: includes the "crabwood trees" e.g. Carapa procera (South America and Africa)
- Cedrela odorata Central and South America; timber also known as Spanish-cedar
- Entandrophragma: includes sapele (Entandrophragma cylindricum), and "utile" or "sipo" (E. utile) of tropical Africa
- Guarea, the genus of Bossé or "pink mahogany", includes: G. thompsonii and G. cedrata (Africa)
- Khaya includes: Ivory Coast Mahogany and Senegal Mahogany (tropical Africa)
- Lansium domesticum, lanzones, grown for its edible fruit in Southeast Asia
- Melia azedarach, Chinaberry or white cedar (Indomalaya and Australasia)
- Sandoricum koetjape, santol, grown for its edible fruit in Southeast Asia and South Asia
- Swietenia is the classic "mahogany" genus from the tropical Americas
- Toona: the genus of "toon tree" species (tropical Asia, Malesia, and Australia), especially Toona ciliata

== Genera ==
58 genera are currently accepted.

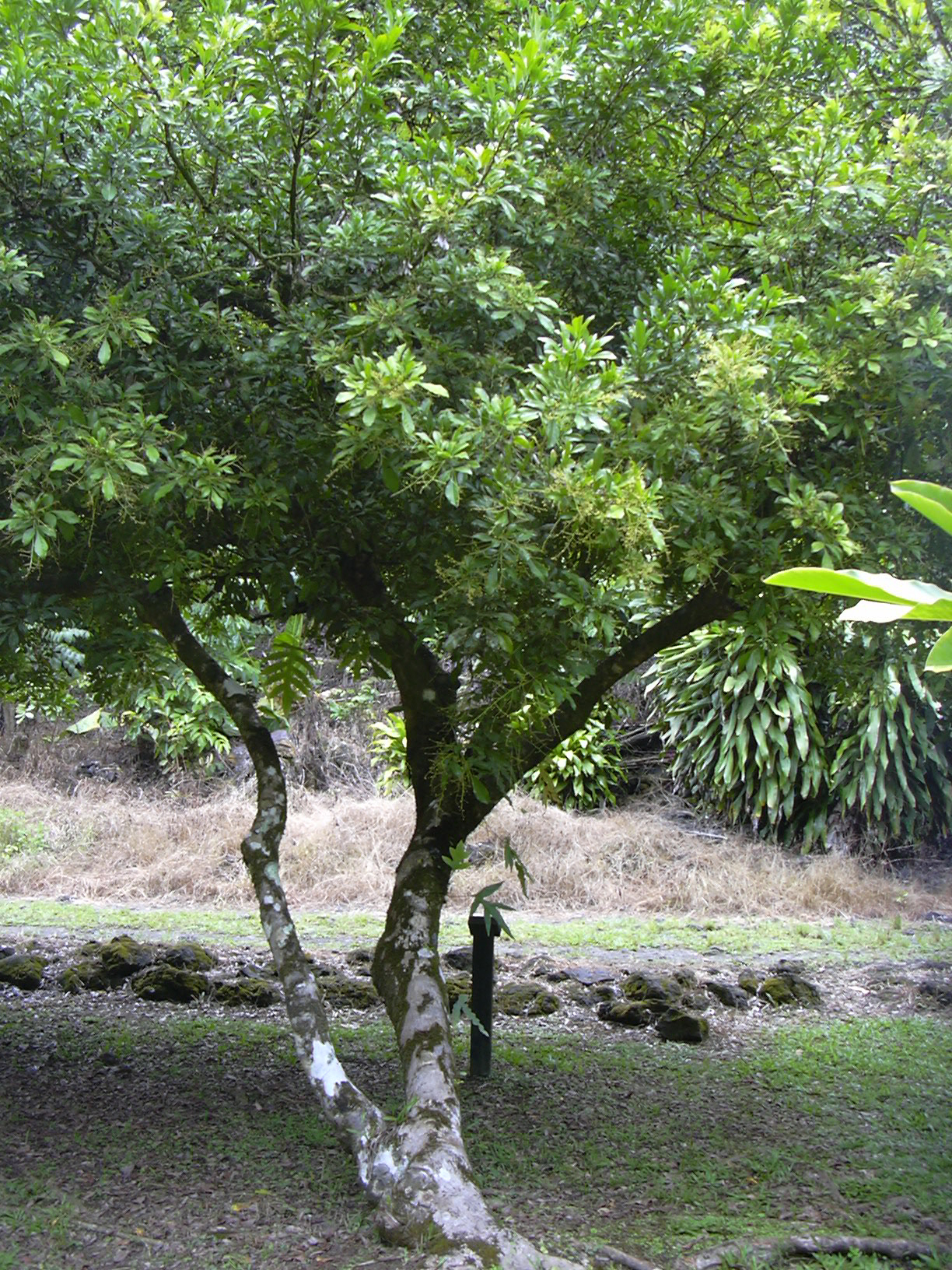
Chinese rice flower (Aglaia odorata)

The family is divided into two subfamilies, Cedreloideae and Melioideae, which are supported by phylogenetic evidence.

=== Subfamily Cedreloideae ===
This is also known as subfamily Swietenioideae.

tribe Cedreleae
- Cedrela P.Browne – Americas
- Toona M.Roem. - Asia

other tribes and genera:

- Capuronianthus J.-F.Leroy
- Carapa Aubl.
- Chukrasia A.Juss.
- Entandrophragma C.DC.
- Khaya A.Juss.
- Lovoa Harms
- Neobeguea J.-F.Leroy
- Pseudocedrela Harms
- Schmardaea H.Karst.
- Soymida A.Juss.
- Swietenia Jacq.
- Xylocarpus J.Koenig

=== Subfamily Melioideae ===
tribe: Aglaieae
- Aglaia Lour.
- Lansium Corrêa
- Reinwardtiodendron Koord.

- related genera:

- Chisocheton Blume
- Didymocheton Blume
- Dysoxylum Blume ex Raspail
- Epicharis Blume
- Goniocheton Blume
- Prasoxylon M.Roem.
- Pseudocarapa Hemsl.
- Sphaerosacme Wall. ex M.Roem.

tribe: Guareeae - Africa

- Guarea Allemão ex L.
- Heckeldora Pierre
- Leplaea Vermoesen
- Neoguarea (Harms) E.J.M.Koenen & J.J.de Wilde
- Ruagea H.Karst.
- Turraeanthus Baill.

tribe: Melieae

- Melia L.
- Azadirachta A.Juss.

tribe: Sandoriceae

- Sandoricum Cav.

tribe: Turraeeae

- Calodecaryia Leroy
- Humbertioturraea J.-F.Leroy
- Munronia Wight
- Naregamia Wight & Arn.
- Nymania Lindb.
- Turraea L.

- related genera:

- Anthocarapa Pierre

tribe: Trichilieae

- Astrotrichilia (Harms) T.D.Penn. & Styles
- Cipadessa Blume
- Ekebergia Sparrm.
- Heynea Roxb.
- Lepidotrichilia (Harms) T.D.Penn. & Styles
- Malleastrum (Baill.) J.-F.Leroy
- Owenia F.Muell.
- Pseudobersama Verdc.
- Pseudoclausena T.Clark
- Pterorhachis Harms
- Trichilia P.Browne
- Walsura Roxb.

- related genera:

- Quivisianthe Baill.

tribe: Vavaeeae

- Vavaea Benth.

tribe unassigned:

- Aphanamixis Blume
- Cabralea A.Juss.
- Synoum A.Juss.
