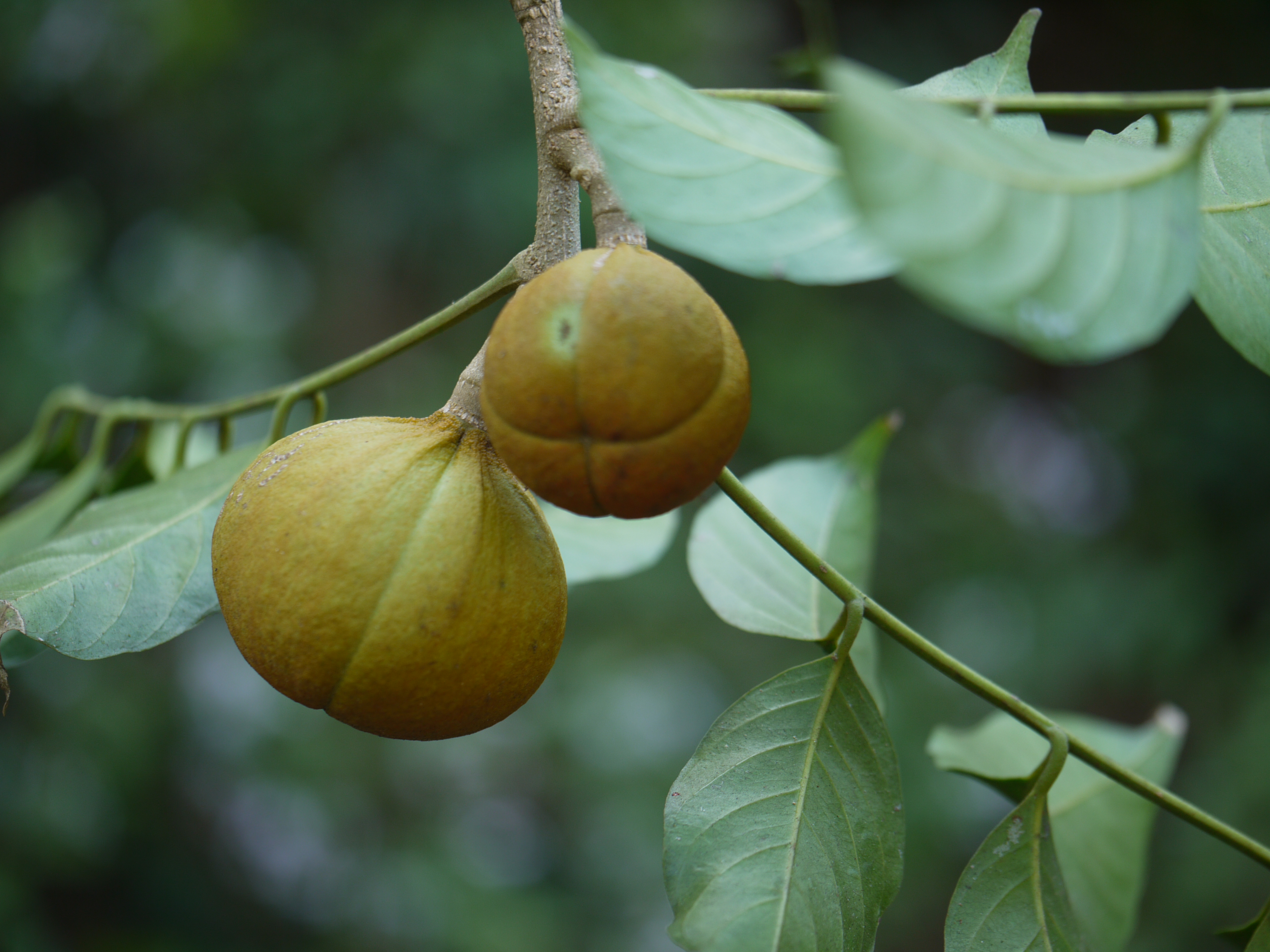
- Dysoxylum gotadhora fruits and leaves

Scientific classification
- Kingdom: Plantae
- Clade: Tracheophytes
- Clade: Angiosperms
- Clade: Eudicots
- Clade: Rosids
- Order: Sapindales
- Family: Meliaceae
- Subfamily: Melioideae
- Genus: Dysoxylum; Blume ex Raspail (1827)

Type species
- Dysoxylum macrocarpum (Spreng.) Blume ex G.Don

Species
- 34, see text

Synonyms
- List: Alliaria Rumph ex Kuntze (1891) (non Heist. ex Fabr.: nom. illeg., nom. superfl., preoccupied); Disoxylon Rchb. (1837), orth. var.; Disoxylum A.Juss. (1830 publ. 1831), orth. var.; Disyphonia Griff. (1854), nom. provis.; Dysoxylon Bartl. (1830), orth. var.); Harpagonia Noronha (1790), nom. nud.; Lachanodendron Reinw. (1823), nom. nud.; Plutea Noronha (1790), nom. nud.

= Dysoxylum =

Genus of flowering plants

Dysoxylum is a genus of rainforest trees and shrubs in the flowering plant family Meliaceae. About 34 species are recognised in the genus, distributed from India and southern China, through southeast Asia to New Guinea, the Solomon Islands, and Australia. The name Dysoxylum derives from the Greek word ‘Dys’ meaning "bad" referring to "ill-smelling" and ‘Xylon’ meaning "wood".

== Distribution ==
The genus ranges from the Indian subcontinent to Indochina, southern China, Malesia, New Guinea and the Solomon and Santa Cruz Islands, and northern and eastern Australia.

Eight species are native to the Indian subcontinent. 15 species are native to Indochina, and 6 are native to southern China. 13 species are native to Malesia, and seven species to Papuasia (New Guinea, the Bismarck Archipelago, and Solomon Islands) and the Santa Cruz Islands.

Four species – Dysoxylum acutangulum, D. latifolium, D. oppositifolium, and D. pumilum – are native to Australia. They grow in northwestern New South Wales, the humid east coast regions of Queensland including the wet tropics rainforests region of northeastern Queensland and Cape York Peninsula, and the northern parts of the Northern Territory and Western Australia.

In the Indian subcontinent, including India, Bhutan, Nepal, and Sri Lanka, large trees of the genus Dysoxylum grow naturally in forests from lowlands to mid-elevation mountains. Eight species are native to the region. D. beddomei, D. malabaricum, D. purpureum, and D. swaminathanianum are endemic to southwestern India. D. cyrtobotryum, D. gotadhora, D. grande, and D. pallens are native to the Indian subcontinent and southeast Asia.

== Habitats ==
These trees are important components of the native tropical forests of their range, such as New Guinea and the tropical forests of northern Australia. In this region, more than forty different species grow naturally, from the lowlands to the mountains. In New Guinea, D. enantiophyllum and an undescribed taxon have records of growing up to about 3,000 m (9,800 ft) elevation.

In the forests of the region of China, India, Sri Lanka and the adjacent Himalayas including Bhutan and Nepal, about fourteen recorded different species grow naturally from the lowlands to the mountains up to 1,700 m (5,600 ft) elevation.

In India, Dysoxylum malabaricum is known by many other names such as Indian white cedar, Bilidevdari (ಬಿಳಿದೇವದಾರು), Bombay white cedar, Velley agile, Porapa, Vella agil, and Devagarige (ದೇವರಿಗೆ). It grows in the evergreen forest regions of Western Ghats, North Kanara, Coorg, Anaimalai Hills, and Travancore regions.

== Uses ==
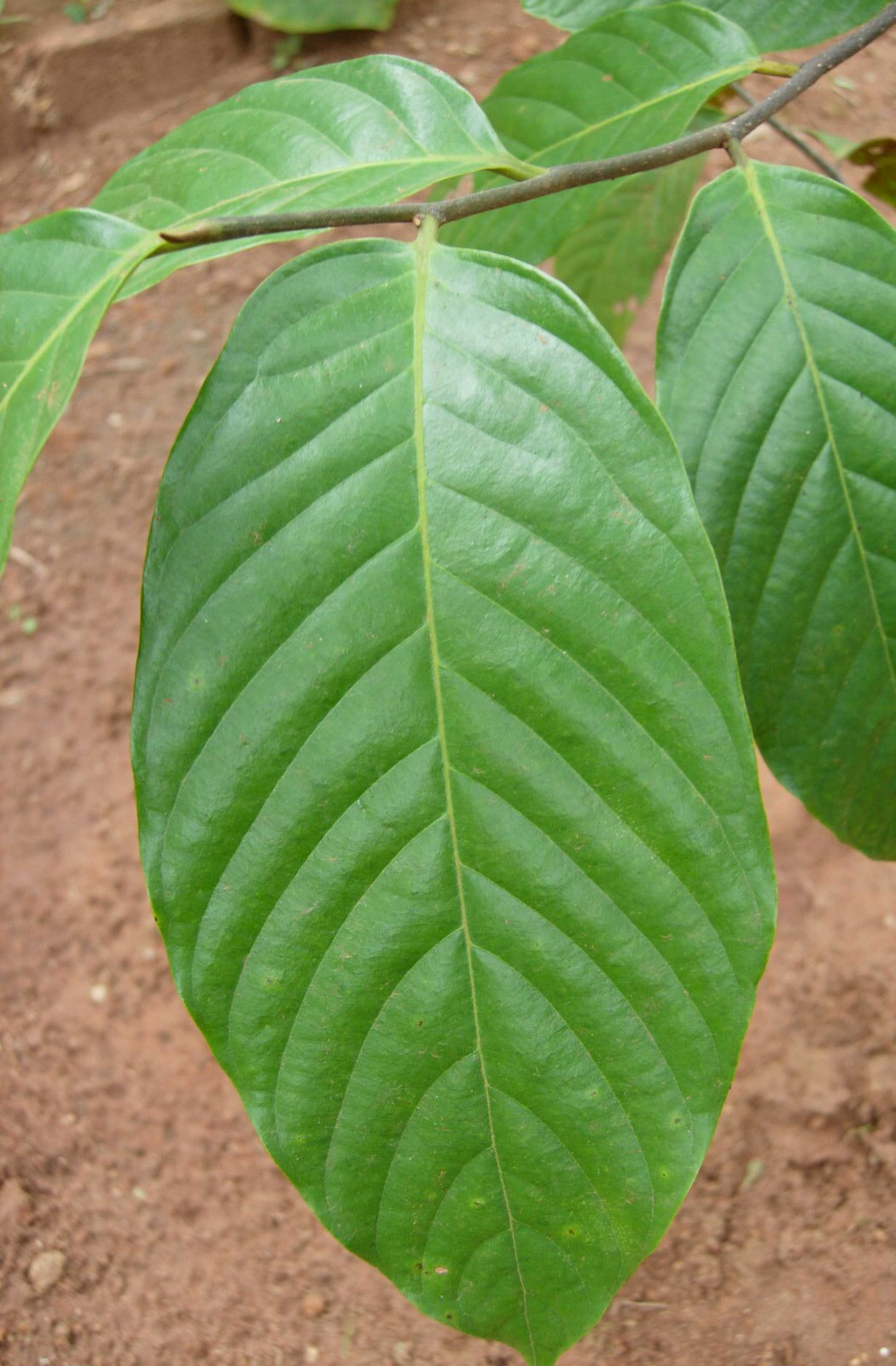
Dysoxylum gotadhora, 20 Dec 2007, India

The Australian species were prized for their wood which is a rich red in colour and was widely used in the furniture trade. The common timber name for the Australian species is the rose mahogany. The New Zealand species, kohekohe (D. spectabile), is sometimes known as New Zealand mahogany, because its wood is light, strong and polishes to a fine red colour.

Rohitukine (C16H19O5N), a chromane alkaloid, was first reported from Amoora rohituka (Roxb.) Wight & Arn. (Meliaceae) and then from D. binectariferum (aka D. gotadhora) Rohitukine exhibits both anti-inflammatory as well as immuno-modulatory properties besides acting as an anticancer compound. Rohitukine is an important precursor for the semi-synthetic derivative, flavopiridol (C21H20Cl NO5).

In India, apart from its economic importance for building and furniture making, it is an important ingredient in Ayurvedic Medicine as many species have curative qualities taken independently or as an ingredient of a medicinal mixture. Some of the uses in Ayurveda reported are; Wood decoction of D. malabaricum to cure rheumatism and its oil is used to cure eye and ear diseases; a few species are used to cure inflammation, cardio-disorder, CNS disorder and also tumor. In Indian tradition and culture oil is extracted from the seeds Dysoxylum malabaricum, which has wide beneficial application.

== Taxonomy ==
The genus Dysoxylum was erected in 1825 by the German-Dutch botanist Carl Ludwig Blume to accommodate some newly discovered plant species from Java. Over the years many changes were made to the genus, and by the late 20th century it was clear that Dysoxylum had become polyphyletic. A 2021 revision of the genus (which by then had come to include 94 species) confirmed the polyphyly and the authors reinstated several genera which had previously been considered synonyms of Dysoxylum – Didymocheton, Epicharis, Goniocheton, Prasoxylon, and Pseudocarapa – in order to accommodate their findings.

The authors (Holzmeyer et al.) proposed a circumscription (i.e. a concept of included species) of the genus that included 28 species, plus one subspecies. Following the publication of the 2021 paper, Plants of the World Online (POWO) revised their own circumscription of the genus to include 34 species. Of the 28 species proposed by Holzmeyer et al., only 23 are accepted by POWO, and there are 11 species included by POWO that were not proposed by Holzmeyer et al.

== Species ==
34 species are currently accepted by Plants of the World Online.

- Dysoxylum acutangulum Miq.
  - subsp. acutangulum – Peninsular Thailand, Malesia: Sumatra, Malay Peninsula, Borneo, Philippines
  - subsp. foveolatum (Radlk.) Mabb. – New Guinea, Solomon Is., Queensland, NT, N. Australia; Malesia: Sumatra, Java, Flores, Timor, Moluccas
- Dysoxylum beddomei Hiern – India
- Dysoxylum brachybotrys Merr. – Malesia: Borneo, Philippines
- Dysoxylum carolinae Mabb. – Vietnam; Malesia: Sumatra, Malay Peninsula, Borneo
- Dysoxylum cupuliforme H.L.Li – south-central China (Yunnan)
- Dysoxylum cyrtobotryum Miq. – SE Asia to Malesia: Nicobar Is., Andaman Is., Sumatra, Malay Peninsula, Borneo, Java, Bali, Flores, Philippines
- Dysoxylum enantiophyllum Harms – New Guinea
- Dysoxylum flavescens Hiern – Malesia: Sumatra, Malay Peninsula, Borneo
- Dysoxylum gotadhora (Buch.-Ham.) Mabb. – S. China, Hainan, Bhutan, India, Laos, Nepal, Thailand, Vietnam - Syn. Dysoxylum ficiforme (Wt.) Gamble – India
- Dysoxylum grande Hiern; Synonym: D. verruculosum – NE India (Assam), S. China, Vietnam, Thailand, Hainan, Bhutan; Malesia: Sumatra, Malay Peninsula, Borneo, Philippines
- Dysoxylum hoaense (Pierre) Pellegrin – Vietnam
- Dysoxylum juglans (Hance) Pellegrin – Laos, Vietnam
- Dysoxylum kaniense Harms – New Guinea, Solomon Is.
- Dysoxylum latifolium Benth. – New Guinea, Solomon Is., Queensland wet tropics, Cape York, NT, Western Australia
- Dysoxylum laxiracemosum C.Y.Wu & H.Li – south-central China (southern Yunnan)
- Dysoxylum macrocarpum Blume – Thailand; Malesia: Sumatra, Malay Peninsula, Borneo, Sulawesi, Java, Philippines
- Dysoxylum magnificum Mabb. – SE Sumatra, Borneo
- Dysoxylum malabaricum Bedd. ex C.DC. – Malayalam: Akil, India
- Dysoxylum medogense C.Y.Wu & H.Li – southeastern Tibet
- Dysoxylum middletonianum W.N.Takeuchi – eastern New Guinea
- Dysoxylum oliveri Brandis – northern Myanmar
- Dysoxylum oppositifolium F.Muell., pink mahogany – New Guinea, Solomon Is., Queensland wet tropics, Cape York, NT; Malesia incl.: Borneo, Philippines, Sumba, Flores
- Dysoxylum pachyrhache Merr. – Borneo
- Dysoxylum pallens Hiern in J.D.Hooker – S. China, Hainan, Bhutan, Cambodia, India, Burma, Thailand
- Dysoxylum papillosum King – Peninsular Thailand; Malesia: Malay Peninsula, Borneo
- Dysoxylum perryanum Pierre – Vietnam
- Dysoxylum poilanei Pellegr. – southern Vietnam
- Dysoxylum pumilum Mabb. – Queensland wet tropics endemic
- Dysoxylum purpureum Bourd. – southern India
- Dysoxylum quadrangulatum Culmsee – Sulawesi
- Dysoxylum randianum Merr. & L.M. Perry – New Guinea
- Dysoxylum rubrocostatum Pierre - Vietnam
- Dysoxylum rugulosum King – Malesia: Sumatra, Malay Peninsula, Borneo
- Dysoxylum swaminathanianum Anil Kumar & Sivad. – India (Kerala)

=== Formerly placed here ===
- Didymocheton aliquantulus A.C.Sm.) Holzmeyer & Hauenschild (as Dysoxylum aliquantulum A.C.Sm.)
- Didymocheton aneityensis (Guillaumin) Harms (as Dysoxylum aneityense Guillaumin)
- Didymocheton annae (Mabb.) Mabb. (as Dysoxylum annae Mabb.)
- Didymocheton bijugus (Labill.) Holzmeyer & Mabb. (as Dysoxylum bijugum (Labill.) Seem., D. leratianum Guillaumin, D. parvifolium C.DC., D. patersonianum (Endl.) F.Muell., and D. unijugum C.DC.)
- Didymocheton boridianus (Mabb.) Mabb. (as Dysoxylum boridianum Mabb.)
- Didymocheton canalensis (Baill.) Holzmeyer & Mabb. (as Dysoxylum canalense (Baill.) C.DC.)
- Didymocheton fraserianus (A.Juss.) Mabb. & Hauenschild (as Dysoxylum becklerianum C.DC., D. fraserianum (A.Juss.) Benth., D. lessertianum (A.Juss.) Benth., and D. ptychocarpum Radlk.)
- Didymocheton gaudichaudianus A.Juss. (as Dysoxylum albiflorum C.DC., D. amooroides Miq., D. bakerarum Guillaumin, D. betchei C.DC., D. blancoi Vidal, D. decandrum (Blanco) Merr., D. gaudichaudianum (A.Juss.) Miq., D. intermedium Merr. & L.M.Perry, D. macrophyllum Teijsm. & Binn., D. maota Reinecke, D. otophorum Miq., D. pubescens Teijsm. & Binn., D. quaifei C.DC., D. rufum var. glabrescens Benth., D. salutare Fern.-Vill., D. spanoghei Miq., and D. vestitum Warb.)
- Didymocheton hornei (Gillespie) Harms (as Dysoxylum hornei Gillespie)
- Didymocheton huntii (Merr. ex Setch.) Harms (as Dysoxylum huntii Merr. ex Setch.)
- Didymocheton kouiriensis (Virot) Mabb. (as Dysoxylum kouiriense Virot)
- Didymocheton lenticellaris (Gillespie) Harms (as Dysoxylum lenticellare Gillespie)
- Didymocheton loureiroi (Pierre) Harms (as Dysoxylum loureiroi (Pierre) Pierre ex Laness.)
- Didymocheton macranthus (C.DC.) Harms (as Dysoxylum macranthum C.DC.)
- Didymocheton macrostachyus (C.DC.) Mabb. (as Dysoxylum macrostachyum C.DC.)
- Didymocheton minutiflorus (Baill.) Holzmeyer & Mabb. (as Dysoxylum minutiflorum C.DC.)
- Didymocheton mollis (Miq.) Holzmeyer & Hauenschild (as Dysoxylum molle Miq., D. mollissimum subsp. molle (Miq.) Mabb., and Dysoxylum velutinum Koord.)
- Didymocheton mollissimus (Spreng.) Mabb. (as D. alliarum (Buch.-Ham.) N.P.Balakr., D. filicifolium H.L.Li, D. floribundum Merr., D. hainanense Merr., D. hainanense var. glaberrimum F.C.How & T.C.Chen, D. hamiltonii Hiern in J.D.Hooker, D. leptorrhachis Harms, D. mollissimum (Spreng.) Blume ex G.Don, D. octandrum (Blanco) Merr., D. schizochitoides (Turcz.) C.DC., and D. teysmannii C.DC.)
- Didymocheton muelleri (Benth.) Mabb. (as Dysoxylum muelleri Benth.)
- Didymocheton multijugus (Seem.) Harms (as Dysoxylum seemannii Gillespie)
- Didymocheton myriandrus (A.C.Sm.) Holzmeyer & Hauenschild (as Dysoxylum myriandrum A.C.Sm.)
- Didymocheton nutans Blume (as Dysoxylum nutans (Blume) Miq.)
- Didymocheton pachyphyllus (Hemsl.) Mabb. & Holzmeyer (as Dysoxylum pachyphyllum Hemsl.)
- Didymocheton pachypodus (Baill.) Harms (as Dysoxylum pachypodum (Baill.) C.DC.)
- Didymocheton papuanus (Merr. & L.M.Perry) Mabb. (as Dysoxylum micranthum Merr. & L.M.Perry and D. papuanum (Merr. & L.M.Perry) Mabb.)
- Didymocheton pauciflorus (Merr.) Mabb. (as Dysoxylum biflorum Merr., D. laxum Merr., and D. pauciflorum Merr.)
- Didymocheton pettigrewianus (F.M.Bailey) Hauenschild & Holzmeyer (as Dysoxylum pettigrewianum F.M.Bailey)
- Didymocheton phaeotrichus (Harms) Mabb. (as Dysoxylum phaeotrichum Harms)
- Didymocheton roseus (Baill.) Holzmeyer & Mabb. (as Dysoxylum comptonii Baker f., D. coriaceum Guillaumin, D. couveleense Guillaumin, D. francii C.DC. ex Bonati, D. gamosepalum Baker f., D. pancheri (Baill.) C.DC., D. pancheri var. subsessilifolium C.DC., D. robertsii C.DC. D. roseum C.DC., and Dysoxylum vieillardii C.DC.)
- Didymocheton rufescens (Vieill. ex Pancher & Sebert) Harms (as Dysoxylum rufescens Vieill. ex Pancher & Sebert)
- Didymocheton rufus (A.Rich.) Harms (as Dysoxylum rufum (A.Rich.) Benth.)
- Didymocheton sessilis (Miq.) Kosterm. (as Dysoxylum sessile Miq.)
- Didymocheton setosus (Span.) Mabb. & Holzmeyer (as Dysoxylum setosum (Span.) Miq.)
- Didymocheton sparsiflorus (Mabb.) Mabb.) (as Dysoxylum sparsiflorum Mabb.)
- Didymocheton spectabilis (G.Forst.) Mabb. & Holzmeyer – kohekohe (syn. Dysoxylum spectabile (G.Forst.) Hook.f.)
- Didymocheton stellatopuberulus (C.DC.) Harms (as Dysoxylum carrii Harms, D. hirtum Ridl., and D. stellatopuberulum C.DC.)
- Didymocheton tenuiflorus (A.C.Sm.) Holzmeyer & Hauenschild (as Dysoxylum tenuiflorum A.C.Sm.)
- Didymocheton tongensis (A.C.Sm.) Holzmeyer & Hauenschild (as Dysoxylum tongense A.C.Sm.)
- Didymocheton variabilis (Harms) Holzmeyer & Mabb. (as Dysoxylum variabile Harms)
- Epicharis alata (Harms) Harms (as Dysoxylum alatum Harms)
- Epicharis brevipanicula (C.DC.) Hauenschild & Mabb. (as Dysoxylum brevipaniculum C.DC.)
- Epicharis cumingiana (C.DC.) Harms (as Dysoxylum cumingianum C.DC.)
- Epicharis cuneata (Hiern) Harms (as Dysoxylum angustifoliolum Merr., D. beccarianum C.DC., D. cauliflorum Hiern, D. cuneatum Hiern, D. foxworthyi Elmer)
- Epicharis densiflora – Bali floral emblem, known as majegau (as Dysoxylum densiflorum (Blume) Miq.)
- Epicharis gillespieana (A.C.Sm.) Holzmeyer & Hauenschild (as Dysoxylum gillespieanum A.C.Sm.)
- Epicharis parasitica (Osbeck) Mabb. (as Dysoxylum brachypodum Baker f., D. callianthum Merr. & L.M.Perry, D. caulostachyum Miq., D. densevestitum C.T.White & W.D.Francis, D. fissum C.T.White & W.D.Francis ex Lane-Poole, D. fragrans Elmer, D. glochidioides Elmer ex Merr., D. leytense Merr., D. loheri Merr., D. longicalicinum C.DC., D. longiflorum Merr., D. longipetalum C.DC., D. megalanthum Hemsl., D. novoguineeuse Warb., D. parasiticum (Osbeck) Kosterm., D. ramiflorum Miq., D. richardsonianum Merr. & L.M.Perry, D. robinsonii Merr., D. roemeri C.DC., D. rumphii Merr., D. schiffneri F.Muell., D. sericeum (Blume) Adelb., and D. speciosum (A.Juss.) Miq.)
- Goniocheton arborescens Blume (as Dysoxylum arborescens (Blume) Miq.)
- Goniocheton brassii (Merr. & L.M.Perry) Hauenschild & Holzmeyer (as Dysoxylum brassii Merr. & L.M.Perry)
- Goniocheton lenticellatus (C.Y.Wu) Mabb. (as Dysoxylum lenticellatum C.Y.Wu)
- Prasoxylon alliaceum (Blume) M.Roem. (as Dysoxylum alliaceum (Blume) Blume ex A.Juss.)
- Prasoxylon angustifolium (King) Mabb. (as Dysoxylum angustifolium King)
- Prasoxylon excelsum (Spreng.) Mabb. (as Dysoxylum excelsum (Spreng.) Blume ex G.Don)
- Prasoxylon hapalanthum (Harms) Holzmeyer & Mabb. (as Dysoxylum hapalanthum Harms)
- Prasoxylon hongkongense (Tutcher) Mabb. (Dysoxylum hongkongense (Tutcher) Merr.)
- Prasoxylon klanderi (F.Muell.) Mabb. & Holzmeyer (as Dysoxylum klanderi F.Muell.)
- Prasoxylon rigidum (Ridl.) Mabb. (as Dysoxylum rigidum (Ridely) Mabb.)
- Pseudocarapa championii (Hook.f. & Thomson ex Thwaites) Hemsl. (as Dysoxylum championii Hook. f. & Thomson ex Thwaites)
- Pseudocarapa crassa (Mabb.) Mabb. (as Dysoxylum crassum Mabb.)
- Pseudocarapa dumosa (King) Holzmeyer & Mabb. (as Dysoxylum dumosum King)
- Pseudocarapa inopinata Harms (as Dysoxylum inopinatum (Harms) Mabb.)
- Pseudocarapa yunzaingensis (Merr. & L.M.Perry) Mabb. (as Dysoxylum yunzaingense Merr. & L.M. Perry)
