= D. flavescens =

D. flavescens may refer to:

- Dactylorhiza flavescens, a marsh orchid
- Dalea flavescens, a prairie clover
- Danthonia flavescens, an oatgrass eaten by takahē
- Darapsa flavescens, a Northern American moth
- Dasytes flavescens, a soft-wing flower beetle
- Dendroica flavescens, a bird endemic to the Bahamas
- Dichodontium flavescens, a dioicous moss
- Diodia flavescens, a flowering plant
- Diplomitoporus flavescens, a bracket fungus
- Diuris flavescens, a herbaceous plant
- Dorymyrmex flavescens, a cone ant
- Drilus flavescens, a click beetle
- Drosera flavescens, a carnivorous plant
- Dunbaria flavescens, a flowering plant
- Dysoxylum flavescens, a Malesian plant
