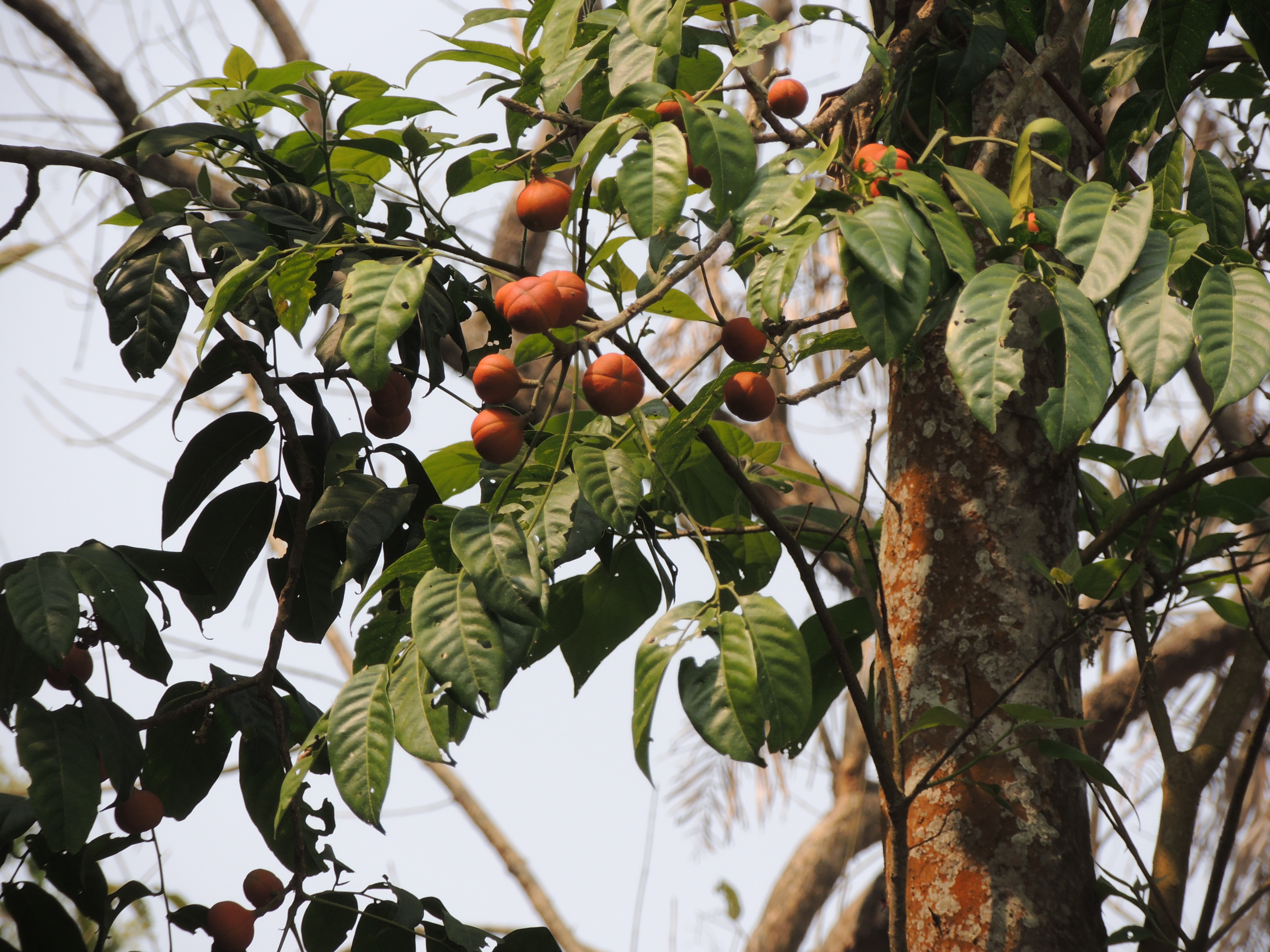

Scientific classification
- Kingdom: Plantae
- Clade: Tracheophytes
- Clade: Angiosperms
- Clade: Eudicots
- Clade: Rosids
- Order: Sapindales
- Family: Meliaceae
- Genus: Dysoxylum
- Species: D. gotadhora

Binomial name
- Dysoxylum gotadhora (Buch.-Ham.) Mabb.

Synonyms
- Alliaria golodhara Kuntze; Amoora ficiformis Wight; Dysoxylum binectariferum (Roxb.) Hook.f. ex Bedd.; Dysoxylum binectariferum var. coriaceum C.DC.; Dysoxylum binectariferum var. punctulatum C.DC.; Dysoxylum binectariferum var. pyyriforme Thwaites ex Trimen; Dysoxylum binectarifolium C.DC.; Dysoxylum ficiforme (Wight) Gamble; Dysoxylum grandifolium H.L.Li [Illegitimate]; Dysoxylum reticulatum King; Epicharis gotadhora M.Roem.; Guarea amaris Buch.-Ham.; Guarea binectarifera Roxb.; Guarea gotadhora Buch.-Ham.

= Dysoxylum gotadhora =

Species of tree

Dysoxylum gotadhora is a species of tree in the family Meliaceae. It is native to Bhutan, India, Laos, Nepal, Thailand, and Vietnam. The name Dysoxylum ficiforme (Wight) Gamble in India and Sri Lanka is categorized as the same plant as is D. binectariferum.

== Description ==
The tree grows up to 20 metres (70 ft) tall. The heartwood is a reddish color. The leaves are compound, imparipinnate; apex acuminate; base asymmetric-attenuate with entire margin. The flowers are white-colored and show axillary panicles inflorescence. The fruit is a four-seeded obovoid capsule and becomes red when ripened. The seeds are dark purple with white aril.

== Distribution ==
The species occurs in southwest India, Sri Lanka, Central Himalaya to China (S. Yunnan) and Indo-China.

== Gallery ==
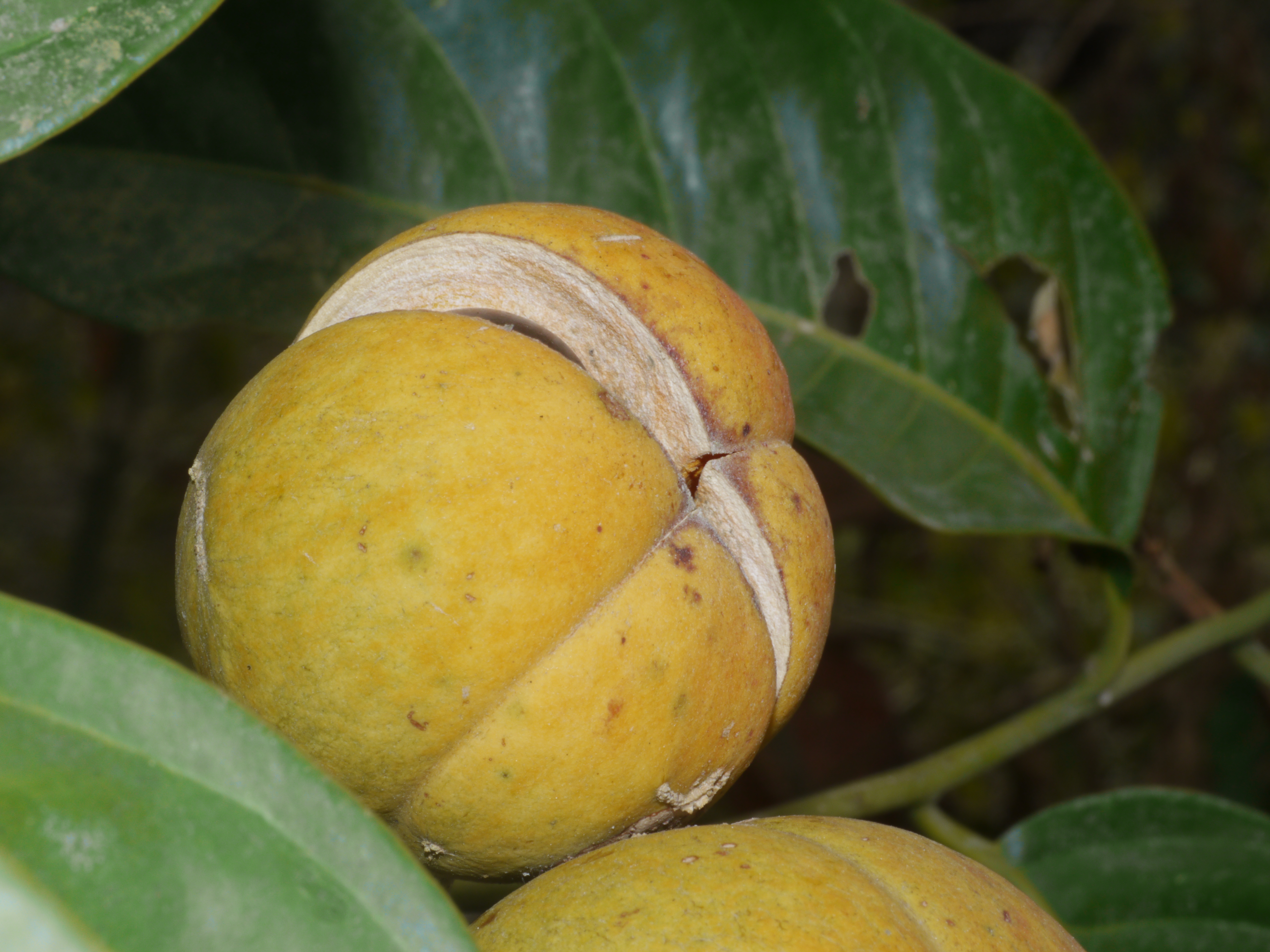
Fruit

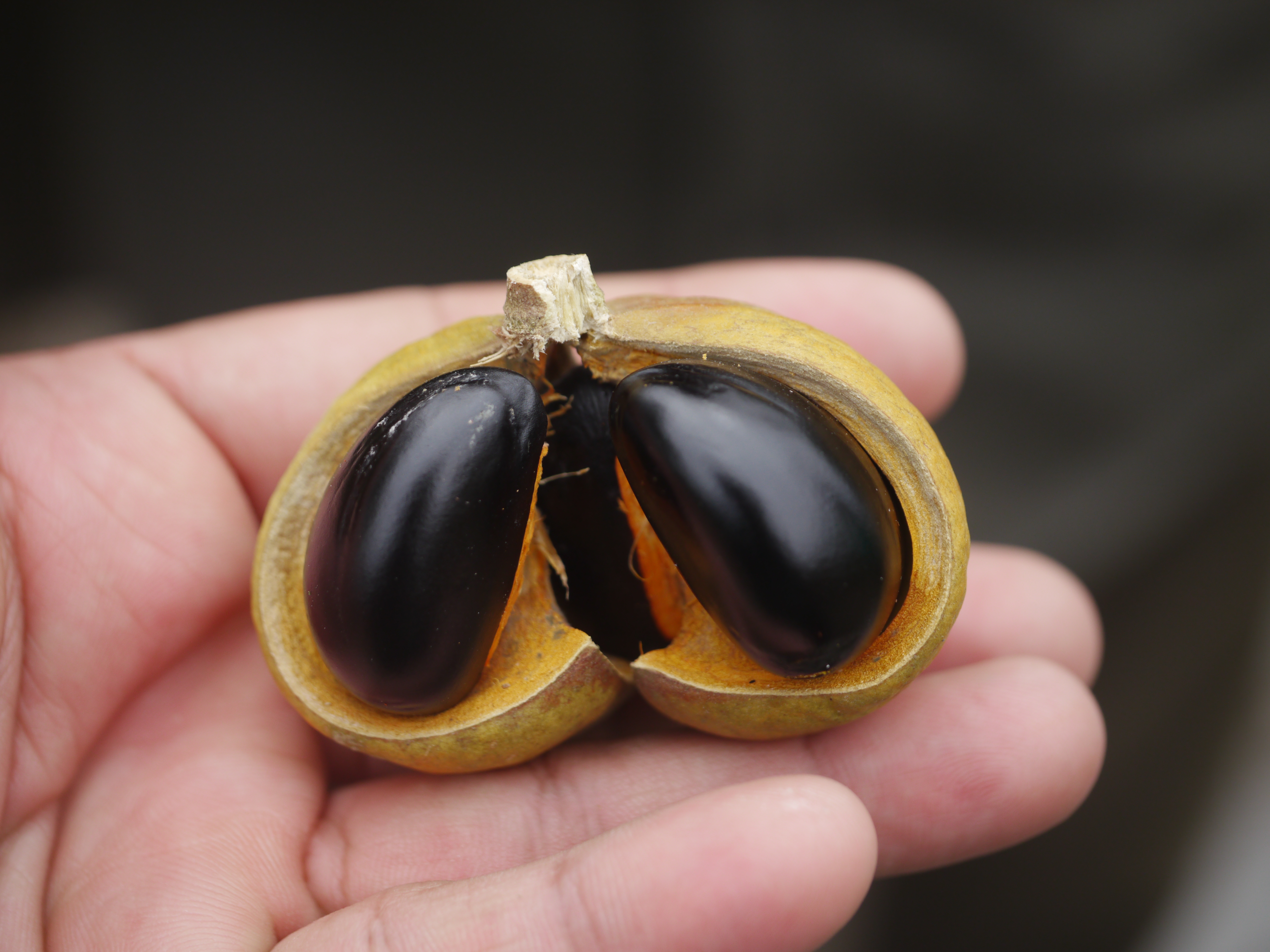
Fruit showing seeds

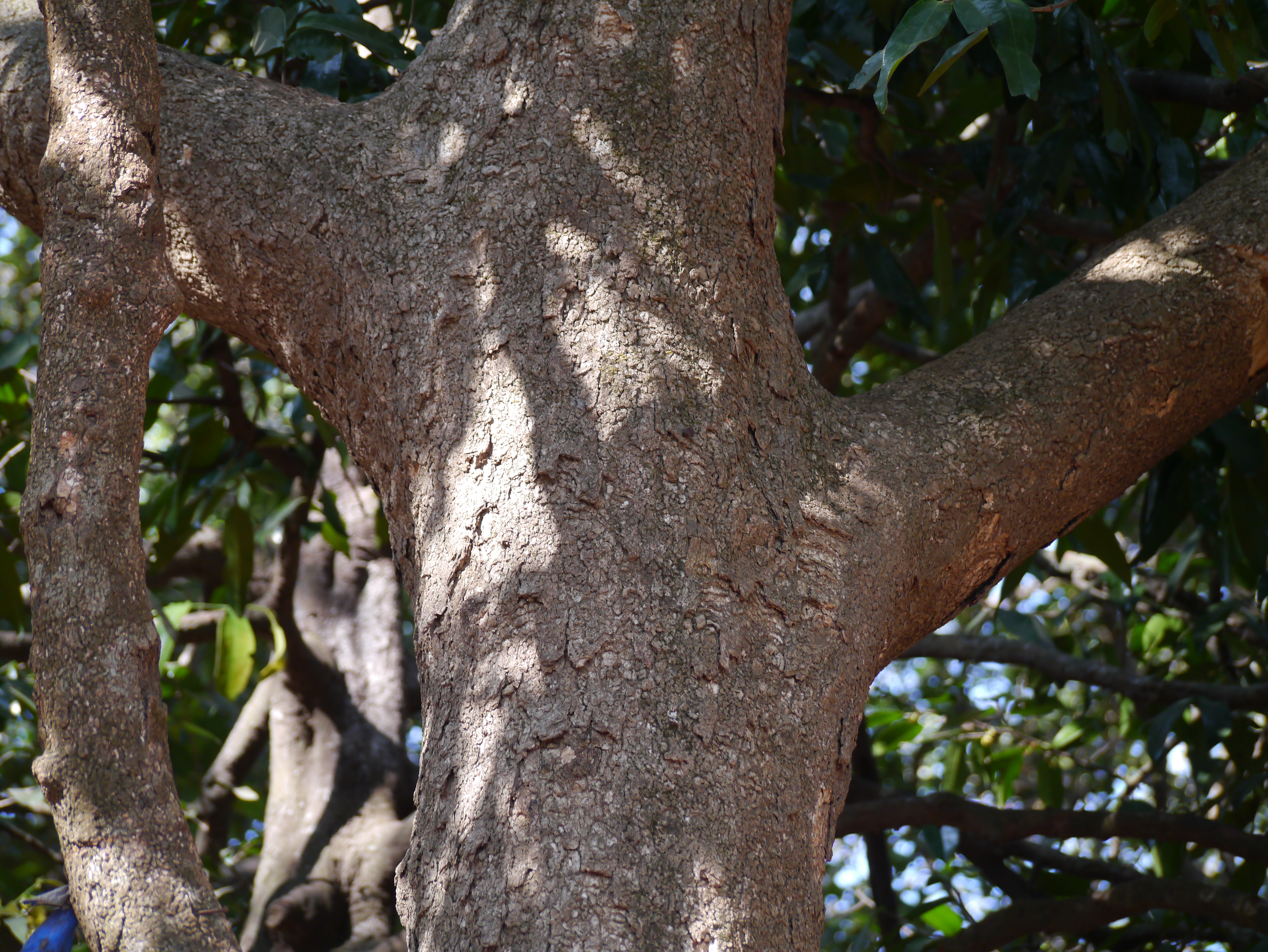
Tree trunk and bark

== Other sources ==
- Jiang, Kan; Chen, Lu-Lin; Wang, Shu-Fang; Wang, Yi; Li, Ya; Gao, Kun (2015). "Anti-inflammatory Terpenoids from the Leaves and Twigs of Dysoxylum gotadhora". J. Nat. Prod. 78 (5): 1037–44. doi:10.1021/np5010196. PMID 25945867.
