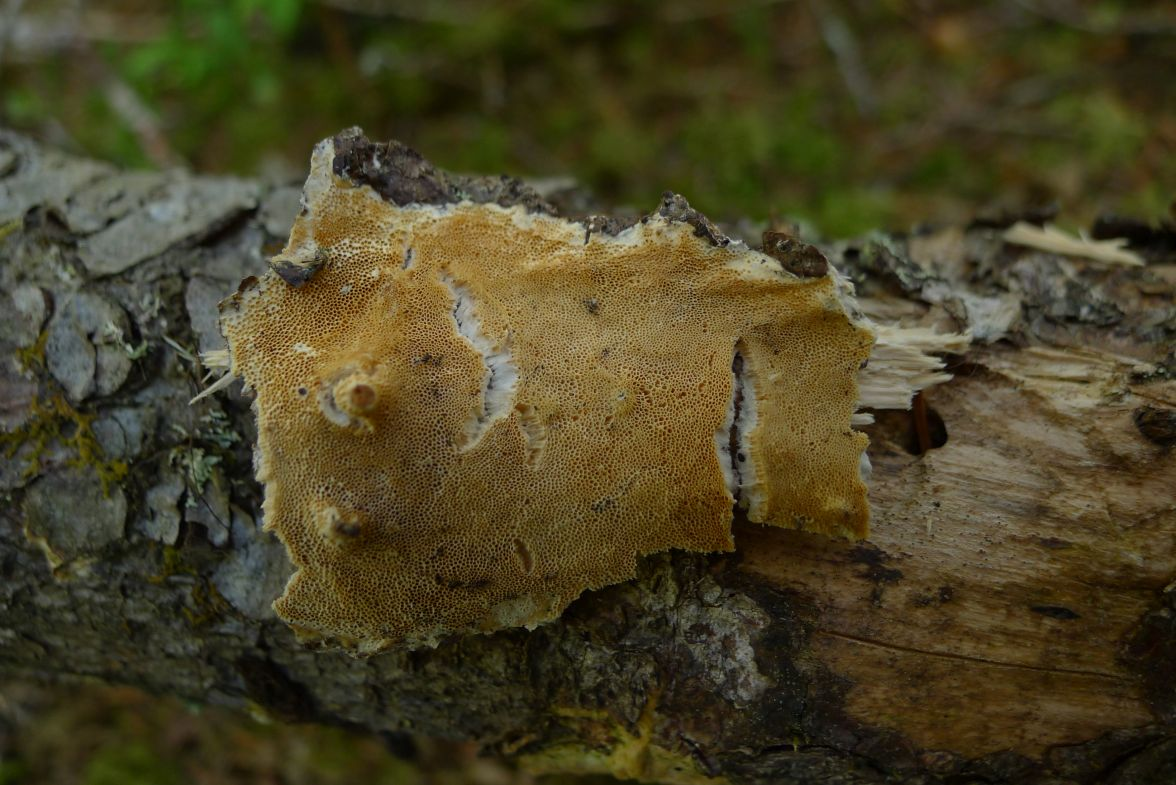

Scientific classification
- Domain: Eukaryota
- Kingdom: Fungi
- Division: Basidiomycota
- Class: Agaricomycetes
- Order: Polyporales
- Family: Polyporaceae
- Genus: Diplomitoporus
- Species: D. crustulinus

Binomial name
- Diplomitoporus crustulinus (Bres.) Domanski

= Diplomitoporus crustulinus =

Species of fungus

Diplomitoporus crustulinus is a species of fungus belonging to the family Polyporaceae.

It is native to Eurasia and Northern America.
