= Dysoxylum papillosum =

Scientific classification
- Kingdom: Plantae
- Clade: Tracheophytes
- Clade: Angiosperms
- Clade: Eudicots
- Clade: Rosids
- Order: Sapindales
- Family: Meliaceae
- Genus: Dysoxylum
- Species: D. papillosum

Binomial name
- Dysoxylum papillosum King

Species of tree

Dysoxylum papillosum is a species of tree in the family Meliaceae. The specific epithet papillosum is from the Latin meaning 'pimpled', referring to the leaf surface when dry.

== Description ==
The tree grows up to 6 metres (20 ft) tall. The bark is grey-green. The fruits are orange-red, pear-shaped, at least 3 cm (1 in) long.

== Distribution and habitat ==
Dysoxylum papillosum is found in Peninsular Thailand, Peninsular Malaysia and Borneo. Its habitat is rain forests at around 500 metres (1,600 ft) altitude.
