= Dysoxylum pachyrhache =

Scientific classification
- Kingdom: Plantae
- Clade: Tracheophytes
- Clade: Angiosperms
- Clade: Eudicots
- Clade: Rosids
- Order: Sapindales
- Family: Meliaceae
- Genus: Dysoxylum
- Species: D. pachyrhache

Binomial name
- Dysoxylum pachyrhache Merr.

Synonyms
- Epicharis pachyrhachis (Merr.) Harms

Species of tree

Dysoxylum pachyrhache is a species of tree in the family Meliaceae. The specific epithet pachyrhache is from the Greek meaning 'thick axis', referring to the axis width of the inflorescence.

== Description ==
The tree grows up to 20 metres (70 ft) tall with a trunk diameter of up to 40 centimetres (16 in). The bark is chocolate-brown. The scented flowers are cream-coloured. The fruits are orange-red, somewhat pear-shaped, and grow up to 8 cm (3 in) long.

== Distribution and habitat ==
Dysoxylum pachyrhache is endemic to Borneo. Its habitat is rain forest from sea-level to 1,600 metres (5,000 ft) elevation.
