= Dysoxylum magnificum =

Scientific classification
- Kingdom: Plantae
- Clade: Tracheophytes
- Clade: Angiosperms
- Clade: Eudicots
- Clade: Rosids
- Order: Sapindales
- Family: Meliaceae
- Genus: Dysoxylum
- Species: D. magnificum

Binomial name
- Dysoxylum magnificum Mabb.

Species of tree

Dysoxylum magnificum is a species of tree in the family Meliaceae. The specific epithet magnificum is from the Latin meaning 'magnificent'.

== Description ==
The tree grows up to 25 metres (80 ft) tall with a trunk diameter of up to 25 centimetres (10 in). The bark is brownish. The flowers are white. The fruits are brown when young, cream-coloured when ripe, roundish, at least 8 cm (3 in) in diameter.

== Distribution and habitat ==
Dysoxylum magnificum is found in Sumatra and Borneo. Its habitat is rain forests from sea-level to 500 metres (1,600 ft) altitude.
