= Prasoxylon =

Scientific classification
- Kingdom: Plantae
- Clade: Tracheophytes
- Clade: Angiosperms
- Clade: Eudicots
- Clade: Rosids
- Order: Sapindales
- Family: Meliaceae
- Subfamily: Melioideae
- Genus: Prasoxylon; M.Roem. (1846)

Type species
- Prasoxylon alliaceum (Blume) M.Roem.

Species
- 7; see text

Genus of flowering plants

Prasoxylon is a genus of flowering plants in the family Meliaceae. It includes seven species which range from Nepal and eastern India through Indochina to southern China, Taiwan, Malesia, Sri Lanka, Papuasia, and Queensland.

The genus was first named by Max Joseph Roemer in 1846. Most of the species currently accepted were until recently included in genus Dysoxylum. A genetic study published in 2021 found that Dysoxylum is polyphyletic, and Prasoxylon was revived and re-circumscribed.

== Species ==
Seven species are accepted.

- Prasoxylon alliaceum (Blume) M.Roem. – Andaman Islands, Indochina, Malesia, Papuasia, and Queensland
- Prasoxylon angustifolium (King) Mabb. – Peninsular Malaysia, Thailand, and Vietnam
- Prasoxylon excelsum (Spreng.) Mabb. – Central Himalayas to southern China, Indochina, Malesia, Sri Lanka, and Papuasia
- Prasoxylon hapalanthum (Harms) Holzmeyer & Mabb. – New Guinea
- Prasoxylon hongkongense (Tutcher) Mabb. – southern China, Hainan, and Taiwan
- Prasoxylon klanderi (F.Muell.) Mabb. & Holzmeyer – Queensland
- Prasoxylon rigidum (Ridl.) Mabb. – Borneo, Sumatra, and Peninsular Malaysia
