= Diplomitoporus microsporus =

Scientific classification
- Domain: Eukaryota
- Kingdom: Fungi
- Division: Basidiomycota
- Class: Agaricomycetes
- Order: Polyporales
- Family: Polyporaceae
- Genus: Diplomitoporus
- Species: D. microsporus

Binomial name
- Diplomitoporus microsporus Iturr. & Ryvarden (2010)

Species of fungus

Diplomitoporus microsporus is a species of poroid fungus in the family Polyporaceae. Found in the Andes region of Venezuela, it was described as a new species in 2010 by mycologists Teresa Iturriaga and Leif Ryvarden.
