= Pseudocarapa =

Scientific classification
- Kingdom: Plantae
- Clade: Tracheophytes
- Clade: Angiosperms
- Clade: Eudicots
- Clade: Rosids
- Order: Sapindales
- Family: Meliaceae
- Subfamily: Melioideae
- Genus: Pseudocarapa; Hemsl. (1884)

Type species
- Pseudocarapa championii (Thwaites) Hemsl.

Species
- 5; see text

Genus of flowering plants

Pseudocarapa is a genus of flowering plants in the family Meliaceae. It includes five species which range from Sri Lanka to Sumatra, Peninsular Malaysia, Borneo, and New Guinea.

The genus is distinguished by its paripinnate leaves, cylindrical staminal tube with appendages, annular or patelliform disk, and pollen shed in tetrads.

The genus was first named by William Hemsley in 1884. Most of the species currently accepted were until recently included in genus Dysoxylum. A genetic study published in 2021 found that Dysoxylum is polyphyletic, and Pseudocarapa was revived and re-circumscribed.

== Species ==
Five species are accepted.

- Pseudocarapa championii (Hook.f. & Thomson ex Thwaites) Hemsl. – Sri Lanka
- Pseudocarapa crassa (Mabb.) Mabb. – Borneo (northern and central Sarawak)
- Pseudocarapa dumosa (King) Holzmeyer & Mabb. – Peninsular Malaysia and Riau Archipelago
- Pseudocarapa inopinata Harms – northern and central New Guinea
- Pseudocarapa yunzaingensis (Merr. & L.M.Perry) Mabb. – eastern New Guinea
