= Goniocheton =

Scientific classification
- Kingdom: Plantae
- Clade: Tracheophytes
- Clade: Angiosperms
- Clade: Eudicots
- Clade: Rosids
- Order: Sapindales
- Family: Meliaceae
- Subfamily: Melioideae
- Genus: Goniocheton; Blume (1825)

Type species
- Goniocheton arborescens Blume

Species
- 4; see text

Genus of flowering plants

Goniocheton is a genus of flowering plants in the family Meliaceae. It includes four species which range from Indochina to south-central China, Taiwan, Malesia, Papuasia, Vanuatu, and Queensland.

The genus was first named by Carl Ludwig Blume in 1825. Most of the species currently accepted were until recently included in genus Dysoxylum. A genetic study published in 2021 found that Dysoxylum is polyphyletic, and Goniocheton was revived and re-circumscribed.

== Species ==
Four species are accepted.

- Goniocheton arborescens Blume – Taiwan, Vietnam, Thailand, Andaman and Nicobar Islands, Malesia, Papuasia, and Vanuatu
- Goniocheton brassii (Merr. & L.M.Perry) Hauenschild & Holzmeyer – New Guinea
- Goniocheton lenticellatus (C.Y.Wu) Mabb. – southern and southeastern Yunnan, Myanmar, and northern Thailand
- Goniocheton tonkinensis (A.Chev. ex Pellegr.) Holzmeyer & Hauenschild – northern Vietnam
