= Dysoxylum cyrtobotryum =

Scientific classification
- Kingdom: Plantae
- Clade: Tracheophytes
- Clade: Angiosperms
- Clade: Eudicots
- Clade: Rosids
- Order: Sapindales
- Family: Meliaceae
- Genus: Dysoxylum
- Species: D. cyrtobotryum

Binomial name
- Dysoxylum cyrtobotryum Miq.

Synonyms
- List: Alliaria cyrtobotrya Kuntze; Alliaria lobbii Kuntze; Alliaria multijuga Kuntze; Dysoxylum alternatum Ridl.; Dysoxylum andamanicum King; Dysoxylum biloculare Koord. & Valeton; Dysoxylum blumei Miq.; Dysoxylum cochinchinense Pierre; Dysoxylum cyrtobotryum f. borneense Miq.; Dysoxylum grandifolium Merr.; Dysoxylum harmandianum Pierre; Dysoxylum hexandrum Merr.; Dysoxylum heyneanum Valeton ex K.Heyne; Dysoxylum kinabaluense Merr.; Dysoxylum lobbii C.DC.; Dysoxylum oblongifoliolum Quisumb. & Merr.; Dysoxylum panayense Merr.; Dysoxylum racemosum King; Dysoxylum tpongense Pierre; Dysoxylum venulosum King

Species of tree

Dysoxylum cyrtobotryum is a species of tree in the family Meliaceae. The specific epithet cyrtobotryum is from the Greek meaning 'curved fruits'.

== Description ==
The tree grows up to 30 metres (100 ft) tall with a trunk diameter of up to 60 centimetres (24 in). The bark is brownish grey. The fragrant flowers are yellow, sometimes with a pinkish apex. The orange-red fruits are round to fig-shaped, measuring up to 5 cm (2 in) in diameter.

== Distribution and habitat ==
Dysoxylum cyrtobotryum is found in the Andaman and Nicobar Islands, Indochina and Malesia. Its habitat is forests from sea-level to 1,800 metres (6,000 ft) altitude.
