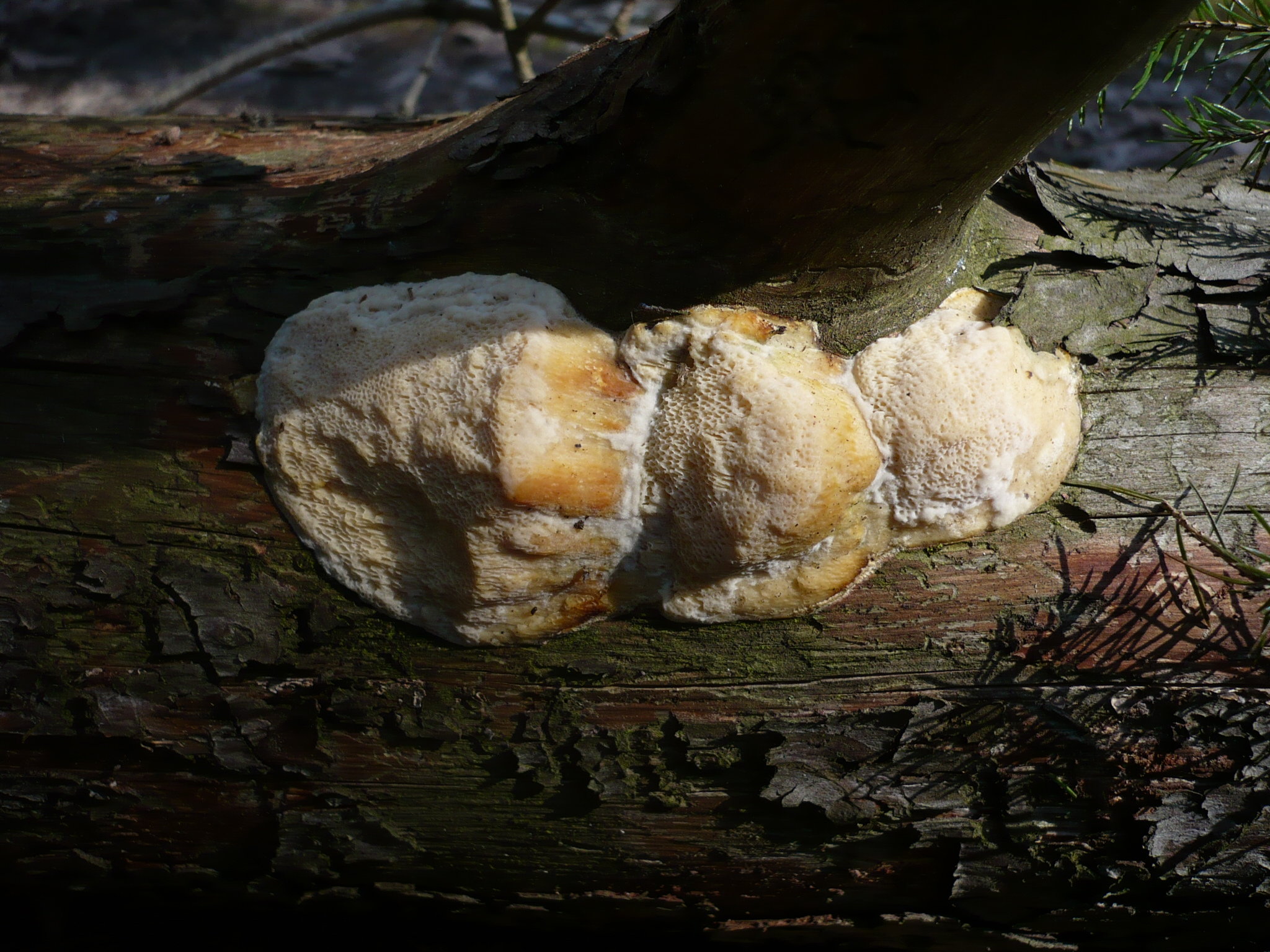
- Diplomitoporus flavescens

Scientific classification
- Kingdom: Fungi
- Division: Basidiomycota
- Class: Agaricomycetes
- Order: Polyporales
- Family: Polyporaceae
- Genus: Diplomitoporus; Domański (1970)

Type species
- Diplomitoporus flavescens (Bres.) Domański (1970)

Synonyms
- Fabisporus Zmitr. (2001)

= Diplomitoporus =

Genus of fungi

Diplomitoporus is a genus of fungi in the family Polyporaceae. The Dictionary of the Fungi (10th edition, 2008) estimated the widespread genus to contain 11 species; since then, the genus has grown with the additional of several newly described species, and some transfers from other genera. Diplomitoporus has been described as a wastebasket taxon, containing "species that share common macroscopic and microscopic characteristics, but are not necessarily related."

Diplomitoporus was circumscribed in 1970 by Polish mycologist Stanislaw Domanski, with Diplomitoporus flavescens as the type species. This species was originally described as a member of Trametes by Giacomo Bresadola in 1903.

== Species ==
As of June 2017, Index Fungorum accepts 21 species of Diplomitoporus:

- Diplomitoporus allantosporus Ryvarden & Iturr. (2003) – Venezuela
- Diplomitoporus costaricensis I.Lindblad & Ryvarden (1999) – Costa Rica
- Diplomitoporus crustulinus (Bres.) Domanski (1970) – Europe; North America
- Diplomitoporus cunninghamii P.K.Buchanan & Ryvarden (1998) – New Zealand
- Diplomitoporus daedaleiformis (Henn.) Ryvarden (2014)
- Diplomitoporus flavescens (Bres.) Domanski (1970) – Europe
- Diplomitoporus globisporus Ryvarden (2013) – Brazil
- Diplomitoporus hondurensis (Murrill) Ryvarden (2000) – Belize
- Diplomitoporus incisus Ryvarden (2000) – Puerto Rico
- Diplomitoporus insularis Ryvarden (2009) – Seychelles
- Diplomitoporus intermedius Baltazar & Ryvarden (2013) – Brazil
- Diplomitoporus marianoi-rochae G.Coelho (2008)
- Diplomitoporus meridionalis M.Pieri & B.Rivoire (1998)
- Diplomitoporus microsporus Iturr. & Ryvarden (2010)
- Diplomitoporus navisporus Gibertoni & Ryvarden (2004) – Brazil
- Diplomitoporus overholtsii (Pilát) Gilb. & Ryvarden (1985) – Uganda
- Diplomitoporus stramineus Ryvarden & Iturr. (2003) – Venezuela
- Diplomitoporus sulphureus (Petch) Ryvarden (2015)
- Diplomitoporus taquarae G.Coelho (2008)
- Diplomitoporus venezuelicus Ryvarden & Iturr. (2003) – Venezuela
