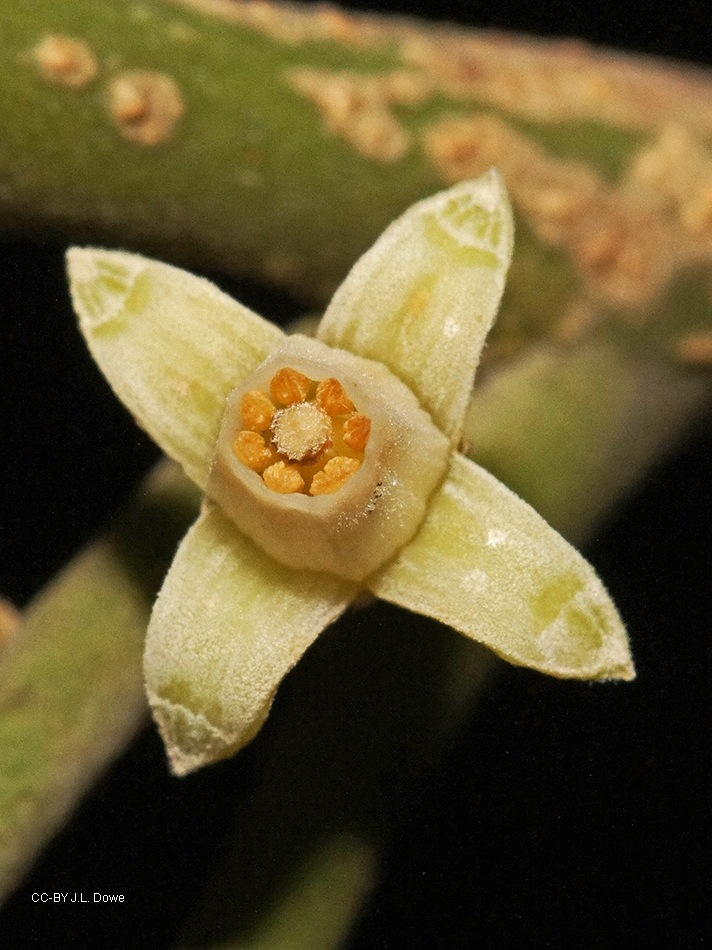
- Flower

Conservation status
- Least Concern (IUCN 3.1)

Scientific classification
- Kingdom: Plantae
- Clade: Tracheophytes
- Clade: Angiosperms
- Clade: Eudicots
- Clade: Rosids
- Order: Sapindales
- Family: Meliaceae
- Genus: Dysoxylum
- Species: D. latifolium

Binomial name
- Dysoxylum latifolium Benth.

Synonyms
- Alliaria latifolia Kuntze; Dysoxylum confertiflorum Merr. & L.M.Perry; Dysoxylum distantinerve F.Muell.

= Dysoxylum latifolium =

Species of flowering plant

Dysoxylum latifolium is a species of plants in the mahogany family Meliaceae native to New Guinea, the Solomon Islands, and the Australian states of Western Australia, Northern Territory and Queensland. It is an evergreen tree to about 30 m (98 ft) tall with a trunk up to 50 cm (20 in) diameter. It inhabits drier rainforest such as monsoon forest, at altitudes from sea level to 250 m (820 ft) in Australia, and 1,200 m (3,900 ft) in New Guinea. It was first described in 1863 by British botanist George Bentham.

== Conservation ==
This species has been assessed to be of least concern by the International Union for Conservation of Nature (IUCN) and by the Queensland Government under its Nature Conservation Act.
