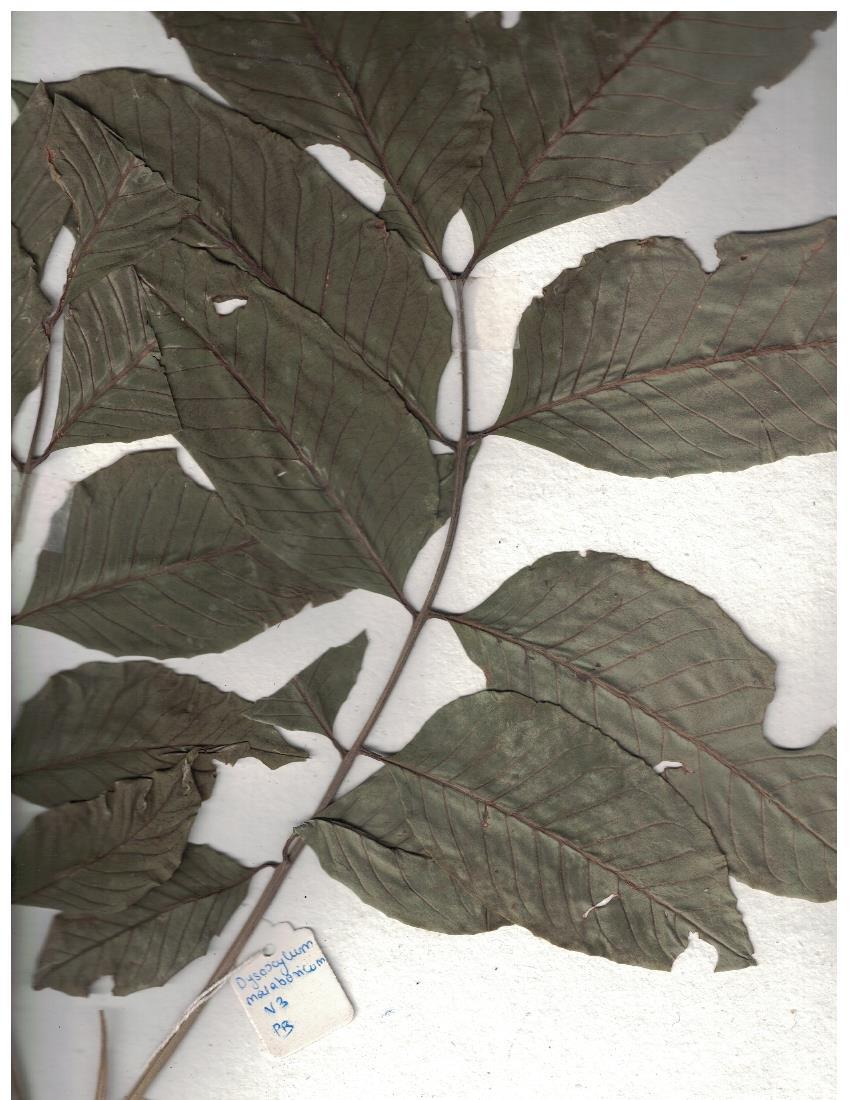

Conservation status
- Endangered (IUCN 3.1)

Scientific classification
- Kingdom: Plantae
- Clade: Embryophytes
- Clade: Tracheophytes
- Clade: Angiosperms
- Clade: Eudicots
- Clade: Rosids
- Order: Sapindales
- Family: Meliaceae
- Genus: Dysoxylum
- Species: D. malabaricum

Binomial name
- Dysoxylum malabaricum Bedd. ex C.DC

Synonyms
- Alliaria malabarica (Bedd. ex C.DC.) Kuntze; Dysoxylum glandulosum Talbot; Dysoxylum malabaricum Bedd.

= Dysoxylum malabaricum =

Species of flowering plant

Dysoxylum malabaricum, or white cedar, is a species of tree endemic to the Western Ghats, India. The species is considered Endangered under the IUCN Red List of Threatened Species.

== Description ==
These are tall canopy trees with a straight bole, growing to a height of about 35 m (115 ft). The bark, about 5–8 mm (0.20–0.31 in) thick, is greyish brown and covered densely with large, corky lenticels. The bark exfoliates in large rectangular scales. When the bark is cut, the blaze appears yellow and white. The young branchlets are angular and minutely hairy. The compound leaves are paripinnate (ending in a pair of leaflets), up to 30 cm (12 in) (occasionally 40 cm (16 in)) long, arranged alternate, spiral, and clustered at twig ends. The petiole is pulvinate (swollen at base). The rachis is angular, 17–20 cm (6.7–7.9 in) long. The leaves have 4-6 pairs of leaflets with petiolules about 0.5–0.9 cm (0.20–0.35 in) long. The leaflets are alternate or subopposite, about 9–22 cm (3.5–8.7 in) in length by 4–7 cm (1.6–2.8 in) wide. Leaflets are coriaceous, elliptic-lanceolate in shape and have an acuminate apex, asymmetric base, and an entire margin. The midrib is raised above the dorsal surface of the leaf. Leaflets have 12-20 pairs of prominent secondary nerves, with hairy domatia in the axils of the secondary nerves. Tertiary nerves are obscurely visible and reticulo-percurrent. Prominent inter-secondary veins are seen between secondary nerves.

The inflorescence is a panicled raceme, shorter than leaves. The bisexual flowers are greenish yellow in colour and fragrant, about 5–6 mm (0.20–0.24 in) long. They have a deeply 4-lobed calyx, 4 petals, 8 anthers, and a superior ovary, densely hairy, 4-celled, and with 2 ovules in each cell. The fruit is a capsule, about 5–7.5 cm (2.0–3.0 in) long, bright yellow, with 4 longitudinal furrows. Each fruit has 3-4 seeds, reddish-brown in colour and bluntly triangular in cross section.

== Range ==
It is found in the mountains of the central and southern Western Ghats, between 200 and 1,200 m (660 and 3,940 ft) elevation.

== Habitat ==
Occurs in evergreen and semi-evergreen forests.

== Ecology ==
A rare tree found in low and mid-elevation tropical wet evergreen forests of the Western Ghats. The fruits of this tree were dispersed by wood pigeons and Malabar grey hornbills. A study found that the hornbills ability to disperse the seeds of this plant to long distance is supposedly helping maintain the genetic diversity of this tree species.

== Etymology ==
The etymology of Dysoxylum derives from the Greek word 'Dys' meaning "bad", referring to "ill-smelling", and 'Xylon' meaning "wood". The specific epithet 'malabaricum' refers to the Malabar region of south-western India. The species is also known by many local names in the region of its distribution: Vellaiyagil, Purippa (Tamil), Akil, Kana mulla, Purippa, Vellakil (Malayalam), Bili agilu (Kannada).
