= Dysoxylum grande =

Scientific classification
- Kingdom: Plantae
- Clade: Tracheophytes
- Clade: Angiosperms
- Clade: Eudicots
- Clade: Rosids
- Order: Sapindales
- Family: Meliaceae
- Genus: Dysoxylum
- Species: D. grande

Binomial name
- Dysoxylum grande Hiern

Synonyms
- Alliaria grandis Kuntze; Chisocheton costatus Hiern; Dysoxylum corneri M.R.Hend.; Dysoxylum interruptum King; Dysoxylum lasiophyllum Baker f.; Dysoxylum lobbii var. sumatranum Baker f.; Dysoxylum lukii Merr.; Dysoxylum lukii var. paucinervium F.C.How & T.Chen; Dysoxylum verruculosum Merr.; Guarea grandis Wall.

Species of tree

Dysoxylum grande is a species of tree in the family Meliaceae. The specific epithet grande is from the Latin meaning 'large'.

== Description ==
The tree grows up to 39 metres (130 ft) tall with a trunk diameter of up to 70 centimetres (28 in). The bark is greyish brown. The fragrant flowers are creamy-yellow. The fruits are orange, roundish, up to 11 cm (4 in) in diameter.

== Distribution and habitat ==
Dysoxylum grande is found in India, south China, Thailand and Malesia. Its habitat is rain forest from sea-level to 1,400 metres (5,000 ft) altitude.
