= Dysoxylum rugulosum =

Conservation status
- Least Concern (IUCN 3.1)

Scientific classification
- Kingdom: Plantae
- Clade: Tracheophytes
- Clade: Angiosperms
- Clade: Eudicots
- Clade: Rosids
- Order: Sapindales
- Family: Meliaceae
- Genus: Dysoxylum
- Species: D. rugulosum

Binomial name
- Dysoxylum rugulosum King

Synonyms
- Dysoxylum fulvum Airy Shaw; Dysoxylum undulatum M.R.Hend.

Species of tree

Dysoxylum rugulosum is a species of tree in the family Meliaceae. The specific epithet rugulosum means 'small wrinkles', referring to the surface of the leaflets.

== Description ==
Dysoxylum rugulosum grows up to 20 metres (70 ft) tall with a trunk diameter of up to 20 centimetres (8 in). The bark is brown. The sweetly scented flowers are yellowish. The fruits are orange, multi-lobed, up to 5 cm (2 in) long.

== Distribution and habitat ==
Dysoxylum rugulosum is found in Sumatra, Peninsular Malaysia and Borneo. Its habitat is rain forests from sea-level to 2,050 metres (6,700 ft) altitude.
