= Dysoxylum carolinae =

Scientific classification
- Kingdom: Plantae
- Clade: Tracheophytes
- Clade: Angiosperms
- Clade: Eudicots
- Clade: Rosids
- Order: Sapindales
- Family: Meliaceae
- Genus: Dysoxylum
- Species: D. carolinae

Binomial name
- Dysoxylum carolinae Mabb.

Species of tree

Dysoxylum carolinae is a species of tree in the family Meliaceae. It is named for the English botanist Caroline Pannell.

== Description ==
The tree grows up to 45 metres (150 ft) tall with a trunk diameter of up to 110 centimetres (40 in). The bark is grey to dark brown. The flowers are citronella-scented. The fruits are orange-red, roundish, up to 8 cm (3 in) in diameter.

== Distribution and habitat ==
Dysoxylum carolinae is found in Vietnam and western Malesia. Its habitat is forests from sea-level to 1,100 metres (4,000 ft) altitude.
