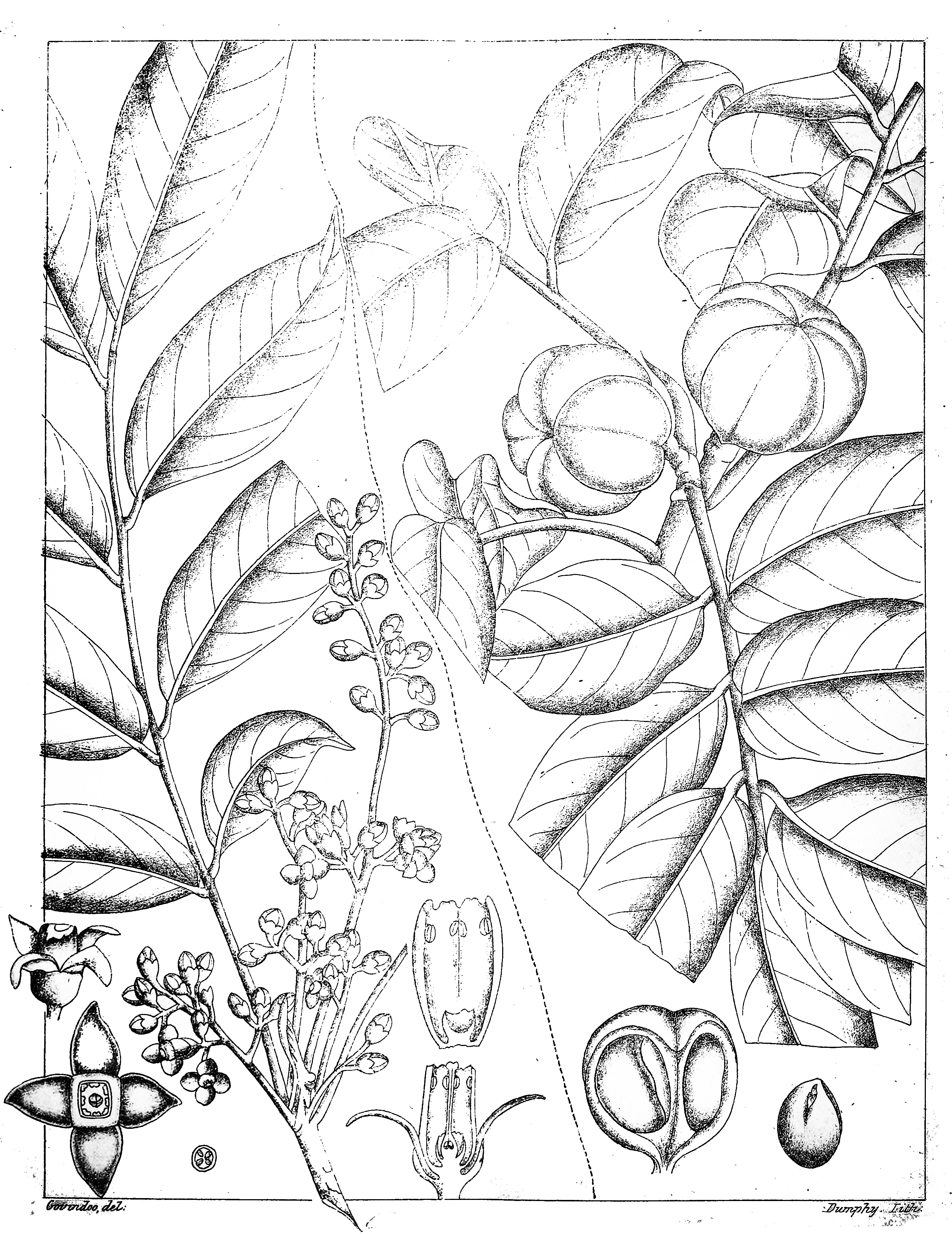

Scientific classification
- Kingdom: Plantae
- Clade: Tracheophytes
- Clade: Angiosperms
- Clade: Eudicots
- Clade: Rosids
- Order: Sapindales
- Family: Meliaceae
- Genus: Dysoxylum
- Species: D. macrocarpum

Binomial name
- Dysoxylum macrocarpum Blume

Synonyms
- Alliaria macrocarpa (Blume) Kuntze; Dysoxylum macrocarpum f. sumatranum Miq.

= Dysoxylum macrocarpum =

Species of tree

Dysoxylum macrocarpum is a species of tree in the family Meliaceae. The specific epithet macrocarpum is from the Greek meaning 'large fruit'.

== Description ==
The tree grows up to 33 metres (110 ft) tall with a trunk diameter of up to 50 centimetres (20 in). The bark is grey-green. The flowers are creamy-white to orangeish. The fruits are orange-red, round to pear-shaped, up to 10 cm (4 in) in diameter.

== Distribution and habitat ==
Dysoxylum macrocarpum is found in Thailand and Malesia. Its habitat is forests from sea-level to 1,800 metres (6,000 ft) altitude.
