= Dysoxylum oppositifolium =

Scientific classification
- Kingdom: Plantae
- Clade: Tracheophytes
- Clade: Angiosperms
- Clade: Eudicots
- Clade: Rosids
- Order: Sapindales
- Family: Meliaceae
- Genus: Dysoxylum
- Species: D. oppositifolium

Binomial name
- Dysoxylum oppositifolium F.Muell.

Synonyms
- 9 synonyms: Alliaria oppositifolia Kuntze; Alliaria turczaninowii Kuntze; Dysoxylum capizense Merr.; Dysoxylum ilocanum Merr.; Dysoxylum palawanense Merr.; Dysoxylum ramosii Merr.; Dysoxylum turczaninowii C.DC.; Dysoxylum venosum Merr.; Dysoxylum wenzelii Merr.

Species of tree

Dysoxylum oppositifolium is a species of tree in the family Meliaceae. The specific epithet oppositifolium is from the Latin meaning 'opposite leaf', referring to the leaves being on opposite sides of the twig.

== Description ==
The tree grows up to 30 metres (100 ft) tall with a trunk diameter of up to 40 centimetres (16 in). The bark is yellow-brown. The flowers are creamish-coloured. The fruits are orange-black, pear-shaped, up to 3 cm (1 in) in diameter.

== Distribution and habitat ==
Dysoxylum oppositifolium is found in Borneo, the Philippines, New Guinea and northeast Australia. Its habitat is rain forests from 300 metres (1,000 ft) to 500 metres (1,600 ft) altitude.
