= Dysoxylum acutangulum =

Scientific classification
- Kingdom: Plantae
- Clade: Tracheophytes
- Clade: Angiosperms
- Clade: Eudicots
- Clade: Rosids
- Order: Sapindales
- Family: Meliaceae
- Genus: Dysoxylum
- Species: D. acutangulum

Binomial name
- Dysoxylum acutangulum Miq. (1861)

Subspecies
- Dysoxylum acutangulum subsp. acutangulum; Dysoxylum acutangulum subsp. foveolatum (Radlk.) Mabb.

Synonyms
- Alliaria acutangula (Miq.) Kuntze (1891)

Species of flowering plant

Dysoxylum acutangulum is a species of flowering plant in the mahogany family, Meliaceae. It is a tree native to Peninsular Thailand, Malesia (Borneo, Java, Lesser Sunda Islands, Peninsular Malaysia, Maluku Islands, Philippines (Palawan), and Sumatra), New Guinea and the Solomon Islands, and the Northern Territory and Queensland in Australia.

== Description ==
Dysoxylum acutangulum is an evergreen tree growing to 37 meters tall, with a bole up to 1.4 meters in diameter. The trunks of mature trees are buttressed up to 3 m tall and 2 meters out. The bark is yellowish and smooth to scaling. It flowers from September to December, and fruits in January and February. Subspecies acutangulum differs from subsp. foveolatum in having broader leaflets without domatia.

== Habitat ==
In Malesia and Papuasia it is a rain forest tree growing from sea level up to 950 metres elevation. The seeds are eaten by the pied imperial pigeon (Ducula bicolor).

In Australia it is native to the Bonaparte Archipelago of Western Australia, the Top End of the Northern Territory, and the Cape York Peninsula of Queensland to 16° S Latitude. It grows in rain forests and forested creeks and gullies from 30 to 600 metres elevation. In open areas it grows and flowers as a treelet a few meters tall.

== Subspecies ==
Two subspecies are accepted:

- Dysoxylum acutangulum subsp. acutangulum – Peninsular Thailand, Peninsular Malaysia, Sumatra, Borneo, and Palawan
- Dysoxylum acutangulum subsp. foveolatum (Radlk.) Mabb. (synonyms Dysoxylum foveolatum Radlk., Alliaria schultzei (C.DC.) Kuntze, and Dysoxylum schultzei C.DC.) – Java, Lesser Sunda Islands, Maluku Islands, New Guinea, Northern Territory, Queensland, Solomon Islands, and southern Sumatra

== Uses ==
In northern Malesia subsp. acutangulum is one of the most important timber species of the Meliaceae, and is known commercially as membalo. It is used for furniture as well as coffins and cartwheels.
