= Dysoxylum brachybotrys =

Scientific classification
- Kingdom: Plantae
- Clade: Tracheophytes
- Clade: Angiosperms
- Clade: Eudicots
- Clade: Rosids
- Order: Sapindales
- Family: Meliaceae
- Genus: Dysoxylum
- Species: D. brachybotrys

Binomial name
- Dysoxylum brachybotrys Merr. (1925)

Synonyms
- Dysoxylum alternifolium Elmer (1937), no Latin descr.; Dysoxylum brachystachys Ridl.; Dysoxylum revolutum Elmer (1937), no Latin descr.

Species of tree

Dysoxylum brachybotrys is a species of tree in the family Meliaceae. The specific epithet brachybotrys is from the Greek meaning 'short bunch', referring to the inflorescence.

== Description ==
The tree grows up to 20 metres (70 ft) tall with a trunk diameter of up to 15 centimetres (6 in). The flowers are cream-coloured. The fruits are red when ripe, pear-shaped, up to 3.5 cm (1 in) long.

== Distribution and habitat ==
Dysoxylum brachybotrys is native to Borneo and the southern Philippines (Mindanao). Its habitat is forests from sea-level to 1,200 metres (4,000 ft) elevation.
