= Dysoxylum flavescens =

Conservation status
- Least Concern (IUCN 3.1)

Scientific classification
- Kingdom: Plantae
- Clade: Tracheophytes
- Clade: Angiosperms
- Clade: Eudicots
- Clade: Rosids
- Order: Sapindales
- Family: Meliaceae
- Genus: Dysoxylum
- Species: D. flavescens

Binomial name
- Dysoxylum flavescens Hiern

Synonyms
- Alliaria flavescens (Hiern) Kuntze; Alliaria griffithii (Hiern) Kuntze; Dysoxylum griffithii Hiern; Hartighsea ramiflora Griff.

Species of flowering plant

Dysoxylum flavescens is a species of tree in the family Meliaceae. The specific epithet flavescens is from the Latin meaning 'yellowish', referring to the petals.

== Description ==
The tree grows up to 33 metres (110 ft) tall with a trunk diameter of up to 70 centimetres (28 in). The bark is brown. The flowers are creamy-yellow. The fruits are reddish orange, roundish, at least 4 cm (2 in) in diameter.

== Distribution and habitat ==
Dysoxylum flavescens is found in Sumatra, Peninsular Malaysia and Borneo. Its habitat is rain forest from sea-level to 1,700 metres (6,000 ft) altitude.
