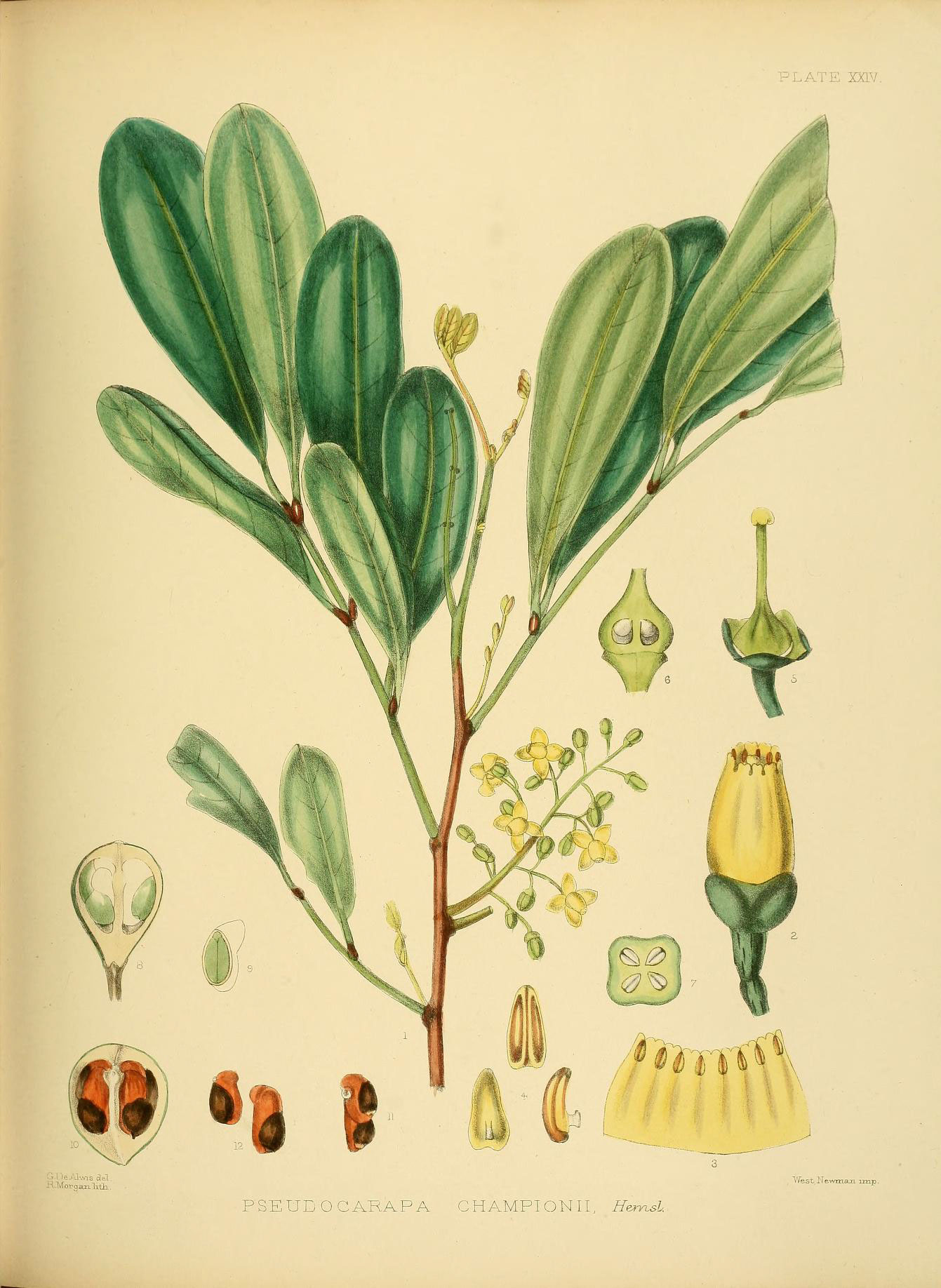

Conservation status
- Vulnerable (IUCN 2.3)

Scientific classification
- Kingdom: Plantae
- Clade: Tracheophytes
- Clade: Angiosperms
- Clade: Eudicots
- Clade: Rosids
- Order: Sapindales
- Family: Meliaceae
- Genus: Pseudocarapa
- Species: P. championii

Binomial name
- Pseudocarapa championii (Hook.f. & Thomson ex. Thwaites) Hemsl. (1884)

Synonyms
- Amoora championii (Hook.f. & Thomson ex Thwaites) Thwaites (1864); Pseudocarapa championii (Hook.f. & Thomson ex Thwaites (1858)

= Pseudocarapa championii =

Species of tree

Pseudocarapa championii is a species of tree in the Meliaceae family. It is endemic to Sri Lanka.

== Culture ==
Known as "gon panaa — ගොන් පනා" in Sinhala.
