= Prasoxylon rigidum =

Scientific classification
- Kingdom: Plantae
- Clade: Tracheophytes
- Clade: Angiosperms
- Clade: Eudicots
- Clade: Rosids
- Order: Sapindales
- Family: Meliaceae
- Genus: Prasoxylon
- Species: P. rigidum

Binomial name
- Prasoxylon rigidum (Ridl.) Mabb. (2021)

Synonyms
- Chisocheton rigidus Ridl. (1929); Dysoxylum rigidum (Ridl.) Mabb. (1982)

Species of tree

Prasoxylon rigidum is a tree in the family Meliaceae. The specific epithet rigidum is from the Latin meaning 'rigid', likely referring to the leaflets.

== Description ==
The tree grows up to 30 metres (100 ft) tall with a trunk diameter of up to 60 centimetres (24 in). The bark is reddish-grey and when slashed releases an onion-like scent. The fruits are pink to purplish-brown, roundish, up to 2.8 cm (1 in) in diameter.

== Distribution and habitat ==
Prasoxylon rigidum is found in Sumatra, Peninsular Malaysia and Borneo. Its habitat is lowland rain forest from sea-level to 260 metres (1,000 ft) elevation.
