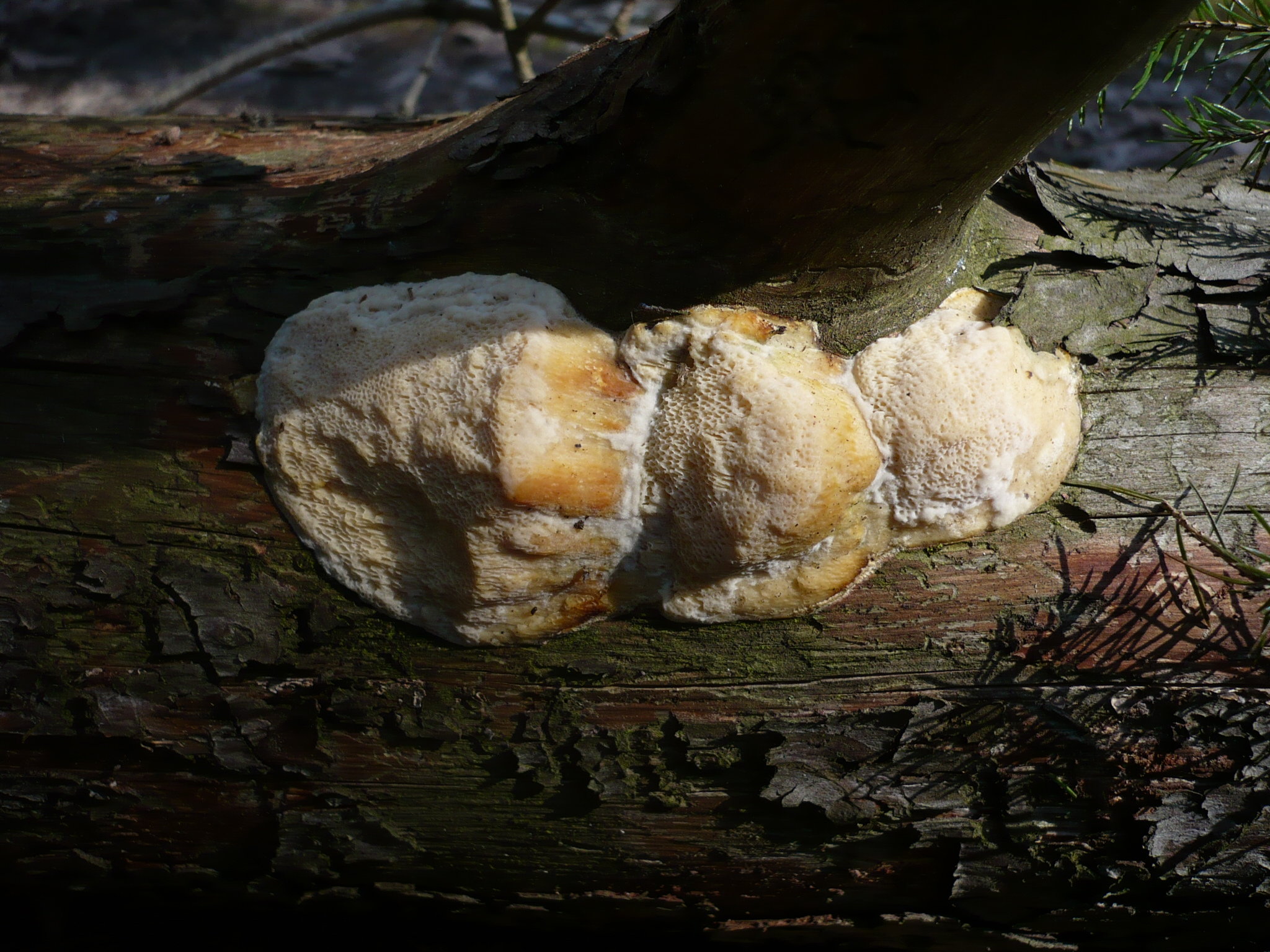

Scientific classification
- Domain: Eukaryota
- Kingdom: Fungi
- Division: Basidiomycota
- Class: Agaricomycetes
- Order: Polyporales
- Family: Polyporaceae
- Genus: Diplomitoporus
- Species: D. flavescens

Binomial name
- Diplomitoporus flavescens (Bres.) Domański (1970)

Synonyms
- Trametes flavescens Bres. (1903); Coriolellus flavescens (Bres.) Bondartsev & Singer (1941); Daedalea flavescens (Bres.) Aoshima (1967); Antrodia flavescens (Bres.) Ryvarden (1973); Fabisporus flavescens (Bres.) Zmitr. (2001); Polyporus winogradowii Bondartsev (1912)

= Diplomitoporus flavescens =

Species of fungus

Diplomitoporus flavescens is a species of poroid crust fungus in the family Polyporaceae.

== Taxonomy ==
It was first described by Italian mycologist Giacomo Bresadola in 1903 as Trametes flavescens. Stanislaw Domański made it the type species of his newly created genus Diplomitoporus in 1970.

== Habitat and distribution ==
Diplomitoporus flavescens has a circumpolar distribution that extends to eastern Canada. The fungus is rare in Northern Europe, where it is restricted to old-growth forests that are dominated by spruce trees. In this region it tends to prefer host trees that have no or few other fungi growing on it, and that have fallen in a relatively healthy state. The fungus has also been recorded in the polypore-biodiverse Changbaishan region in northeastern China. In 2016, D. flavescens was reported for the first time in Turkey, where it was found growing on a branch of black pine.
