= Pseudocarapa crassa =

Conservation status
- Vulnerable (IUCN 3.1)

Scientific classification
- Kingdom: Plantae
- Clade: Tracheophytes
- Clade: Angiosperms
- Clade: Eudicots
- Clade: Rosids
- Order: Sapindales
- Family: Meliaceae
- Genus: Pseudocarapa
- Species: P. crassa

Binomial name
- Pseudocarapa crassa (Mabb.) Mabb. (2021)

Synonyms
- Dysoxylum crassum Mabb. (1994)

Species of tree

Pseudocarapa crassa is a tree in the family Meliaceae. The specific epithet crassum is from the Latin meaning 'thick', referring to the parts of the flowers.

== Description ==
The tree grows up to 30 metres (100 ft) tall with a trunk diameter of up to 45 centimetres (20 in). The bark is fawn-coloured to dark purplish brown. The sweetly scented flowers are pale green to creamy-white. The fruits are round, at least 3 cm (1 in) in diameter.

== Distribution and habitat ==
Pseudocarapa crassa is endemic to Borneo. Its habitat is dipterocarp and kerangas forests from 700 metres (2,300 ft) to 1,150 metres (4,000 ft) elevation.
