= Prasoxylon alliaceum =

Conservation status
- Least Concern (IUCN 3.1)

Scientific classification
- Kingdom: Plantae
- Clade: Embryophytes
- Clade: Tracheophytes
- Clade: Spermatophytes
- Clade: Angiosperms
- Clade: Eudicots
- Clade: Rosids
- Order: Sapindales
- Family: Meliaceae
- Genus: Prasoxylon
- Species: P. alliaceum

Binomial name
- Prasoxylon alliaceum (Blume) M.Roem. (1846)

Synonyms
- List: Alliaria acuminatissima Kuntze (1891); Alliaria costulata Kuntze (1891); Alliaria fraterna (Miq.) Kuntze (1891); Alliaria glabra (C.DC.) Kuntze (1891); Alliaria lampongum Kuntze (1891); Alliaria miqueliana (C.DC.) Kuntze (1891); Alliaria nageliana (C.DC.) Kuntze (1891); Alliaria similis (Spreng.) Kuntze (1891); Alliaria thyrsoidea (Hiern) Kuntze (1891); Alliaria vrieseana (C.DC.) Kuntze (1891); Amoora oligosperma Pierre (1897); Chisocheton dempoensis Baker f. (1924); Dysoxylum aculeatissimum Steud. (1840), orth. var.; Dysoxylum acuminatissimum Blume ex M.Roem. (1846); Dysoxylum alliaceum (Blume) Blume ex A.Juss. (1832); Dysoxylum alliaceum var. lanceolatum Koord. & Valeton (1896); Dysoxylum alliaceum var. laxiflorum (Blume ex G.Don) C.DC. (1878); Dysoxylum alliaceum var. pauciflorum Koord. & Valeton (1896); Dysoxylum apoense Elmer (1937), no Latin descr.; Dysoxylum archboldianum Merr. & L.M.Perry (1940); Dysoxylum brachycalycinum Harms (1942); Dysoxylum brevipes Hiern (1875); Dysoxylum costulatum (Miq.) Miq. (1868); Dysoxylum dempoense (Baker f.) Harms (1940); Dysoxylum euphlebium Merr. (1914); Dysoxylum excelsum var. glabriflorum Miq. (1868); Dysoxylum fraternum Miq. (1868); Dysoxylum glabrum C.DC. (1878); Dysoxylum klemmei Merr. (1909); Dysoxylum lampongum Miq. (1861); Dysoxylum lanceolatum Elmer (1937), no Latin descr.; Dysoxylum laxiflorum Blume ex G.Don (1831); Dysoxylum longifolium Blume ex M.Roem. (1846); Dysoxylum macrothyrsum Miq. (1868), nom. illeg.; Dysoxylum miquelianum C.DC. (1878); Dysoxylum monticola Harms (1942); Dysoxylum nagelianum C.DC. (1878); Dysoxylum platyphyllum Merr. (1913); Dysoxylum pulchrum Ridl. (1917); Dysoxylum rostratum Merr. (1914); Dysoxylum sattelbergense Merr. & L.M.Perry (1940); Dysoxylum simile (Spreng.) Blume ex G.Don (1831); Dysoxylum thyrsoideum Hiern (1875); Dysoxylum thyrsoideum var. andamanicum King (1895); Dysoxylum vrieseanum C.DC. (1878); Guarea alliacea Blume (1824); Hartighsea costulata Miq. (1861); Trichilia similis Spreng. (1827)

Species of tree from tropical Asia

Prasoxylon alliaceum is a tree in the family Meliaceae. The specific epithet alliaceum is from the Latin meaning 'onion-like', referring to the smell of the inner bark.

== Description ==
The tree grows up to 38 metres (120 ft) tall with a trunk diameter of up to 80 centimetres (30 in). The sweetly scented flowers are white or pinkish. The fruits are greenish-white when unripe, red when ripe, roundish, up to 7.5 cm (3 in) in diameter.

== Distribution and habitat ==
Dysoxylum alliaceum is native to the Andaman Islands, Myanmar, Thailand, Vietnam, and throughout Malesia and Papuasia to the Solomon Islands and Queensland, Australia. Its habitat is rain forests from sea-level to 1,800 metres (6,000 ft) elevation.
