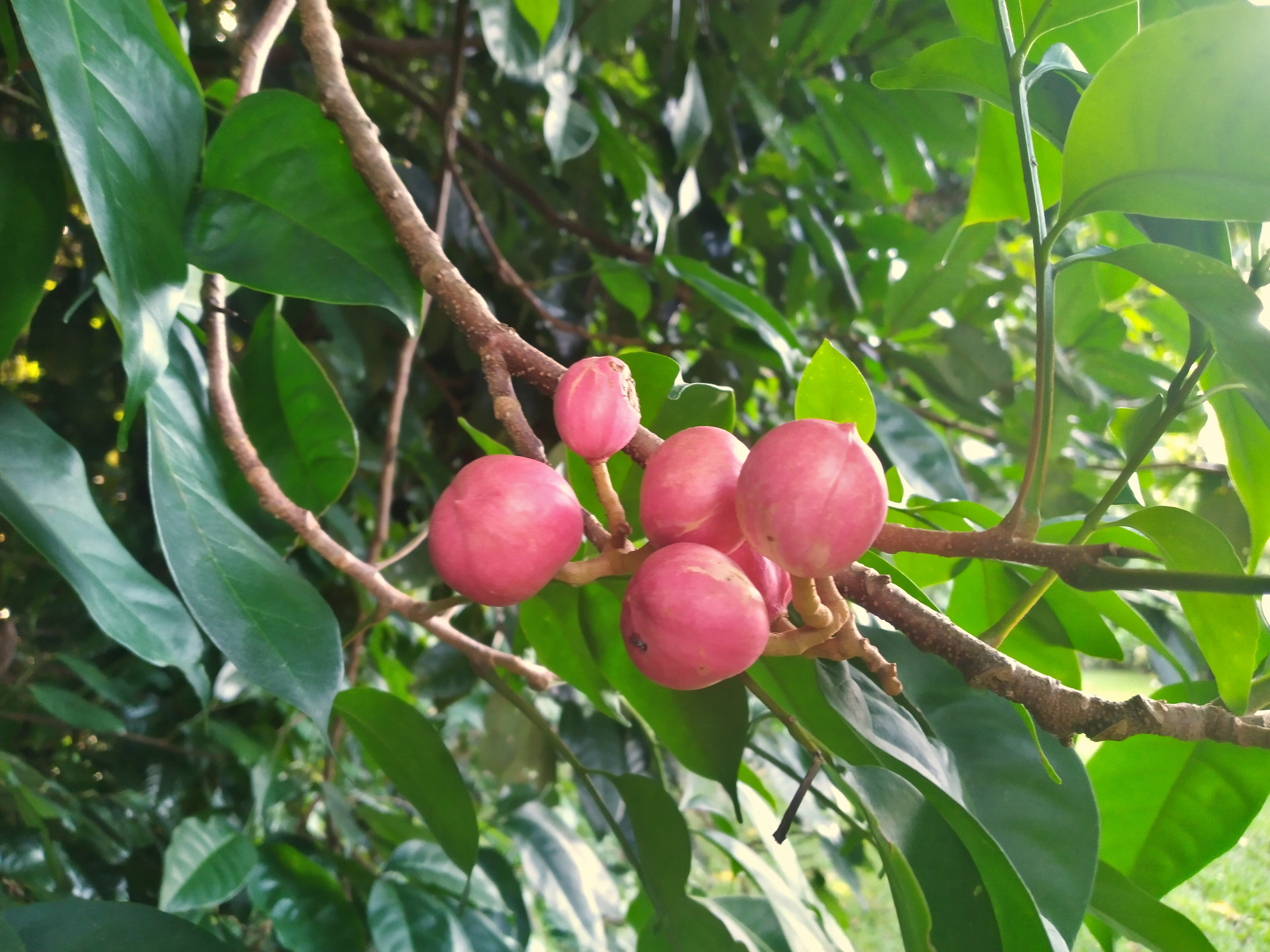
- Fruiting tree in Cairns, QLD, March 2022

Conservation status
- Least Concern (NCA)

Scientific classification
- Kingdom: Plantae
- Clade: Tracheophytes
- Clade: Angiosperms
- Clade: Eudicots
- Clade: Rosids
- Order: Sapindales
- Family: Meliaceae
- Genus: Goniocheton
- Species: G. arborescens

Binomial name
- Goniocheton arborescens Blume

Synonyms
- List: Aglaia halmaheirae (Blume) Miq.; Aglaia macrophylla Teijsm. & Binn.; Alliaria arborescens Kuntze; Alliaria halmaheirae Kuntze; Alliaria kunthiana Kuntze; Alliaria maingayi Kuntze; Alliaria nernstii Kuntze; Dysoxylum arborescens Miq.; Dysoxylum arborescens f. ceramicum Miq.; Dysoxylum arborescens var. timorense (Miq.) C.DC.; Dysoxylum arborescens f. timorense Miq.; Dysoxylum forsythianum Warb.; Dysoxylum gjellerupii C.DC.; Dysoxylum halmaheirae (Miq.) C.DC.; Dysoxylum halmaheirae var. subobovatum C.DC.; Dysoxylum insulare Pierre; Dysoxylum kunthianum (A.Juss.) Miq.; Dysoxylum maingayi Hiern; Dysoxylum nernstii F.Muell.; Dysoxylum novohebridanum C.DC.; Dysoxylum rubrum Merr.; Dysoxylum sibuyanense Elmer; Epicharis kunthiana A.Juss.; Goniocheton insularis Pierre; Hartighsea acuminata Miq.; Hartighsea sumatrana Miq.; Trichilia arborescens (Blume) Spreng.

= Goniocheton arborescens =

Mossman mahogany

Species of plant in the mahogany family

Goniocheton arborescens, commonly known in Australia as Mossman mahogany, is a small tree in the mahogany family Meliaceae. It is native to rainforests of Malesia, Papuasia, Queensland and nearby islands.

== Description ==
The Mossman mahogany usually grows to around 20 m (70 ft) high, occasionally to 30 m (100 ft), but it may flower and fruit when only 1 m (3 ft 3 in) high. The trunk can reach a diameter of up to 45 centimetres (18 in), and may be fluted or possess buttresses up to 1 m (3 ft) tall. It has bark that is grey-brown, smooth or with mild cracking, and which bears large conspicuous lenticels. The leafy twigs are also grey-brown and lenticellate.

The compound leaves are arranged in whorls or spirals and are pinnate with 5 to 9 leaflets, usually with a terminal leaflet. The petioles are glabrous, about 7 cm (3 in) long, and swollen at the junction with the twig. The leaves have 5 to 9 glabrous leaflets which are dark green above and lighter below, and measure up to 18 by 7 cm (7 by 3 in). The proximal leaflets (i.e. the ones closest to the twig) are the smallest, with successive leaflets getting larger, and the terminal leaflet is the largest.

The inflorescence is an axillary thyrse measuring up to 8 cm (3.1 in) long which is covered in minute tawny hairs. The sweetly scented flowers measure around 10 mm (0.39 in), and are creamy-green to white with usually 5 petals up to 10 by 2.2 mm (0.4 by 0.1 in). A staminal tube rises from the base of the petals, and has 10 anthers about 1 mm (0.039 in) long inserted close to the distal end.

The fruits are slightly flattened globular capsules up to 3 cm (1 in) in diameter. They are glabrous, bright pink-red in colour and usually contains 5 seeds.

== Taxonomy ==
This species was originally described as Goniocheton arborescens in 1825 by the German-Dutch botanist Carl Ludwig Blume, but was transferred to the genus Dysoxylum in 1868 by the Dutch botanist Friedrich Anton Wilhelm Miquel. It was published in his paper Monographia Meliacearum Archipelagi Indici, in Annales Musei Botanici Lugduno-Batavi Vol 4 p.24 In 2021 a wide ranging review of Dysoxylum found that the genus was polyphyletic (i.e. the most recent ancestor of the members was not the same for all members. As a result this species was placed back in its original genus Goniocheton.

=== Etymology ===
The species epithet is from the Latin word arborescens, meaning 'tree-like', which may be a reference to its relatively small stature.

== Ecology ==
This tree is the host for larvae of the orange emperor butterfly.

== Cultivation and uses ==
The Australian botanist David L. Jones wrote in his 1986 book Rainforest Plants of Australia that this species "has good potential as a garden plant and is of manageable dimensions".

== Distribution and habitat ==
Goniocheton arborescens is native to the Andaman and Nicobar Islands, Taiwan, Malaysia, Borneo, Indonesia, New Guinea the Bismark Archipelago, Queensland, the Solomon Islands and Vanuatu. It is a common species, growing in a variety of rainforest habitats from sea-level to 1,500 metres (4,900 ft) elevation.

== Conservation ==
This species is listed by Queensland's Department of Environment, Science and Innovation as least concern. As of 17 February 2024, it has not been assessed by the IUCN.

== Gallery ==
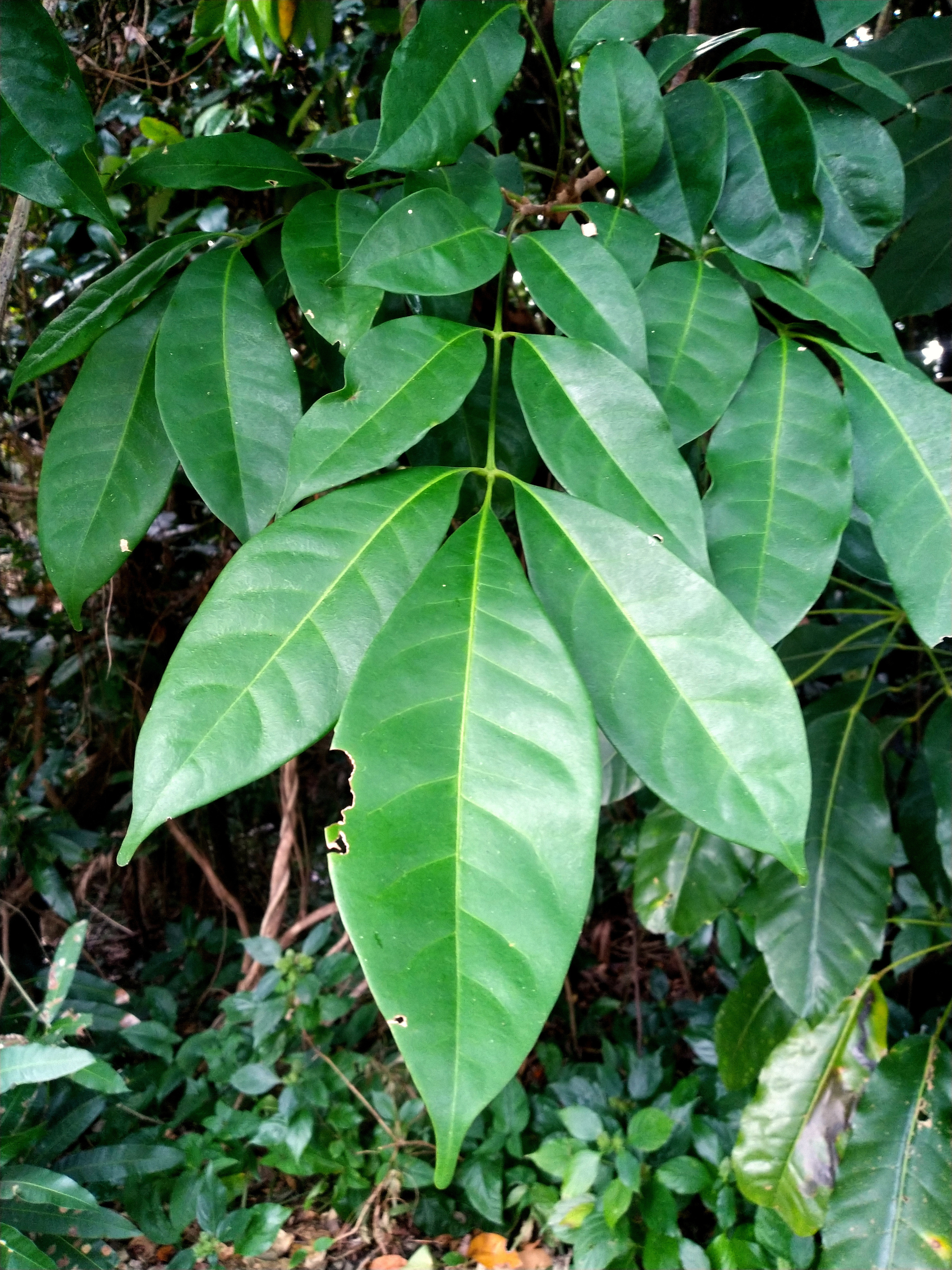
The compound leaf, upper surface

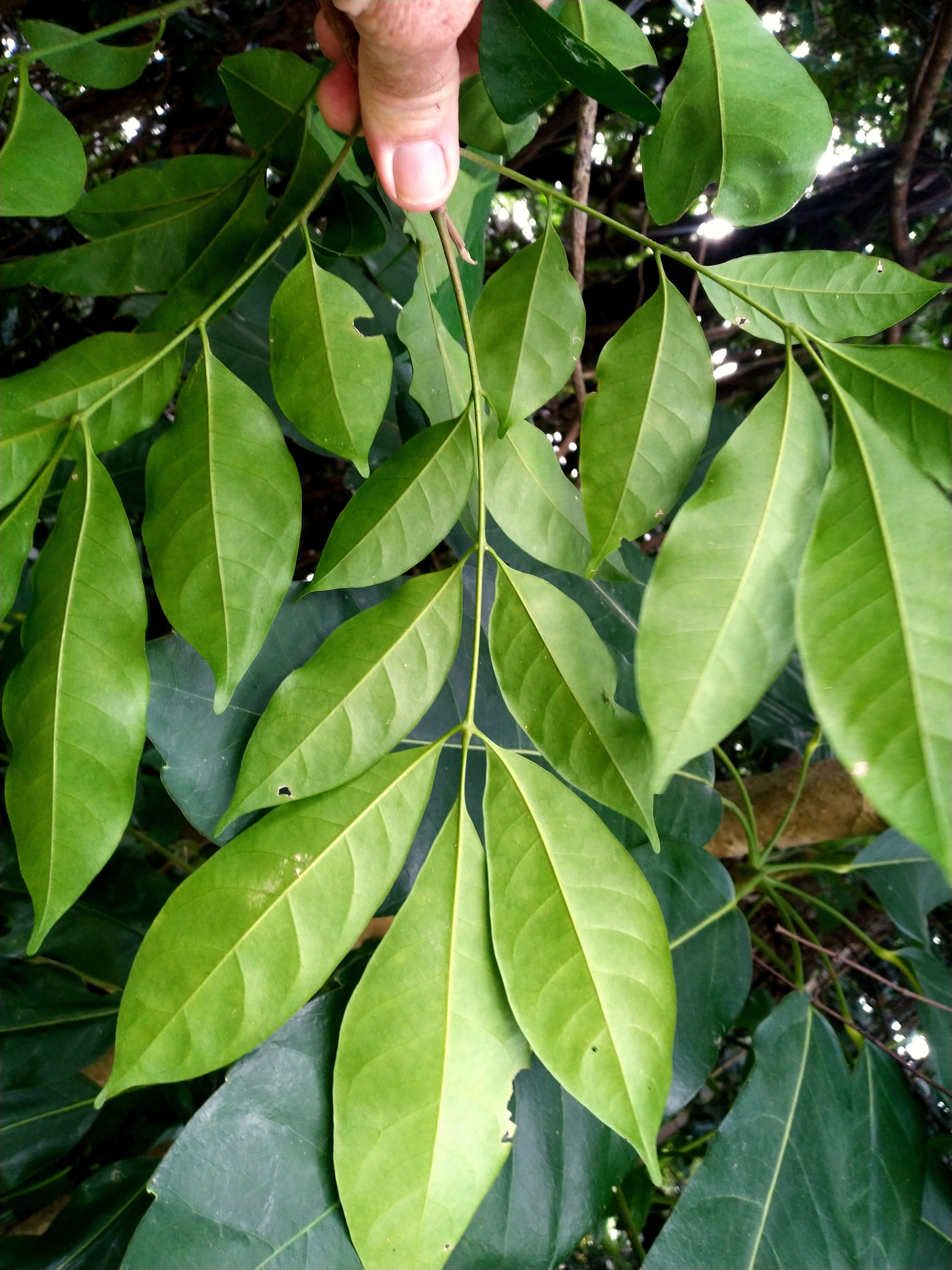
Leaf lower surface

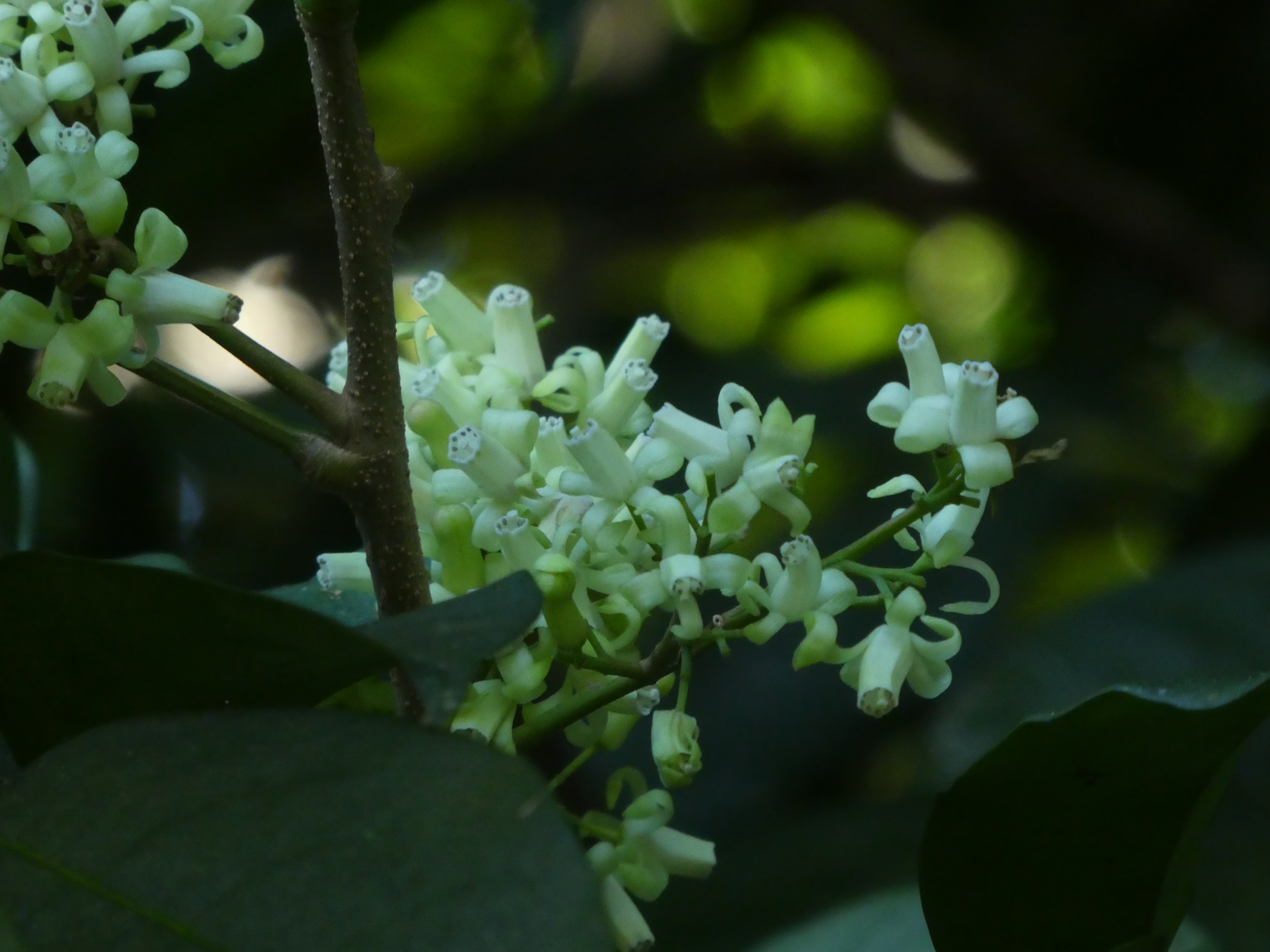
Flowers

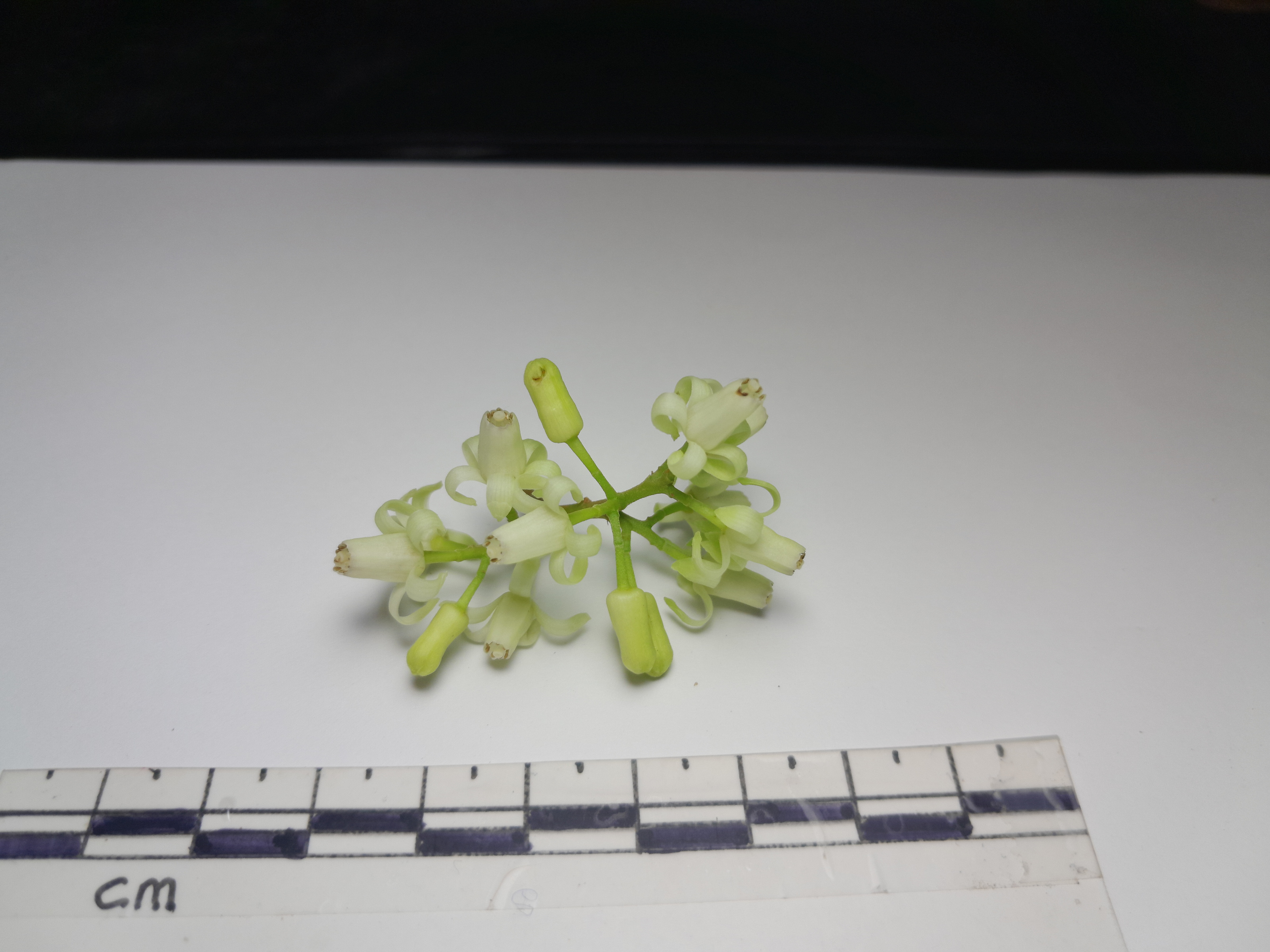
Flowers
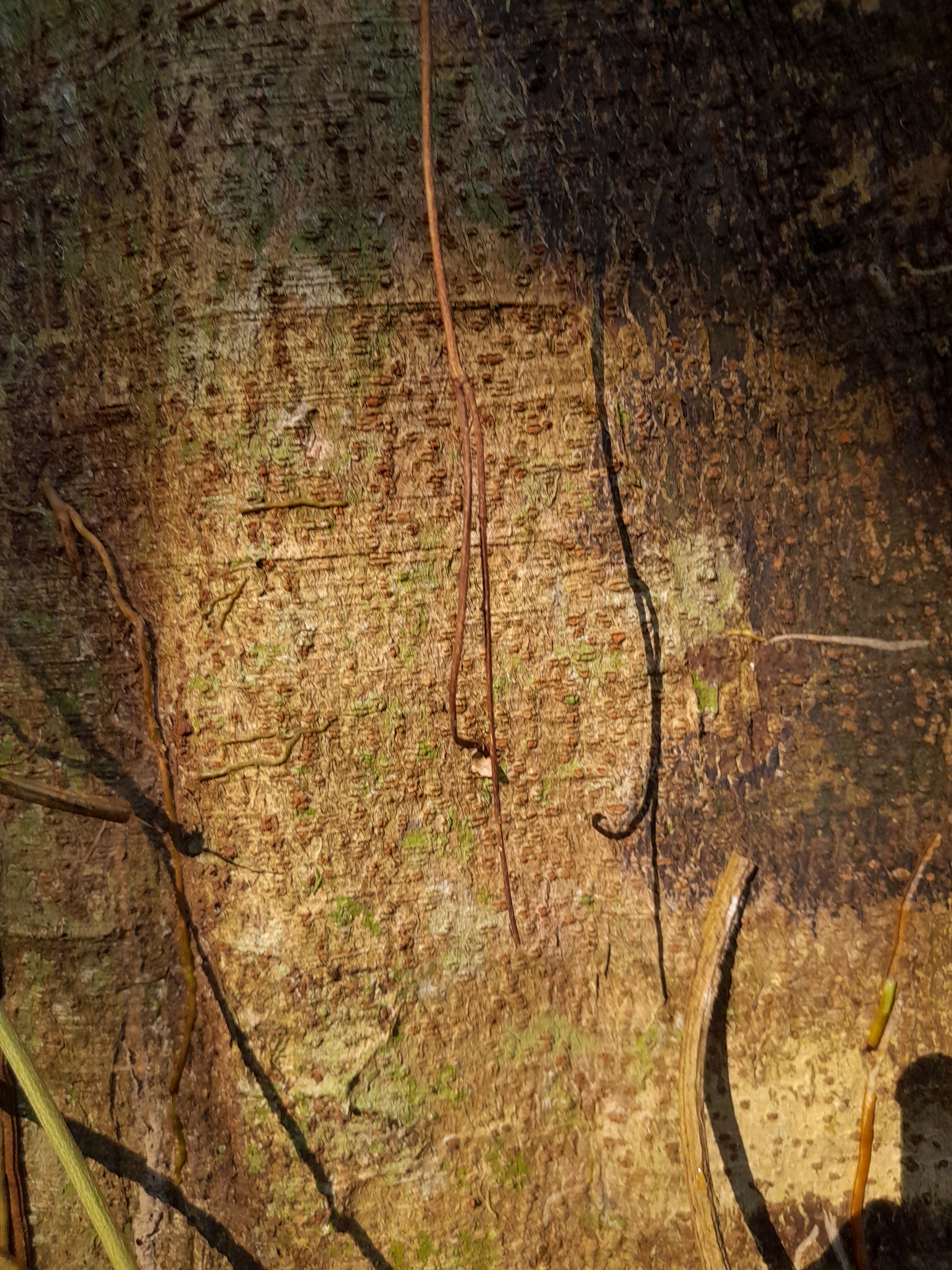
Trunk with lenticels

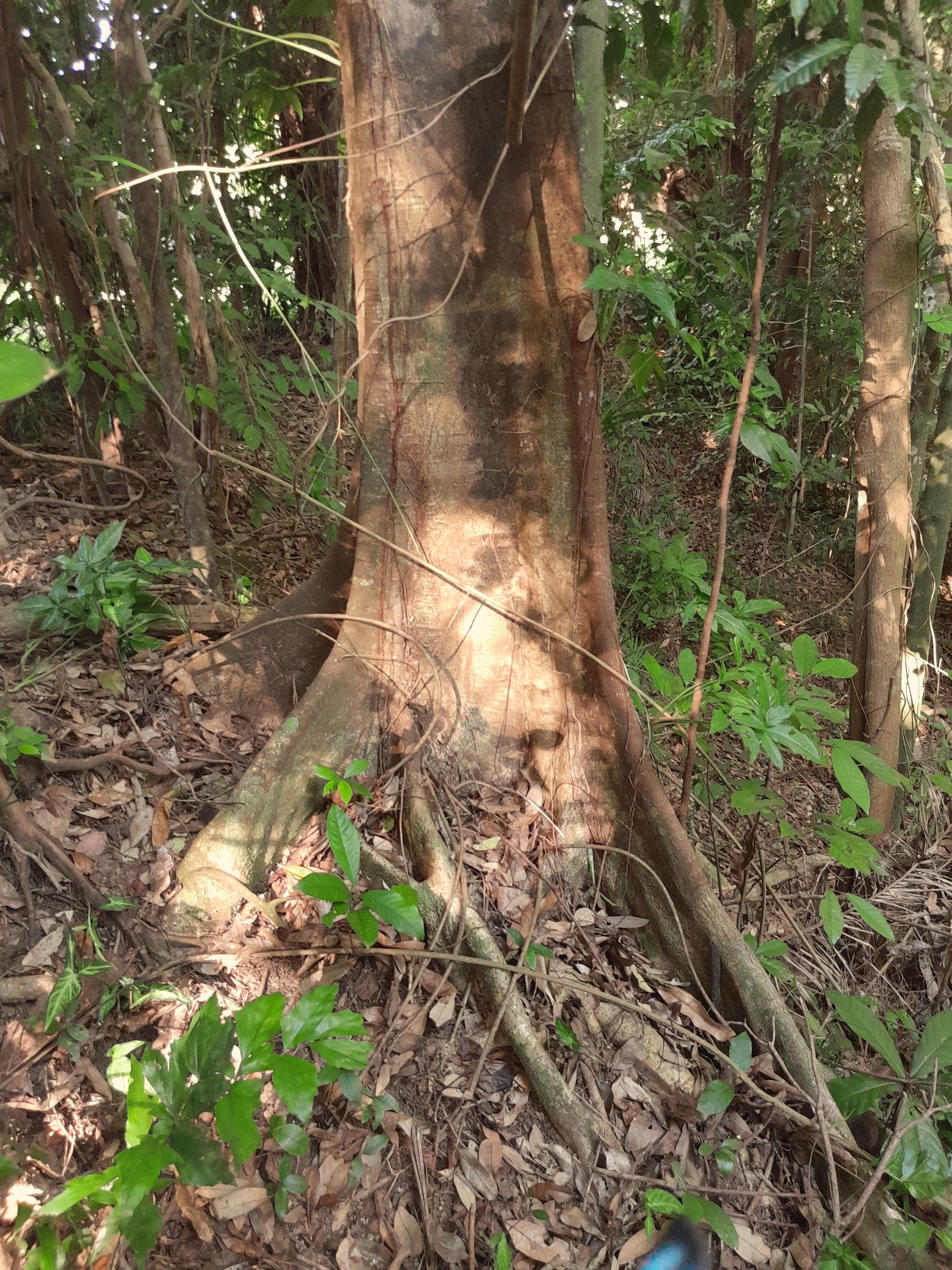
Buttress roots

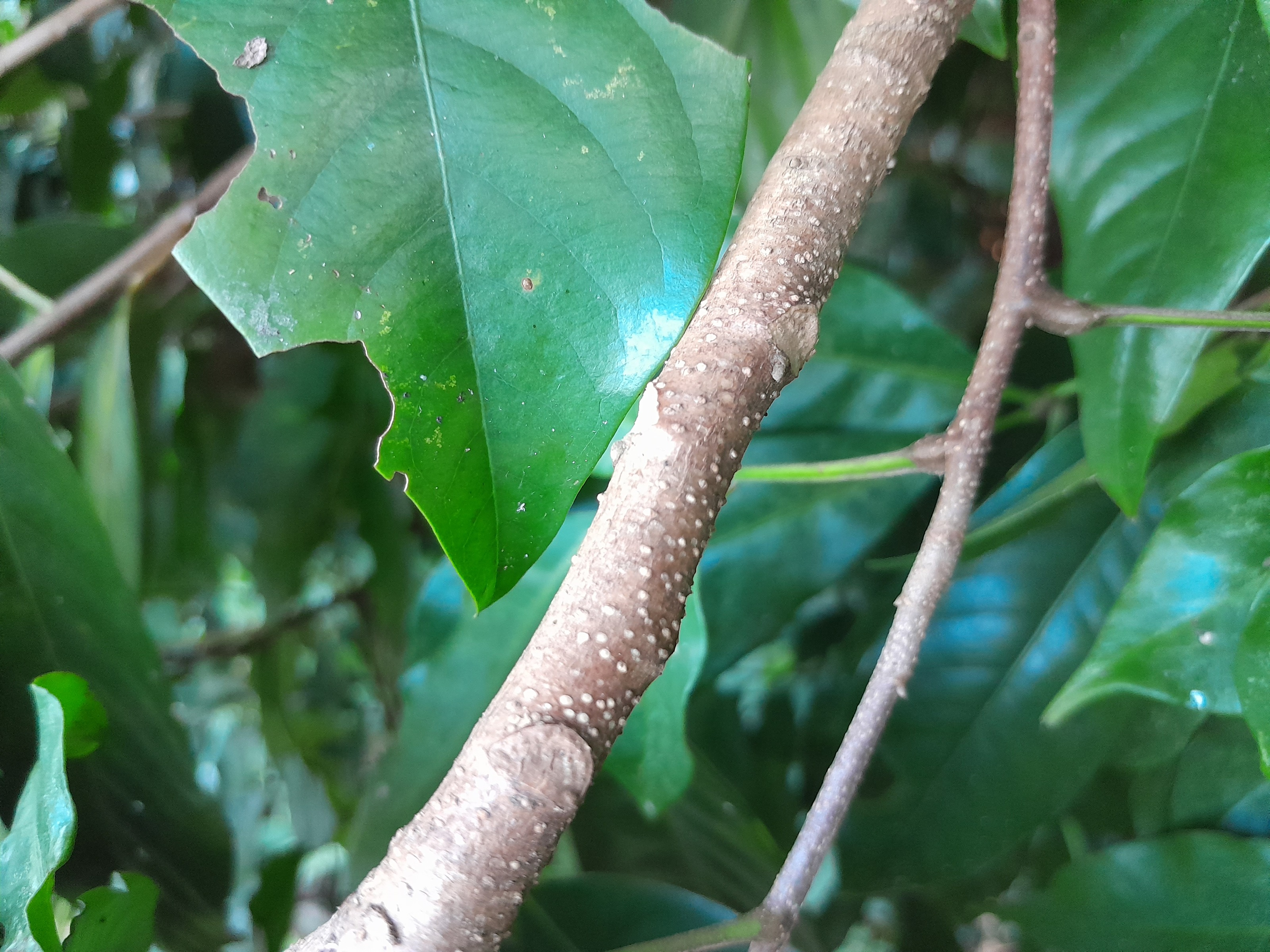
Twig with lenticels

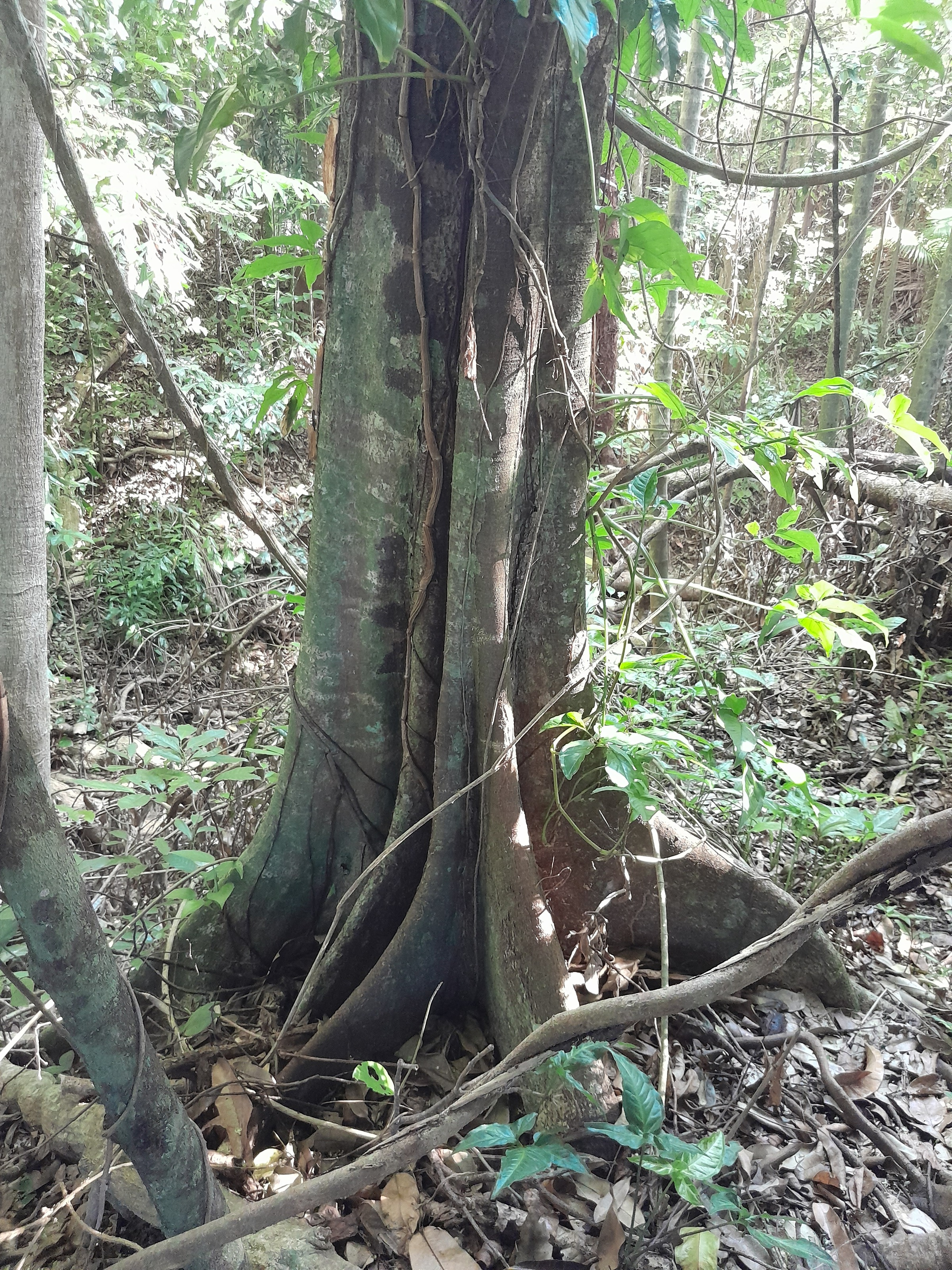
Fluted trunk
