= Prasoxylon excelsum =

Scientific classification
- Kingdom: Plantae
- Clade: Tracheophytes
- Clade: Angiosperms
- Clade: Eudicots
- Clade: Rosids
- Order: Sapindales
- Family: Meliaceae
- Genus: Prasoxylon
- Species: P. excelsum

Binomial name
- Prasoxylon excelsum (Spreng.) Mabb. (2021)

Synonyms
- List: Alliaria procera Kuntze (1891); Azedarach nigrum Noronha (1790), nom. nud.; Dysoxylum altissimum Merr. (1904); Dysoxylum arnoldianum K.Schum (1889); Dysoxylum excelsum (Spreng.) Blume ex G.Don (1831); Dysoxylum excelsum var. hasseltii Miq. (1868); Dysoxylum excelsum var. parvifolium Koord. & Valeton (1896); Dysoxylum excelsum var. pedicellatum Koord. & Valeton (1896); Dysoxylum gobara (Buch.-Ham.) Merr. (1942); Dysoxylum hasseltii (Miq.) Koord. & Valeton (1897); Dysoxylum havilandii Ridl. (1930); Dysoxylum hubertii Harms (1941); Dysoxylum macgregorii C.DC. (1903); Dysoxylum microbotrys King (1895); Dysoxylum motleyanum (C.DC.) Ridl. (1930); Dysoxylum pallidum Merr. (1914); Dysoxylum peerisiae Kosterm. (1982); Dysoxylum procerum Hiern (1875), nom. illeg.; Dysoxylum procerum var. integrum C.DC. (1878); Dysoxylum procerum var. macranthum C.DC. (1902); Dysoxylum procerum var. motleyanum C.DC. (1878); Dysoxylum turbinatum King (1895); Epicharis procera (Hiern) Pierre (1896), nom. illeg.; Guarea acuminata Wall. (1829), not validly publ.; Guarea disyphonia Griff. (1854); Guarea gobara Buch.-Ham. (1832); Guarea oblonga Wall. (1829), not validly publ.; Guarea procera Wall. (1829), not validly publ.; Hartighsea excelsa (Spreng.) A.Juss. (1830 publ. 1831); Hartighsea gobara Wight & Arn. ex Voigt (1845); Macrochiton excelsum (Spreng.) M.Roem. (1846); Trichilia excelsa Spreng. (1827)

Species of tree

Prasoxylon excelsum is a tree in the family Meliaceae. The specific epithet excelsum is from the Latin meaning 'tall'.

== Description ==
The tree grows up to 36 metres (120 ft) tall with a trunk diameter of up to 80 centimetres (31 in). The sweetly scented flowers are cream-coloured or pinkish white. The fruits are brown when ripe, roundish to pear-shaped and measure up to 5 cm (2 in) in diameter.

== Distribution and habitat ==
Prasoxylon excelsum is found in Sri Lanka, Nepal, northeast India, southern China, Indochina, and throughout Malesia and Papuasia. Its habitat is rain forest from sea-level to 1,000 metres (3,000 ft) elevation.
