= Ancient Rome: The Rise and Fall of an Empire =

British documentary drama television series

- BBC DVD Cover
- Genre: Docudrama
- Written by: Nick Murphy; James Wood; Jeremy Hylton Davies; Christopher Spencer; Andrew Grieve; Colin Heber-Percy; Lyall B. Watson
- Directed by: Nick Murphy; Nick Green; Christopher Spencer; Andrew Grieve; Tim Dunn; Arif Nurmohamed
- Starring: Sean Pertwee; Catherine McCormack; Michael Sheen; David Threlfall
- Narrated by: Alisdair Simpson
- Composer: Samuel Sim
- Country of origin: United Kingdom
- Original language: English
- No. of episodes: 6

Production
- Executive producer: Matthew Barrett
- Producer: Mark Hedgecoe
- Running time: 60 minutes

Original release
- Network: BBC One
- Release: 21 September – 26 October 2006

Related
- Heroes and Villains; Rome: Rise and fall of an empire

Ancient Rome: The Rise and Fall of an Empire is a 2006 BBC One docudrama series, with each episode looking at a different key turning point in the history of the Roman Republic and Empire.

== Production ==
Series Producer Mark Hedgecoe has stated that he made the series in response to previous films that "have tended to ignore the real history and chosen to fictionalise the story."

The series was filmed with the Panasonic SDX 900 DVCPRO50 professional camcorder in widescreen progressive scan mode at 25 frames/s. According to Mark Hedgecoe, a standard-definition format was chosen largely because it was more forgiving to focusing errors and required less light than high definition, thus speeding up the shooting. In his opinion, the camera delivered better footage than a Digital Betacam camera, and provided rich, filmic feel, which was well-suited to capturing the gritty reality of the Roman Empire.

The series was co-produced by BBC, ZDF and the Discovery Channel.

BBC History commissioned the online-game CDX to tie-in with the series.

== Reception ==
=== Reviews ===
Historical novelist Lindsey Davis writing in The Times points out that "the episodes were produced by different teams" and "it shows," stating episodes 3 and 4 work better than episodes 1, 2, and 5 and although she hasn't seen the final episode, she wants to watch it and she "can't say fairer than that." She compliments the producers who "avoid the talking-heads style, though they use literature and the advice of modern historians," but criticises the series in that "once they fill up with battle and crowd scenes, the formula of self-contained one-hour dramas doesn't give enough scope," and because "we don't see many women in this series." She concludes that "there is pleasing material here," stating, "the filming is good, the dialogue sounds real, the sets work, the military scenes will delight many," but she criticises the decision to not broadcast the episodes in chronological order as, "if they stick with their eccentric programming, we'll be jerked about maniacally," stating, "this is history on the Eric Morecambe principle: all of the moments – but not necessarily in the right order!"

Nancy Banks-Smith writing in The Guardian of episode one was complimentary of Michael Sheen's "storming performance" as Nero, adding that she found it "slightly disturbing" that he "reminded you subliminally of Tony Blair." She was however critical of the docudrama format of "spicy drama sandwiched between simple slices of narrative" which she compared to "watching a play with someone who insists on explaining the obvious," adding that she "got the impression that the narrator was not talking to me at all." Of episode two on Caesar she stated that "the historians have got their chilly mitts on," pointing out that it "was so painstakingly dull that Nero, always a crowd pleaser, had to be shown first."

Sam Wollaston writing in the same publication of episode three compared it to Rome postulating that this series "came about in response to all the mutterings from cross historians about factual inaccuracies in the BBC's grand romp last year." He states that "after some extensive research (I looked up Tiberius Gracchus on Wikipedia), I declare this one to be historically accurate, but also a grand bore." Highly critical of the docudrama format he states that "they never work, either as dramas or as documentaries," and goes on to explain that "there's no proper character development, and you don't care about any of them," before concluding that this "goes to show that sex is more fun than the truth."

=== Ratings ===
- Episode one (2006-09-21): 4.2 million viewers (21% audience share).
- Episode two (2006-09-28): 3.6 million viewers (17% audience share).
- Episode three (2006-10-05): 3.3 million viewers.
- Episode four (2006-10-12): 3.4 million viewers.
- Episode five (2006-10-19): 3.8 million viewers (17% audience share).
- Episode six (2006-10-26): 3 million viewers (13.6% audience share).

== Episodes ==
=== Episode one: Caesar ===
This is the story of the most famous Roman of them all, how he risked everything to tear down the government he served and bring revolution to Rome.

— Alisdair Simpson’s opening narration

At the close of the Gallic Wars, Gaius Julius Caesar finds his army encircled by a massive force of Gauls but wins a decisive victory with a brilliant counterattack at the Battle of Alesia. An inspiring speech to his troops, promising to rescue Rome from its corrupt rulers and restore it to its people, raises opposition from Senators Cato and Marcellus. Caesar refuses to disband his army before crossing the Rubicon, plunging the Republic into civil war and turning his deputy Labienus and old friend Pompey against him. Caesar captures Rome unopposed and Pompey is forced to withdraw to Greece with his allies in the senate.

Caesar seizes the emergency funds from the treasury to fund his campaign, but, failing to pay off his soldiers, is later forced to decimate his own rebellious Ninth Legion. Pompey amasses a huge army in Greece while Caesar leads a one-year campaign against opposition in Spain. In Greece, Caesar is forced to retreat inland by Pompey at the Battle of Dyrrachium but is victorious when the Senators force Pompey into an impetuous attack at the Battle of Pharsalus. Caesar overturns the Republic and has himself made dictator for life, only to be assassinated shortly into his rule.

==== Cast ====
- Mark Noble as Gaius Crastinus
- Simon Dutton as Titus Labienus
- Alex Ferns as Mark Antony
- Sean Pertwee as Caesar
- Crispin Redman as Cato
- Karl Johnson as Marcellus
- John Shrapnel as Pompey
- Biliana Petrinsky as Cornelia
- Douglas Reith as Lucius Metellus

==== Crew ====
- Historical consultant: Mary Beard
- Writers: James Wood & Jeremy Hylton Davies
- Producer and director: Nick Green

=== Episode two: Nero ===
This is the story of what happened when the most powerful man on Earth lost his mind and brought the Empire to the brink of destruction.

— Alisdair Simpson’s opening narration

Nero witnesses the Great Fire of Rome from his villa in Antium and hurries back to the capital to try to control the fire and save lives. Seneca tells him to "rule like the gods" and he vows to build an inspirational city of marble and stone on the ruins. The expense threatens to bankrupt the empire and Tigellinus is sent to rob the temples, turning many in the senate against the emperor. The Pisonian conspiracy to assassinate Nero and have Gaius Calpurnius Piso proclaimed as emperor is revealed, and the conspirators, including the trusted Seneca, are executed.

Nero inaugurates the biggest arts festival in Roman history with himself at the top of the bill. In the furious throes of increasing megalomania he kicks his wife Poppea to death. A now isolated Nero leaves Rome in the hands of the Senate as he sets out on a debauched tour of the empire. With his reconstruction still incomplete as the money runs out, Tigellinus is ordered to initiate a campaign of forced suicide to dispossess the richest men in the empire. A rebellion rises up and the Senate sentences the fleeing Nero to death, his suicide bringing the Julio-Claudian dynasty to an end.

==== Cast ====
- Michael Sheen as Nero
- Catherine McCormack as Poppea
- James Wilby as Tigellinus
- Ben Pullen as Rufus
- Hugh Ross as Senator Piso
- Michael Maloney as Senator Natalis
- David de Keyser as Senator Cluvius
- Trevor Cooper as Senator Scaevinus
- Hugh Dixon as Seneca
- Alex Lowe as Milichus
- Stewart Pelmut as Street Singer

==== Crew ====
- Historical consultant: Mary Beard
- Writer & director: Nick Murphy

=== Episode three: Rebellion ===
In the spring of AD 66 Josephus Ben Matitiyahu witnessed one of the greatest rebellions in the history of the Roman Empire.

— Alisdair Simpson’s opening narration

The First Jewish-Roman War begins when the Jews rise up against their corrupt governor, drive the Romans out of Judea and defeat a counter-attack at the Battle of Beth Horon. The future Emperor Titus is sent to recall his father Vespasian from exile in Greece to lead the legions against the rebels in Galilee. Josephus Ben Matityahu commands the resistance from the city of Jotapata, where many Jews take refuge from Vespasian's campaign of terror. Vespasian leads a three-week Siege of Jotapata and Josephus is captured. Joesephus predicts that Titus is destined to be emperor.

Jerusalem prepares for a final stand under the fanatical Yohanan of Giscala, who murders the more moderate Hanan and unites the rebel factions. Back in Rome the Empire is thrown into chaos when Nero is overthrown and the army turns to Vespasian to be their new Emperor. Titus accomplishes the Siege of Jerusalem by cutting off the city with an encircling wall. Yohanan ignores Josephus's pleas for surrender and leads subterranean attacks on Roman siege towers that undermine his own walls. Titus leads a bloody assault that massacres the rebels and razes the city.

==== Cast ====
- Ed Stoppard as Josephus
- Jonathan Coy as Florus
- Jonathan Hyde as Hanan
- Peter Firth as Vespasian
- Adam James as Titus
- Danny Midwinter as Placidus
- Tom Espiner as Yaakov
- Rod Hallett as Nicanor
- Richard Harrington as Yohanan

==== Crew ====
- Historical consultant: Martin Goodman
- Writer & director: Andrew Grieve

=== Episode four: Revolution ===
In an age before Rome was ruled by emperors young Tiberius Gracchus had been brought up to respect his father’s principles of honour and justice, but in just 20 years he will die defending his father’s ideals, murdered by the aristocrats standing behind him, his crime; starting a revolution so powerful it changed Rome forever, setting on the path to its greatest triumphs and worst excesses.

— Alisdair Simpson’s opening narration

Tiberius Sempronius Gracchus first makes a mark on history winning the golden crown from General Scipio Aemilianus by being first over the wall at the victorious Battle of Carthage. Back in Rome, now the "capital of the world", he finds the growing gap between rich and poor threatening the foundations of the republic. Urged to achieve greatness through further military exploits, he sets out with reinforcements for the campaign of General Gaius Hostilius Mancinus against the rebellious Numantine tribe in Spain but is defeated and forced to negotiate a peace treaty that the Senate later refuses to ratify.

His actions, while repudiated in the Senate, have made him a hero amongst the Roman people and his new father-in-law Senator Appius Claudius Pulcher supports him in a successful campaign to become their Tribune. He snubs the Senate and takes his proposed land reforms directly to the People's Assembly, where his old friend Octavius vetoes them. He brings the city to a standstill when he vetoes all other business in response and has Octavius deposed. Octavius and the Senate spread false rumours that he intends to make himself king and in the ensuing unrest he is murdered.

==== Cast ====
- James D'Arcy as Tiberius
- Greg Hicks as Aemillianus
- David Hinton as Axius
- Geraldine James as Cornelia
- Tom Bell as Nasica
- David Warner as Pulcher
- Wendy Nottingham as Mother
- James Hillier as Octavius
- Sylvester Morand as Mancinus
- Paul Brightwell as Pompeius
- David Kennedy as Matho

==== Crew ====
- Historical consultant: Mary Beard
- Producer, director & writer: Christopher Spencer

=== Episode five: Constantine ===
In the autumn of 312 AD Constantine’s army was camped 40 miles north of Rome. One of the two emperors in the west, Constantine was preparing for the decisive battle against his rival Maxentius. Travelling with Constantine were members of a growing new religion.

— Alisdair Simpson’s opening narration

In Rome, the tyrannical Maxentius consults the gods Jupiter, Apollo and Mars to be told that, the enemy of Rome will be defeated, while outside the city Lactantius tries to convince Constantine to convert to Christianity. Constantine initially dismisses Lactantius but, after seeing what appears to be a sign from the Christian god on the eve of the attack, he follows Lactantius' advice to adopt a Christian symbol. The two forces clash at the Battle of the Milvian Bridge, where Maxentius is drowned in the Tiber as a bridge collapses and the victorious Constantine rides into Rome under the Christian symbol.

Constantine creates an alliance by marrying his sister Constantia to the Eastern Emperor Licinius, and the two issue the Edict of Milan as a joint decree of religious tolerance. Constantine's rejection of the Pagan gods and funding of St. Peter's Church turns Licinius and the Senate against him. Senator Bassianus' failed assassination attempt on Constantine ignites a holy war between the eastern and the western empires. Constantine defeats his opponent at the Battle of Chrysopolis and the empire is united under the one Christian God at the Council of Nicea.

==== Cast ====
- David Threlfall as Constantine
- John Blakey as General Gnaeus
- John Woodvine as Lactantius
- Charles Dale as Maxentius
- Andrew Havill as Bassianus
- Paul Mooney as Priest
- Louise Delamere as Fausta
- Andrew Westfield as Bato
- Lyall B. Watson as Senator
- Danny Webb as Licinius
- Lucy Gaskell as Constantia
- Sophie Hunter as Sophronia

==== Crew ====
- Historical consultant: Averil Cameron
- Writers: Colin Heber-Percy & Lyall B. Watson
- Producer & director: Tim Dunn

=== Episode six: The Fall of Rome ===
At the start of the 5th century AD Rome was under siege, threatened by a vast army of Goths, forty-thousand of them were poised at the city’s gates. Rome was defenceless, even the remnants of its garrisons abandoned their posts. The events that brought Rome to the brink of disaster had their roots in a betrayal two years earlier.

— Alisdair Simpson’s opening narration

The Roman Empire is under barbarian assault from Huns and Vandals. Emperor Honorius's chief general and adviser Flavius Stilicho has negotiated a treaty with the Goth leaders Alaric and Athaulf, but the Emperor has him executed for conspiracy. Honorius orders Olympius to slaughter all Barbarian families within the Empire and the survivors flee to Alaric's camp. The Goths sweep through Italy to set siege to Rome, trapping the Emperor's sister Galla Placidia within. Senator Attalus rides to the Imperial capital at Ravenna and Honorius agrees to the Goths' demands.

The Goths withdraw but Honorius breaks the agreement, sending reinforcements to Rome that Athaulf intercepts and eliminates. Alaric speaks directly to the Senate and they elect Attalus as Emperor, but Honorius has Rome's grain supplies cut off and Attalus loses authority. Alaric travels to meet Honorius at Ravenna but is ambushed by his old rival Roman General Sarus, who is beaten into retreat. Alaric finally takes Rome, and captures Galla Placidia. Following Alaric's death, Athaulf marries Galla Placidia and his people finally settle in Southern France.

==== Cast ====
- Alastair Mackenzie as Athaulf
- Mark Lockyer as Alaric
- Colin Heber-Percy as Stilicho
- Paul Mooney as Emissary
- Sebastian Armesto as Honorius
- Pip Torrens as Olympius
- Sabina Netherclift as Goth Woman
- Andrew Westfield as Berig
- Philip Jackson as Jovius
- Natasha Barrero as Galla Placidia
- Lyall B. Watson as Petronius
- Simon Kunz as Attalus
- Ian Lindsay as Festus
- Karl Jenkinson as Sarus

==== Crew ====
- Historical consultant: Peter Heather
- Writer: James Wood
- Producer & director: Arif Nurmohamed

== Media information ==
=== DVD and video download release ===
- Released on Region 2 DVD by BBC Video on 2006-10-23.
- Released on Video Download by BBC Shop on 2007-05-30.

=== Companion book ===
- Baker, Simon (14 September 2006). Ancient Rome: The Rise and Fall of an Empire. BBC Books (hardcover). ISBN 978-0-563-49360-0.
- Baker, Simon (7 June 2007). Ancient Rome: The Rise and Fall of an Empire. BBC Books (paperback). ISBN 978-1-84607-284-0.

== Notes ==
- When the series was broadcast on the Discovery Channel as Battle for Rome, from 5 November 2006 onwards, the episodes were broadcast in their chronological order (i.e. Gracchus, then Caesar, then Nero, then as BBC order).
