= Acilia gens =

Ancient Roman family

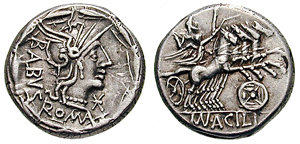
Denarius of Manius Acilius Balbus, 125 BC.

The gens Acilia was a plebeian family at ancient Rome, that flourished from the middle of the third century BC until at least the fifth century AD, a period of seven hundred years. The first of the gens to achieve prominence was Gaius Acilius, who was quaestor in 203 and tribune of the plebs in 197 BC.

== Praenomina ==
The Acilii were particularly fond of the praenomen Manius, which they used more than any other. They also used the names Gaius, Lucius, Caeso, and Marcus.

== Branches and cognomina ==
The three main branches of the Acilii bore the cognomina Aviola, Balbus, and Glabrio.

The Glabriones were the first family to appear in history, and they continued the longest. Members of this family have been identified from the third century BC into the fifth century AD, a span of time that no other Roman family can be proved to have bridged. According to Millar, "[t]he one indubitable case of continuity from the republic to the fourth century is the Acilii Glabriones." They were certainly plebeian, as many of them were tribunes of the plebs. They also had a garden, the Horti Aciliorum, on the Pincian Hill in the 2nd century. A tomb of the Acilii Glabriones was found in Rome in 1888. The surname Glabrio is derived from the adjective glaber, "smooth", and probably referred to someone who was bald. Dondin-Payre suggests that, interpreted as "hairless" or "depilated", Glabrio had the further connotation of "effeminate".

The Acilii Balbi, like the Glabriones, were definitely plebeian. The surname Balbus was quite common at Rome, and originally given to one who stammered. A coin of this family depicts the head of Pallas within a laurel wreath on the obverse, and on the reverse, a quadriga bearing Jupiter and Victoria.

The Acilii Aviolae appear at the very end of the Republic, or under the early emperors. There is some confusion between them and the Glabriones, with the consul of 33 BC being identified as Marcus Acilius Glabrio in some writers, and Manius Acilius Aviola in others. Given the antiquity of the Glabriones, it seems likely that one of them was the ancestor of the Aviolae, and might have used both surnames at various points in time. As for the name Aviola, it seems to be a diminutive, presumably of avia, "grandmother".

== Members ==
This list includes abbreviated praenomina. For an explanation of this practice, see filiation.

=== Acilii Glabriones ===
- Lucius Acilius, grandfather of the consul of 191 BC.
- Gaius Acilius L. f., father of the consul of 191 BC.
- Manius Acilius C. f. L. n. Glabrio, consul in 191 BC, carried on the War against Antiochus with considerable success, earning a triumph. He was a candidate for the censorship in 189, but the opposition of the Roman aristocracy and rumours that he had appropriated the spoils of war compelled him to retire.
- Manius Acilius M'. f. C. n. Glabrio, as a young man in 181 BC, dedicated the temple of Pietas that has been vowed by his father during the War against Antiochus. He was curule aedile in 166, and celebrated the Megalensian Games. In 154, Glabrio was elected consul suffectus in the place of Lucius Postumius Albinus, who had died.
- Manius Acilius M'. f. Glabrio, tribune of the plebs in 122 BC, and author of the lex Acilia de Repetundis.
- Manius Acilius M'. f. M'. n. Glabrio, presided over the impeachment of Verres while praetor urbanus circa 70 BC. He was consul in 67 BC, and subsequently had the conduct of the Third Mithridatic War, where his inaction and missteps greatly strengthened Mithridates' position, and was replaced by Gnaeus Pompeius Magnus.
- Marcus Acilius M'. f. Glabrio, (Note: Named as Manius Acilius Aviola in some sources.) consul suffectus ex Kal. Jul. in 33 BC.
- Marcus Acilius Memmius Glabrio, a Roman senator during the time of Tiberius, served as curator of the banks and channels of the Tiber. He possibly could be the son or grandson of Manius Acilius Glabrio, consul in 33 BC; or perhaps the natural son of one of the Memmii who was adopted into the Acilii Glabriones.
- Acilius Glabrio, consul suffectus during the reign of Nero, was the father of Manius Acilius Glabrio, consul in AD 91.
- Manius Acilius Glabrio, consul in AD 91, with the future emperor Trajan. Glabrio endeavoured to gain the favour of Domitian through feats of courage, but was instead banished, and subsequently put to death by the emperor.
- Manius Acilius M'. f. Glabrio, consul in AD 124.
- Manius Acilius M'. f. M'. n. Glabrio Gnaeus Cornelius Severus, consul in AD 152. He had been a military tribune with the fifteenth legion, legate of Crete and Cyrenaica, legate of Africa, quaestor, and praetor.
- Manius Acilius M'. f. M'. n. Glabrio, son of M'. Acilius Glabrio Gnaeus Cornelius Severus, consul suffectus around AD 173, and consul ordinarius in 186.
- Marcus Acilius M'. f. M'. n. Faustinus, consul in AD 210.
- Acilia M'. f. M'. n. Maniola, daughter of the consul of 210.
- Marcus Acilius Glabrio, consul in AD 256.
- (Claudius) Acilius Ti. f. Cleobulus, praeses of Syria Palestina from AD 276 to 282, was a great-grandson of Manius Acilius Glabrio, the consul of 186.
- Acilia Gavinia Frestana, daughter of Cleobulus, and granddaughter of Manius Acilius Faustinus, the consul of AD 210.
- Acilius Glabrio, a grammarian at Burdigala during the third century.
- Acilius Glabrio, named in a list of senators who contributed 400,000 sesterces for the construction of a building, c. 291 AD.
- Acilius Glabrio Sibidius signo Spedius, legate in the province of Achaia, governor of Campania, and vicar of Gaul. Father of Glabrio Faustus.
- Anicius Acilius Glabrio Faustus, thrice praefectus urbi of Rome, consul in AD 438, and praetorian prefect of Italy in 442.
- Rufius Achilius Maecius Placidus, a grandson of Anicius Glabrio Faustus, was consul in AD 481.
- Anicius Acilius Aginantius Faustus, another grandson of Anicius Faustus, was consul in AD 483.
- Rufius Achilius Sividius, another grandson of Anicius Faustus, was consul in AD 488.

=== Acilii Balbi ===
- Manius Acilius L. f. K. n. Balbus, consul in 150 BC.
- Manius Acilius M. f. L. n. Balbus, consul in 114 BC.

=== Acilii Aviolae ===
- Acilius Aviola, legate in Gallia Lugdunensis under Tiberius in AD 21, he quashed a rebellion of the Andecavi and Turonii. He might be the same person as Gaius Calpurnius Aviola, consul suffectus in AD 24, and the same Aviola whose tragic death is related by Pliny the Elder and Valerius Maximus. (Note: This Aviola, a man of consular rank, is said to have come to life again on his funeral pyre, but due to the violence of the flames, he could not be rescued, and burned to death. This must have occurred prior to the death of Tiberius, in AD 37, since Valerius Maximus published his work during that emperor's reign, but none of the Acilii Aviolae are known to have held the consulship this early. This discrepancy would be resolved if the Aviola in question were Gaius Calpurnius Aviola, who had been consul; or if he were the Marcus Acilius Glabrio who was consul in 33 BC, who is referred to as Aviola in some sources.)
- Manius Acilius C. f. Aviola, consul in AD 54, and proconsul of Asia from 65 to 66.
- Manius Acilius Aviola, consul suffectus in AD 82.
- Manius Acilius Aviola, consul in AD 122.
- Manius Acilius Aviola, consul in AD 239.
- Manius Acillius Aviola, child at the meeting of the Arval Brethren

=== Others ===
- Gaius Acilius, quaestor in 203 and tribune of the plebs in 197 BC. He proposed the establishment of five colonies to repopulate coastal areas that had been deserted during the Second Punic War. As an old man in 155, he served as interpreter to a delegation of Greek envoys, and he wrote a history of Rome, which is now lost.
- Marcus Acilius Caninus, one of Caesar's lieutenants during the Civil War, and proconsul of Sicily during the African War. He is probably the Acilius whom Cicero on two occasions defended.
- Acilius Buta, a man of praetorian rank, who lived during the time of Tiberius, is said by Seneca the Younger to have squandered a vast inheritance.
- Acilius Sthenelus, a freedman who became famous for his skill with viniculture.
- Acilia, the wife of Marcus Annaeus Mela, and mother of the poet Lucan.
- Acilius Lucanus, a notable lawyer at Corduba in the province of Hispania Baetica.
- Lucius Acilius Strabo, consul suffectus in AD 80.
- Publius Acilius, the uncle of Publius Minicius Acilianus.
- Marcus Acilius Priscus Egrilius Plarianus, served in uncertain years as curator of the roads, military tribune in the fifth legion, quaestor, plebeian aedile, proconsular legate of Sicily and Asia, proconsul of Gallia Narbonensis, and legate of the eighth legion.
- Manius Acilius Rufus, consul suffectus ex Kal. Jul. in AD 102.
- Lucius Acilius L. f. Rufus, a native of Thermis Himeraeis, served as tribune of the plebs, praetor, and was consul suffectus in AD 107.
- Lucius Acilius Strabo Clodius Nummus, governor of Numidia from AD 114 to 116.
- Publius Acilius Attianus, guardian of the young Hadrian, under whom he later served as praetorian prefect.
- Gaius Acilius Priscus, consul in AD 132.
- Marcus Acilius Vibius Faustinus, one of the Salii Palatini, who left the priestly college in AD 170.
- Acilius Severus, one of the sons of the senators chosen to serve the Arvales in AD 183.
- Quintus Acilius C. f. Fuscus, a native of Thibursicum Bure in Africa Proconsularis, held a number of minor posts at Rome at the time of the emperor Geta and thereafter.
- (Acilius) Aureolus, an officer who became a usurper during the reign of Gallienus.
- Acilius Severus, consul in AD 323, and prefect of Rome from 325 to 326.
- Acilius Severus, a Christian writer of the mid-fourth century.

== See also ==
- List of Roman gentes
- Lex Acilia de Intercalando (191 BC)
- Lex Acilia Repetundarum (123 BC)
- Lex Acilia Calpurnia (67 BC)
