= Epicharis =

Epicharis may be:

- Epicharis, a 1665 tragedy by Daniel Casper von Lohenstein with an eponymous heroine
- Epicharis (plant), a genus of trees in family Meliaceae
- Epicharis (bee), a bee genus
- Epicharis (martyr), 3rd or 4th century Christian martyrs
- Epicharis (Pisonian conspirator), member of the Pisonian conspiracy
