= Scavenger's daughter =

16th-century torture device

The Scavenger's daughter, also known as the Skevington's gyves, iron shackle, stork, or Spanish A-frame was a type of torture device invented in England during the reign of King Henry VIII.

== History ==
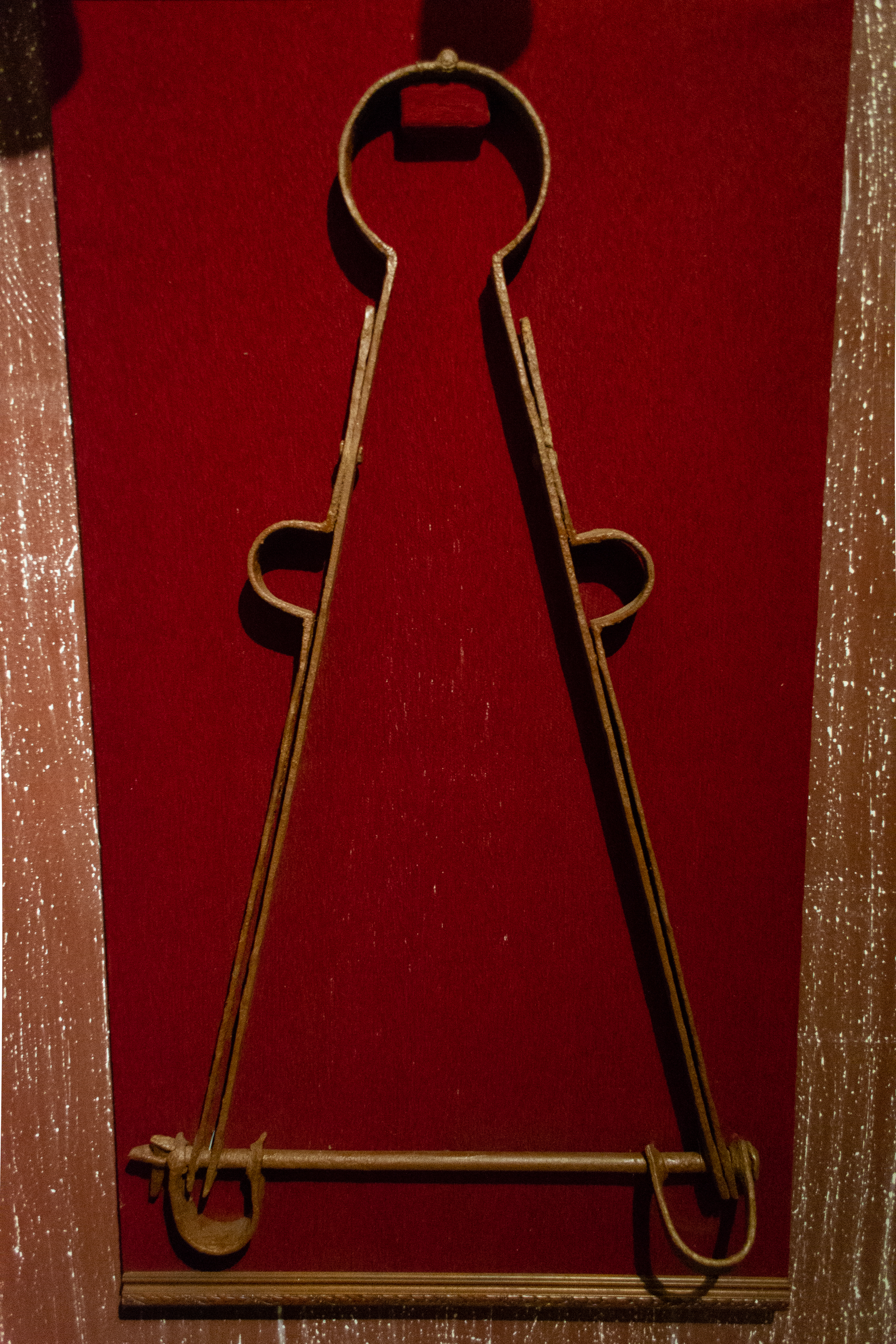
Scavenger's daughter. Inquisition Exhibition at the Palacio de los Olvidados in Granada.

The Scavenger's Daughter (or Skevington's Daughter) was invented as an instrument of torture in the reign of Henry VIII by Sir Leonard Skevington, Lieutenant of the Tower of London, a son of Sir William Skeffington (died 1535), Lord Deputy of Ireland, and of his second wife, Ann Digby. The device consisted of a metal rack shaped into an A-frame; the victim's head was strapped to the top point of the A, the hands at the midpoint, and the legs at the lower spread ends. The frame could fold, swinging the head down and forcing the knees up into a sitting position, compressing the body so as to force blood from the nose and ears.

The Scavenger's Daughter was conceived as the perfect complement to the Duke of Exeter's daughter (the rack) because it worked according to the opposite principle - by compressing the body rather than stretching it.

The best-documented use is that on the Irishman Thomas Miagh, charged with being in contact with rebels in Ireland. It may be in connection with the Scavenger's Daughter that Miagh carved on the wall of the Beauchamp Tower in the Tower of London, "By torture straynge my truth was tried, yet of my libertie denied. 1581. Thomas Miagh."

Another victim of the Scavenger's Daughter was Thomas Cottam, an English Catholic priest and martyr from Lancashire, who suffered it twice in the 1580s before being released. Cottam was executed in 1582 during the reign (1558-1603) of Henry's daughter, Elizabeth I. Likewise, on 10 December 1580, the priest Luke Kirby was subjected to it.

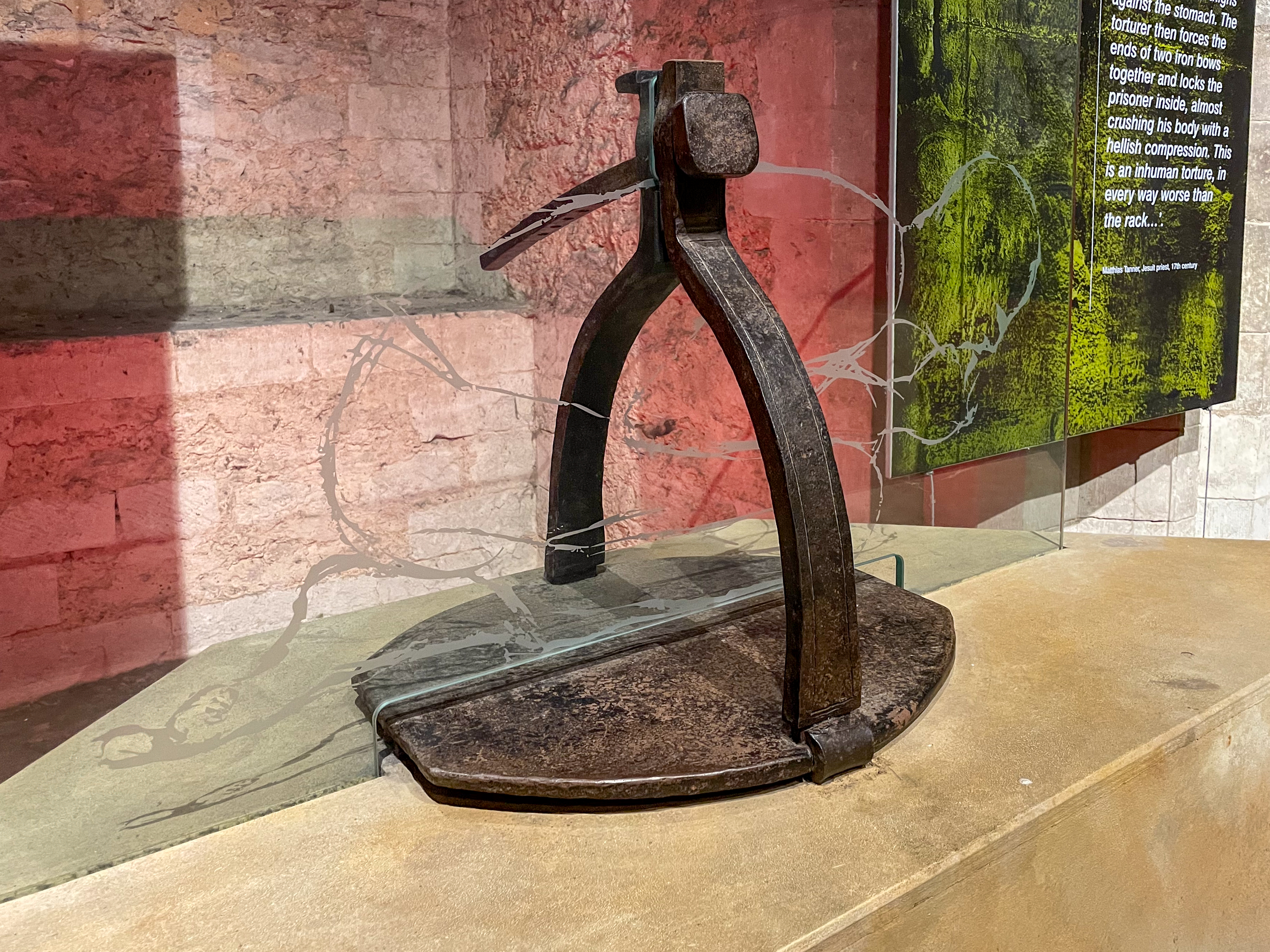
Scavenger's daughter at the Tower of London

The Scavenger's Daughter is also known as Skevington's gyves, as iron shackle, as the Stork (as in Italian cicogna) or as the Spanish A-frame. Further it is known as Skevington's daughter, from which the more commonly known folk etymology using "Scavenger" is derived. There is a Scavenger's daughter on display in the Tower of London museum.

== See also ==
- Captain's daughter, referring to the naval Cat o' nine tails

== Sources ==
- Encyclopædia Britannica Eleventh Edition, "Duke of Exeter's Daughter".
