= Thomas Cottam =

English Catholic priest and martyr

Blessed Thomas Cottam S.J.
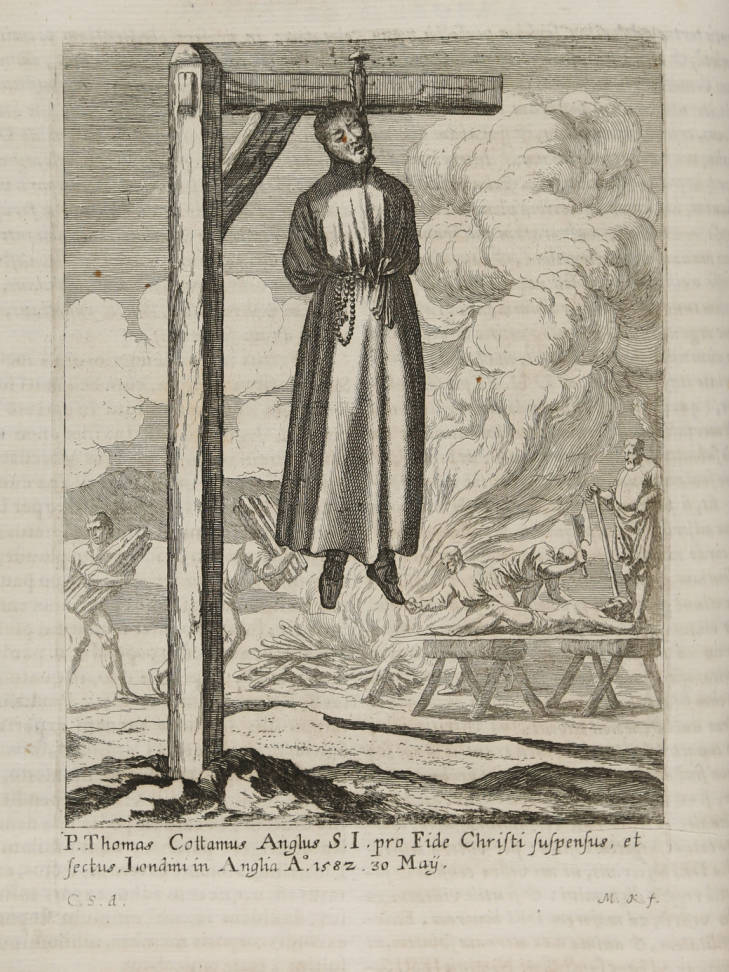
- The hanging of Thomas Cottam on 30 May 1582
- Born: c. 1549
- Died: 30 May 1582 (aged 32–33); Tyburn, London, England
- Beatified: 29 December 1886 by Pope Leo XIII
- Feast: 30 May

Thomas Cottam (1549 – 30 May 1582) was an English Catholic priest from Lancashire who was executed during the reign of Elizabeth I. He was a member of the Jesuit order.

== Life ==
Cottam was born to Protestant parents, Laurence Cottam of Dilworth and his wife Anne née Brewer. Thomas studied at Brasenose College, Oxford, and received his M.A. on 14 July 1572 after which he left for London, where he became master of a grammar school. It was there that he met Thomas Pounde and was converted to Catholicism. This led to Cottam's decision to head to Douai to become a priest.

He was ordained a deacon at Cambrai in December 1577 and, desiring to become a missionary to India, travelled to Rome and was received as a Jesuit novice at Sant' Andrea in the city on 8 April 1579. That October he came down with a fever and was sent north to Lyons to recuperate. The spy Charles Sledd had been in Rome, and traveling with some Englishmen arrived in Lyon, where he made the acquaintance of Cottam. Discovering that Cottam intended to proceed to England, he made careful note of Cottam's appearance and particulars and continuing on to Paris passed the information to the English ambassador.

From there Cottam went to the English College, Rheims, considering himself accepted for India, if his health improved after a visit to England. He was ordained around 28 May 1580, at Soissons and left on 5 June with four companions for England. Betrayed by Sledd, he was immediately arrested at Dover. Through a ruse worked by Dr.Humphrey Ely, one of his fellow travellers, Cottam reached London safely; however, the good deed put Ely at risk, and Cottam voluntarily surrendered himself.

He was initially committed "close prisoner" to the Marshalsea, where it is thought he said his first Mass. After being tortured, he was moved on 4 December 1580 to the Tower, where he endured the rack and the scavenger's daughter (twice). Cottam was arraigned with Edmund Campion and others and on 16 November 1581, he was sentenced to death. His execution was deferred until 30 May 1582, when he was executed at Tyburn.

== See also ==
- Douai Martyrs
