= Marcus Annaeus Mela =

Marcus Annaeus Mela (c. 1 AD – c. AD 66) was a member of the Annaea gens and the youngest son of Seneca the Elder and a brother to Seneca the Younger. He was born in Cordoba in Roman Spain. He studied rhetoric with good success but never took high positions in the court of Nero unlike his brother. He married Acilia, daughter of Acilius Lucanus of Corduba, a provincial lawyer of some renown. With Acilia he had at least one son, Marcus Annaeus Lucanus in 39 AD. He was proscribed to commit suicide in 66 AD due to his supposed connection to the Pisonian conspiracy.
