= Annaea gens =

Ancient Roman family

The gens Annaea was a plebeian family at Rome during the first century BC, and the early centuries of the Empire. Members of this gens were distinguished for their love of literary pursuits. Several members of the family fell victim to the various plots and intrigues of the court of Nero, including the conspiracy of Gaius Calpurnius Piso.

== Origin ==
Lucius Annaeus Seneca, the first of the gens of whom we have definite knowledge, was a native of Corduba in the province of Hispania Ulterior. However, his name and those of his descendants are clearly of Roman character, arguing that the family was descended from Roman colonists, and not native to Spain. Chase classifies the nomen among those originally derived from names ending in -aes, chiefly of Umbrian or Paelignian origin. The Paeligni were an Oscan people of central Italy. The Umbrians spoke a separate, but closely related language. Statius Annaeus, a friend of the family at Rome, may well have been a kinsman, and his praenomen supports the theory that the Annaei were of Oscan or Umbrian origin.

== Praenomina ==
The only praenomina associated with the Annaei are Lucius, Marcus, Gaius, and Statius. The three former were the most common Latin praenomina, while Statius was generally associated with foreigners, slaves, and freedmen at Rome. Since nothing is known of the physician Statius Annaeus' origin, it is possible that he was a freedman, and that Statius was not regularly used by the family. However, if the Annaei were of Oscan or Umbrian origin, Statius may have been a family name.

== Branches and cognomina ==
The Annaei do not appear to have had any distinct branches, but, following a trend which occurred throughout imperial times, each child of the elder Seneca bore a different cognomen, including the surnames Novatus, Seneca, and Mela or Mella. Annaeus Mela's son received the cognomen Lucanus, in honor of his grandfather, Anicius Lucanus, a prominent lawyer at Corduba. This surname originally referred to a native of Lucania. A freedman of the Annaei bore the cognomen Cornutus. The surname Florus, "shining", was used by a second-century poet, and perhaps also a historian of the same period, although whether he was actually a member of this gens is uncertain.

== Members ==
This list includes abbreviated praenomina. For an explanation of this practice, see filiation.

- Gaius Annaeus C. f. Brocchus, a senator in 73 BC, had probably been aedile. He was a victim of Symmachus, one of the Venerii, a new class of publicani instituted by Verres.
- Lucius Annaeus Seneca, a rhetorician and native of Corduba in Hispania Ulterior, known as Seneca the Elder.
- Marcus Annaeus L. f. Novatus, afterward called Lucius Junius Gallio Annaeanus, the eldest son of Lucius Annaeus Seneca, and a rhetorician.
- Lucius Annaeus L. f. Seneca, the second son of Lucius Annaeus Seneca, and a philosopher, known as Seneca the Younger.
- Statius Annaeus, a friend of the younger Seneca, and a physician who assisted Seneca in two attempts to commit suicide.
- Marcus Annaeus L. f. Mela, the youngest son of the elder Lucius Annaeus Seneca, and father of the poet Marcus Annaeus Lucanus.
- Marcus Annaeus M. f. Longinus, a maccus (an actor in Atellan farces or clown), first century.
- Marcus Annaeus M. f. L. n. Lucanus, son of Marcus Annaeus Mela, and a celebrated poet in the time of Nero.
- Lucius Annaeus Cornutus, a freedman and notable commentator on Aristotle, exiled by the emperor Nero in AD 68.
- Lucius Annaeus Florus, one of several names assigned to the author of a history of Rome, from the founding of the city to the time of Augustus.
- Annaeus Florus, a poet who flourished during the time of the emperor Hadrian.
- Marcus Annaeus Syriacus, governor of Egypt from AD 161 to 164.

== See also ==
- List of Roman gentes

== Bibliography ==
- Marcus Tullius Cicero, In Verrem.
- Publius Cornelius Tacitus, Annales.
- Dictionary of Greek and Roman Biography and Mythology, William Smith, ed., Little, Brown and Company, Boston (1849).
- Wilhelm Dittenberger, Sylloge Inscriptionum Graecarum (Collection of Greek Inscriptions, abbreviated SIG), Leipzig (1883).
- George Davis Chase, "The Origin of Roman Praenomina", in Harvard Studies in Classical Philology, vol. VIII (1897).
- Guido Bastianini, "Lista dei prefetti d'Egitto dal 30^{a} al 299^{p}" (List of the Prefects of Egypt from 30 BC to AD 299), in Zeitschrift für Papyrologie und Epigraphik, vol. 17 (1975).
