= Lex Acilia de Intercalando =

Ancient Roman law relating to the calendar

The Lex Acilia de intercalando (Latin for "The Acilian Law on Intercalating") was a Roman law introduced by the consul M'. Acilius Glabrio and enacted in 191 BC. Its content is unclear, but it dealt with intercalation in the Roman calendar.

== Context ==
The state of the Roman calendar during this period is uncertain. Roman mythology traced the Republican calendar of 355 days to Numa, the city's second king, and also credited him with the establishment of some kind of intercalation to keep it aligned with the solar year. Some authors even credited him with use of the 19-year Metonic cycle. There is evidence, however, that the Romans long continued their early and unattested lunar calendar even after the establishment of the Republic. Varro cites instances of intercalation at least as early as the 5th century BC. Alternatively, intercalation is sometimes said to have begun with the decemviri, who may have adopted either Etruscan or Greek practices. Fulvius claims the Acilian Law was the first to authorize any intercalation.

The calendar seems to have been greatly out of sync with the seasons during this period, probably in part due to the exigencies of the Second Punic War. Two astronomical events dated by Livy show the Roman calendar was 4 months out of alignment with its Julian counterpart in 190 BC, the year after the reform, and only two months out of alignment by 168 BC.

== Contents ==
The details of the law are uncertain, but it seems to have placed the decision whether or not to intercalate a month into the year with the College of Pontiffs.

== See also ==
- Roman Law and List of Roman laws
- Gens Acilia
- Roman calendar
