= Sulpicius Asper =

Ancient Roman centurion and conspirator against Nero

Sulpicius Asper was a centurion of ancient Rome who lived in the 1st century CE, and was one of the bodyguards of the Roman emperor Nero.

Asper was one of the central figures in the Pisonian conspiracy against Nero's life in 66 CE. The conspiracy was detected before it could put its plan in motion, and Asper was arrested. When Nero asked him why he conspired to kill him, Asper replied "There was no other remedy for your atrocities" (according to Tacitus) or "I couldn't help you any other way" (according to Cassius Dio). Asper was shortly thereafter beheaded with his co-consiprators, a death which Asper is said to have faced "with fortitude".

The historian Tacitus provides the names of at least 20 people involved with this conspiracy, but scholars suggest the conspiracy was largely driven by senior Praetorian guard officers like Asper. Tacitus himself calls Asper, along with Subrius Flavus, the "most committed" among the conspirators, and suggests they instigated the entire thing.
