= Gaius Albucius Silus =

1st century Roman orator

- Born: Novaria (modern Novara)
- Died: Novaria (modern Novara)
- Occupation(s): Orator, Rhetoric teacher
- Era: 1st century BC / 1st century AD
- Known for: Renowned declaimer and teacher under Emperor Augustus
- Notable work: Declamations (as referenced by Seneca the Elder)

Gaius Albucius Silus was an ancient Roman orator and teacher of rhetoric under emperor Augustus. He was born and died in Novaria (today Novara), but made his career in Rome. Suetonius gives a sketch of his life, while Seneca the Elder describes him as an outstanding declaimer.

In the novel Albucius (1990), Pascal Quignard invents fifty-three controversiae (fictitious lawsuits) by Albucius and alternates them with historical and fictional scenes from his life.

== Primary sources ==
- Suetonius on Albucius Silus (in English)
- Introduction to the 7th book of Seneca's Controversiae (in Latin)
