= Gaius Acilius =

Roman senator and historian

Gaius Acilius (fl. 155 BC) was a senator and historian of ancient Rome. He knew Greek, and in 155 BC interpreted for Carneades, Diogenes, and Critolaus, who had come to the Roman Senate on an embassy from Athens.

Plutarch cites Acilius' history in the Life of Remus. His history was written in Greek and contained events at least as late as 184 BC (according to Dionysius of Halicarnassus), and it appeared around 142 BC (mentioned in Livy). The work was translated into Latin by a Claudius, most likely Claudius Quadrigarius, but only fragments survive.

== See also ==
- Acilia gens
