= Seneca the Elder =

Roman scholar, writer and historian (c. 54 BC – c. AD 39)

- Born: c. 54 BC Corduba, Hispania (present-day Spain)
- Died: c. 39 AD (aged c. 92)
- Spouse: Helvia
- Children: Lucius Junius Gallio Annaeanus; Lucius Annaeus Seneca the Younger; Marcus Annaeus Mela
- Writing career
- Language: Latin, Greek
- Genres: Rhetoric, Silver Age of Latin, history
- Notable works: Oratorum et Rhetorum Sententiae Divisiones Colores; Historiae ab Initio Bellorum Civilium

Lucius Annaeus Seneca the Elder (/ˈsɛnɪkə/ SEN-ik-ə; c. 54 BC – c. AD 39), also known as Seneca the Rhetorician, was a Roman writer, born of a wealthy equestrian family of Corduba, Hispania. He wrote a collection of reminiscences about the Roman schools of rhetoric, six books of which are extant in a more or less complete state and five others in epitome only. His principal work, a history of Roman affairs from the beginning of the civil wars until the last years of his life, is almost entirely lost to posterity. Seneca lived through the reigns of three significant emperors; Augustus (ruled 27 BC – 14 AD), Tiberius (ruled 14–37 AD) and Caligula (ruled 37–41 AD). He was the father of Lucius Junius Gallio Annaeanus, best known as a Proconsul of Achaia; his second son was the dramatist and Stoic philosopher Seneca the Younger (Lucius), who was tutor of Nero, and his third son, Marcus Annaeus Mela, became the father of the poet Lucan.

== Biography ==
Seneca the Elder is the first of the gens Annaea of whom there is definite knowledge. During the renaissance his name and his works became confused with his son Lucius Annaeus Seneca. In the early 16th century Raphael of Volterra saw that there must be two different men. He noted that two of the elder Seneca's grandsons were called Marcus and since there was a Roman custom for boys to be given the name of their grandfather, Raphael adopted the name of Marcus for the elder Seneca. Until the 20th century this was used as the standard praenomen. However it is now accepted that this naming custom was not rigid, and since in the manuscripts he is referred to as Lucius, many scholars now prefer this praenomen since it would also help explain why their works became so confused.

Growing up in Spain of wealth and equestrian rank, Seneca the Elder (here Seneca) was a young contemporary of the venerable Roman orator Cicero, whose voice of advocacy he might have sought out were he reared in Italy. Instead, he was confined by wartime conditions to 'within the walls' of his 'own colony', and there, presumably, he received his first schooling from a praeceptor teaching more than two hundred pupils.

When Rome became safe after the Civil Wars, Seneca travelled for lengthy stays there. He assiduously attended public declamations by teachers of rhetoric and professional orators—the process in those days by which young men trained for pursuing careers in advocacy and public administration. There is no evidence, however, that he pursued such a career himself. And he avoided notice of his writing a history of Rome 'From the beginning of the Civil Wars' through his own times, during the regime of Caligula. Instead, by testimony of the son Seneca (from his De Vita Patris), his father remained all his life a private gentleman. Still, Seneca supported as honourable the political careers of his elder (two) sons, and he spoke for the study of rhetoric as honourable even as he was fully aware of the dangers inherent in such careers: 'in which the very objectives sought after are to be feared'. And he supported his youngest son, Mela, who remained content with his heritage as an equestrian.

== Works ==
=== The declamatory anthology ===
In his old age, on basis of his experiences attending the schools and auditoria of the declaimers in the Rome of Augustus and Tiberius, Seneca the Elder (Seneca) completed the work on which his fame rests today: the Oratorum et Rhetorum Sententiae Divisiones Colores. Originally comprising ten books on the subject of fictitious lawsuits (Controversiae) and at least one book on fictitious speeches of persuasion (Suasoriae), his effort was ostensibly at the request of his sons, and was ostensibly written from memory. The influence of declamation was widespread in Roman elite culture, both in a didactic role and as a performative genre. Public declamations were attended by such figures as Pliny the Elder, Asinius Pollio, Maecenas, and the emperor Augustus. Seneca mentioned the poet Ovid as being a star declaimer; the works of the satirists Martial and Juvenal and the historian Tacitus reveal substantial declamatory influence.

Seneca's work here, however, is neither a collection of his own declamations nor fair copies of those delivered by other declaimers; it is an anthology. It provides extracts and analyses of the declamatory art issuing from the rhetorical celebrities of his (younger) days spent in Rome. It is not a theoretical treatise on declamation; Seneca's own input is limited to pen-portraits of the famous declaimers he cites, plus analytical and critical commentary on their work; and of anecdotes remembered from the literary chatter of long ago.

The declaimers of Augustan and Tiberian Rome professed admiration for Cicero, but their preferred oratorical style was not very Ciceronian; nor was it the theoretical basis of their educational method. The declamation they practised was, Seneca claimed, a new art, born during his lifetime—its characteristic concentration being on a bizarre set of imaginary lawsuits known as controversiae. So far as Rome the City was concerned, we must believe him. If the new art originated from schools elsewhere in the Greek-speaking world—which is likely, in view of the remoteness of those declamatory themes from the realities in then-Roman law-courts—Seneca seems to have been unaware of it. He was, however, well acquainted with the activities (in the City) of Greek rhetoricians teaching their art in Greek alongside those who taught it in Latin.

Porcius Latro was a close friend of Seneca—from their childhood together and as classmates at the rhetorical school of Marullus in Cordoba—who later became preeminent among Rome's rhetoricians in the Augustan era. Latro cultivated the sort of "fiery and agitated style" that Seneca particularly admired. He was characterized by the anthologist as a man of both gravity and charm, as eloquent and worthy. Another close family connection of the Senecas, the orator Junius Gallio, was the only serious rival to Latro among Rome's best declaimers, according to Seneca. His tributes to Latro illustrates how both men inhabited a literary world far distant from Cicero's—one in which delight in neat contrasts and paradoxes had become all-consuming. " [N]o one," wrote Seneca of Latro, "was more in command of his intellect: no one was more indulgent towards it".

In the prefaces to his books of Controversiae Seneca identifies rhetoricians who were contemporaries of Latro but with different approaches and skills than his Latronian ideal. He refers specifically to a primum tetradeum, meaning the four most distinguished declaimers he had known, which included Latro, Gallio, Albucius Silus, and Arellius Fuscus. He expresses serious reservations of Arellius' style, for its unevenness, and its descriptive passages (explicationes), which Seneca considered "brilliant, but laboured and involved, with a decorative finish too contrived, and word-positioning too effeminate, to be tolerable for a mind preparing itself for such holy and courageous teachings." But there was no denying the distinction in Rome of the school of Arellius Fuscus, whose pupils included the philosophical writer Fabianus, and the poet Ovid; thus, even by his severe critic, Arellius was ranked highly. Albucius Silus too was influential—as the author of a textbook that Quintilian cited several times.

Seneca's declamatory anthology presents a far-reaching critical investigation of the rhetorical basis of the mannerist, so-called 'Silver Age', literature. Of this age, Ovid's work and the younger Seneca's sententious disquisitions and dramatic art, and later, Lucan's fiery epic poetry all stand out as striking examples.

=== The ten books of the Controversiae ===
Of the ten books of the Controversiae—there are declamatory treatments of some 74 judicial themes, with the names of individual rhetoricians, plus Seneca's critical comments—only five: 1, 2, 7, 9, 10, survive in entirety or nearly-so. Information from the missing books is supplied by an epitome written several centuries later for school use. Later, this same tome supplied stories for European literature of the late Middle Ages, namely the 14th century anecdotes-collection known as the Gesta Romanorum.

Each of Seneca's books was introduced by a preface, an approach he compared to that adopted by organizers of gladiatorial shows. Each preface presents pen-portraits of famous declaimers, either as individuals or in pairs. In the tenth preface, Seneca provided a group presentation of declaimers previously overlooked.

Following the prefaces are surveys of the treatments of particular controversia-themes by noted declaimers. These surveys, in keeping with the title of the anthology—Oratorum et Rhetorum Sententiae Divisiones Colores—were usually provided in three main sections. The first section was sententiae, or 'ways of thinking', as adopted by various declaimers about their set themes. The second section: divisiones, or outlines of their argumentation; and the third: colores, or specious interpretations of the actions of their imaginary defendants, with a view to excusing or vilifying them.

The books of Controversiae were supplemented by at least one devoted to Suasoriae (exercises in deliberative oratory), in which historical or mythological characters are imagined as deliberating on their options at crucial junctures in their career. In the only extant book of his Suasoriae, Seneca provides sententiae by the declaimers cited, followed by their divisiones; but there are no colores, which belong exclusively to treatment of judicial rhetoric, and have no place in deliberative oratory.

The elder Seneca's authorship of the declamatory anthology Controversiae—generally ascribed to his son during the Middle Ages—was vindicated by the work of the Renaissance humanists Raffaello Maffei and Justus Lipsius.

=== History ===
The elder Seneca (Seneca) was also the author of a lost historical work that recorded a history of Rome from the beginning of the civil wars to (almost) his death, after which it was published by his son. We learn about this magnum opus from the younger Seneca's own work 'De vita patris' (H. Peter, Historicorum Romanorum fragmenta, 1883, 292, 301) and from a large fragment of the Historiae itself, cited by Lactantius in Institutiones Divinae 7.15.14. The Lactantius fragment is prefatory (introductory) in character and pessimistic in outlook; it likens the history of Rome to the Seven Ages of Man, while comparing Rome's reversion to monarchical rule with the 'second infancy' of senility. Also extant is Seneca's account of the death of Tiberius, cited by Suetonius in Tiberius 73.

In 2017 the papyrologist Valeria Piano published a detailed study of P.Herc 1067, a charred papyrus-roll collected from Herculaneum—it was buried by Mt. Vesuvius in AD 79. The scroll was first excavated probably in 1782, and partially unrolled in the early nineteenth century. Piano asserts in her study (published in Cronache Ercolanesi, 47, pp. 163–250), on basis of traces of lettering on its final subscriptio, that the text was written by one 'L. Annaeus Seneca'. And, from what can be read of the narrative—that is, of historical and political themes relating to the first decades of the Roman Empire—she proposes that it most likely originated in (the elder) Seneca's Historiae. Further, she judges that traces of a book-title following the author's name (in the subscriptio) are more compatible with Seneca's own ' ... ab initio b[ell]orum [civilium] ' than with his declamatory anthology.

Unfortunately, the text of the scroll is now essentially unreadable as continuous narrative because, in the process of unrolling, several layers of tightly rolled papyrus remained stuck together and were peeled away from each other unevenly.

== Editions of the declamatory anthology ==
- Nicolas Lefèvre (Nicholas Faber) (Paris, 1587)
- JF Gronovius (Leiden, 1649, Amsterdam, 1672)
- Conrad Bursian (critical edition) (Leipzig, 1857)
- Adolf Kiessling (Leipzig, 1872)
- Hermann Johannes Müller (Prague, 1887)
- Michael Winterbottom, (1974) Declamations, (Controversiae, Suasoriae. Fragments). 2 vols. Loeb Classical Library

== Sources ==
- Sussmann, Lewis A., ed. (1994). The Declamations of Calpurnius Flaccus: Text, Translation, and Commentary. Mnemosyne Bibliotheca Classica Batava. Vol. 133. Leiden: Brill. ISBN 9789004099838.
