= Humphrey Ely =

English Roman Catholic priest and scholar

Humphrey Ely, LL.D., (died 1604) was an English Catholic divine.

== Life ==
Ely was the brother of William Ely, president of St John's College, Oxford, and was a native of Herefordshire. After studying at Brasenose College, Oxford, he was elected a scholar of St John's College in 1566. On account of his attachment to the Catholic faith he left the university without a degree. He went to the English college at Douay, where he was made a licentiate in the canon and civil laws. He appears to have been subsequently created LL.D.

=== 1570s ===
In July 1577 he and other students of law formed a community in the town of Douay and resided together in a rented house. This establishment was soon broken up by the troubles with local Calvinists. Ely was hooted as a traitor in the streets of Douay, and the members of his community and of the English college were subjected to frequent domiciliary visits; which satisfied the municipal authorities but not the populace.

In consequence William Allen found it necessary to move the college from Douay to Rheims in 1578.

After studying divinity at Rheims Ely accompanied Allen to Rome in August 1579, when the dissensions had occurred in the English college there, but he returned with him to Rheims in the following spring. During his stay in Rome, Allen employed him in revising several controversial books.

=== 1580s ===
In June 1580 he visited England, disguised as a merchant, travelling under the name of Havard or Howard. Sailing with him were three priests: Edward Rishton, Thomas Cottam, and John Hart. On their landing at Dover the searchers arrested Cottam and Hart. The mayor, supposing that Ely was a military man, requested him to convey Cottam to London and hand him over to Lord Cobham, governor of the Cinque ports. When they were out of the town, Ely allowed his prisoner to go at large. Cottam, entertaining scruples about the danger that his friend might incur, insisted upon delivering himself up and was afterwards executed. Ely was committed to prison, but soon obtained his release, probably on account of his not being a priest.

On 23 April 1581 he arrived at Rheims, out of Spain, and in the following month visited Paris, in company with Allen. He was ordained subdeacon at Laon on 8 March 1581–2, deacon at Châlons-sur-Marne on the 31st of the same month, and priest on 14 April 1582.

On 22 July 1586 he left Rheims for Pont-à-Mousson, where he had been appointed by the Duke of Lorraine to the professorship of the canon and civil laws, and he occupied that chair till his death on 15 March 1603–4. He was buried in the church of the nuns of the order of St. Clare.

== Works ==
He wrote 'Certaine Briefe Notes vpon a Briefe Apologie set out vnder the name of the Priestes vnited to the Archpriest. Drawn by an vnpassionate secular Prieste, friend to bothe partyes, but more frend to the truth. Whereunto is added a seuerall answeare vnto the particularites obiected against certaine Persons,’ Paris (1603). This work, elicited by Robert Parsons's 'Brief Apology,’ was written by Ely shortly before his death and published by an anonymous editor, probably Dr. Christopher Bagshaw. It was a contribution to the archpriest controversy.

Ely wrote in English, with a view to publication, the lives of some of the martyrs in Elizabeth's reign, as appears from a letter addressed by him from Pont-à-Mousson, 20 June or July 1587, to Father John Gibbons, S. J., rector of the college of Treves.
