= Epicharis cuneata =

Conservation status
- Least Concern (IUCN 3.1)

Scientific classification
- Kingdom: Plantae
- Clade: Tracheophytes
- Clade: Angiosperms
- Clade: Eudicots
- Clade: Rosids
- Order: Sapindales
- Family: Meliaceae
- Genus: Epicharis
- Species: E. cuneata

Binomial name
- Epicharis cuneata (Hiern) Harms (1940)

Synonyms
- Alliaria cuneata (Hiern) Kuntze (1891); Alliaria beccariana (C.DC.) Kuntze (1891); Alliaria hiernii Kuntze (1891); Dysoxylum angustifoliolum Merr. (1925); Dysoxylum beccarianum C.DC. (1878); Dysoxylum cauliflorum Hiern (1875); Dysoxylum cauliflorum var. tomentellum Stapf (1894); Dysoxylum cuneatum Hiern (1875); Dysoxylum foxworthyi Elmer (1937), no Latin descr.; Epicharis angustifoliola (Merr.) Harms (1940); Epicharis foxworthyi (Elmer) Harms (1940), not validly publ.; Epicharis hierniana (Hiern) Harms (1940), nom. superfl.; Lepisanthes forbesii Baker f. (1924)

Species of tree

Epicharis cuneata is a tree in the family Meliaceae.

== Description ==
The tree grows up to 30 metres (100 ft) tall with a trunk diameter of up to 50 centimetres (20 in). The bark is grey. The sweetly scented flowers are white, pinkish or cream. The fruits are red, shaped like a top, up to 4 cm (2 in) in diameter.

The synonym specific epithet cauliflorum is from the Latin meaning 'flowers on the trunk'.

== Distribution and habitat ==
Epicharis cuneata is native to portions of Indochina and Malesia, ranging from Myanmar to Thailand, Cambodia, Vietnam, Peninsular Malaysia, Sumatra, Borneo, and the Philippines. Its habitat is a variety of forests from sea-level to 1,500 metres (5,000 ft) elevation.
