= Acilia (mother of Lucan) =

Ancient Roman noblewoman

Acilia was a noblewoman of Hispania Baetica in ancient Rome who lived in the 1st century AD, and was implicated in the Pisonian conspiracy to overthrow the Roman emperor Nero.

Acilia was the mother of the poet Lucan, who was one of the original members who incited the conspiracy. According to the historian Tacitus, when, in 65 AD, the 25-year-old Lucan was arrested, he informed on several members of the conspiracy, including Acilia, in the vain hope of securing a pardon. Lucan and his father, Marcus Annaeus Mela, Acilia's husband, were proscribed and forced into suicide. Acilia was spared punishment.

Some scholars have speculated whether Lucan ever actually even informed on his mother, and whether Acilia was a part of the conspiracy at all. These have observed that it is curious that Acilia was said to have escaped punishment, when other women associated with the conspiracy were as ruthlessly punished as Lucan himself was. Some have even speculated whether it was a lie spread, possibly by Nero himself, to posthumously slander Lucan and paint a picture of him as treacherous, and willing to sacrifice his own mother in the hope of escaping punishment. Others have interpreted this event to indicate Acilia was never part of the conspiracy and Lucan was naming her -- someone obviously not part of it -- as a conspirator as a way to thumb his nose at Nero as a last act.
