= Antonius Natalis =

1st century AD Roman equestrian

Antonius Natalis (fl. AD 65) was an ancient Roman of the equestrian order who took part in the Pisonian conspiracy against Nero. As a conspirator, he provided Gaius Calpurnius Piso with secretive information regarding the emperor. After Flavius Scaevinus's freedman, Milichus, alerted Nero of Piso's conspiracy, Natalis, having met with Scaevinus that day, was suspected of being involved. When he was questioned, Natalis disclosed information vital to the conspiracy, thereby avoiding punishment.
