= Subrius Flavus =

Tribune of the Praetorian Guard implicated in the Pisonian conspiracy against Emperor Nero

Subrius Flavus was a tribune of the Praetorian Guard considered a leading figure in the Pisonian conspiracy against the emperor Nero. He was executed for his involvement in 65 CE.

As tribune and a man of military experience, Flavus enjoyed great significance in the plot. Along several others including the centurion Sulpicius Asper, Flavus is described as one of the conspiracy's "leading lights" by Tacitus. He was close to Gaius Calpurnius Piso, the figurehead of the conspiracy.

Tacitus observes that Flavus' hatred for Nero arose suddenly while he was watching him perform on stage but failed to attack him in front of the audience because he would not have had a chance to escape. Tacitus also observes that Flavus intended to murder Piso if the conspiracy succeeded and give control over the empire to Seneca the Younger, a fellow conspirator, because "it mattered not as to the disgrace if a harp-player were removed and a tragic actor succeeded him." For as Nero used to sing to the harp, so did Piso in the dress of a tragedian".

As a result of his involvement in the conspiracy, Flavus was interogated by Nero and condemned to death. He was beheaded in two strokes in front of a pit near the Castra Praetoria in 65 CE. The execution was entrusted to a tribune, Veianius Niger.

Tacitus presents Flavus, like Seneca the Younger, as a bastion of traditional Roman morality because of his stand against Nero's excesses. The Classicist Edward Champlin argues that Flavus is one of the few figures in the Annals whom Tacitus eulogises without reserve.
