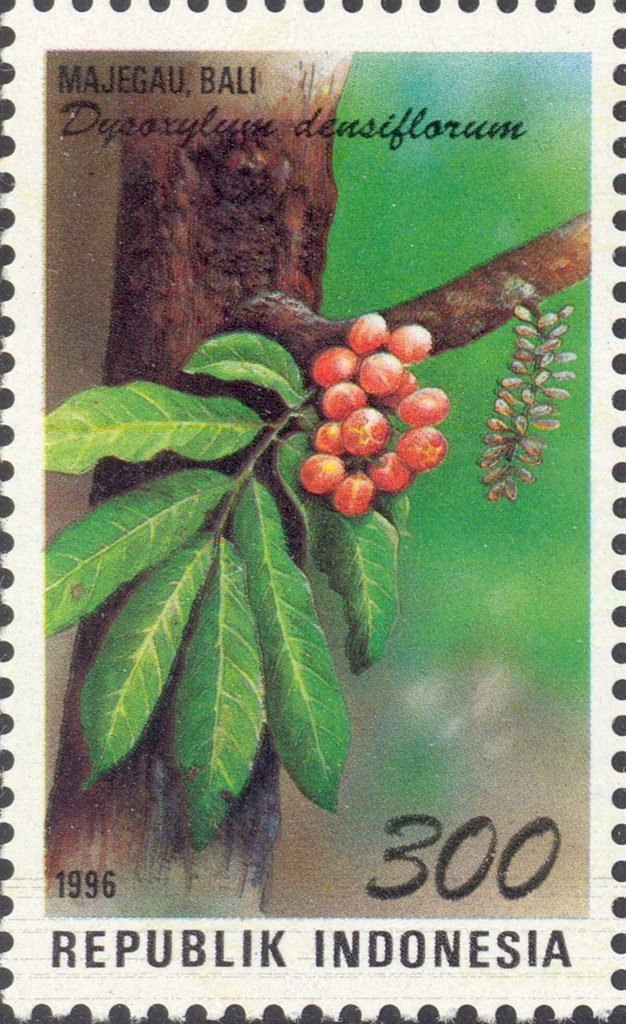

Scientific classification
- Kingdom: Plantae
- Clade: Embryophytes
- Clade: Tracheophytes
- Clade: Spermatophytes
- Clade: Angiosperms
- Clade: Eudicots
- Clade: Rosids
- Order: Sapindales
- Family: Meliaceae
- Genus: Epicharis
- Species: E. densiflora

Binomial name
- Epicharis densiflora Blume (1825)

Synonyms
- List: Alliaria densiflora (Blume) Kuntze (1891); Alliaria trichostyla Kuntze (1891); Dysoxylum densiflorum (Blume) Miq. (1868); Dysoxylum densiflorum var. minus Koord. & Valeton (1896); Dysoxylum elmeri Merr. (1929); Dysoxylum trichostylum Miq. (1868); Dysoxylum trichostylum f. glabrum Miq. (1868); Dysoxylum trichostylum f. pubescens Miq. (1868); Epicharis altissima Blume (1825); Guarea densiflora (Blume) Spreng. (1827)

= Epicharis densiflora =

Species of tree

Epicharis densiflora is a tree in the family Meliaceae. The specific epithet densiflora means 'dense flowers'.

== Description ==
The tree grows up to 45 m (150 ft) tall with a trunk diameter of up to 65 cm (26 in). The bark is grey-green. The sweetly scented flowers are white. The grey-green fruits are pear-shaped to spindle-shaped, measuring up to 4 cm (1.6 in) long.

== Distribution and habitat ==
Epicharis densiflora is native to Myanmar, south-central China, Thailand, the Andaman and Nicobar Islands, Peninsular Malaysia, Borneo, Sumatra, Java, Sulawesi, and the Lesser Sunda Islands. Its habitat is rain forest from sea level to 1,700 m (5,600 ft) elevation.

== Culture ==
It can be seen in Bali's Botanic Garden located about 50 km (31 mi) north of at Denpasar, the capital city of Bali.

A postage stamp was proposed to be issued by Indonesia on the rich flora and fauna of its provinces. It was proposed to issue 33 stamps in succession between 2008 and 2011. In 2008 the series issued represented the province of Bali with the stamp depicting this tree (known as majegau in Indonesian) and the Bali starling (Leucopsar rothschildi).

The timber of majegau is strong and decorative, and is one of the woods that is used in traditional Bali carvings.
