= Lucan =

Roman poet (AD 39–65)

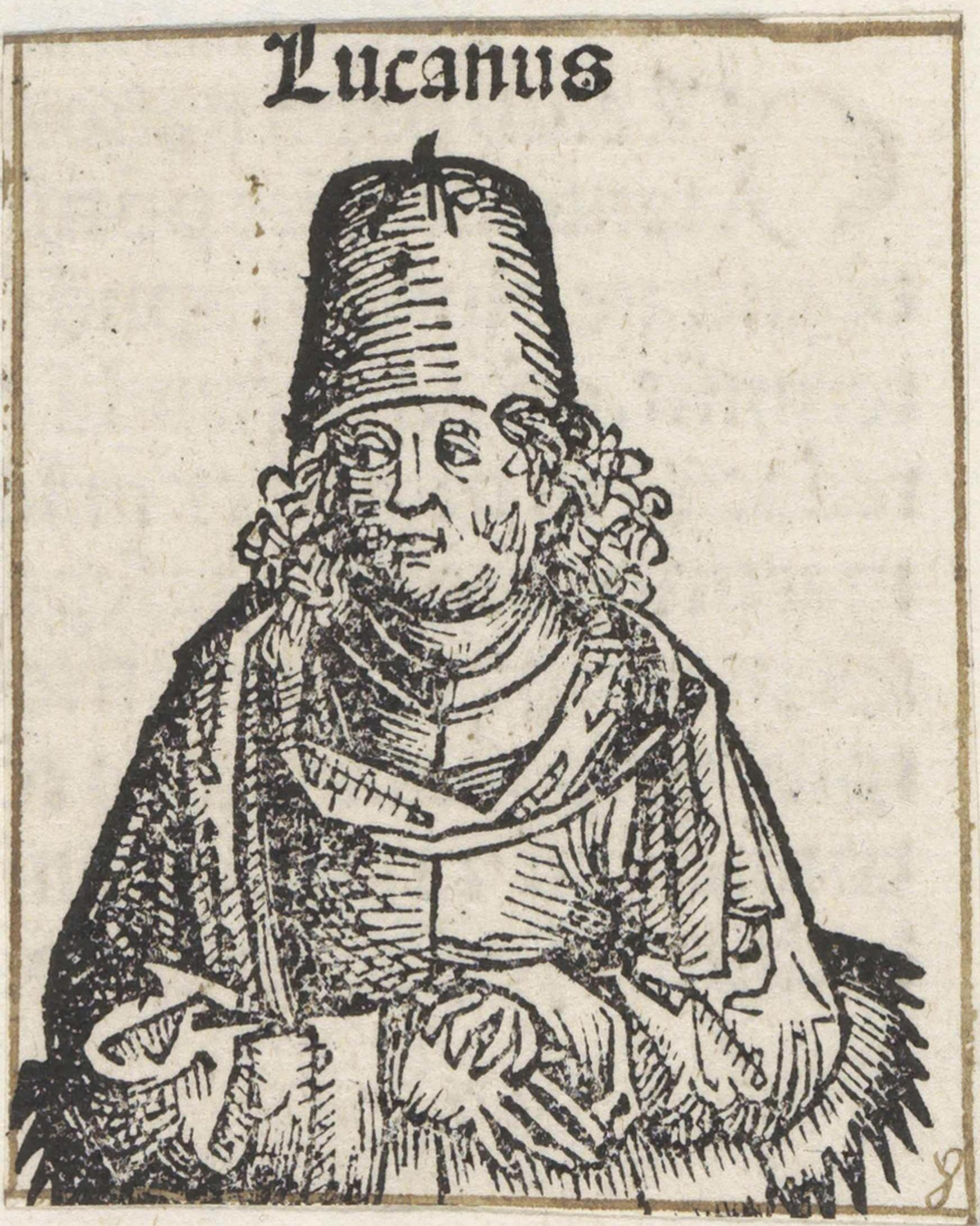
- Imaginary portrait of Lucan from the Nuremberg Chronicle. There are no ancient likenesses.
- Born: 3 November AD 39; Corduba, Hispania Baetica
- Died: 30 April AD 65 (aged 25)
- Cause of death: Forced suicide
- Occupation: Poet
- Spouse: Polla Argentaria
- Parents: Marcus Annaeus Mela (father); Acilia (mother)
- Family: gens Annaea

Marcus Annaeus Lucanus (3 November AD 39 – 30 April AD 65), better known in English as Lucan (/ˈluːkən/), was a Roman poet, born in Corduba, Hispania Baetica (present-day Córdoba, Spain). He is regarded as one of the outstanding figures of the Imperial Latin period, known in particular for his epic Pharsalia. His youth and speed of composition set him apart from other poets.

== Life ==
Three brief ancient accounts allow for the reconstruction of a modest biography – the earliest attributed to Suetonius, another to an otherwise unknown Vacca, and the third anonymous and undated – along with references in Martial, Cassius Dio, Tacitus's Annals, and one of Statius's Silvae. Lucan was born in the Roman colony of Corduba into a wealthy family of central Italic origins; he was the son of Marcus Annaeus Mela and grandson of Seneca the Elder. He grew up under the tutelage of his uncle Seneca the Younger. He studied rhetoric at Athens and was probably provided with a philosophical and Stoic education by his uncle.

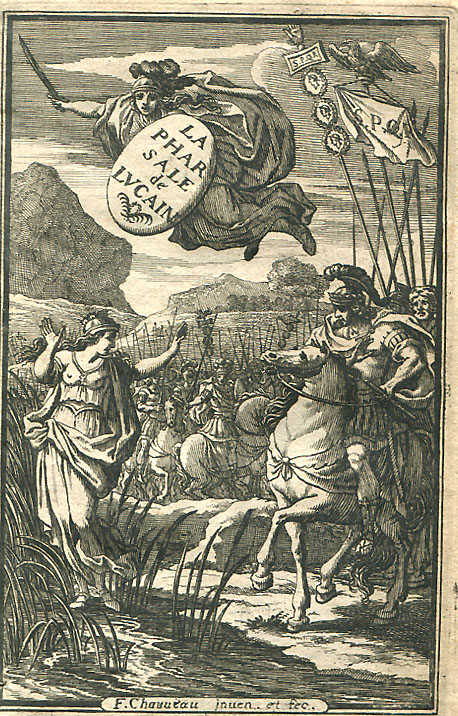
Engraved title page of a French edition of Lucan's Pharsalia, 1657

The 5th-century author Sidonius Apollinaris implies that Polla Argentaria—Lucan's wife—may have assisted him in the creation of the Pharsalia, though the philologist Peter White suggests that this story could easily be a later invention and denigrates the account as "sentimental fancy".

He found success under Nero, became one of the emperor's close friends and was rewarded with a quaestorship in advance of the legal age. In AD 60, he won a prize for extemporizing Orpheus and Laudes Neronis at the quinquennial Neronia, and was again rewarded when the emperor appointed him to the augurate. During this time he circulated the first three books of his epic poem Pharsalia (labelled De Bello civili in the manuscripts), which told the story of the civil war between Julius Caesar and Pompey.

At some point, a feud began between Nero and Lucan. Two very different accounts of the events have survived that both trivialize the feud. According to Tacitus, Nero became jealous of Lucan and forbade him to publish his poems. According to Suetonius, Nero disrupted a public reading by Lucan, by leaving and calling a meeting of the senate, and Lucan responded by writing insulting poems about Nero.

Other works, though, point to a more serious basis to the feud. Works by the grammarian Vacca and the poet Statius may support the claim that Lucan wrote insulting poems about Nero. Vacca mentions that one of Lucan's works was entitled De Incendio Urbis (On the Burning of the City). Statius's ode to Lucan mentions that Lucan described how the "unspeakable flames of the criminal tyrant roamed the heights of Remus." Additionally, the later books of Pharsalia are anti-Imperial and pro-Republic. This criticism of Nero and the office of the Emperor may have been the true cause of the ban.

Lucan later joined the conspiracy of Gaius Calpurnius Piso against Nero. The conspiracy was discovered and he was obliged, at the age of 25, to commit suicide by opening a vein, but not before incriminating his mother, Acilia, among others, in the hopes of a pardon. According to Tacitus, as Lucan bled to death, "(he) recalled some poetry he had composed in which he had told the story of a wounded soldier dying a similar kind of death and he recited the very lines. These were his last words." An alternative interpretation of events is that his death was not by suicide, but was an execution carried out at Nero's command.

His father was involved in the proscription, but his mother escaped. Statius's poem about Lucan was addressed to his widow, Polla Argentaria, upon the occasion of his birthday during the reign of Domitian (Silvae, ii.7, the Genethliacon Lucani).

== Works ==
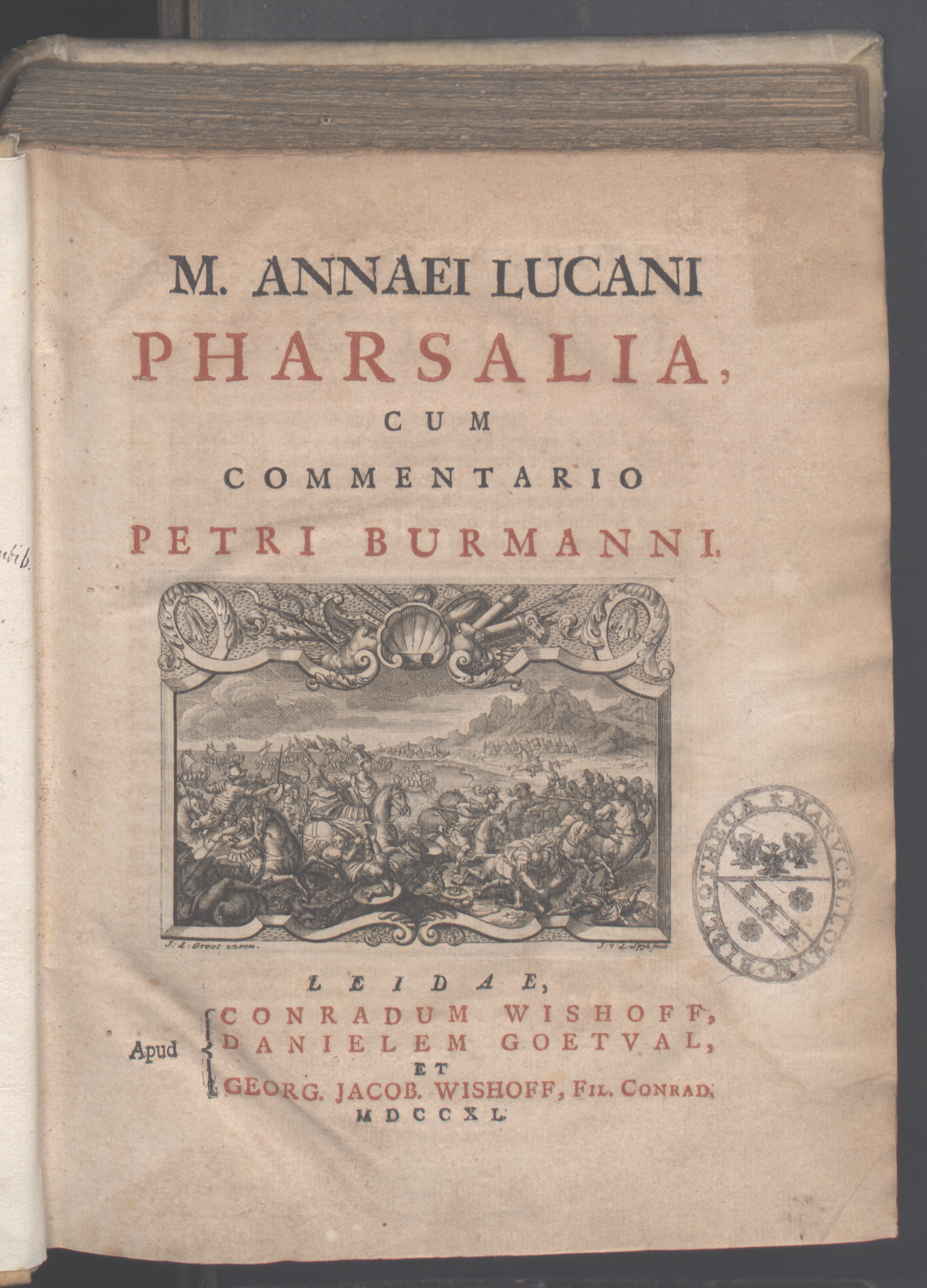
Pharsalia, 1740

According to Vacca and Statius, Lucan's works included:

Surviving work:

- Pharsalia or De Bello Civili (On the Civil War), on the wars between Julius Caesar and Pompey

Often attributed to him (but to others as well):

- Laus Pisonis (Praise of Piso), a panegyric of a member of the Piso family

Lost works:

- Catachthonion
- Iliacon from the Trojan cycle
- Epigrammata
- Adlocutio ad Pollam
- Silvae
- Saturnalia
- Medea
- Salticae Fabulae
- Laudes Neronis, a praise of Nero
- Orpheus
- Prosa oratio in Octavium Sagittam
- Epistulae ex Campania
- De Incendio Urbis, on the Roman fire of 64, perhaps accusing Nero of arson

== Sources ==
- White, Peter (1975). "The Friends of Martial, Statius, and Pliny, and the Dispersal of Patronage". Harvard Studies in Classical Philology. 79: 265–300. doi:10.2307/311139. ISSN 0073-0688.
