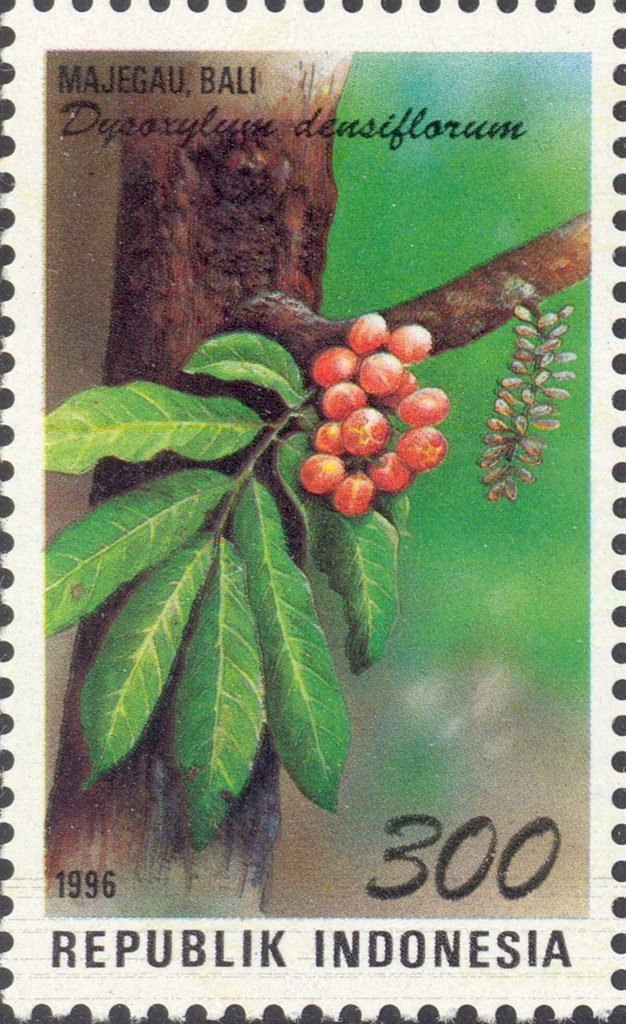
- E. densiflora (type species) on an Indonesian stamp

Scientific classification
- Kingdom: Plantae
- Clade: Tracheophytes
- Clade: Angiosperms
- Clade: Eudicots
- Clade: Rosids
- Order: Sapindales
- Family: Meliaceae
- Subfamily: Melioideae
- Genus: Epicharis; Blume (1825)

Type species
- Epicharis densiflora Blume

Species
- see text

Synonyms
- Piptosaccos Turcz. (1858)

= Epicharis (plant) =

Genus of flowering plants

Epicharis is a genus of flowering plants in the family Meliaceae. It includes seven species which range from Indochina to south-central China, Taiwan, Malesia, Papuasia, Queensland, and Fiji.

The genus was first named by Carl Ludwig Blume in 1825. Most of the species currently accepted were, until recently, included in genus Dysoxylum. A genetic study published in 2021 found that Dysoxylum is polyphyletic, and Epicharis was revived and re-circumscribed.

The genus is named for Epicharis (d. 65 CE), a Roman woman who was a leader in the Pisonian conspiracy, and who was tortured and committed suicide rather than betray her co-conspirators.

== Species ==
Plants of the World Online includes the following accepted species:

- Epicharis alata (Harms) Harms – New Guinea
- Epicharis brevipanicula (C.DC.) Hauenschild & Mabb. – east-central New Guinea
- Epicharis cumingiana (C.DC.) Harms – Taiwan, Philippines, Maluku Islands, Sulawesi, and Lesser Sunda Islands
- Epicharis cuneata (Hiern) Harms – Indochina, Peninsular Malaysia, Sumatra, Borneo, and the Philippines
- Epicharis densiflora Blume – type species - southern Yunnan (south-Central China), Myanmar, Thailand, Sumatra, Borneo, Java, Sulawesi, and the Lesser Sunda Islands
- Epicharis gillespieana (A.C.Sm.) Holzmeyer & Hauenschild – Fiji
- Epicharis parasitica (Osbeck) Mabb. – Taiwan (Lan Yü), Malesia, Papuasia, and Queensland
