= Epicharis (Pisonian conspirator) =

Roman freedwoman and member of the Pisonian conspiracy against emperor Nero

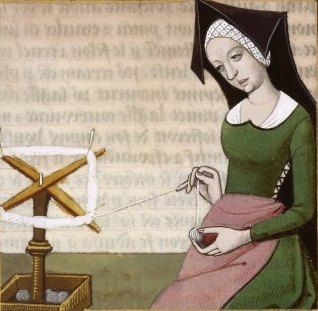
Ill. in De mulieribus claris

Epicharis (Ancient Greek: Ἐπίχαρις; died AD 65) was an Ancient Roman freedwoman and a leading member of the Pisonian conspiracy against the emperor Nero.

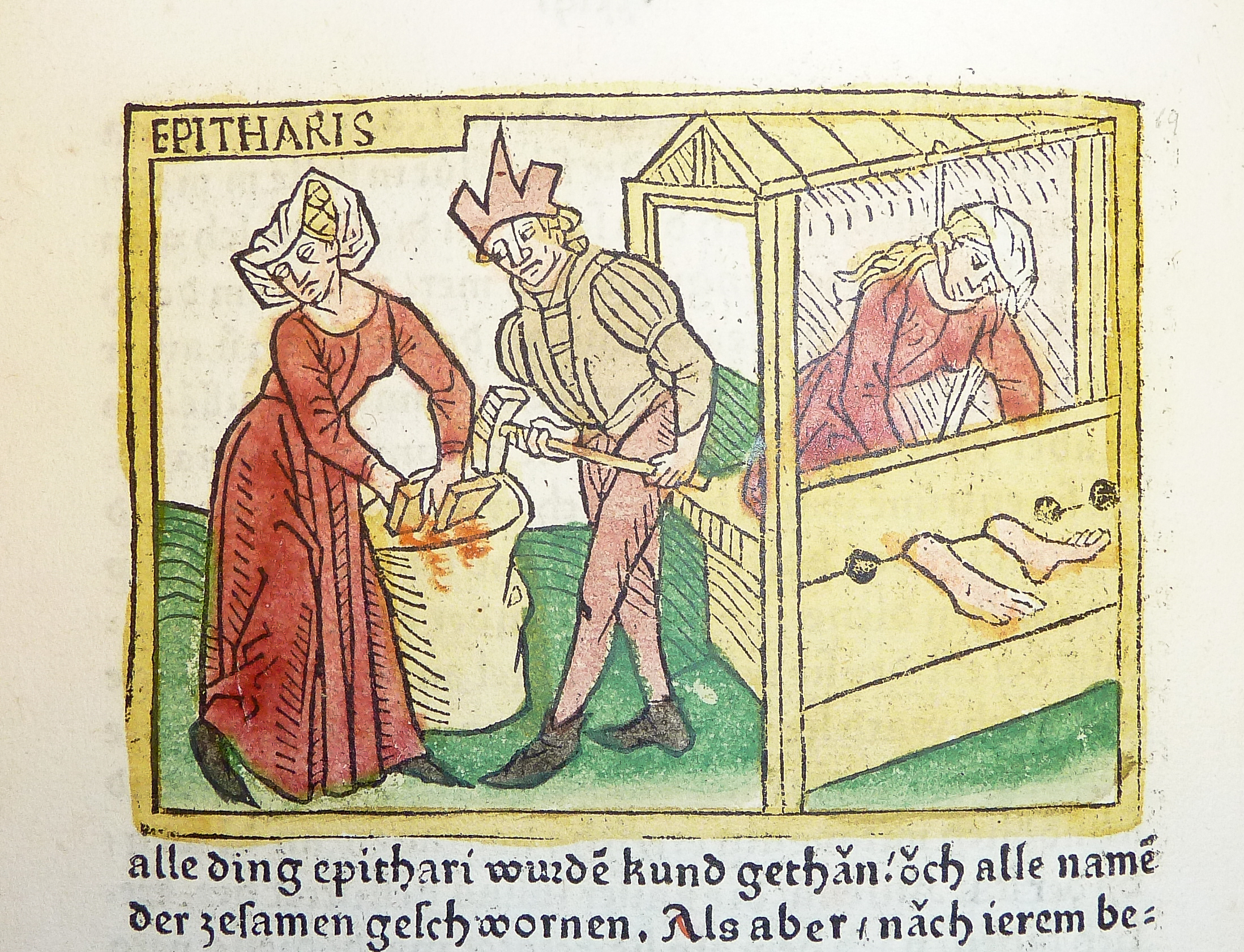
The torture of Epicharis, from a 15th-century woodcut.

According to Polyaenus she was the mistress of a brother of Seneca, and it may be that through this connection she became acquainted with the plot of the conspirators, though Tacitus says that it was unknown by what means she had acquired her knowledge of it.

She endeavored by all means to stimulate the conspirators to carry their plan into effect. But as they acted slowly and with great hesitation, she at length grew tired, and resolved upon trying to win over the sailors of the fleet of Misenum in Campania, where she was staying. One Volusius Proculus, a chiliarch of the fleet, appears to have been the first who was initiated by her in the secret, but no names were mentioned to him. Proculus had no sooner obtained the information than he betrayed the whole plot to Nero.

Epicharis was summoned before the emperor, but as no names had been mentioned, and as no witnesses had been present at the communication, Epicharis easily refuted the accusation. She was, however, kept in custody. Subsequently, when the conspiracy was discovered, Nero ordered her to be tortured on the rack because she refused naming any of the accomplices; but neither blows, nor fire, nor the increased fury of her tormentors, could extort any confession from her. When on the second or third day after she was carried in a sedan chair – for her limbs were already broken – to be tortured a second time, she strangled herself on her way by her girdle, which she fastened to the chair. She thus acted, as Tacitus says, more nobly than many a noble eques or senator, who without being tortured betrayed their nearest relatives.

== Cultural impact ==
She is mentioned in Boccaccio's De mulieribus claris and Montaigne's Essays.

The later Italian politician and writer Niccolò Machiavelli praised Epicharis's audacity, and also stated that she had been one of Nero's former mistresses.

Daniel Casper von Lohenstein was the first dramatist to produce a drama named after Epicharis, in 1665; and in 1794 the French poet Gabriel-Marie Legouvé published the spoken play Épicharis et Néron. In 1829 Thomas Henry Lister published Epicharis: An Historical Tragedy. Epicharis has also featured as a character in other operas and dramas.

Epicharis is one of the 998 mythical, historical or notable women named on the heritage floor of Judy Chicago's The Dinner Party art installation (1979).

In 1825 botanist Carl Ludwig Blume named the plant genus Epicharis after her.
