= Duke of Exeter's daughter =

Torture device

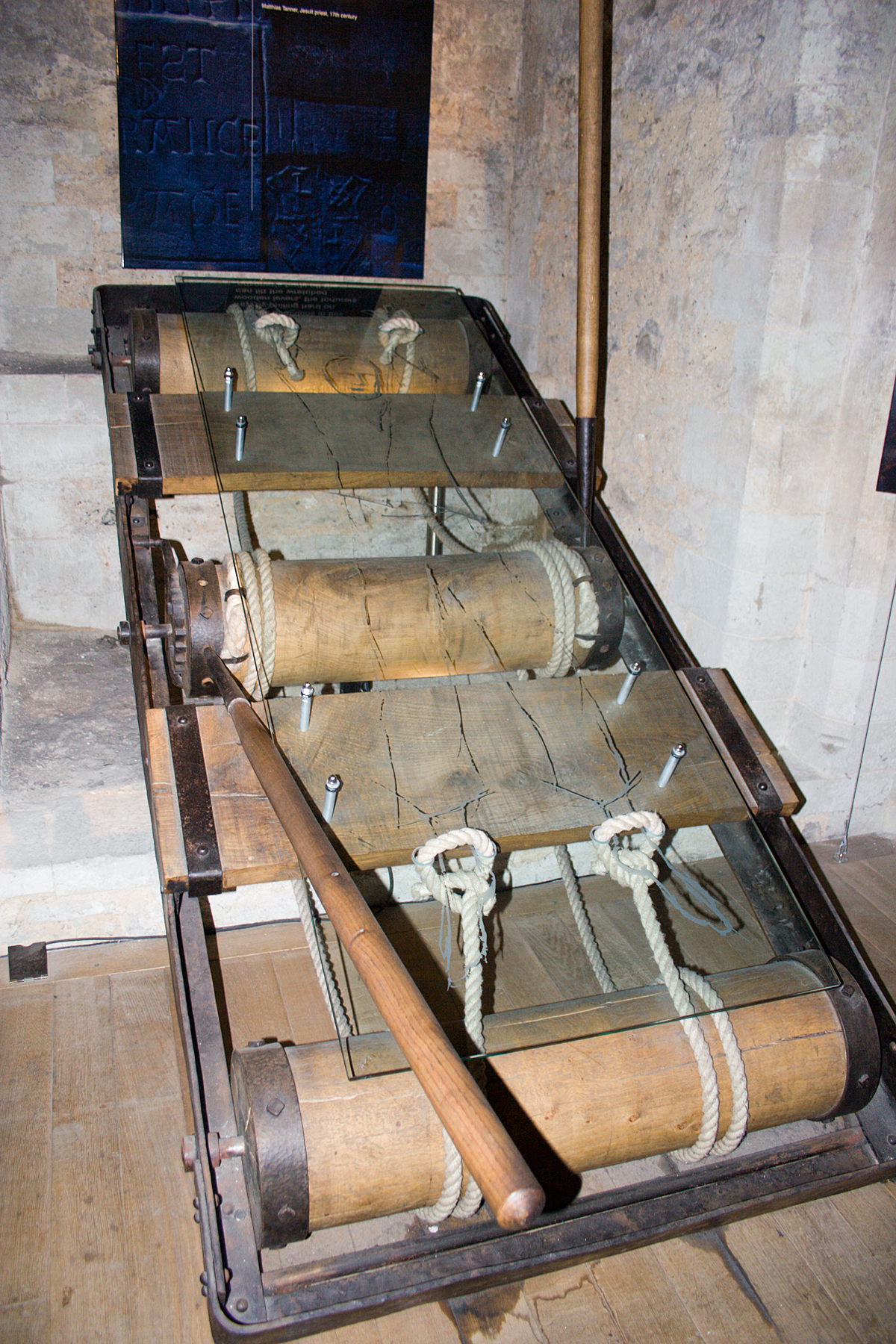
A torture rack, photographed in the Tower of London, England.

The Duke of Exeter's daughter was a torture rack in the Tower of London. Its presence is said to have been due to Henry Holland, 3rd Duke of Exeter, constable of the Tower in 1451, whence it got its name.

Blackstone wrote in c. 1765 (Commentaries, ii. sec. 326):

The trial by rack is utterly unknown to the law of England, though once when the dukes of Exeter and Suffolk, and other ministers of Henry VI, had laid a design to introduce the civil (i.e. Roman) law into the kingdom as the rule of government, for a beginning thereof they erected a rack for torture, which was called in derision the Duke of Exeter's daughter, and still remains in the Tower of London. Where in Queen Elizabeth's reign it was used as an engine of state, not of law, more than once. But when in the reign of Charles I, upon the assassination of Villiers, duke of Buckingham, by John Felton, it was proposed in the privy council to put the assassin to the rack, in order to discover his accomplices, the judges being consulted, declared unanimously that no such proceeding was allowable by the laws of England.
