= Rack (torture) =

Torture device

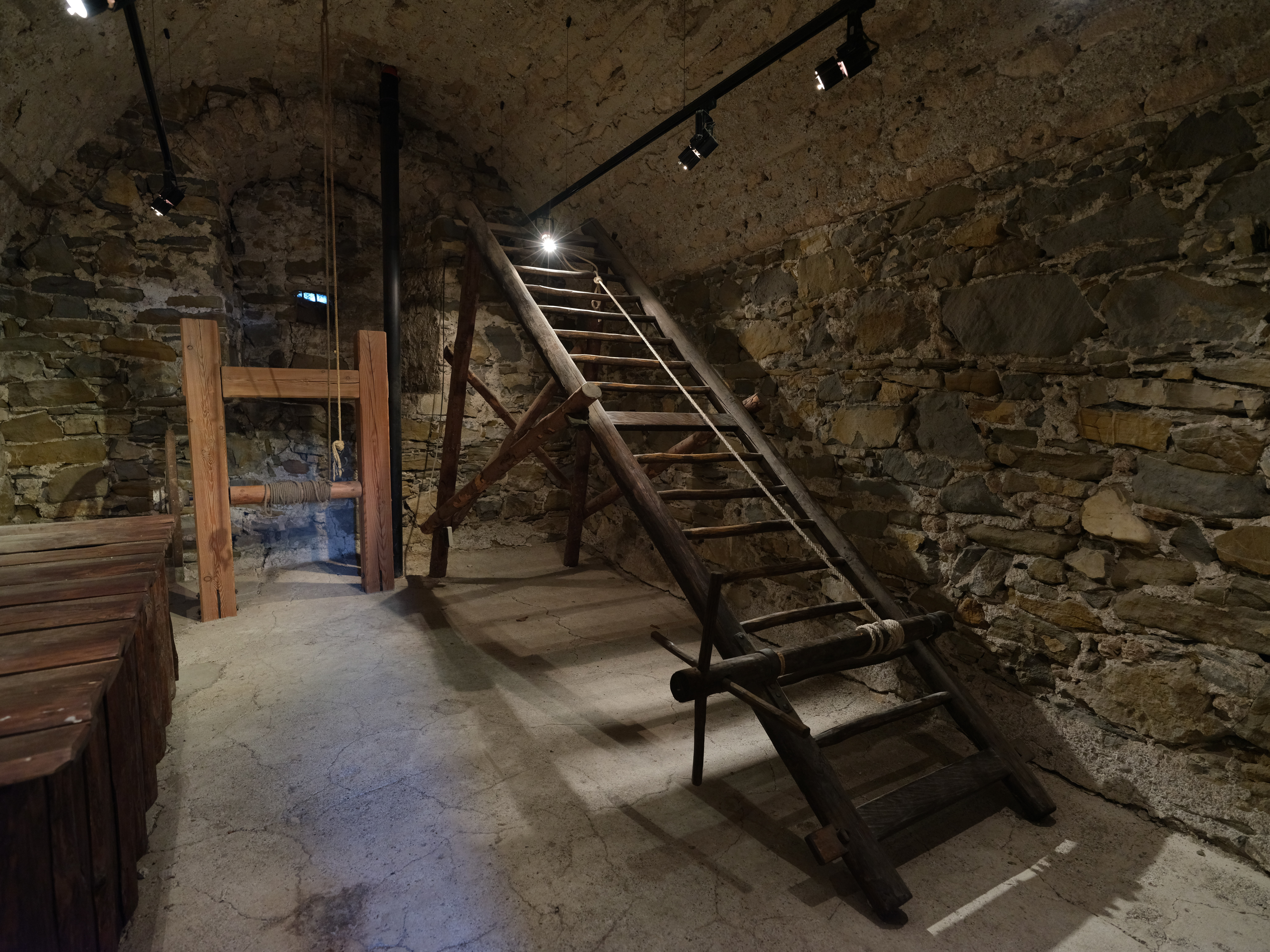
A torture rack in Rothschild Castle, Austria

The rack is a torture device consisting of a rectangular, usually wooden frame, slightly raised from the ground, with a roller at one or both ends. The victim's ankles are fastened to one roller and the wrists are chained to the other. As the interrogation progresses, a handle and ratchet mechanism attached to the top roller is used to very gradually retract the chains, slowly increasing the strain on the prisoner's shoulders, hips, knees, and elbows and causing excruciating pain. By means of pulleys and levers, this roller could be rotated on its own axis, thus straining the ropes until the sufferer's joints were dislocated and eventually separated.

== Uses ==
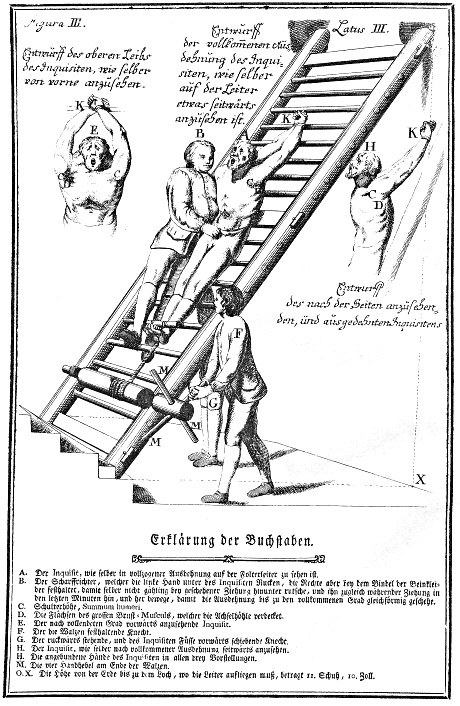
Constitutio Criminalis Theresiana (1768) – the approved methods of torture which could be used by the legal authorities to arrive at the truth.

It is unclear exactly from which civilization the rack originated; the earliest examples are from Greece. The Greeks may have first used the rack as a means of torturing slaves and non-citizens, and later in special cases, as in 356 BC, when it was applied to gain a confession from Herostratus, an arsonist who was later executed for burning down the Temple of Artemis at Ephesus, one of the Seven Wonders of the Ancient World. Arrian's Anabasis of Alexander states that Alexander the Great had the pages who conspired to assassinate him, along with their mentor, his court historian Callisthenes, tortured on the rack in 328 BC.

According to Tacitus, the rack was used in a vain attempt to extract the names of the conspirators to assassinate Emperor Nero in the Pisonian conspiracy from the freedwoman Epicharis in 65 A.D. The next day, after refusing to talk, she was dragged back to the rack on a chair (all of her limbs were dislocated, so she could not stand), but strangled herself on a loop of cord on the back of the chair on the way. The rack, in Roman sources, was referred to with the name equuleus; the word fidicula, more commonly the name of a small lyre or stringed instrument, was used to describe a similar torture device, although its exact design has been lost.

The rack was also used on early Christians, such as St. Vincent (304 A.D.), and mentioned by the Church Fathers Tertullian and St. Jerome (420 A.D.).

The attached image illustrates how prisoners on the rack were often burned with torches held to their sides or armpits to enhance the cruelty of the torture. Slivers of red-hot coal were also commonly slid between the toes.

=== Britain ===
Its first appearance in England is said to have been due to John Holland, 2nd Duke of Exeter, the constable of the Tower in 1447, and it was thus popularly known as "the Duke of Exeter's daughter".

The Protestant martyr Anne Askew, daughter of Sir William Askew, Knight of Lincolnshire, was tortured on the rack before her execution in 1546 (age 25). She was so damaged by the torture on the rack that she had to be carried on a chair to her burning at the stake. The accusations against her were from: (1) the Bishop's Chancellor Edmund Bonner, who claimed that women were not allowed to speak the Scriptures, and (2) the Bishop of Winchester Stephen Gardiner, because she would not profess that the sacraments were the literal flesh, blood and bone of Christ; this despite the fact that the English Reformation had already begun a decade earlier.

The Catholic martyr Nicholas Owen, a noted builder of priest holes, died under torture on the rack in the Tower of London in 1606. Guy Fawkes is also thought to have been put to the rack, since a royal warrant authorising his torture survives. The warrant states that "lesser tortures" should be applied to him at first, but if he remained recalcitrant he could be racked.

In 1615 a clergyman called Edmond Peacham, accused of high treason, was racked.

In 1628 the question of its legality was raised in connection with a proposal in the Privy Council to rack John Felton, the assassin of George Villiers, the 1st Duke of Buckingham. The judges resisted this, unanimously declaring its use to be contrary to the laws of England. The previous year Charles I had authorised the Irish courts to rack a Catholic priest; this seems to have been the last time the rack was used in Ireland. In the aftermath of the attack on Lambeth Palace, 1640, John Archer, supposed by the authorities to be a leader of the mob, becomes the last person in England to be tortured on the rack (in the Tower of London), on the orders of Charles I, but does not reveal any other names.

In 1679 Miles Prance, a silversmith who was being questioned about the murder of the respected magistrate Sir Edmund Berry Godfrey, was threatened with the rack.

=== Russia ===
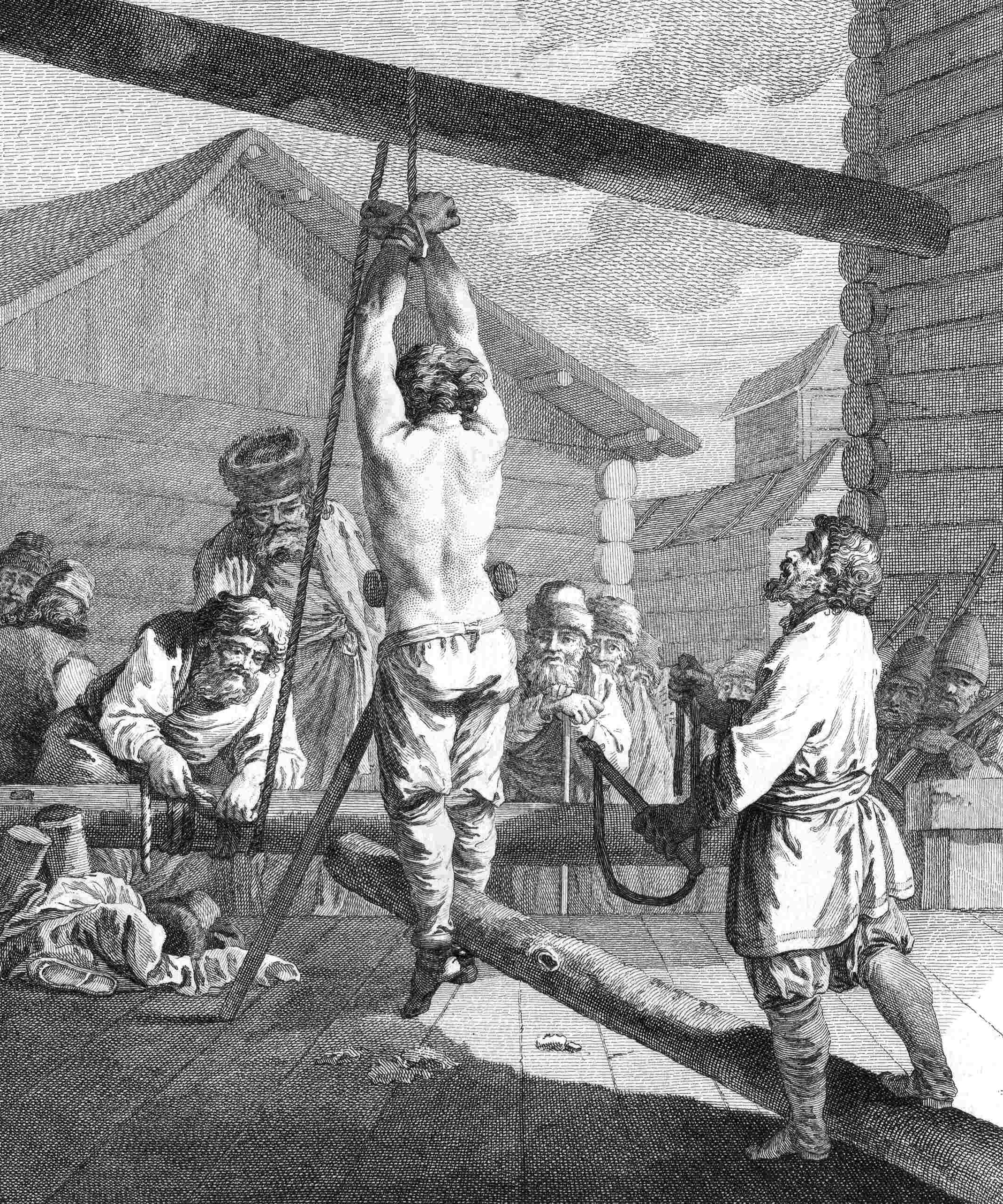
"Punishment with a Great Knout"

In Russia up to the 18th century the rack (дыба, dyba) was a gallows-like device for suspending the victims (strappado). The suspended victims were whipped with a knout and sometimes burned with torches.

== See also ==
- Duke of Exeter's daughter
- Procrustes
- Strappado
- Breaking on the wheel

== Sources ==
- Monestier, M. (1994) Peines de mort. Paris, France: Le Cherche Midi Éditeur.
- Crocker, Harry W.; Triumph: The Power and Glory of the Catholic Church - A 2,000 Year History
