= Flavius Scaevinus =

1st century Roman praetorian tribune and quaestor

Flavius Scaevinus, a praetorian tribune and quaestor, was a member of the Pisonian conspiracy against Nero. It was through his freedman Milichus that Nero discovered the conspiracy. Afterwards, history is silent on the fate of Flavius, with some sources saying he was a consul under Otho, then exiled by Vitellius. Tacitus merely states that he "perished" after the conspiracy was exposed. This has been taken to mean he was executed.

== Sources ==
- Tacitus, Annals xv. 49, 54, 55, 70
