= Proscription in ancient Rome =

Official declarations of state enemies

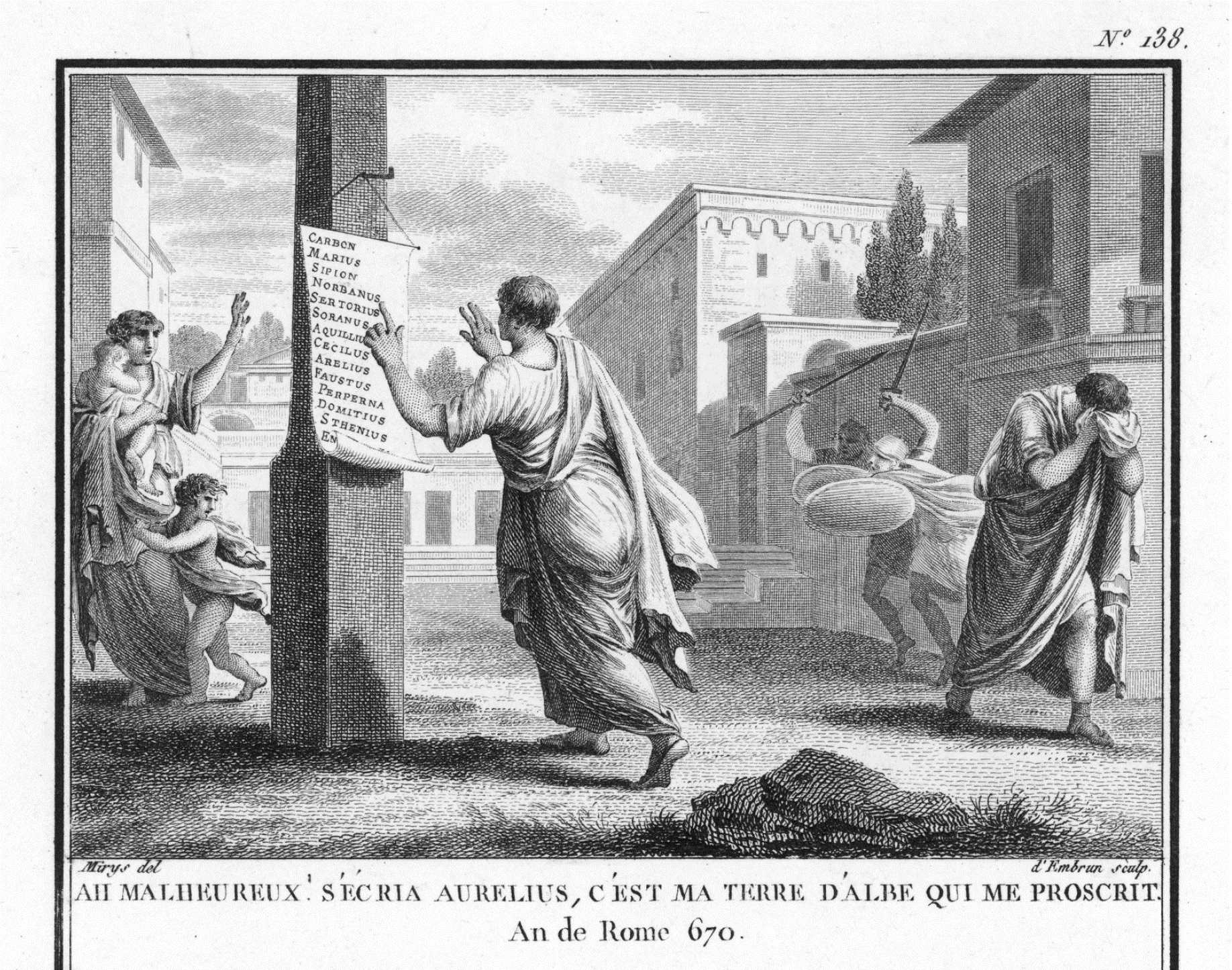
The Proscriptions of Sulla

Proscriptions in ancient Rome were official lists of individuals declared enemies of the state, whose property was confiscated and whose lives were forfeit. Although the Latin term proscriptio originally referred to public notices or advertisements, it gained a darker political meaning during the late Roman Republic, beginning with the dictatorship of Sulla in 82–81 BC, when it became a systematic method for eliminating rivals, punishing alleged treason, and redistributing wealth through state-sanctioned executions and confiscations. Later employed on a larger scale by the Second Triumvirate of Octavian, Mark Antony, and Lepidus in 43 BC, proscriptions stripped the condemned of citizenship and legal protection, encouraged informers with rewards, and financed political and military ambitions through seized estates. While presented as measures to protect the state, they became symbols of political terror and the erosion of republican legal norms during Rome's era of civil wars.

Proscriptions (Latin proscriptio, plural proscriptiones) initially meant public advertisements or notices signifying property or goods for sale. During the dictatorship of Sulla in 82 BC the word took on a more sinister meaning when he instituted a purge of his opponents by instituting a notice for the sale of confiscated property belonging to those declared public enemies of the state as well as condemned to death those proscribed, called proscripti in Latin.

== Treason ==
There were multiple reasons why the ancient Roman government may have adopted proscription. The Law of Majesty (lex maiestatis), or treason crime consisted of a range of measures. This included assisting an enemy in any way (crimen laesae majestasis), acts of subversion and usurpation, offenses against the peace of the state, offenses against the administration of justice, and violation of absolute duties. Overall, crimes in which the state, emperor, or the state's tranquility were implicated, or offenses against the good of the people, would be considered treason, and, therefore, would invoke proscription. Some of these measures were comparable to the public safety laws of modern times. Others, like violating absolute duties, could arise from accident or circumstance but would invoke punishment regardless.

Punishment for treason was harsh and meant to highlight the seriousness and shamefulness of the crime committed. There were a variety of punishments for capital crimes, including death, loss of freedman status, loss of citizenship with a loss of family rights, or loss of family rights only. Death was a very common punishment and was referred to as summum supplicium, or the "extreme penalty". Death was often the punishment for all but the mildest forms of treason. The so-called "interdiction from water and fire" was a civil excommunication practically resulting in exile, which included forfeiture of citizenship and property. The condemned would be deported to an island. Emperor Augustus frequently employed this method of exile as it kept banished men from banding together in groups. This punishment was reserved for only the mildest forms of treason, however, the death penalty invoked for most other cases.

== Marian Purges ==
Violence associated with later proscriptions had earlier precedents during the return of Marius and Cinna to Rome in 87 BC, when a limited purge targeted political opponents rather than the wider population. After Cinna restored Marius and the Sullan exiles, forces under Gaius Marcius Censorinus killed the consul Octavius and displayed his head - the first time a consul's head was given as a prize to another Roman and an episode often seen as anticipating later proscription practices. Several prominent figures, including Gaius and Lucius Julius Caesar, Publius Licinius Crassus, and Marcus Antonius, were killed without trial, while Merula and Quintus Lutatius Catulus faced prosecution and committed suicide. Modern scholarship generally treats these killings as politically motivated reprisals rather than formal proscriptions, lacking public lists, rewards, or hereditary penalties, despite later hostile sources portraying widespread massacres.

== Sulla's dictatorship ==
The first instance in Rome of mass proscription took place in 82 BC, under the dictator Sulla who drew up a list of supporters of his populist rivals, Gaius Marius and his son who he considered enemies of the state. After the Senate refused to agree to it, he had the assembly agree to it and published the list in the Roman Forum. Any man whose name appeared on the list was ipso facto stripped of his citizenship and excluded from all protection under the law; reward money was given to those who killed proscribed men as well as informers.

Sulla used proscription to restore the depleted Roman Treasury (Aerarium), which had been drained by costly civil and foreign wars in the preceding decade, and to eliminate enemies (both real and potential) of his reformed state and constitutions; the plutocratic knights of the Ordo Equester were particularly hard-hit.

The proscription lists created by Sulla led to mass terror in Rome. Some modern historians estimate about 520 people were proscribed as opposed to the ancient estimate of 4,700 people. During this time, "the cities of Italy became theaters of execution." Citizens were terrified to find their names on the lists. Those whose names were listed were ultimately sentenced to death. The executions were brutal and consisted of beheading. Often, the heads were then displayed on spears in the Forum. The bodies of the condemned were often mutilated and dragged before being thrown into the Tiber River.

Negative consequences arose for anyone that chose to assist those on the list, despite not being listed on the proscribed lists themselves. Anyone who was found guilty of assisting the condemned was executed.

Additionally, those who were condemned lost rights even after their death, denied the right to a funeral, with their possessions were auctioned off, often to the ones who killed them, and their children not being allowed to inherit the proscribed's property. Descendants were unable to seek public office.

== Second Triumvirate ==
The proscriptions of the Second Triumvirate were a series of political purges initiated in 43 BC by Octavian, Mark Antony, and Lepidus to avenge Julius Caesar’s assassination, eliminate rivals, and seize wealth during the Roman civil wars. Following their agreement, lists naming around 2,000 individuals - including senators, equestrians, and prominent republicans such as Cicero - were published, with rewards offered for killing or betraying those proscribed and confiscation of their property. While some victims were spared through personal connections, many were executed, and ancient historians later debated which triumvir bore the greatest responsibility, with sources such as Appian, Cassius Dio, Suetonius and Plutarch presenting differing interpretations of Octavian’s role and the brutal political bargaining behind the purge.

== Bibliography ==
- Alexander, Michael (1990). Trials in the late Roman republic, 149 BC to 50 BC. Phoenix. Vol. 26. University of Toronto Press. ISBN 0-8020-5787-X.
- Hinard, François (1985). Les proscriptions de la Rome républicaine (in French). Rome: Ecole française de Rome. ISBN 2728300941.
- Lovano, Michael (2002). The age of Cinna: crucible of late republican Rome. Stuttgart: Franz Steiner Verlag. ISBN 978-3-515-07948-8.
- Seager, Robin (1992). "Sulla". In Crook, John; et al. (eds.). The last age of the Roman Republic, 146–43 BC. Cambridge Ancient History. Vol. 9 (2nd ed.). Cambridge University Press. pp. 165–207. ISBN 0-521-85073-8. OCLC 121060.
- Scott, Kenneth (1933). "The Political Propaganda of 44–30 B.C.". Memoirs of the American Academy in Rome. 11: 7–49. JSTOR 4238573.
