= Pisonian conspiracy =

Roman conspiracy against Emperor Nero (AD 65)

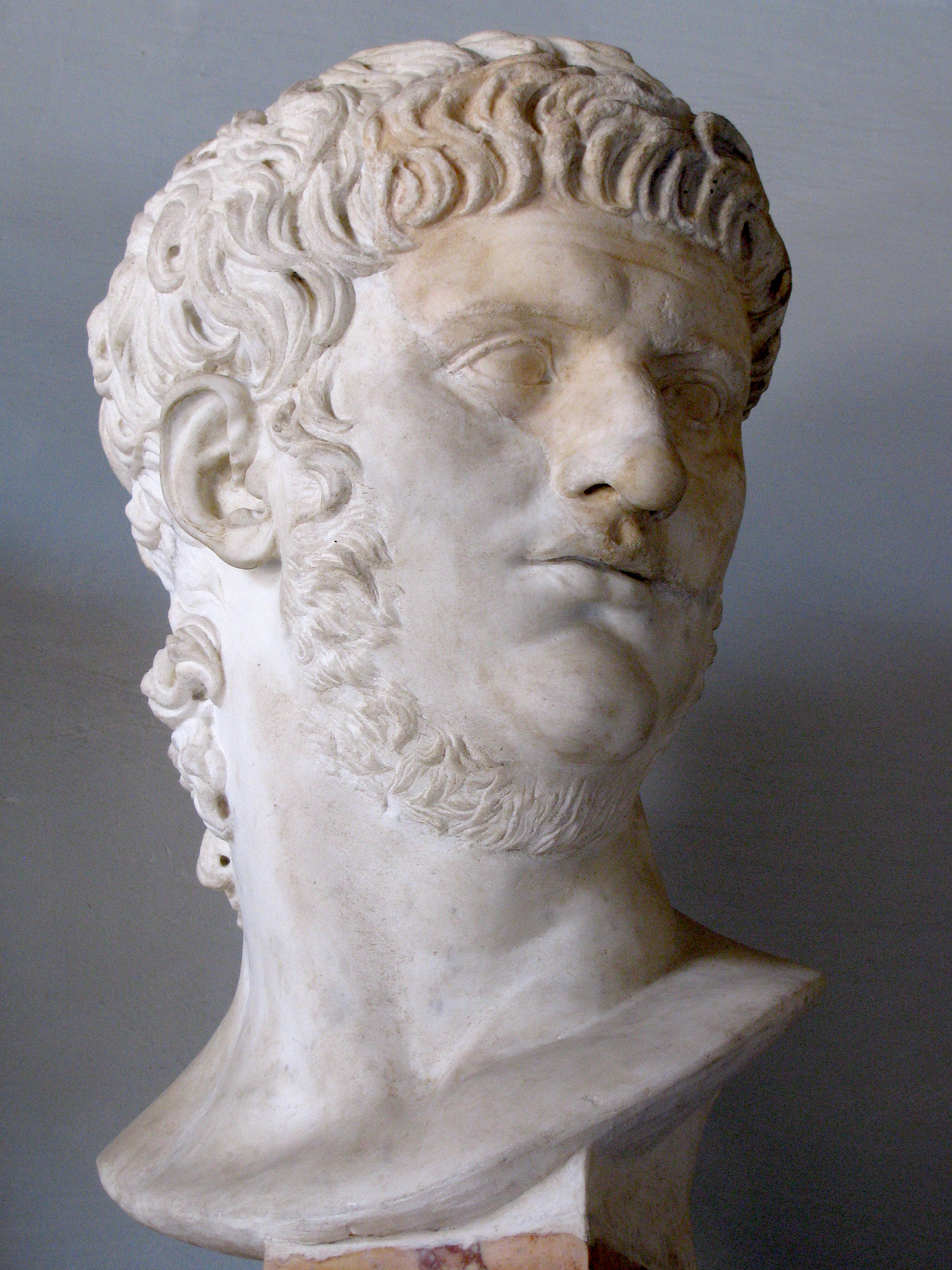
Bust of the emperor Nero (reigned AD 54–68).

The conspiracy of Gaius Calpurnius Piso in 65 AD was a major turning point in the reign of the Roman emperor Nero (reign 54–68). The plot reflected the growing discontent among the ruling class of the Roman state with Nero's increasingly despotic leadership, and as a result is a significant event on the road toward his eventual suicide and the chaos of the Year of the Four Emperors which followed.

== Plot ==
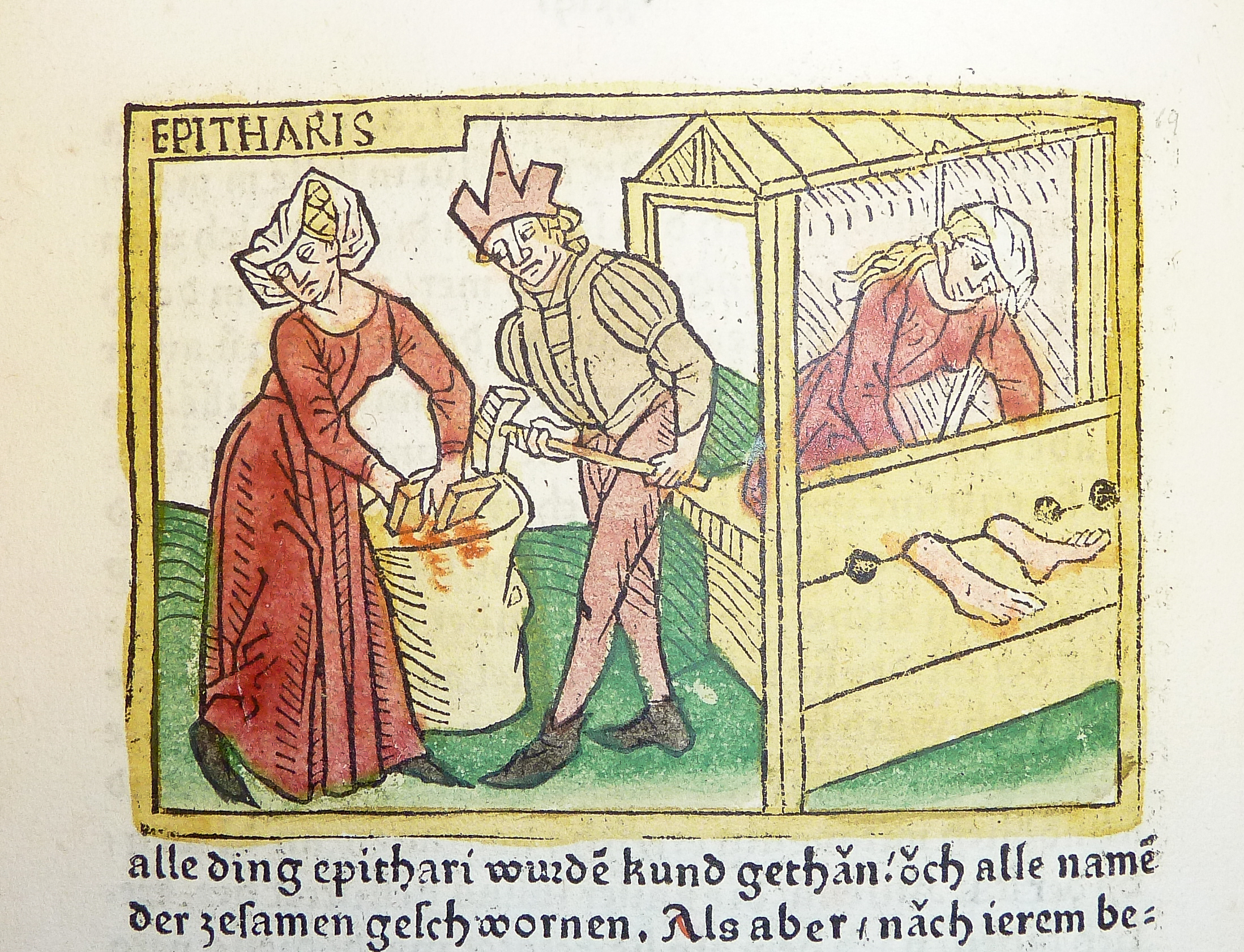
The torture of Epicharis, from a 15th-century woodcut.

Gaius Calpurnius Piso, a leading Roman statesman, benefactor of literature, and orator, intended to have Nero assassinated, and replace him as emperor through acclamation by the Praetorian Guard. The conspiracy emerged in AD 65, enlisting the support of several prominent senators, equestrians, and soldiers. According to the Roman historian Tacitus, the ringleaders included a Praetorian tribune named Subrius Flavus, and a centurion named Sulpicius Asper, who helped Piso devise the plot, among others. The conspirators were said to have varying motives. Some wished to replace Nero with a better emperor; others wished to be free of emperors altogether, and to restore a purely republican form of government.

The conspiracy was put in jeopardy by a woman named Epicharis, who divulged parts of the plan to Volusius Proculus, commanding a fleet in Misenum. Epicharis was involved with the conspiracy and was attempting to move it along faster. When Proculus complained to Epicharis that Nero did not favor him, she informed him of the conspiracy. Proculus informed Nero of the conspiracy and Epicharis was arrested. Though she denied the accusations, the conspiracy collapsed and Epicharis was tortured brutally. While on transport to be tortured a second time, she committed suicide by strangling herself with her girdle. The conspirators, acting more quickly, rejected a plan to kill Nero at Baiae, but settled on murdering him in Rome at the games. They had a loosely conceived plan in which Faenius Rufus – joint prefect of the Praetorian Guard with Ofonius Tigellinus – would conduct Piso to the Praetorian Camp, where the Guard would acclaim him as emperor.

On the morning that the conspirators' plot was to be carried out – 19 April – a freedman named Milichus informed on his former master, Flavius Scaevinus, after receiving orders to sharpen a knife and prepare bandages. Tacitus attributes his decision to give his former master up to greed for boundless wealth and power; although he was not fully convinced until his wife reminded him that there were other witnesses to Scaevinus' conspiracy. Milichus' silence, she argued, would be useless and dangerous if he were not the one to report the plot. Milichus reported to Nero's secretary, Epaphroditus, bringing the blade he had been tasked with preparing as evidence. Scaevinus initially was able to avoid suspicion, discrediting the evidence as circumstantial before giving in under the threat of torture and further evidence from Milichus' wife reporting on a long secret meeting between Scaevinus and Antonius Natalis, another conspirator. When Scaevinus was given over to fellow conspirator praetorian prefect Faenius Rufus for punishment, he inculpated him as well; another conspirator, Subrius Flavus, openly expressed his hatred of Nero in court, justifying with reference to Nero's matricide, crimes, and "parad[ing] as a charioteer [and] actor".

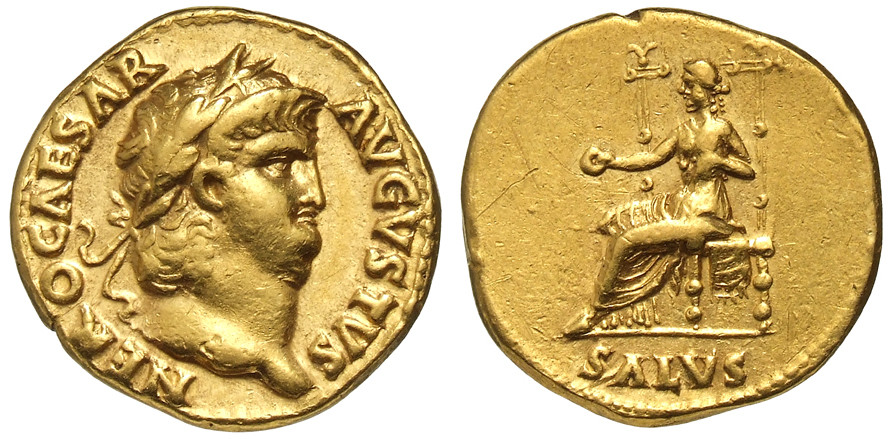
Gold coin of AD 65/66, with the figure of Salus (public safety), most likely struck to celebrate the suppression of the plot.

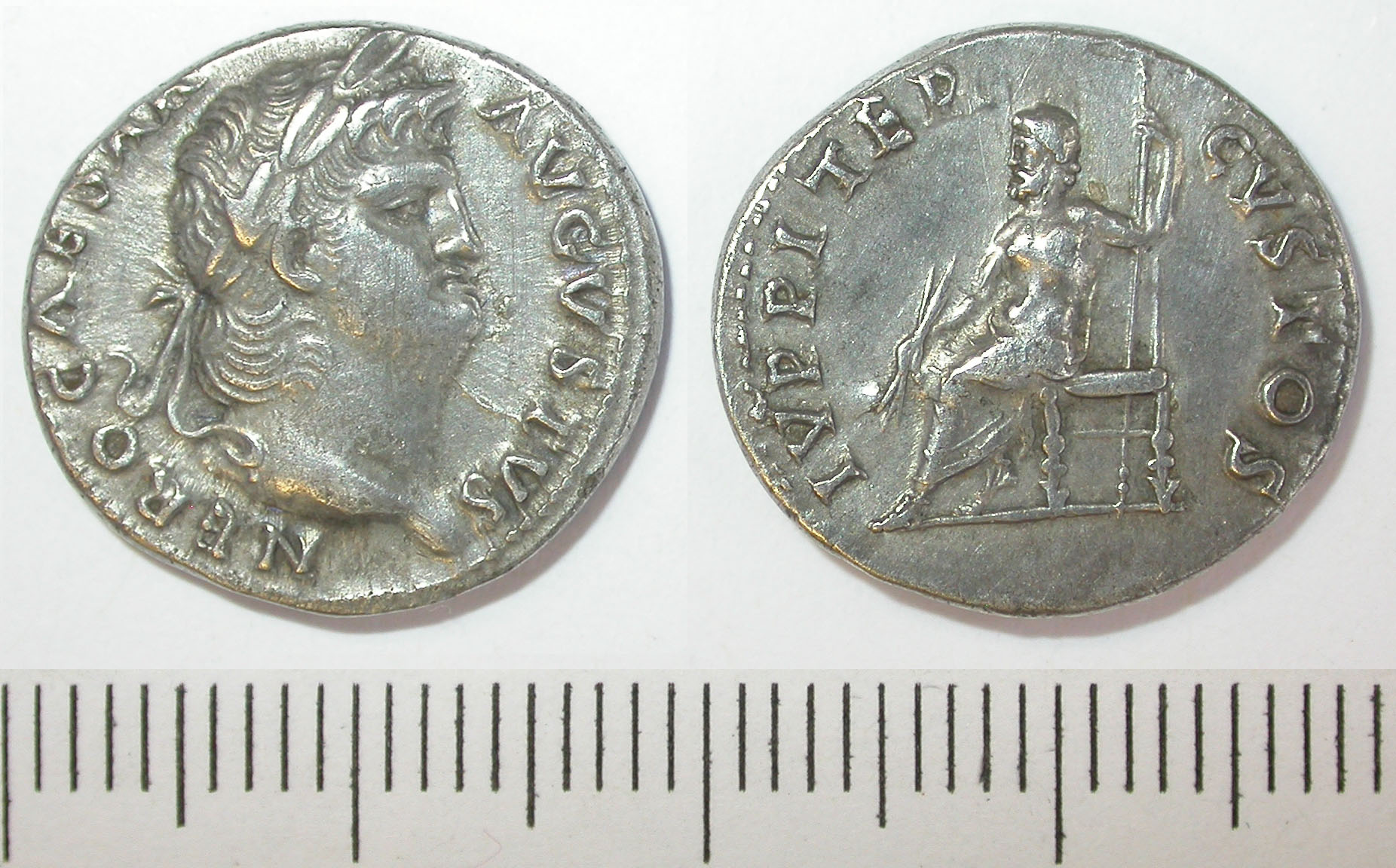
Silver denarius of AD 67–68. The reverse reads IVPPITER CVSTOS, "Jupiter the guardian," probably referring to Nero's having survived the plot against him.

Nero ordered Piso, the philosopher Seneca the Younger, Seneca's nephew Marcus Annaeus Lucanus (Lucan) and the satirist Petronius to commit suicide. Many others were also killed. In Plutarch's version, one of the conspirators remarked to a condemned prisoner that all would change soon (because Nero would be dead). The prisoner reported the conversation to Nero, who had the conspirator tortured until he confessed the plot. The ancient Roman historian Tacitus writes in his Annals that "it was rumoured that Subrius Flavus and the centurions had decided in private conference... that, once Nero had been struck down by the agency of Piso, Piso should be disposed of... and the empire made over to Seneca; who would thus appear to have been chosen for the supreme power by innocent men".

== Named conspirators ==
At least 41 individuals were accused of being part of the conspiracy. Of the known 41, there were 19 senators, seven equites, 11 soldiers, and four women.

=== Executed or forced to commit suicide ===
Piso, Plautius Lateranus, Lucan, Afranius Quintianus, Flavius Scaevinus, Claudius Senecio, Vulcatius Araricus, Julius Augurinus, Munatius Gratus, Marcius Festus, Faenius Rufus, Subrius Flavus, Sulpicius Asper, Maximus Scaurus, Venetus Paulus, Epicharis, Seneca the Younger, Antonia, Marcus Julius Vestinus Atticus.

=== Exiled or denigrated ===
Novius Priscus, Annius Pollio, Publius Glitius Gallus, Rufrius Crispinus, Verginius Flavus, Musonius Rufus, Cluvidienus Quietus, Julius Agrippa, Blitius Catulinus, Petronius Pricus, Julius Altinus, Caesennius Maximus, Caedicia (wife of Flavius Scaevinus).

=== Pardoned or acquitted ===
Antonius Natalis, Cervarius Proculus, Statius Proximus (but afterwards committed suicide), Gavius Silvanus (also afterwards committed suicide), Acilia Lucana.

== Modern fiction ==
The Polish writer Henryk Sienkiewicz, in his book Quo Vadis. used many of the themes, while the setting took place in the time of the plot. In the last scene of the book, one of the plotters, Petronius, committed suicide after having a lavish party.

The novel by Naomi Mitchison, The Blood of the Martyrs (1939), is set in the months leading up to the failure of the conspiracy.

It is the topic of John Hersey's epistolary novel The Conspiracy (1972).
