= Red bean =

Red bean is a common name for several varieties of beans and plants and may refer to:

- Small red beans, also known as "Mexican red beans," "Central American red beans," and "New Orleans red beans"
- Adzuki bean (Vigna angularis), commonly used in Japanese, Korean, and Chinese cuisine, particularly as red bean paste
- Kidney bean, a light or dark red variety of Phaseolus vulgaris
- Vigna umbellata, a species of legume whose seeds are red
- Dysoxylum rufum, a rainforest tree in the Mahogany family
- Didymocheton muelleri, a rainforest tree

== See also ==
- Red Beans (album), a 1976 album by Jimmy McGriff
