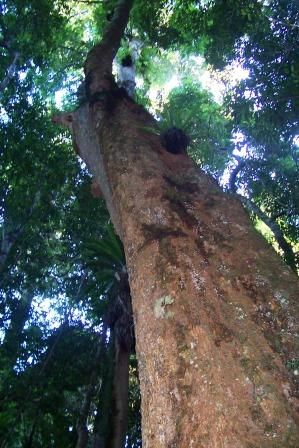
- At Boorganna Nature Reserve, Australia

Conservation status
- Least Concern (IUCN 3.1)

Scientific classification
- Kingdom: Plantae
- Clade: Embryophytes
- Clade: Tracheophytes
- Clade: Spermatophytes
- Clade: Angiosperms
- Clade: Eudicots
- Clade: Rosids
- Order: Sapindales
- Family: Meliaceae
- Genus: Didymocheton
- Species: D. fraserianus

Binomial name
- Didymocheton fraserianus (A.Juss.) Mabb. & Hauenschild

Synonyms
- List: Alliaria fraseriana Kuntze (1891); Alliaria lessertiana Kuntze (1891); Alliaria pubescens (Benth.) Kuntze (1891), nom. superfl.; Cambania fraseriana (A.Juss.) M.Roem. (1846); Dysoxylon fraserianum Benth. orth. var.; Dysoxylon lessertianum Benth. orth. var.; Dysoxylon lessertianum var. pubescens Benth. orth. var.; Dysoxylum fraserianum (A.Juss.) Benth. (1863); Dysoxylum becklerianum C.DC. (1878); Dysoxylum fraseranum Benth. orth. var.; Dysoxylum lessertianum (A.Juss.) Benth. (1863); Dysoxylum lessertianum var. pubescens Benth. (1863); Dysoxylum ptychocarpum Radlk. (1879); Epicharis fraseriana (A.Juss.) C.DC. (1878); Epicharis lessertiana (A.Juss.) C.DC. (1875); Hartighsea fraseriana A.Juss. (1830); Hartighsea lessertiana A.Juss. (1830); Macrocheton lessertianum (A.Juss.) M.Roem. (1846); Schleichera ptychocarpa F.Muell. (1875)

= Didymocheton fraserianus =

Species of tree

Didymocheton fraserianus, commonly known as rosewood or rose mahogany, is a medium-sized to large tree native to New South Wales and Queensland. It is widely used with the purpose of street design and to provide shade in the eastern suburbs of Sydney. Rosewood ranges from the rainforest around eastern Australia from Bundaberg in Queensland to Wyong in New South Wales. At maturity, it can reach a height of 57 metres (200 ft). It is generally known for its strong scent of rose from its bark.

Rosewood is a highly adaptable plant. It can grow in different site conditions, growing close to mountain ranges, basalt, and the volcanic basin. The species can also tolerate drought, frost, and salt. It is a typical long-lived but slow-growing species at the beginning. However, satisfying the growing condition of suitable temperature, humidity, and fertile soil can speed up its growth. Also, it is used commercially for the quality of its wood, in building high-end furniture and construction. Further studies have also been conducting, focusing on exploring more about its usage in essential oil.

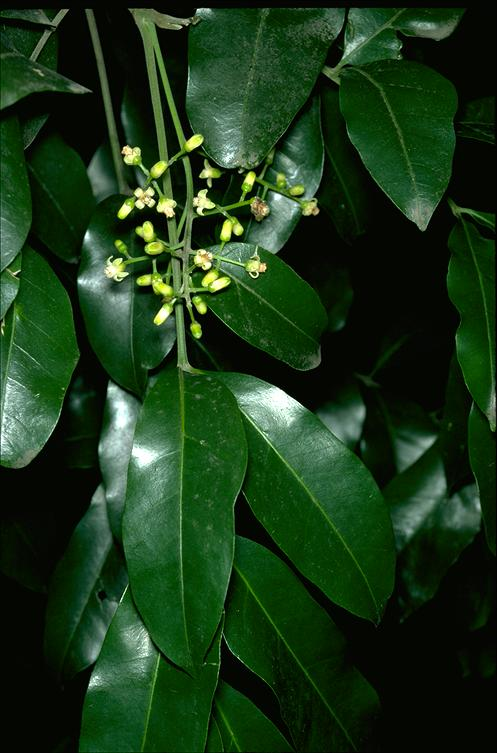
Flowers in the Royal Botanic Gardens Victoria

== Description ==
Didymocheton fraserianus is an evergreen tree that typically grows to a height of 30 m (98 ft), with a trunk up to 1.2 m (3 ft 11 in) in diameter. The largest D. fraserianus in New South Wales is 56.9 m (186.7 ft) tall and has a trunk 3.55 m (11.6 ft) in diameter. The size of the tree can vary depending on the growing conditions. Trees that grow under poor and unfavorable conditions can only grow half that height. Few specific features of D. franserianum differentiate it from the others. The stem can grow more than 1m in diameter, and it is not buttressed but flanged at the base. The bark is light brown with a scale-like outline, while the underbark is reddish-brown with non-uniform lighter colored lines. The shape of the crown is round with the standard dark green color, usually dense and shiny.

The leaves are arranged in spirals along the branchlets, glossy green and 120–250 mm (4.7–9.8 in) long on a petiole 20–80 mm (0.79–3.15 in) long. The leaves are paripinnate with between four and twelve leaflets, each leaflet elliptic to egg-shaped with the narrower end towards the base, 40–110 mm (1.6–4.3 in) long and 15–40 mm (0.59–1.57 in) wide on a petiolule 1–3 mm (0.039–0.118 in) long. The flowers are arranged in thyrses 50–120 mm (2.0–4.7 in) long, more or less sessile, and sweetly scented. The sepals are fused at the base forming a cup-shape about 3 mm (0.12 in) in diameter with four or five lobes. There are usually four white to pinkish, oblong to egg-shaped petals 5–7 mm (0.20–0.28 in) long and joined at their base to the stamens. Flowering occurs from April to August and the fruit is a cream-coloured and pink, oval capsule 15–25 mm (0.59–0.98 in) long and 10–20 mm (0.39–0.79 in) wide that is present from August to March and contains about four seeds.

== Taxonomy and naming ==
This species was first formally described in 1830 by Adrien-Henri de Jussieu who gave it the name Hartighsea fraseriana in Memoires du Museum d'Histoire Naturelle. In 1863, George Bentham changed the name to Dysoxylum fraserianum in Flora Australiensis. A study published in 2021 concluded that genus Dysoxylum was paraphyletic, and the species was placed in the revived genus Didymocheton as Didymocheton frasieranus.

The common names of Didymocheton fraserianus are Australian rosewood, rosewood, turnipwood, and its standard trade name, rose-mahogany. The former genus name Dysoxylum is derived from the Greek dys (ill-smelling) and xylon (wood), and the specific epithet (fraserianus) honours the colonial botanist Charles Fraser. The persistent scent in terms explains the origin behind the name rosewood. The name rosewood is most commonly used due to its strong fragrance of rose. The smell spreads from the freshly cut bark instead of the wood.

Dysoxylon franserianus is a member of the mahogany family, Meliaceae. Fourteen related species are spread across Australia, and most keep 'mahogany' as their common names. Aside from rosewood, other species include Didymocheton setosus, Dysoxylum oppositifolium (pink mahogany), and Epicharis parasitica (yellow mahogany). The only two species of rosewood that can be seen in New South Wales are Didymocheton muelleri and D. rufus, whilst the others are located in other areas spreading near the coast of Cairns and Queensland.

== Distribution and habitat ==
Didymocheton fraserianus grows in rainforest on the coast and ranges of eastern Australia from near Bundaberg in Queensland to Wyong in New South Wales. It is one of the most common species that can be found in the subtropical rainforest of Australia. There are around 80 different species of the genus spreading from India to Australia and New Zealand. Among the 80, nine species can only be found in Australia, inhabiting sub-tropical and tropical areas and coastal ranges. The species is most commonly seen in the rainforest of Dorrigo Plateau, Richmond, and MacPherson Ranges in New South Wales. Rosewood today is very common, familiar as a street tree especially in the eastern suburbs of Sydney. The species is extensively logged due to its colour and fragrance.

Didymocheton fraserianus first appeared in Queensland's suburban gardens and street in the 1970s. Didymocheton fraserianus is easy to grow under most of the conditions. Aside from the rainforest, other typical sites for habitats include flat and 10-15% gradient slope near mountain ranges. Basalt and red volcanic soils near the volcanic basin on Mt. Warning are common sites for the trees to flourish due to their deep fertile soils. The tree takes a long time to grow in the beginning, but with a suitable environment (temperature, humidity, fertility of the soil), it can turn into a fast-growing tree, offering shade.

== Conservation ==
The species is listed as of "least concern" by the International Union for Conservation of Nature and under the Queensland Government Nature Conservation Act 1992. Other species of unrelated species with the common name rosewood occurring in Madagascar, Central America, Thailand and Vietnam are endangered due to extensive logging.

== Uses ==
=== Timber ===
The appearance of the wood is similar to mahogany. The major difference between the two is the pattern. Rosewood does not have growth rings, it has an interlocking grain with a zig-zag pattern. The colour of the NSW rosewood is deep pink towards red-brown, lighter than the heartwood, and it has a distinctive smell similar to the odor of rose when cut, planed, or drilled. Australian rosewood timber serves many purposes. The wood is very versatile and is consistent in color. It is most often used in construction, extending from plywood, external and internal joinery, flooring, framing, molding, to fine furniture. Due to the distinctive color, versatility, durability and its hardness, the timber is a popular option in building high-end furniture. Early from the 19th century, New South Wales used rosewood to furnish its Government House.

The timber is easy to clean and highly recyclable. With a few drops of denatured alcohol (methylated spirits), removing the blemish on the wood surface. It is a commercial species widely used in Australia because the wood can be easily reprocessed and reuse for different purposes, creating high availability. This species has termite resistance quality, making it suitable for indoor and outdoor construction purposes in preventing white ants. The timber can also serve a decorative purpose, such as wood inlay, woodturning, and carving into different shapes and objects.

During a burning splinter test, D. fraserianus burns to full white ash. The special color of the ash is different from that of other species that typically turn into charcoal. The distinctive aromatic odour of the timber and its reaction to flame distinguish rosewood from a closely related timber, miva mahogany.

The timber of D. fraserianus will be a favorable choice when an individual is seeking wood options that is easy to work with. It is harder than softwood, considered moderately hard, scoring 3 out of 6 on a class scale. Hand tools will be needed if indentation is required. Bending the wood of the species should be processed under caution because of its brittle nature; steam-bending can easily break the timber. When it is used in construction, pre-drilling is recommended to reduce the pressure on the wood.

The species' timber is widely used as the raw material for producing wine casks in the past. Different types of casks can slightly influence the flavour of the wine, Australian rosewood, adding little fragrance of rose. Rosewood is rarely used for this purpose now.

=== Health hazards associated with the use of rosewood timber ===
The dust of the rosewood may be toxic to humans. Continual or excessive exposure can increase the probability of allergy, triggering respiratory problems, sensitization and irritation, affecting the eyes, skin, and lungs. The inhalable wood dust level cannot surpass 1.0 mg/ m3 for mahogany, the dust may be harmful and cause cancer if the level exceeds the Permissible Exposure Limit (PEL).

Chemical structure alpha-cadinol that present in Didymocheton fraserianus

=== Essential oil ===
Since 2019, the Essential Oil Producers Association of Australia (EOPAA) has been studying the rainforest blue essential oil, composed through distillation from heartwood and the disposal cabinet timber. The oil has a saturated shade of blue due to the presence of guaiazulene in alpha-cadinol. The extracted oil spreads the pleasant fragrance of the Australian rainforest. However, the blue oil is not extensively used commercially due to its lack of standardization, imposing a challenge for the product to be produced and traded. EOPAA has been studying how to standardize Australian native oils and has been working on establishing further data on the Australian Native oils in the future.

== Lifecycle ==
Didymocheton fraserianus is a long lived yet slow growing species, flower and fruits florescence irregularly, it follows a cycle that can range from five to seven years. The rapid spread of rosewood in Australia is due to the prolific seeding capability (est. 10,000 seeds per plant), leading to high germination rate. Also, it grows well in most of the condition, the plant is drought resistant, frost, and salt tolerant. The plant grows really well under full sun exposure, but it needs shade when smaller. The pollination happens from wind and water. The seeding process take the longest, vary from 2 to 3 years depending on the condition, the plant will start to grow on a reasonable speed after it reaches 0.5 metres tall. The plant reaches the juvenile stage when it reaches 4-4.5 metres, the trunk looks like a stick approximately 7 cm across. To grow a moderate size Didymocheton fraserianus 57 m (187 ft) it will need three to four decades.

== Gallery ==
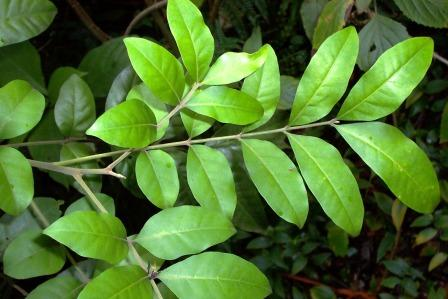
Foliage, Boorganna Nature Reserve

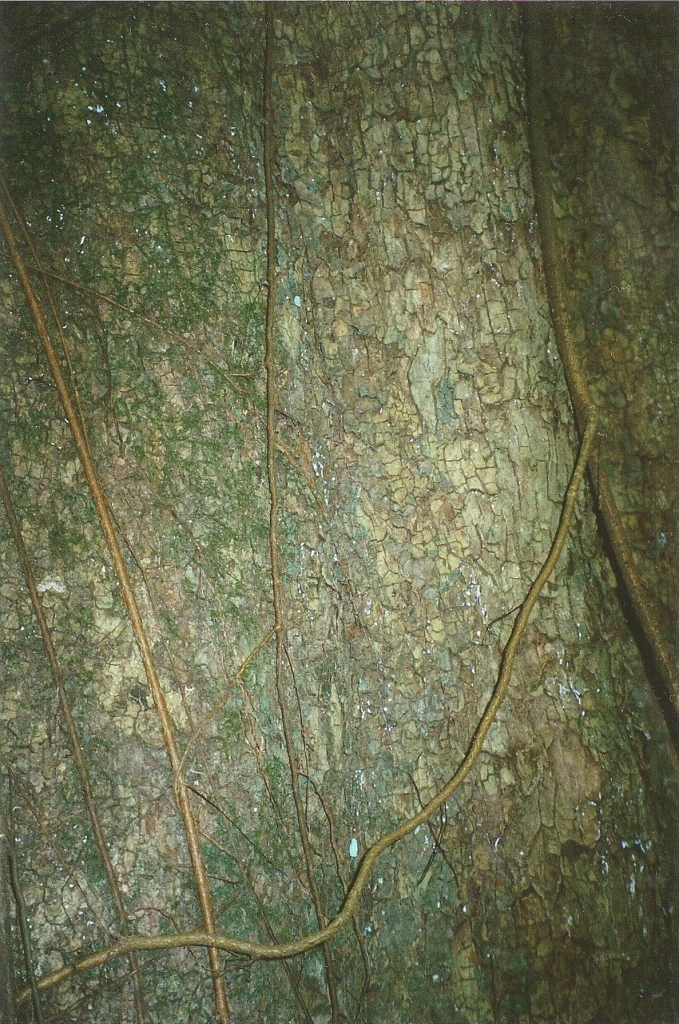
Bark, Toonumbar National Park

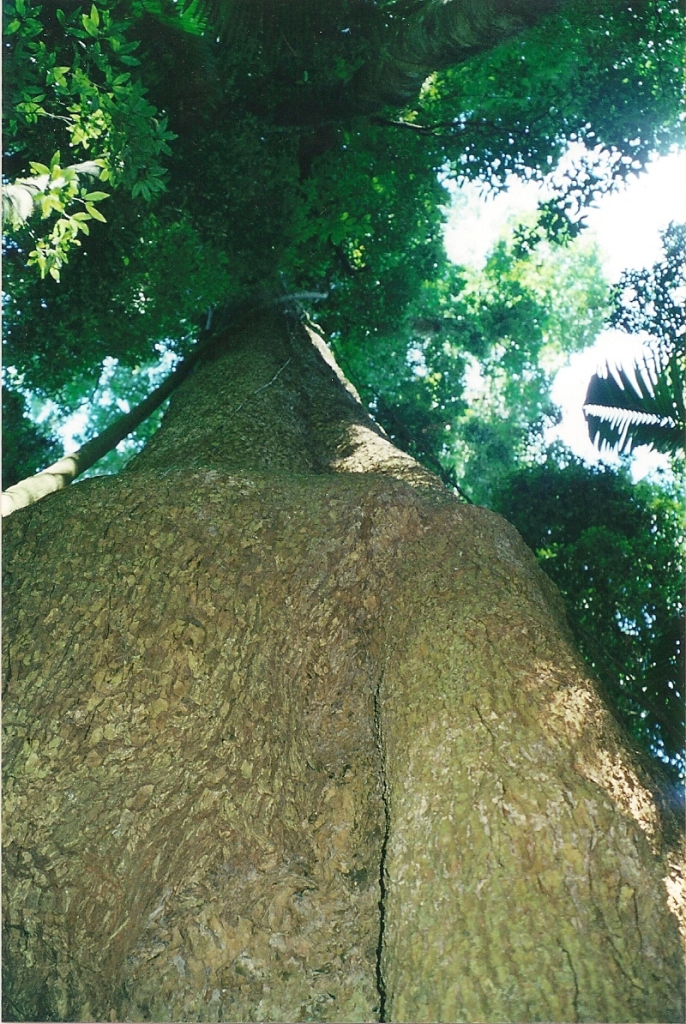
Giant tree, Border Ranges National Park
