= Didymocheton alliaceus =

Scientific classification
- Kingdom: Plantae
- Clade: Tracheophytes
- Clade: Angiosperms
- Clade: Eudicots
- Clade: Rosids
- Order: Sapindales
- Family: Meliaceae
- Genus: Didymocheton
- Species: D. alliaceus

Binomial name
- Didymocheton alliaceus (G.Forst.) Mabb. (2021)

Synonyms
- Synonymy: Dracontomelon pilosum Seem. (1865); Alliaria richii (A.Gray) Kuntze (1891); Alliaria samoensis (A.Gray) Kuntze (1891); Brucea quercifolia Seem. (1865); Didymocheton funkii (C.DC.) Harms (1940); Didymocheton quercifolius (Seem.) Holzmeyer & Hauenschild (2021); Didymocheton richii A.Gray (1854); Didymocheton samoensis (A.Gray) Holzmeyer & Hauenschild (2021); Dysoxylum abo Hosok. (1937); Dysoxylum alliaceum (G.Forst.) Seem. (1865), nom. illeg.; Dysoxylum forsteri C.DC. (1878); Dysoxylum funkii C.DC. (1906); Dysoxylum mollissimum var. halmaheirae Miq. (1868); Dysoxylum pilosum (Seem.) A.C.Sm. (1942); Dysoxylum quercifolium (Seem.) A.C.Sm. (1962); Dysoxylum richii (A.Gray) C.DC. (1878); Dysoxylum samoense A.Gray (1854); Dysoxylum trukense Kaneh. (1935), nom. nud.; Macrochiton forsteri M.Roem. (1846); Lussa quercifolia (Seem.) Kuntze (1891); Trichilia alliacea G.Forst. (1786)

Species of flowering plant

Didymocheton alliaceus is a species of flowering plant in the mahogany family, Meliaceae. It is a tree native to the tropical Pacific islands, ranging from the Solomon Islands to the Caroline Islands, Vanuatu, Fiji, Wallis and Futuna, Niue, Tonga, and the Samoan Islands. It is most closely related to Didymocheton mollissimus of Malesia and mainland Southeast Asia, D. mollis of the Bismarck Archipelago, New Guinea, and Sulawesi, and D. muelleri of northeastern Australia.

The species was first described as Trichilia alliacea by Georg Forster in 1786. It was reclassified as Didymocheton alliaceus in 2021.
