= Didymocheton mollis =

Scientific classification
- Kingdom: Plantae
- Clade: Tracheophytes
- Clade: Angiosperms
- Clade: Eudicots
- Clade: Rosids
- Order: Sapindales
- Family: Meliaceae
- Genus: Didymocheton
- Species: D. mollis

Binomial name
- Didymocheton mollis (Miq.) Holzmeyer & Hauenschild (2021)

Synonyms
- Dysoxylum molle Miq. (1868); Dysoxylum mollissimum subsp. molle (Miq.) Mabb. (1994); Alliaria zippeliana Kuntze (1891); Dysoxylum velutinum Koord. (1898); Epicharis mollis Wall. ex Voigt (1845), not validly publ.

Species of plant in the mahogany family

Didymocheton mollis is a species of flowering plant in the family Meliaceae. It is a tree native to Sulawesi, the Maluku Islands, New Guinea, and the Bismarck Archipelago.

It is most closely related to Didymocheton mollissimus of Malesia and mainland Southeast Asia, D. alliaceus of the Solomon Islands and western Pacific Islands, and D. muelleri of northeastern Australia.

== Taxonomy ==
The species was first described as Dysoxylum molle by Friedrich Anton Wilhelm Miquel in 1868, from a holotype collected in southwestern New Guinea. In 1994 David Mabberley reclassified it as Dysoxylum mollissimum subsp. molle, which included the populations in Sulawesi, Maluku, New Guinea, and the Bismarck Archipelago, along with Australian populations previously classified as Dysoxylum muelleri. A 2021 study by Holzmeyer, Hauenschild, Mabberley, et al. concluded that Dysoxylum was polyphyletic, and that the Australian population constituted a distinct species from the northern population. The species was placed in the revived genus Didymocheton, with the Sulawesi-to-Bismarck Archipelago population renamed Didymocheton mollis, and the Australian population under the new combination Didymocheton muelleri. The Australian population is still widely known as Dysoxylum mollissimum subsp. molle.
