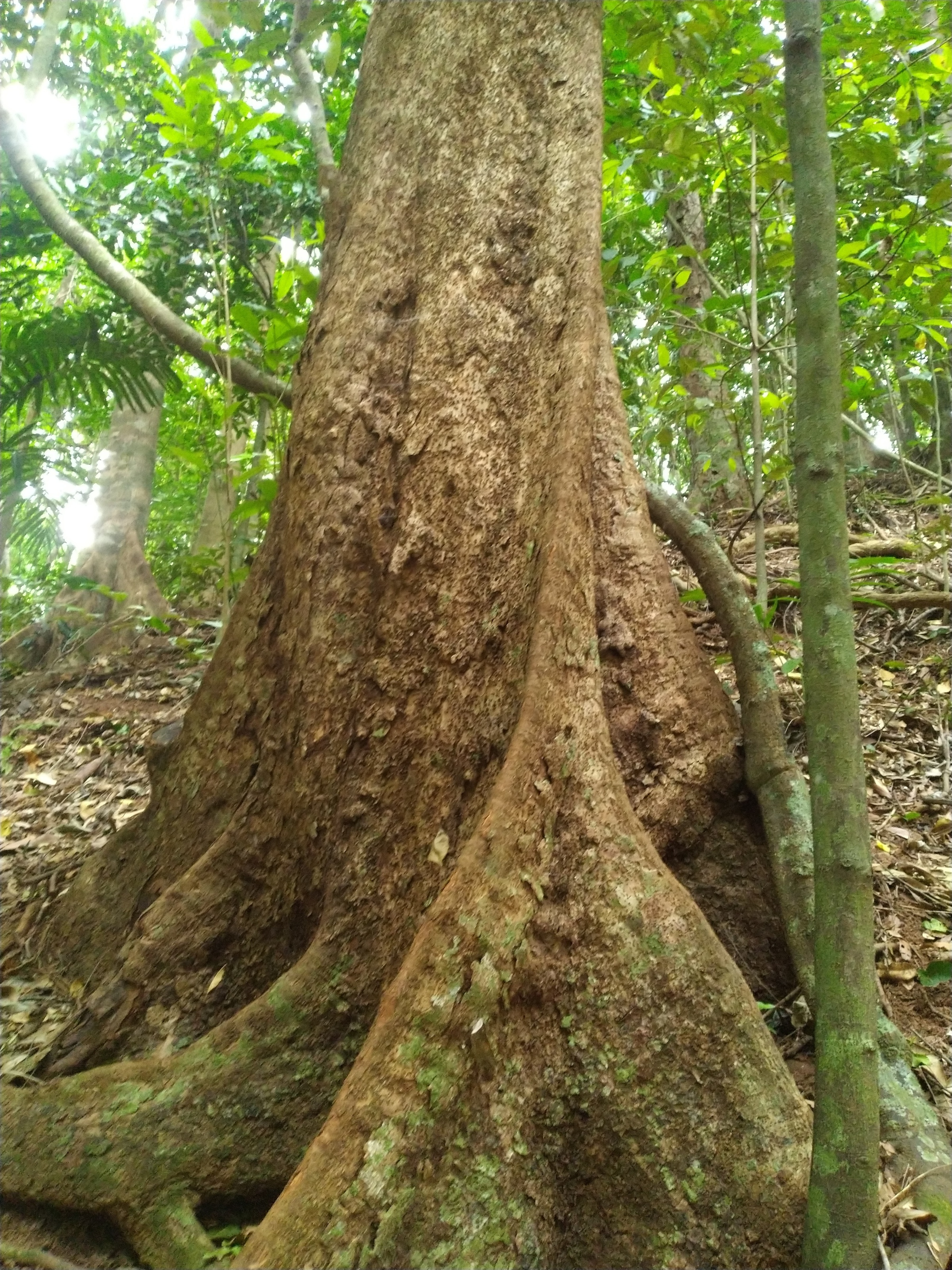
- On the Lamb Range west of Cairns

Conservation status
- Least Concern (NCA)

Scientific classification
- Kingdom: Plantae
- Clade: Tracheophytes
- Clade: Angiosperms
- Clade: Eudicots
- Clade: Rosids
- Order: Sapindales
- Family: Meliaceae
- Genus: Didymocheton
- Species: D. pettigrewianus

Binomial name
- Didymocheton pettigrewianus (F.M.Bailey) Hauenschild & Holzmeyer

Synonyms
- Dysoxylum pettigrewianum F.M.Bailey

= Didymocheton pettigrewianus =

Spur mahogany

Species of tree in the mahogany family

Didymocheton pettigrewianus, commonly known as spur mahogany, spurwood, or Cairns satinwood, is a large tree in the family Meliaceae. It is native to the rainforests of Malesia, Papuasia and Queensland. In Queensland it occurs only in a small part of the northeast coast.

== Description ==
The spur mahogany may reach in excess of 35 m (115 ft) tall, with a trunk to 1.2 m (4 ft) wide. It is known for its tall, branched and wandering buttress roots, which can reach up to 2.5 m (8 ft) in height and extend up to 2 m (7 ft) from the trunk. The rough flaky bark is brown with numerous lenticels.

The large whorled leaves are imparipinnate with between 7 and 15 leaflets. They can reach up to 80 cm (31 in) long with a petiole up to 10 cm (4 in). The petiole is sharply but very shortly winged and is swollen at its junction with the branch. The leaflets vary in size, the proximal ones are relatively small and the distal ones larger. The terminal leaflet is the largest, measuring up to 20 by 6 cm (8 by 2 in).

The inflorescences are racemes or spikes to about 19 cm (7.5 in) long, produced on the twigs (or rarely in the leaf axils). Appearing in December and January, they carry numerous small fragrant flowers which are sessile and creamy white in colour. The flowers have four linear to spathulate petals to 9 mm (0.35 in) long and a distinctive staminal tube (i.e. a tube made up of fused stamens) which is slightly flared at the tip.

The fruit are a more or less pyriform (i.e. pear-shaped) capsule up to 45 mm (1.8 in) wide by 40 mm (1.6 in) long. They are dark brown on the outside with a warty appearance. At maturity they split to reveal the orange coloured interior with up to four seeds.

== Taxonomy ==
The species was first described as Dysoxylum pettigrewianum by the colonial botanist of Queensland Frederick Manson Bailey. His description was based on specimens collected from "Scrubs at the base of Bellenden-Ker Range and the Barron River", and was published in Botany Bulletin. Department of Agriculture, Queensland 5: 9 in July 1892. In 2021 a review of the genus Dysoxylum was published, finding that the group was polyphyletic (i.e. the most recent ancestor of the members was not the same for all members. As a result large scale changes were made to the genus, and this species was given the new combination Didymocheton pettigrewianus.

=== Etymology ===
The species epithet was chosen by Bailey to honour the Brisbane businessman and politician William Pettigrew. Bailey wrote: "After the Hon. William Pettigrew, who has always taken a deep interest in Queensland timbers."

== Distribution and habitat ==
In Australia Didymocheton pettigrewianus grows in well developed rainforest from just north of Hope Vale to the Paluma Range, just north of Townsville. It is also found in the Maluku Islands, New Guinea, and the Solomon Islands.

It is found at altitudes from near sea level up to 1,000 m (3,300 ft), reaching its best development in the lowlands on basalt soils.

== Ecology ==
The fruit are eaten by cassowaries (Casuarius spp.) who swallow the entire fruit, and by metallic starlings (Aplonis metallica), who extract and swallow just the seeds. The leaves are eaten by Lumholtz's tree-kangaroo (Dendrolagus lumholtzi).

The northern leaf-tailed gecko (Saltuarius cornutus) often hunts for prey in the scaly bark where it is well camouflaged.

== Conservation ==
This species is listed by Queensland's Department of Environment, Science and Innovation as least concern. As of 2 December 2022, it has not been assessed by the IUCN.

== Uses ==
The timber of Didymocheton pettigrewianus is classified as a hardwood, with a specific gravity of 865 kg/m^{3} (1,458.0 lb/cu yd). It is red/brown in colour and is used as a general purpose and cabinet timber. It was once popular for boat building.

Growing too large for the average garden, it is suitable for planting in parks and public gardens, making a useful shade tree. Young plants need shelter, and the species does best in a well-drained acidic soil.

== Gallery ==
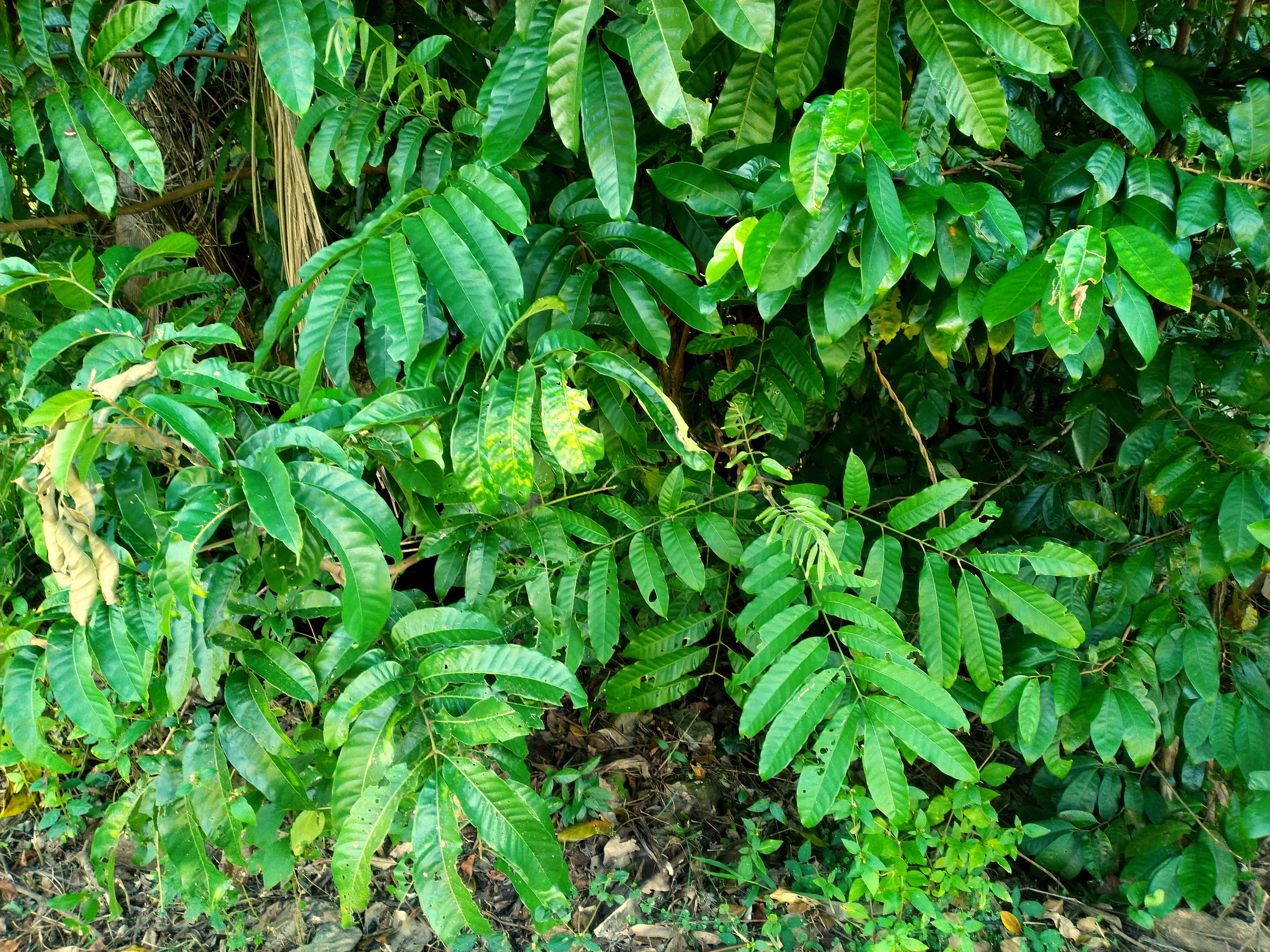
Foliage

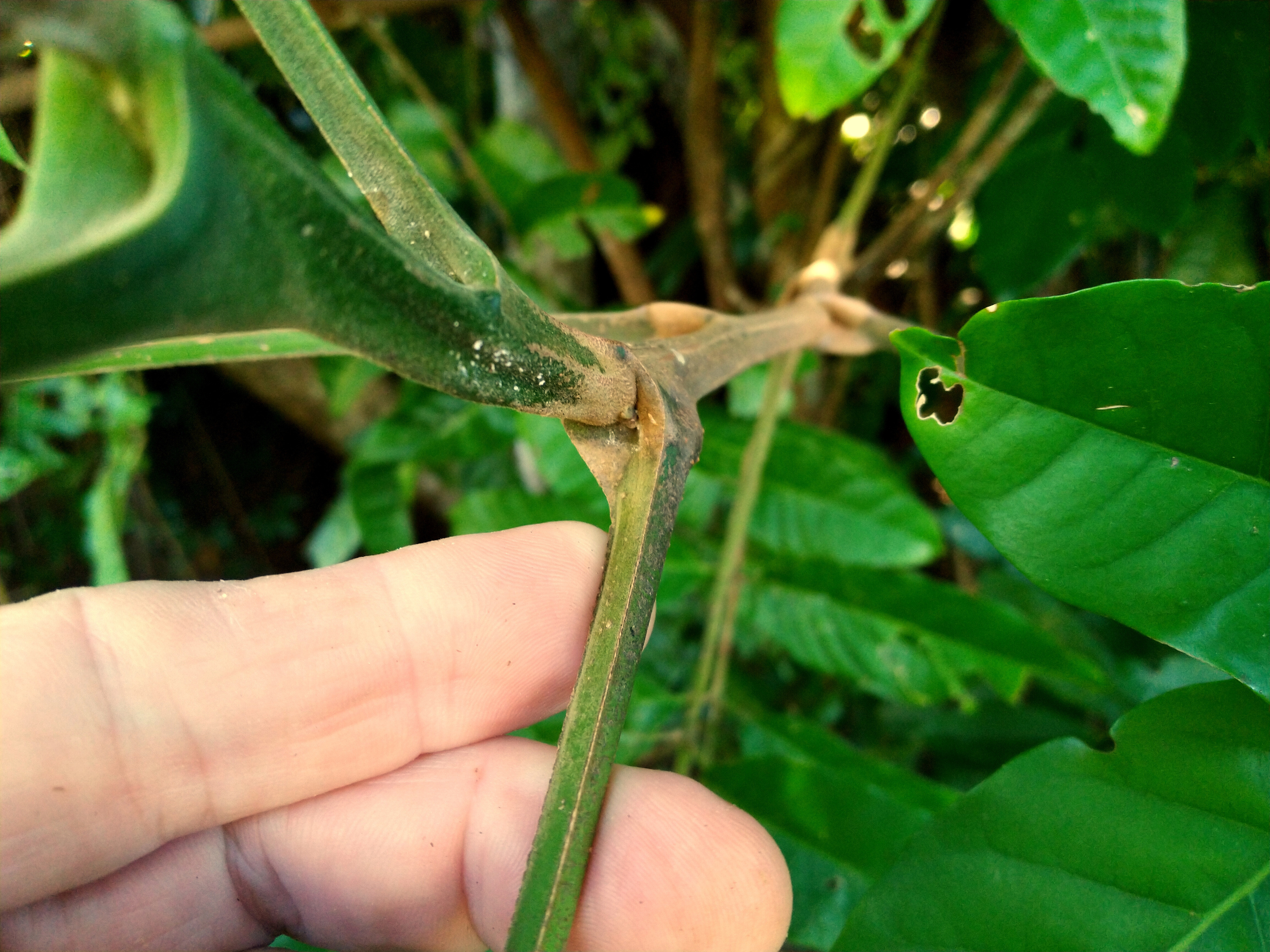
Base of the petiole

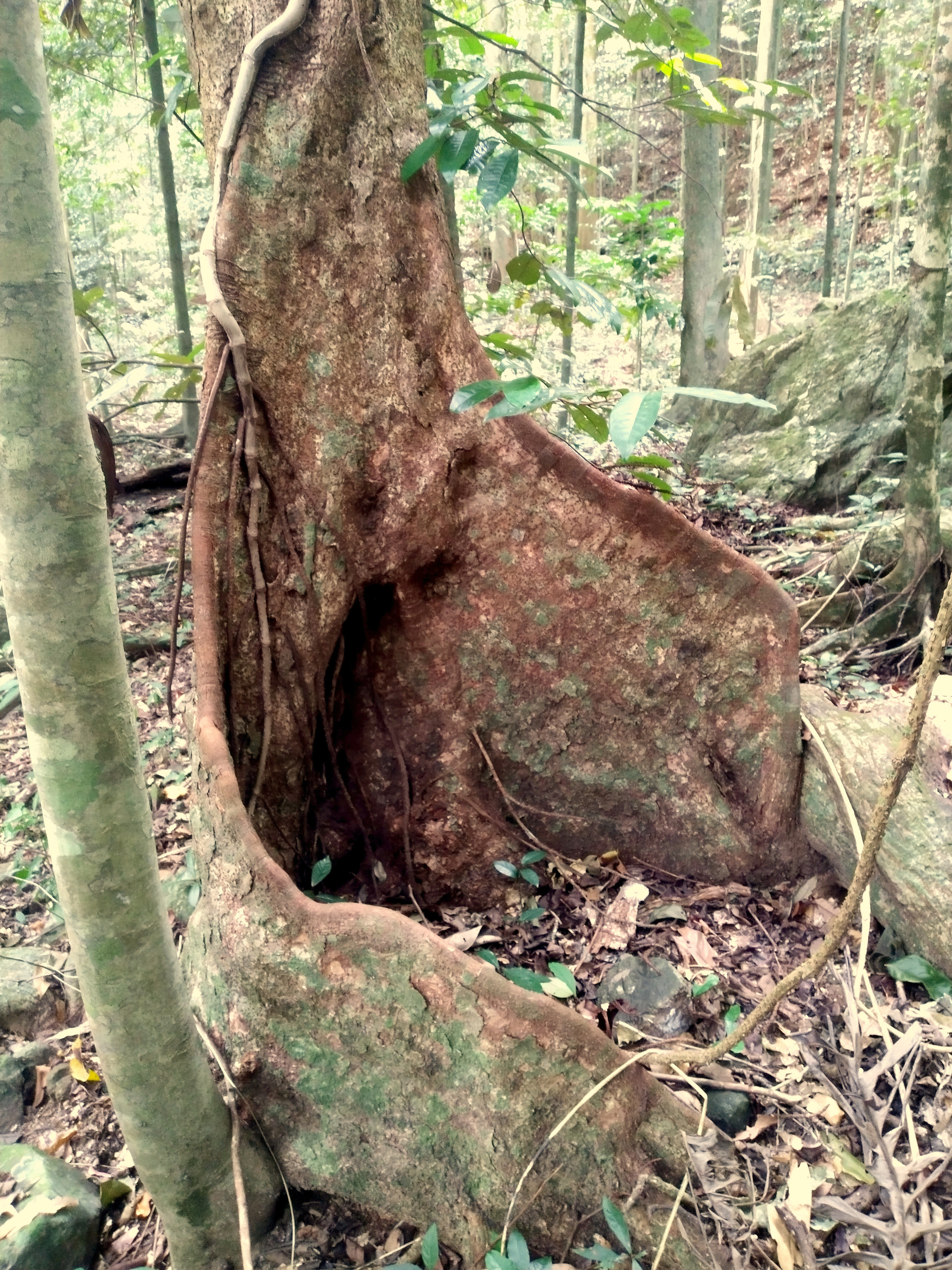
Buttress roots and rough bark

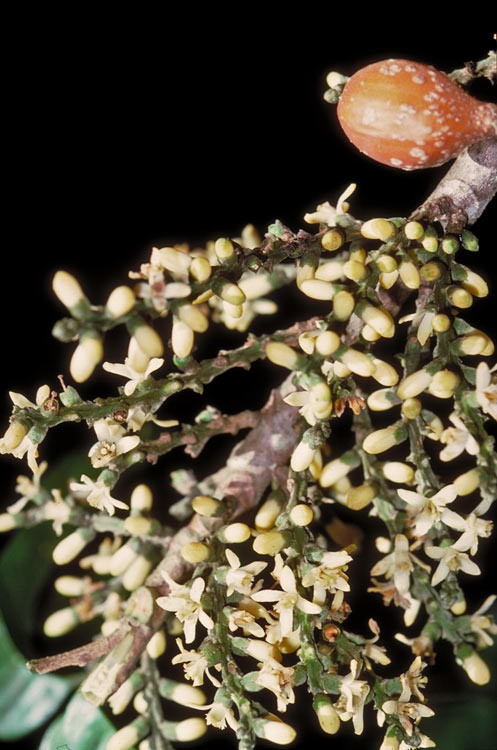
Flower buds and flowers

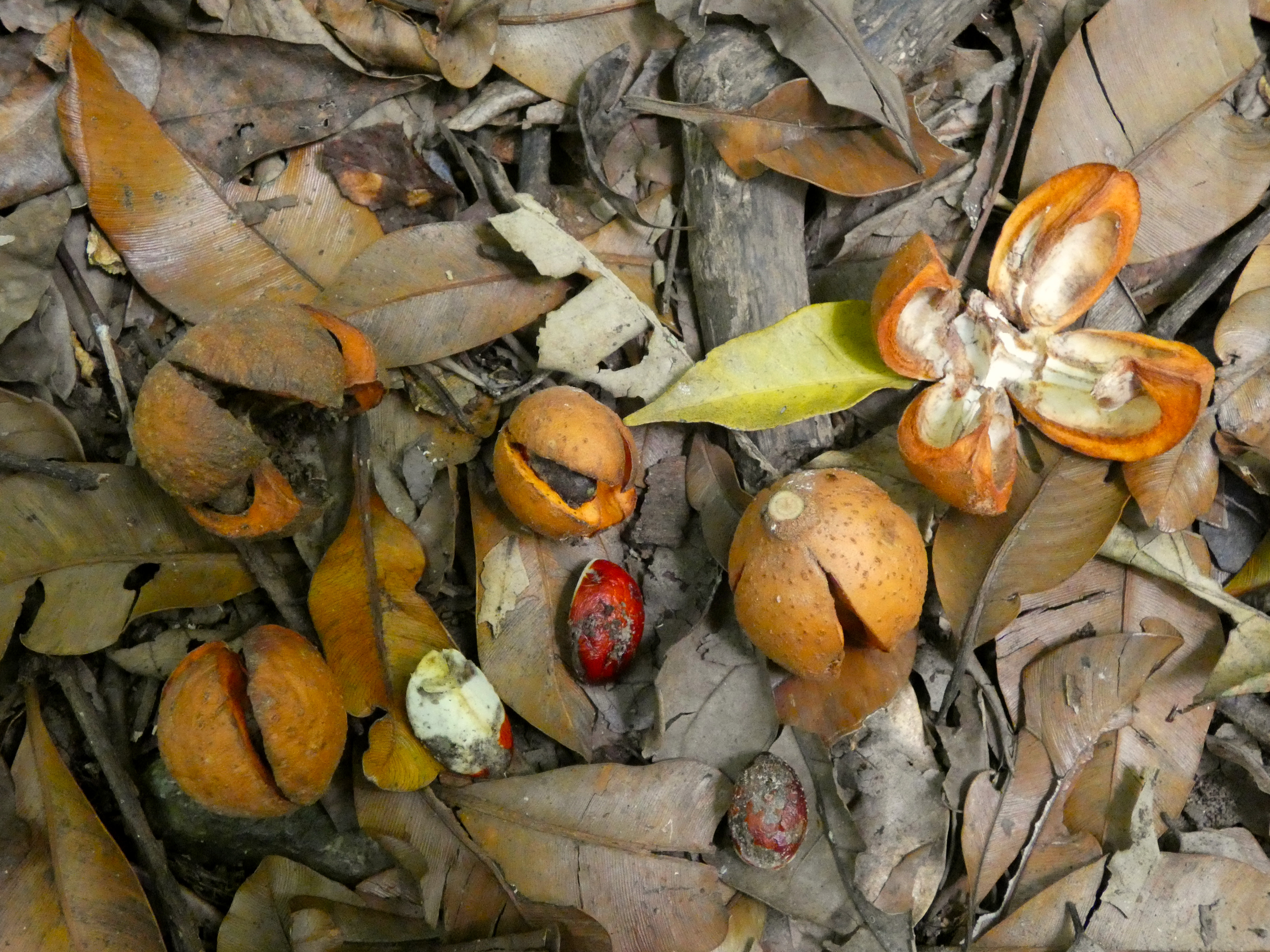
Fruit and seeds
