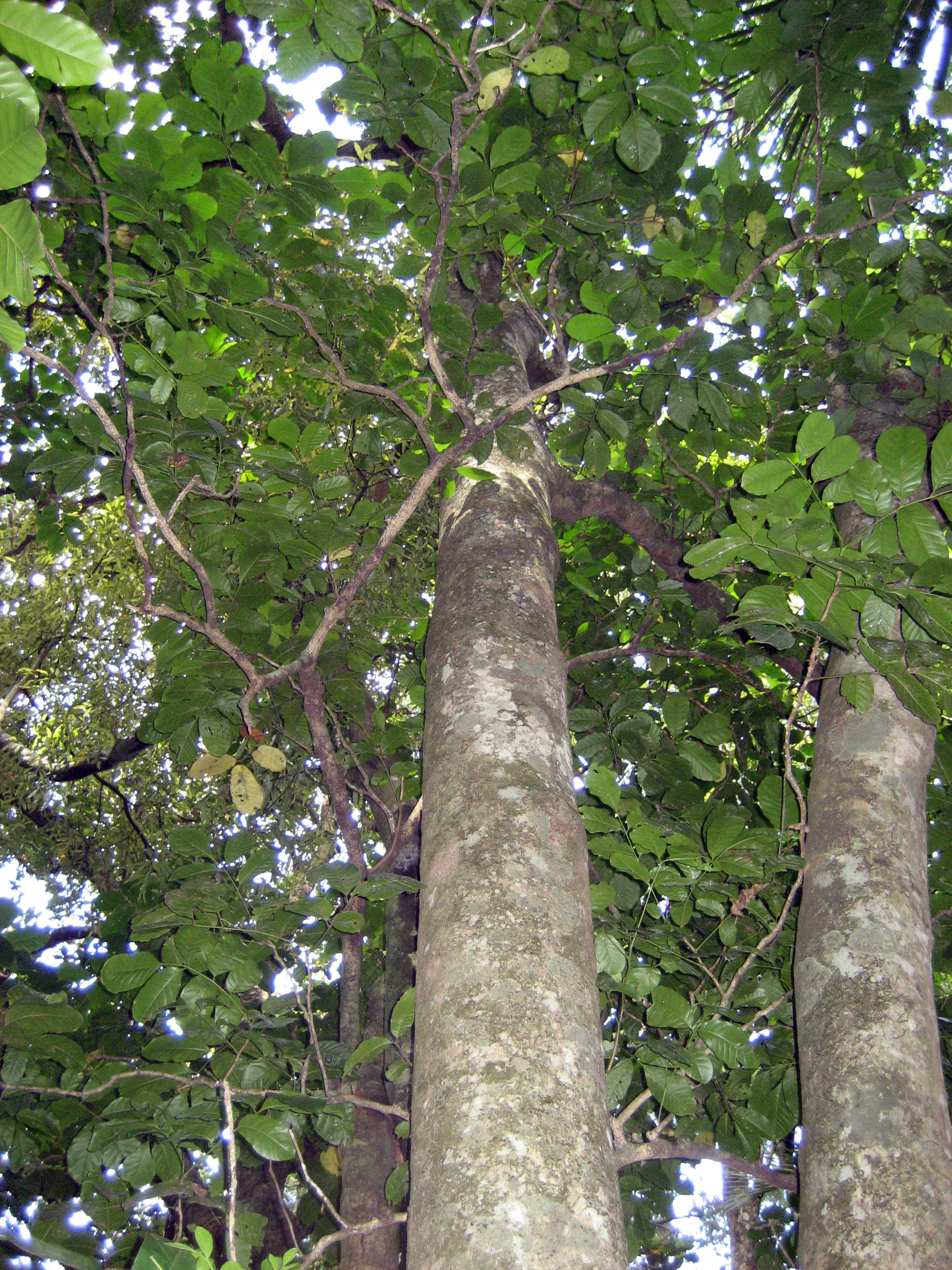
- Kohekohe (Didymocheton spectabilis)

Scientific classification
- Kingdom: Plantae
- Clade: Tracheophytes
- Clade: Angiosperms
- Clade: Eudicots
- Clade: Rosids
- Order: Sapindales
- Family: Meliaceae
- Genus: Didymocheton
- Species: D. spectabilis

Binomial name
- Didymocheton spectabilis (G.Forst.) Mabb. & Holzmeyer (2021)

Synonyms
- Alliaria spectabilis Kuntze (1891); Dysoxylum spectabile (G.Forst.) Hook.f. (1864); Hartighsea spectabilis A.Juss. (1830 publ. 1831); Trichilia cauliflora Sol. ex A.Cunn. (1839); Trichilia spectabilis G.Forst. (1786)

= Kohekohe =

Species of tree endemic to New Zealand

Kohekohe (Didymocheton spectabilis) is a medium-sized tree in the Meliaceae family, native to New Zealand. It is found in lowland and coastal forests throughout most of the North Island and also occurs in the Marlborough Sounds in the north of the South Island. Mature trees grow up to 15 metres (50 ft) in height, with a trunk up to a metre in diameter.

== Name ==
The name kohekohe is derived from Proto-Polynesian *kofe meaning a type of bamboo (ʻohe); its thickening leaf stem bases may have reminded early Polynesian settlers to those of the ʻohe. A fairly close relative of true mahogany (Swietenia), it is also called New Zealand mahogany, because its wood is light, strong and polishes to a fine red colour.

== Description ==
Kohekohe is notable for having characteristics normally associated with trees growing in the tropics, for example, its flowers and fruit grow directly from the trunk or branches (known as cauliflory), and it has large, glossy, pinnate leaves up to 40 cm (16 in) in length. The inflorescences of kohekohe may be up to 30 cm (12 in) long, and the flowers produce a strong sweet smell. The large green fruit takes around fifteen months to ripen. The fruit contains three or four cells containing a seed encased in a fleshy orange-coloured aril. The tree does not flower in the year while the fruit capsules are maturing, and therefore individual trees may flower in alternate years.

== Habitat/Distribution ==
Kohekohe forest used to be common in damp coastal and lowland areas in the North Island, but these forests have mostly disappeared because the land was used for settlement or they were browsed by possums. Studies have shown rapid recovery in kohekohe canopy after implementation of possum control. Kohekohe was probably the dominant vegetation cover on Kapiti Island before it was cleared in the early 19th century for cultivation and farming. The kohekohe forest on Kapiti is recovering after possums were eradicated in 1986.

== Uses ==
Māori boiled the bark in water and drank it as a tonic. The wood was used for building waka but it is soft and not as durable as other woods and tends to rot quickly. It is valued for carving and, since older trees are often hollow, for making waka.

== Gallery ==
Kohekohe

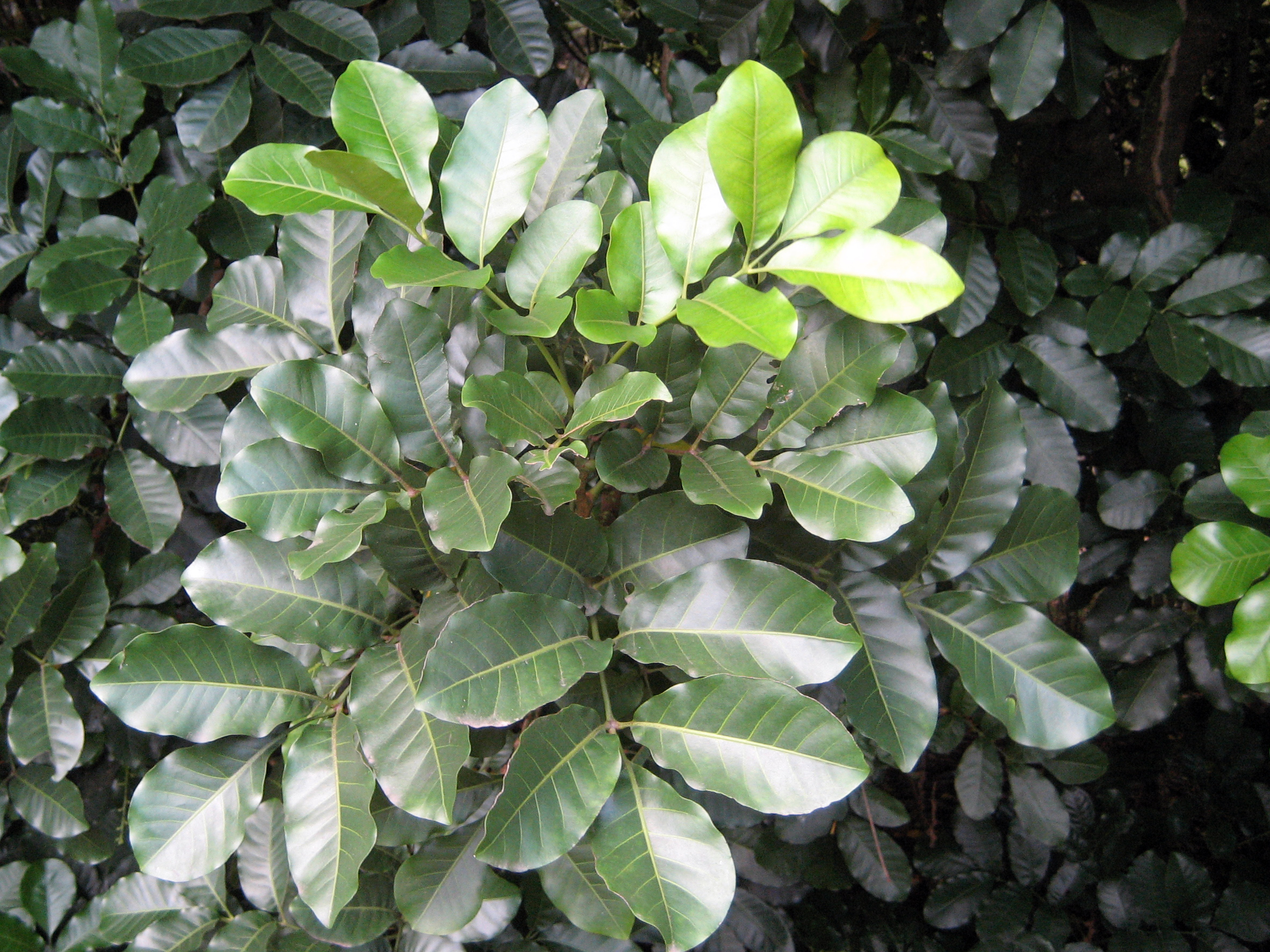
Foliage

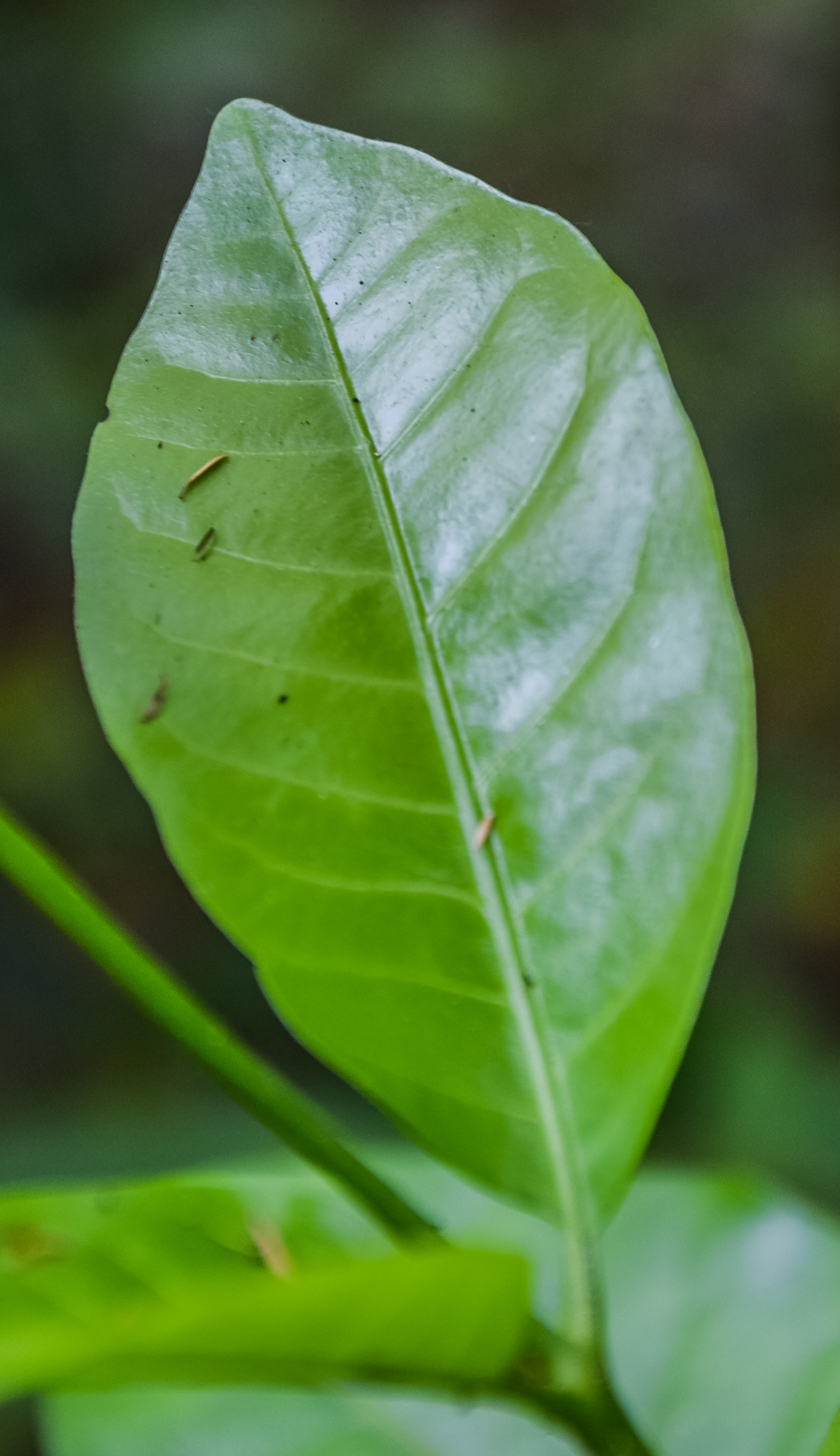
Leaf

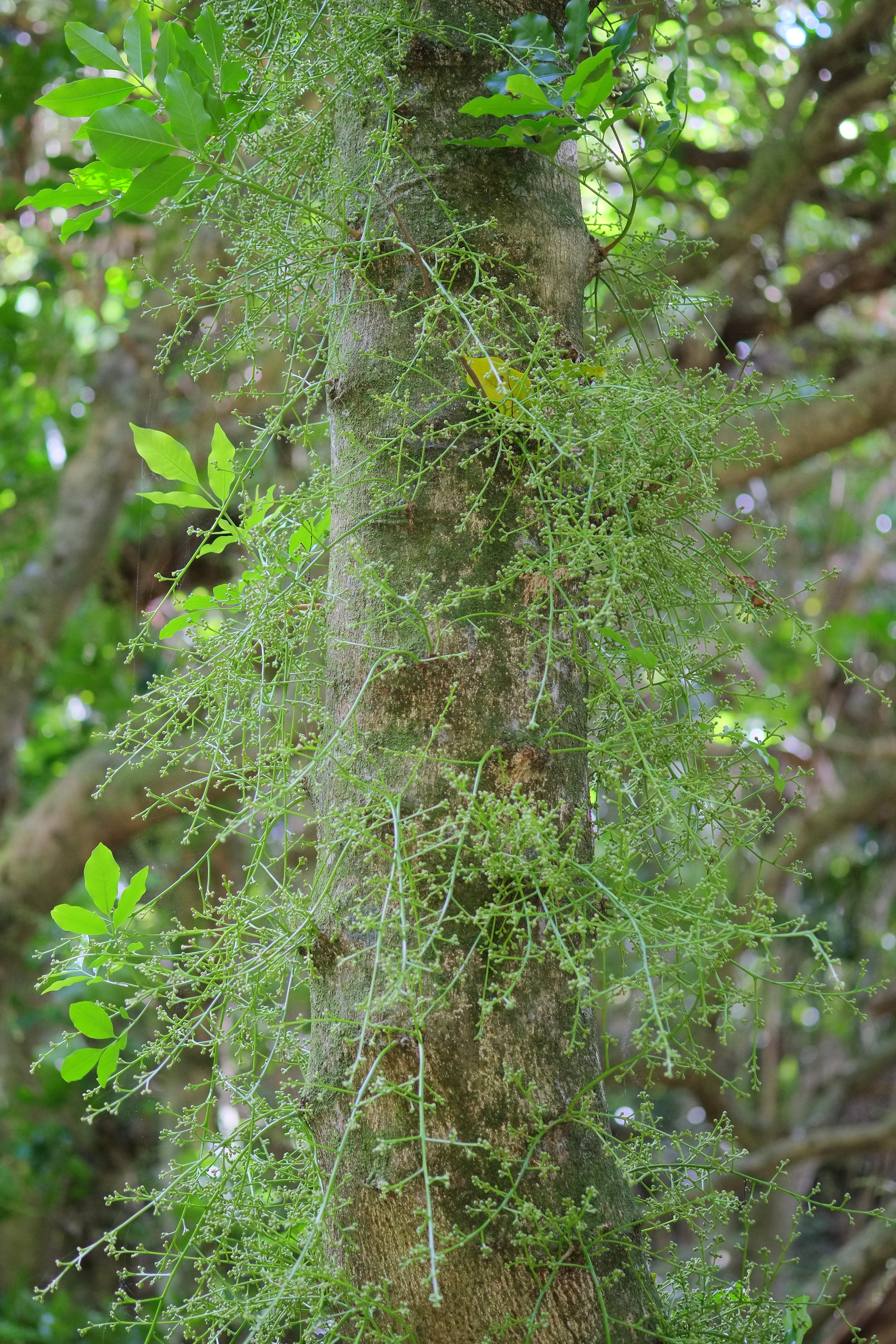
Panicles growing directly from trunk

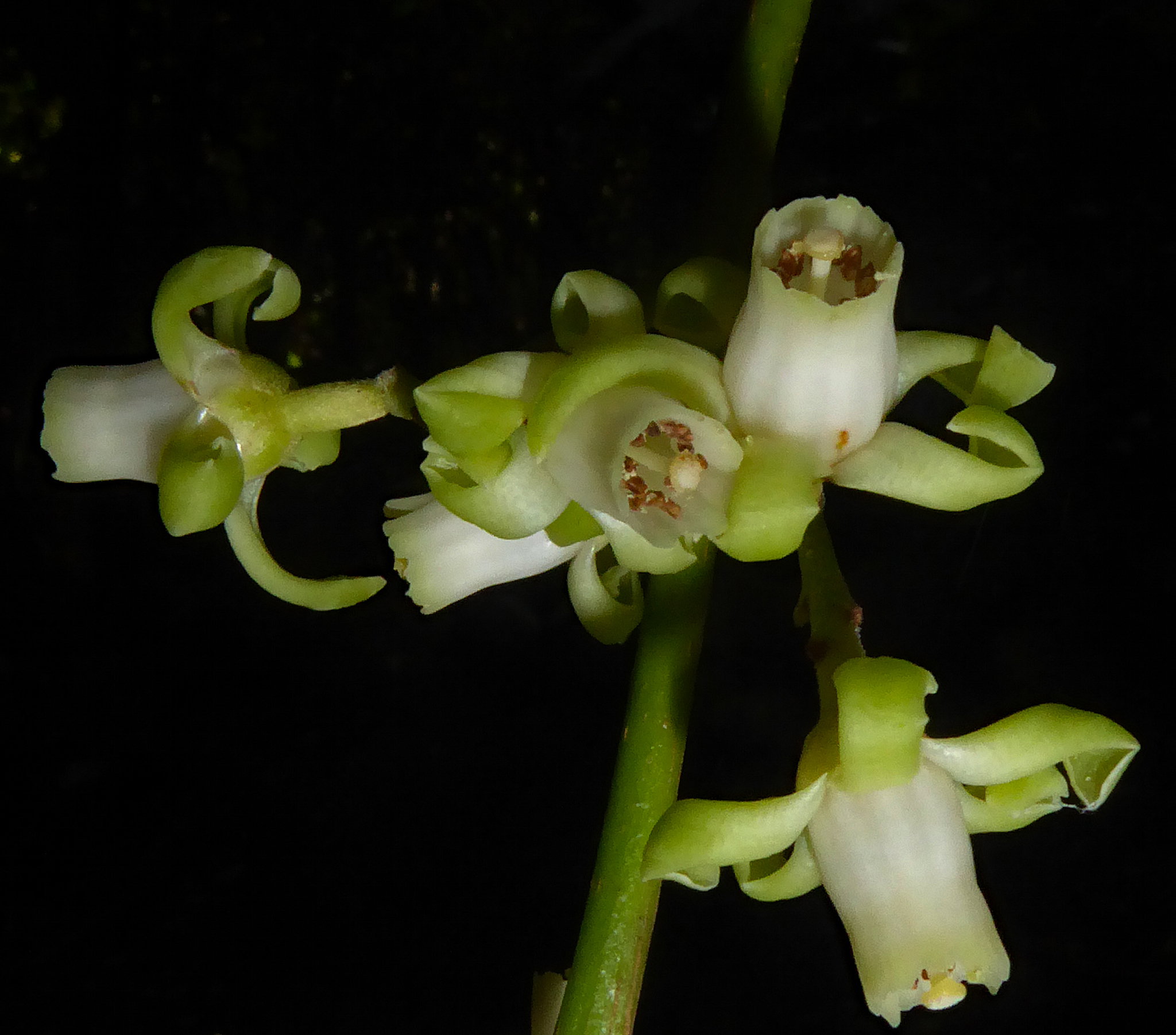
Close-up of flowers

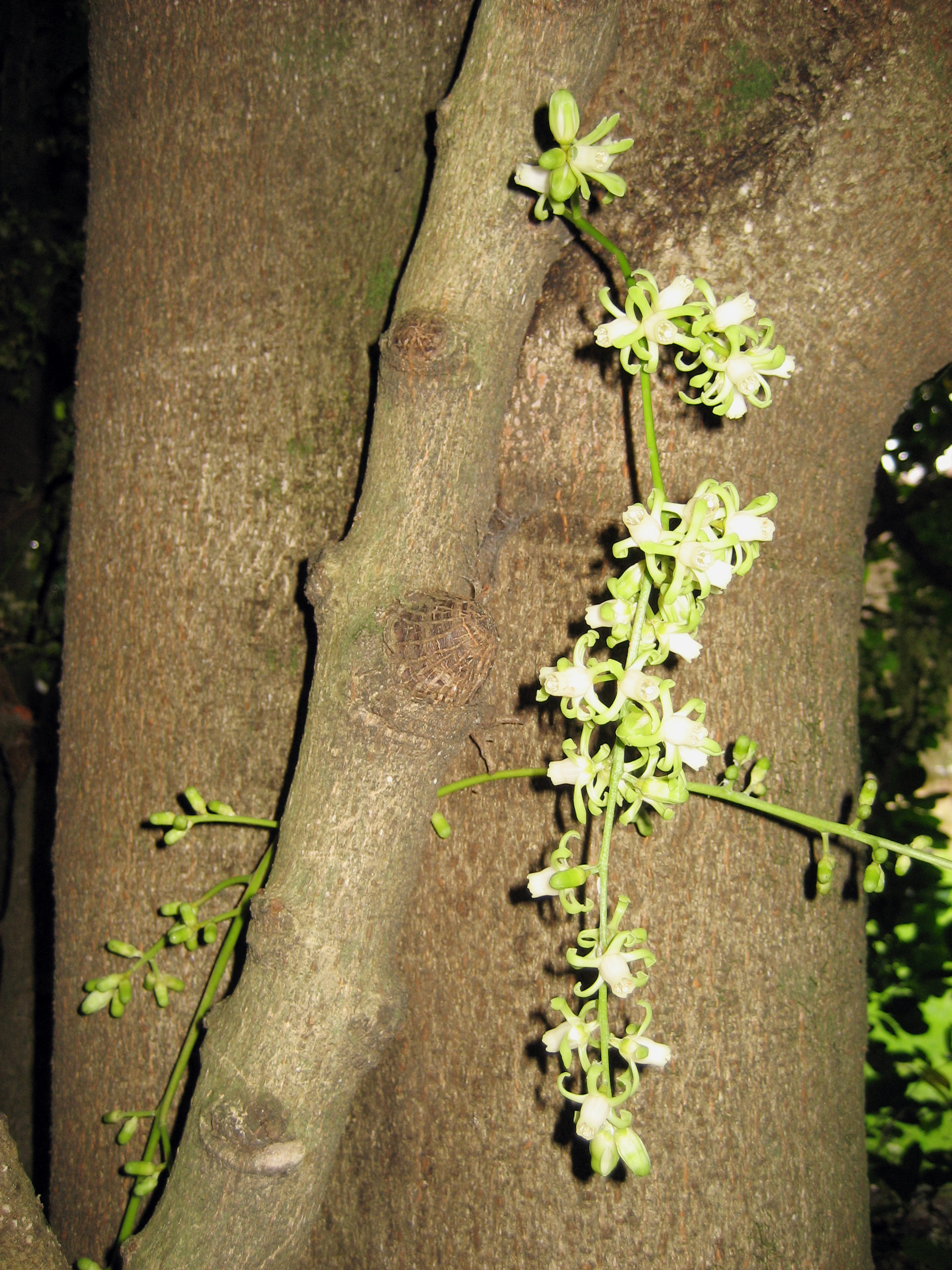
Flowers

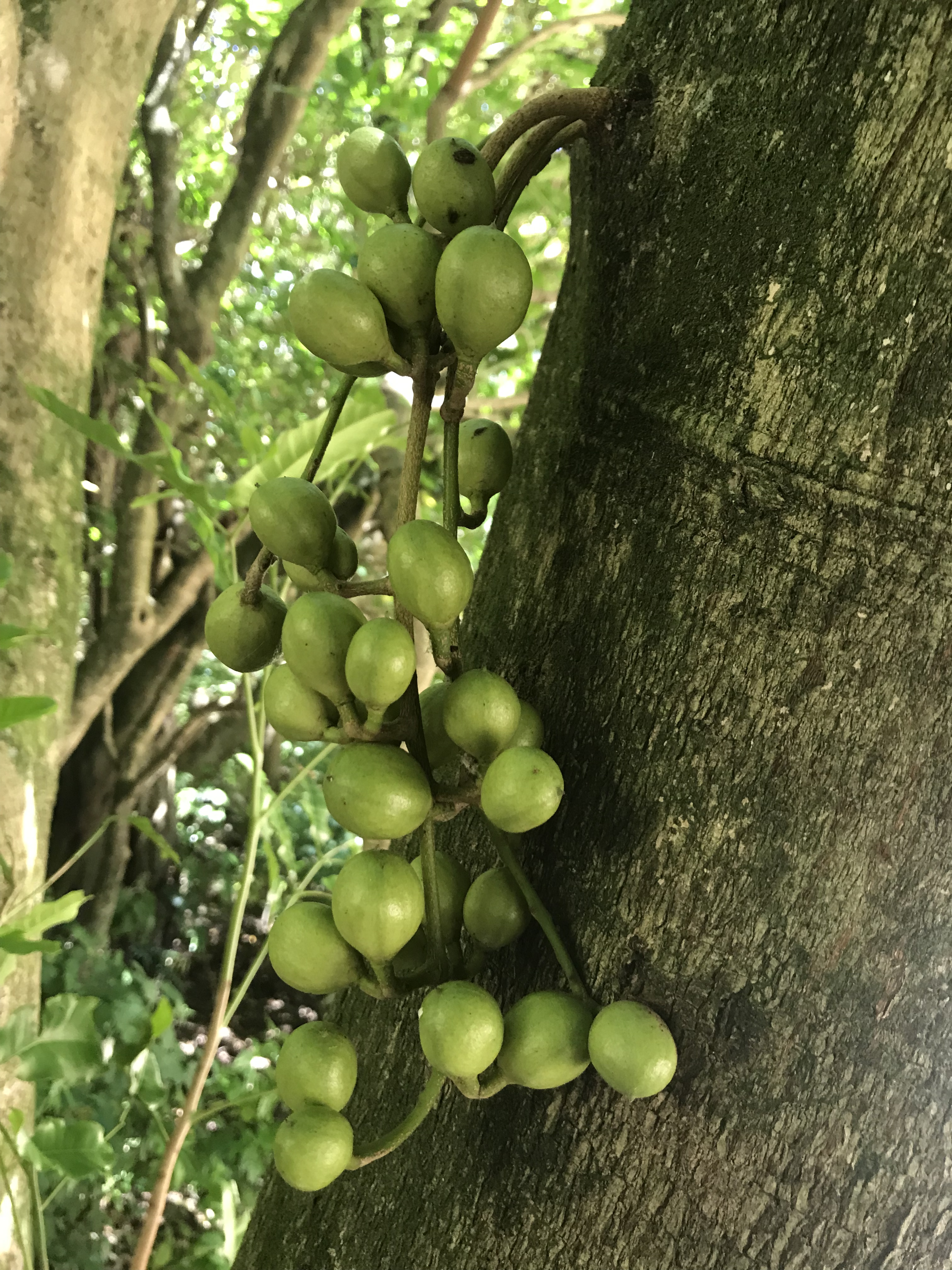
Fruits

== Taxonomy ==
Kohekohe was first described by Georg Forster in 1786 as Trichilia spectabilis, and was transferred to the genus, Dysoxylum, in 1864 by Joseph Hooker. A study published in 2021 found that Dysoxylum was paraphyletic, and the species was reclassified into the revived genus Didymocheton.
