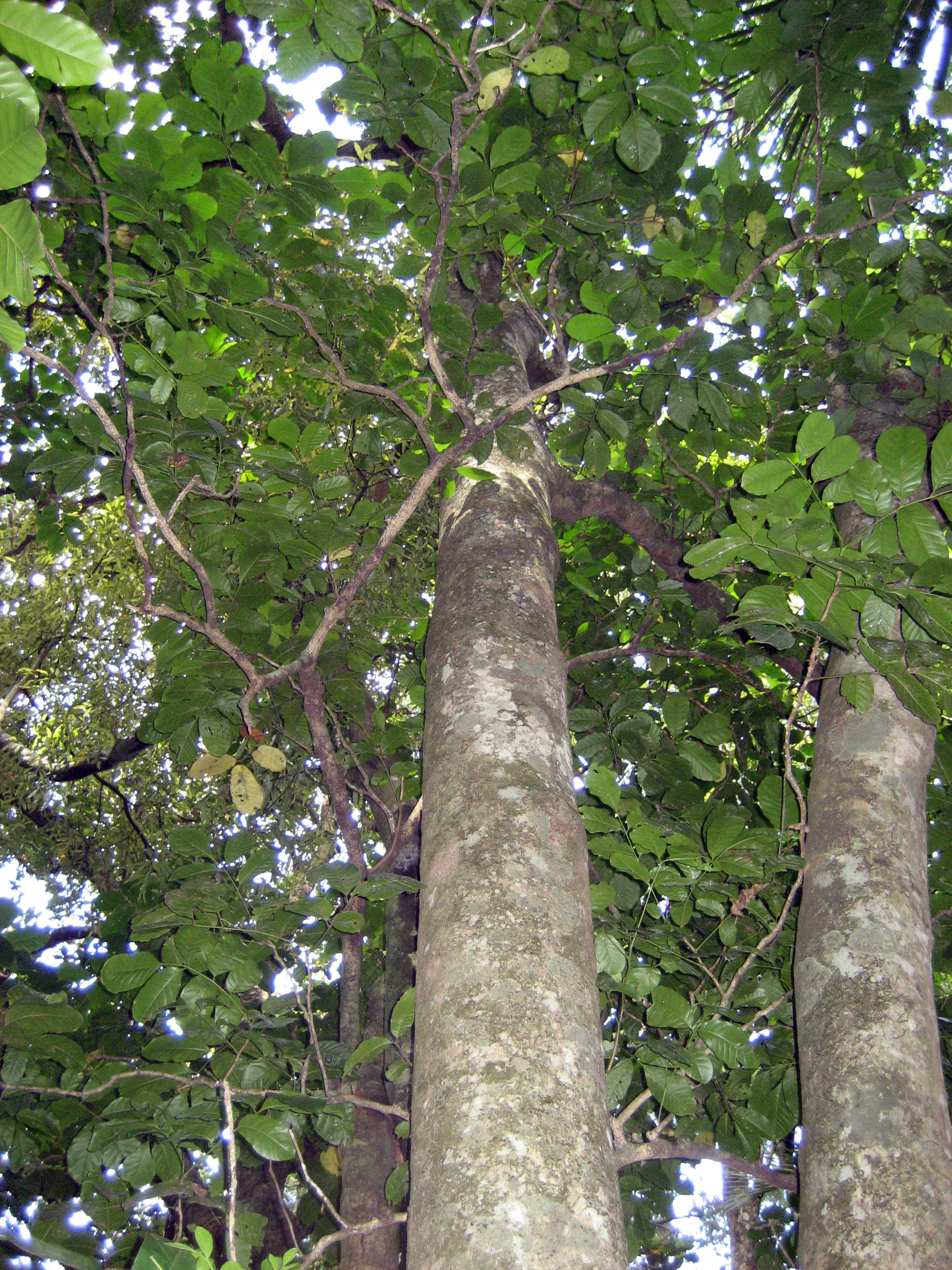
- Kohekohe (Didymocheton spectabilis)

Scientific classification
- Kingdom: Plantae
- Clade: Tracheophytes
- Clade: Angiosperms
- Clade: Eudicots
- Clade: Rosids
- Order: Sapindales
- Family: Meliaceae
- Subfamily: Melioideae
- Genus: Didymocheton; Blume (1825)

Type species
- Didymocheton nutans Blume

Species
- 41; see text

Synonyms
- Cambania Comm. ex M.Roem. (1846); Hartighsea A.Juss. (1830); Macrochiton M.Roem. (1846); Meliadelpha Radlk. (1890)

= Didymocheton =

Genus of flowering plants

Didymocheton is a genus of flowering plants in the family Meliaceae. It includes 41 species which range from eastern India through Indochina and southern China to Malesia, Papuasia, eastern Australia, New Zealand, and the South Pacific.

The genus was first named by Carl Ludwig Blume in 1825. Most of the species currently accepted were, until recently, included in genus Dysoxylum. A genetic study published in 2021 found that Dysoxylum is polyphyletic, and Didymocheton was revived and re-circumscribed.

== Species ==
41 species are accepted.

- Didymocheton aliquantulus (A.C.Sm.) Holzmeyer & Hauenschild – Fiji (northwestern Viti Levu)
- Didymocheton alliaceus (G.Forst.) Mabb. – Caroline Islands, Fiji, Niue, Samoan Islands, Solomon Islands, Tonga, Vanuatu, and Wallis and Futuna
- Didymocheton aneityensis (Guillaumin) Harms – southern Vanuatu
- Didymocheton annae (Mabb.) Mabb. – northwestern New Guinea
- Didymocheton bijugus (Labill.) Holzmeyer & Mabb. – Vanuatu, New Caledonia, Norfolk Islands (including Phillip Island)
- Didymocheton boridianus (Mabb.) Mabb. – eastern New Guinea
- Didymocheton canalensis (Baill.) Holzmeyer & Mabb. – central and southeastern New Caledonia
- Didymocheton dolichobotrys (Merr. & L.M.Perry) Harms – Solomon Islands (Santa Isabel Island)
- Didymocheton fraserianus (A.Juss.) Mabb. & Hauenschild – New South Wales and Queensland
- Didymocheton gaudichaudianus A.Juss. – Christmas Island, Java, Sulawesi, Lesser Sunda Islands, Maluku Islands, Philippines, Papuasia, Queensland, Samoan Islands, Tonga, Vanuatu, and Wallis and Futuna
- Didymocheton hornei (Gillespie) Harms – Fiji
- Didymocheton huntii (Merr. ex Setch.) Harms – Solomon Islands and Samoan Islands
- Didymocheton kouiriensis (Virot) Mabb. – northwestern and central New Caledonia
- Didymocheton lenticellaris (Gillespie) Harms – Fiji
- Didymocheton loureiroi (Pierre) Harms – Cambodia, Laos, and Vietnam
- Didymocheton macranthus (C.DC.) Harms – northwestern and Central New Caledonia
- Didymocheton macrostachyus (C.DC.) Mabb. – New Caledonia
- Didymocheton minutiflorus (Baill.) Holzmeyer & Mabb. – southeastern New Caledonia
- Didymocheton mollis (Miq.) Holzmeyer & Hauenschild – Sulawesi, Maluku Islands, New Guinea, and the Bismarck Archipelago
- Didymocheton mollissimus (Spreng.) Mabb. – eastern Himalayas and Bangladesh to Myanmar, southern China, Thailand, Peninsular Malaysia, Sumatra, Borneo, Java, Lesser Sunda Islands, and the Philippines
- Didymocheton muelleri (Benth.) Mabb. – Queensland
- Didymocheton multijugus (Seem.) Harms – Fiji
- Didymocheton myriandrus (A.C.Sm.) Holzmeyer & Hauenschild – Fiji
- Didymocheton nutans Blume – Java, Lesser Sunda Islands, Sulawesi, and Maluku Islands
- Didymocheton pachyphyllus (Hemsl.) Mabb. & Holzmeyer – Lord Howe Island
- Didymocheton pachypodus (Baill.) Harms – central New Caledonia
- Didymocheton papuanus (Merr. & L.M.Perry) Mabb. – New Guinea, Solomon Islands, and northern and northeastern Queensland
- Didymocheton pauciflorus (Merr.) Mabb. – Philippines
- Didymocheton pettigrewianus (F.M.Bailey) Hauenschild & Holzmeyer – Maluku Islands, Papuasia, and Queensland
- Didymocheton phaeotrichus (Harms) Mabb. – central New Guinea
- Didymocheton roseus (Baill.) Holzmeyer & Mabb. – northern and central New Caledonia
- Didymocheton rufescens (Vieill. ex Pancher & Sebert) Harms – New Caledonia
- Didymocheton rufus (A.Rich.) Harms – Queensland and northeastern New South Wales
- Didymocheton sessilis (Miq.) Kosterm. – northern and Central Maluku
- Didymocheton setosus (Span.) Mabb. & Holzmeyer – Lesser Sunda Islands (Timor), New Guinea, and northern Queensland
- Didymocheton sparsiflorus (Mabb.) Mabb. – New Guinea
- Didymocheton spectabilis (G.Forst.) Mabb. & Holzmeyer – New Zealand
- Didymocheton stellatopuberulus (C.DC.) Harms – New Guinea
- Didymocheton tenuiflorus (A.C.Sm.) Holzmeyer & Hauenschild – Fiji
- Didymocheton tongensis (A.C.Sm.) Holzmeyer & Hauenschild – Tonga ('Eua)
- Didymocheton variabilis (Harms) Holzmeyer & Mabb. – Papuasia
