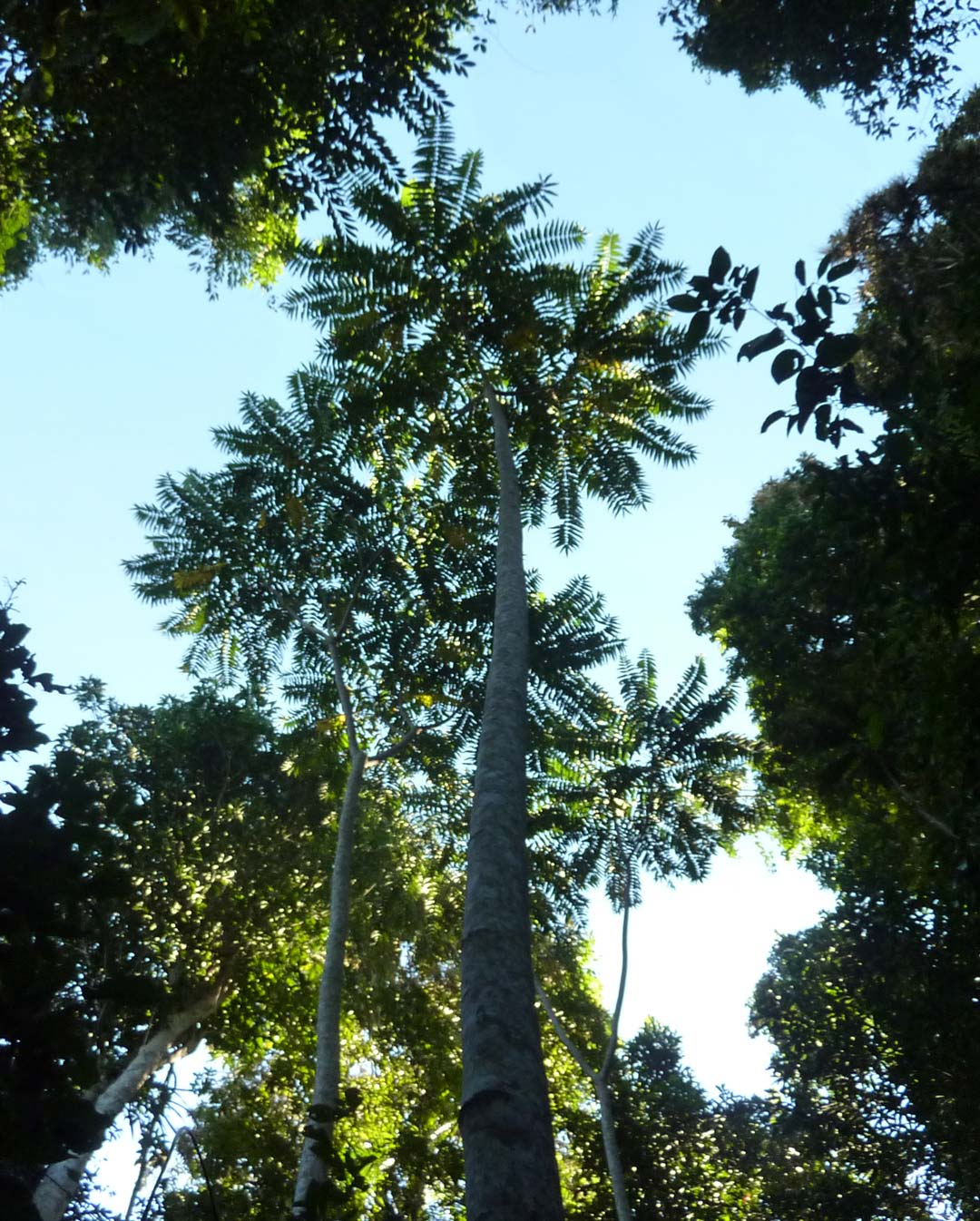
- Ivory mahogany near Lacey Creek, Queensland

Conservation status
- Least Concern (IUCN 3.1)

Scientific classification
- Kingdom: Plantae
- Clade: Embryophytes
- Clade: Tracheophytes
- Clade: Angiosperms
- Clade: Eudicots
- Clade: Rosids
- Order: Sapindales
- Family: Meliaceae
- Genus: Didymocheton
- Species: D. gaudichaudianus

Binomial name
- Didymocheton gaudichaudianus A.Juss.

Synonyms
- List: Alliaria ammooroides (Miq.) Kuntze (1891); Alliaria gaudichaudiana (A.Juss.) Kuntze (1891); Alliaria otophora (Miq.) Kuntze (1891); Alliaria spanoghei (Miq.) Kuntze (1891); Didymocheton albiflorus (C.DC.) Harms (1940); Didymocheton amooroides (Miq.) Harms (1940); Didymocheton betchei (C.DC.) Harms (1940); Didymocheton decandrus (Blanco) Harms (1940); Didymocheton maota (Reinecke) Harms (1940); Didymocheton spanoghei (Miq.) Harms (1940); Dysoxylum albiflorum C.DC. (1912); Dysoxylum amooroides Miq. (1868); Dysoxylum amooroides var. otophorum (Miq.) Koord. & Valeton (1896); Dysoxylum amooroides var. pubescens Hochr. (1904); Dysoxylum bakerarum Guillaumin (1938); Dysoxylum betchei C.DC. (1903); Dysoxylum blancoi Vidal (1880); Dysoxylum decandrum (Blanco) Merr. (1918); Dysoxylum gaudichaudianum (A.Juss.) Miq. (1868); Dysoxylum intermedium Merr. & L.M.Perry (1948); Dysoxylum macrophyllum Teijsm. & Binn. (1866), nom. nud.; Dysoxylum maota Reinecke (1898); Dysoxylum otophorum Miq. (1868); Dysoxylum pubescens Teijsm. & Binn. (1866), nom. nud.; Dysoxylum quaifei C.DC. (1906); Dysoxylum rufum var. glabrescens Benth. (1863); Dysoxylum salutare Fern.-Vill. (1880), nom. illeg.; Dysoxylum spanoghei Miq. (1868); Dysoxylum vestitum Warb. (1891); Turraea decandra Blanco (1837); Turraea virens Blanco (1845), sensu auct.

= Didymocheton gaudichaudianus =

Species of tree in the mahogany family

Didymocheton gaudichaudianus, commonly known as ivory mahogany, is a species of rainforest tree in the family Meliaceae, native to Malesia, Papuasia, Queensland, Australia, and some southwest Pacific islands.

== Description ==
The ivory mahogany is a large tree growing up to 36 m (118 ft) in height with a straight trunk up to 80 cm (31 in) diameter. The bark is smooth and often has teaspoon-sized depressions in it. Buttress roots may reach up to 2.5 m (8 ft 2 in) high and 3.5 m (11 ft) wide.

The very large leaves are produced in whorls and clustered towards the ends of the branches. They are imparipinnate with up to 14 pairs of leaflets, and measure up to 125 cm (49 in) in length. This arrangement produces large spherical clusters of foliage (see gallery).

The leaflets are highly asymmetric at the base with one side of the leaf blade wider than the other. They measure up to 30 by 8 cm (11.8 by 3.1 in)

The inflorescences are thyrses, about 70 cm (28 in) long, and produced in or close to the leaf axils. The flowers are a pale cream or green, 5-merous, with an unpleasant smell. The fruits are capsules about 3 cm (1.2 in) diameter which are covered in fine brown hairs. They have five segments and contain up to 10 seeds about 1 cm (0.39 in) long.

=== Phenology ===
Flowering in Australia occurs from September to January, with fruits ripening around October to February.

== Taxonomy ==
This species was first described by Adrien-Henri de Jussieu in 1830. It has been known by many synonyms.

The species epithet was given to honour French botanist Charles Gaudichaud-Beaupré. The former genus name Dysoxylum comes from the Latin dys meaning "bad", and the Ancient Greek xylon meaning "wood", and refers to the unpleasant smell produced by some species.

== Distribution and habitat ==
Didymocheton gaudichaudianus is native to central and eastern Malesia (Christmas Island, Java, the Lesser Sunda Islands, Sulawesi, Maluku Islands, and the Philippines), Papuasia (New Guinea, the Bismarck Archipelago, and the Solomon Islands), Queensland, Australia from the Cape York Peninsula to the Mary River in south east Queensland, and some islands South-West Pacific (Vanuatu, the Samoan Islands, Tonga, and Wallis and Futuna). It grows in lowland rainforest up to 300 metres (980 ft) elevation.

== Gallery ==
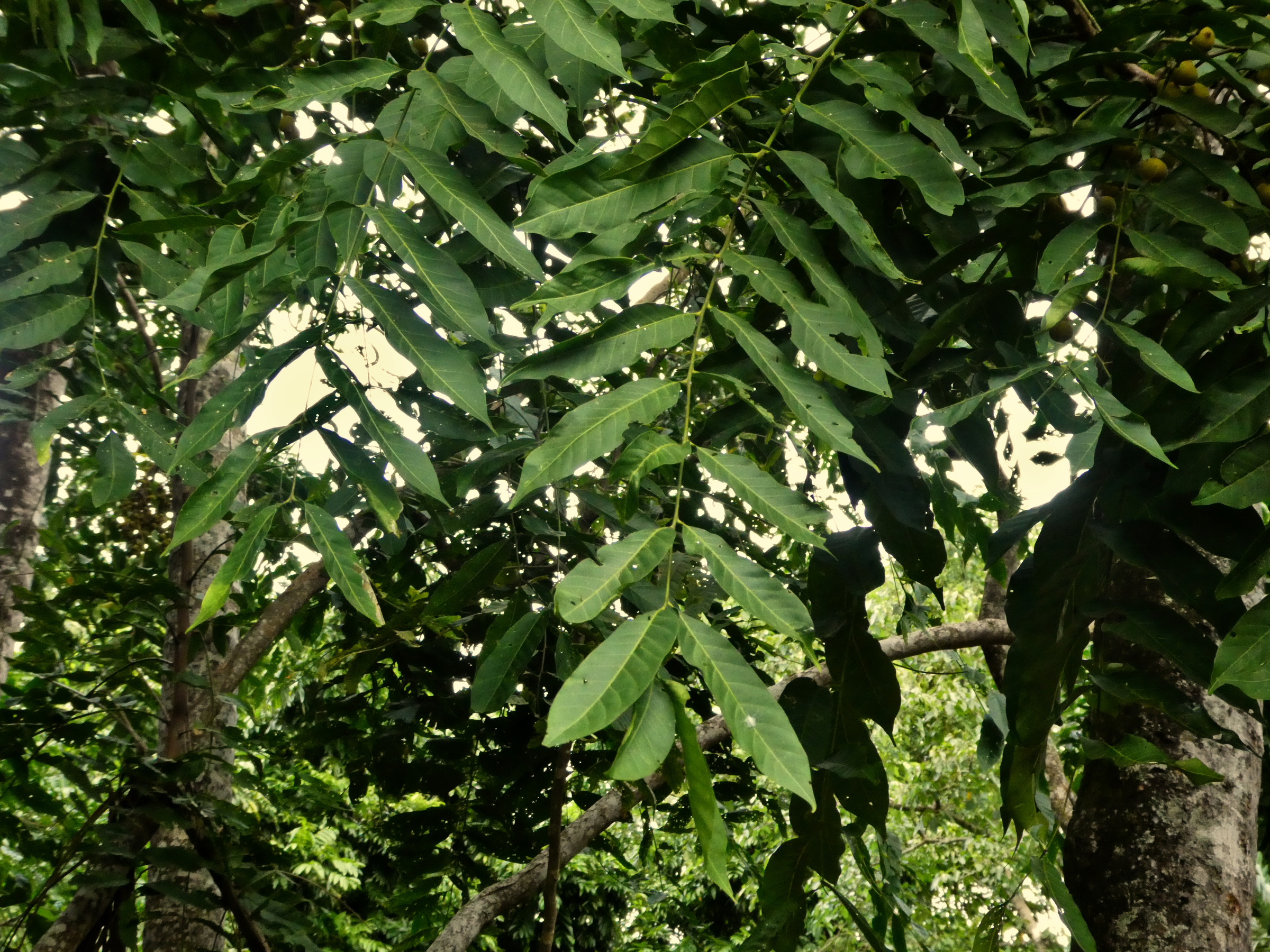
The compound leaf

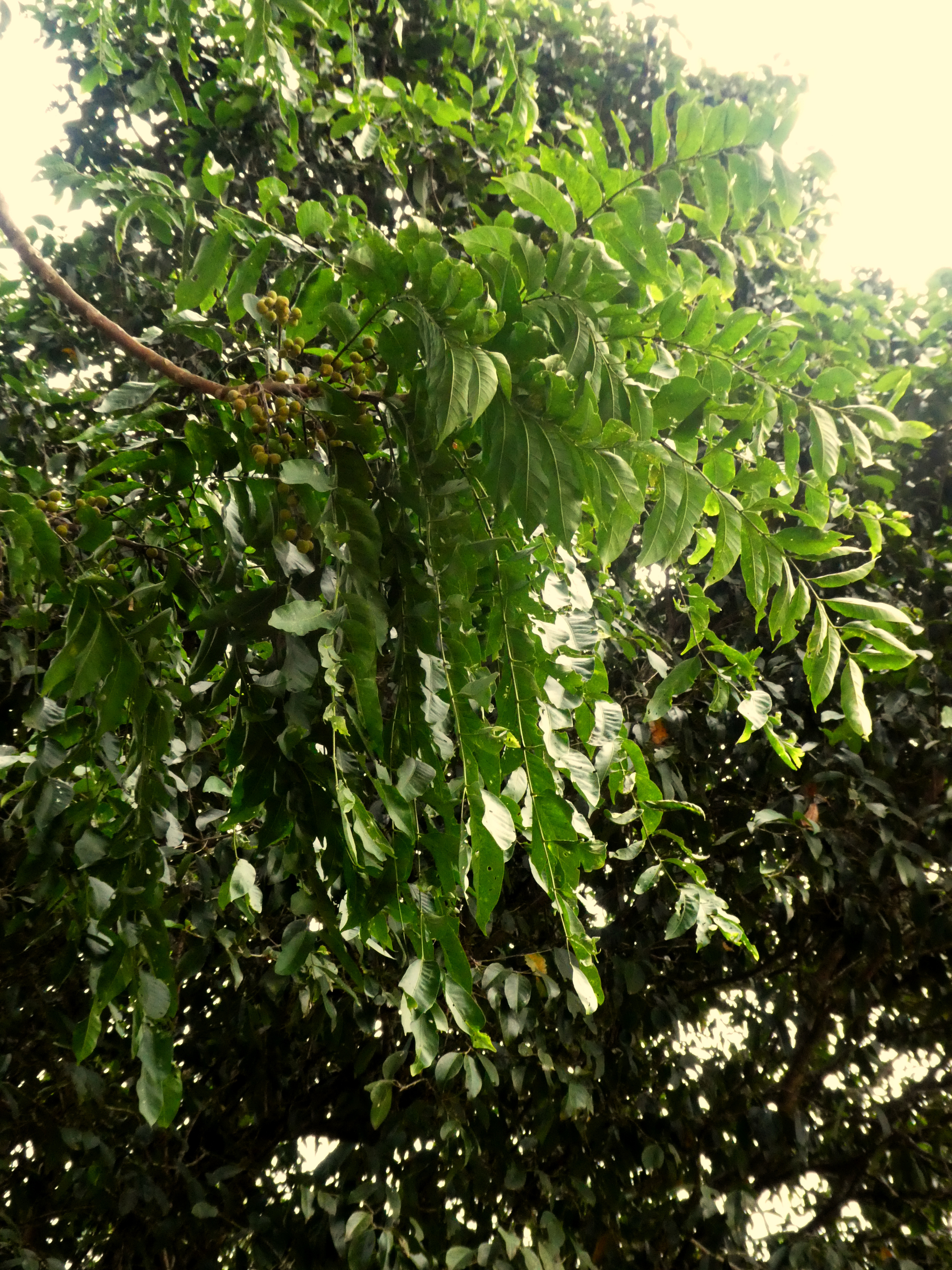
Foliage cluster

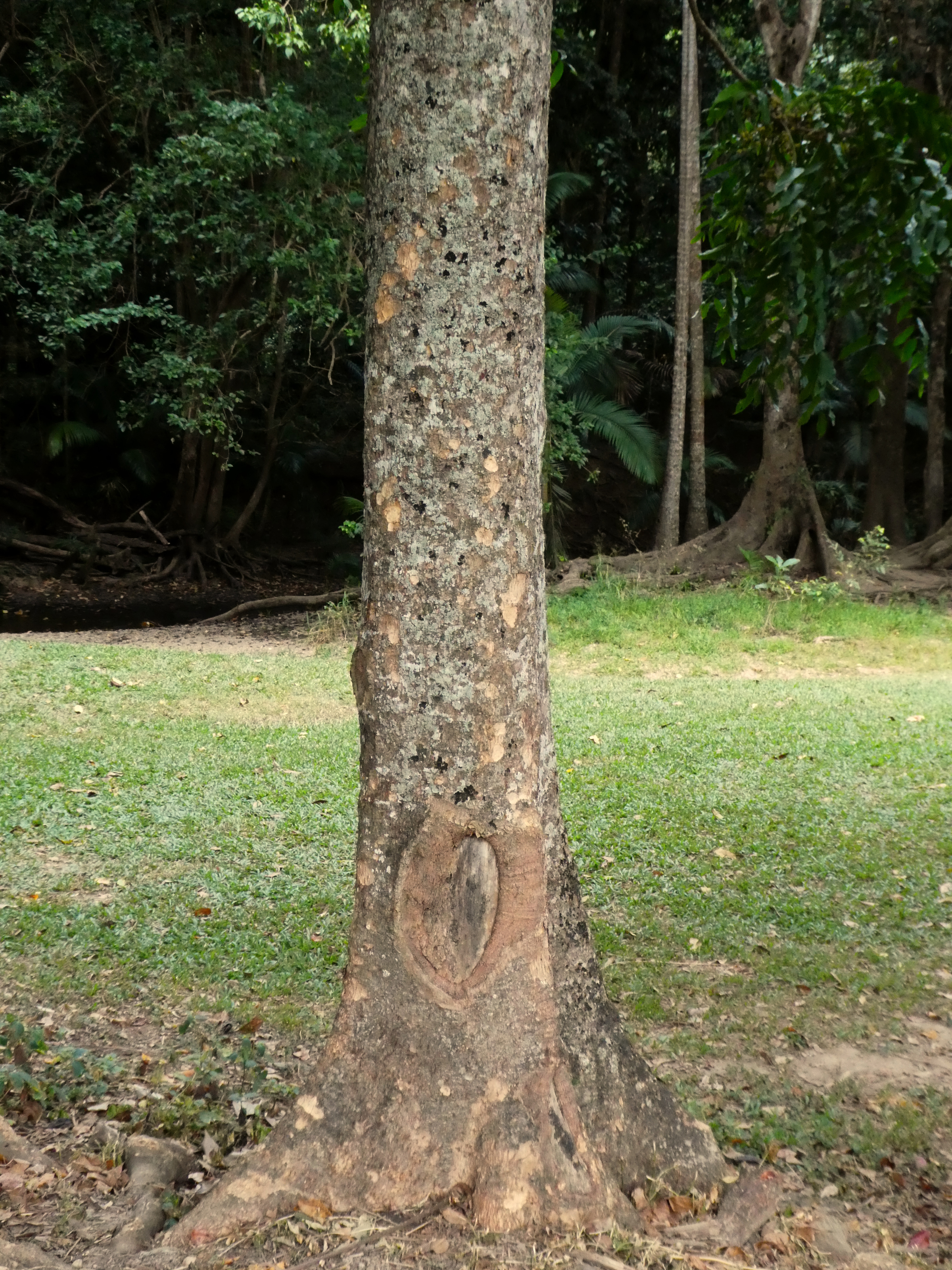
Trunk

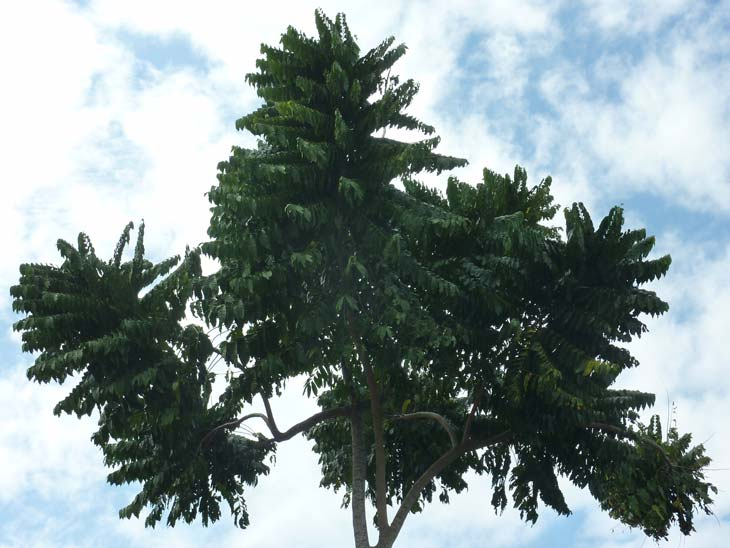
Clusters of large pinnately compound leaves

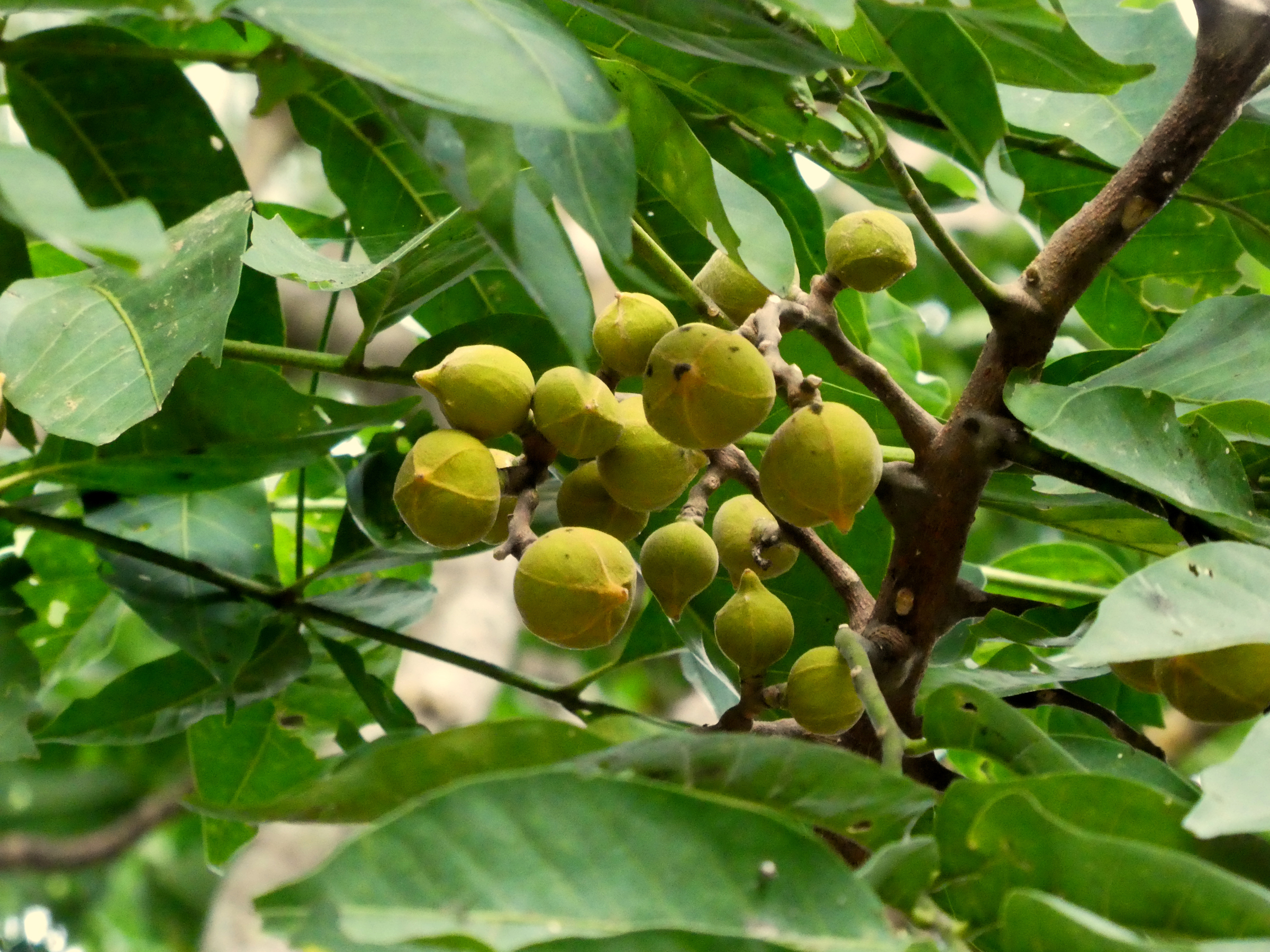
Developing fruit
