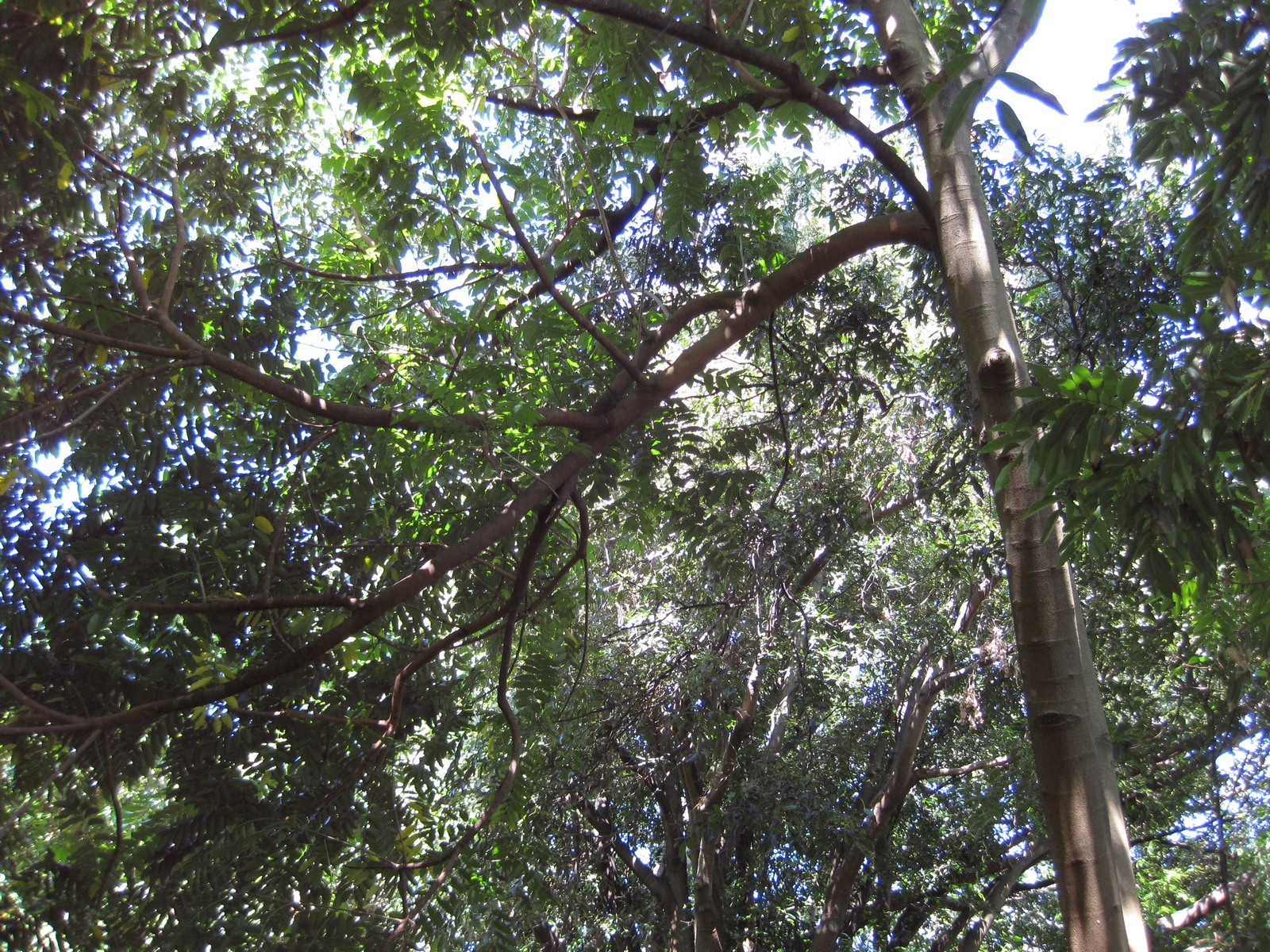
- At the Royal Botanic Garden, Sydney

Conservation status
- Least Concern (IUCN 3.1)

Scientific classification
- Kingdom: Plantae
- Clade: Tracheophytes
- Clade: Angiosperms
- Clade: Eudicots
- Clade: Rosids
- Order: Sapindales
- Family: Meliaceae
- Genus: Didymocheton
- Species: D. mollissimus

Binomial name
- Didymocheton mollissimus (Spreng.) Mabb. (2021)

Synonyms
- List: Alliaria mollis Kuntze (1891); Alliaria mollissima (Spreng.) Kuntze (1891); Alliaria schizochitoides (Turcz.) Kuntze (1891); Alliaria teysmannii (C.DC.) Kuntze (1891); Didymocheton hainanensis (Merr.) Harms (1940); Dysoxylum alliarum (Buch.-Ham.) N.P.Balakr. (1970); Dysoxylum filicifolium H.L.Li (1944); Dysoxylum floribundum Merr. (1914 publ. 1915); Dysoxylum hainanense Merr. (1928 publ. 1930); Dysoxylum hainanense var. glaberrimum F.C.How & T.C.Chen (1955); Dysoxylum hamiltonii Hiern (1875), nom. illeg.; Dysoxylum leptorrhachis Harms (1942); Dysoxylum mollissimum (Spreng.) Blume ex G.Don (1831); Dysoxylum mollissimum var. glaberrimum (F.C.How & T.C.Chen) P.Y.Chen (1997); Dysoxylum mollissimum var. sumatranum Miq. (1868); Dysoxylum mollissimum var. teysmannii (C.DC.) Koord. & Valeton (1896); Dysoxylum octandrum (Blanco) Merr. (1918); Dysoxylum schizochitoides (Turcz.) C.DC. (1878); Dysoxylum teysmannii C.DC. (1878); Guarea alliaria Buch.-Ham. (1832); Guarea mollis Wall. ex Hiern (1875); Hartighsea alliaria Arn. (1834); Hartighsea mollissima (Spreng.) A.Juss. (1830 publ. 1831); Hartighsea forsteri A.Juss. (1830 publ. 1831); Hartighsea schizochitoides Turcz. (1858); Macrochiton mollissimum (Spreng.) M.Roem. (1846); Scyphostigma philippinense M.Roem. (1846); Trichilia mollissima Spreng. (1827); Turraea octandra Blanco (1837)

= Didymocheton mollissimus =

Species of tree

Didymocheton mollissimus is a species of tree in the family Meliaceae. It ranges from eastern India and Bangladesh to southern China, Myanmar, Thailand, Peninsular Malaysia, Borneo, Sumatra, Java, the Lesser Sunda Islands, and the Philippines, where it grows in lowland tropical moist forests.

The species was first described as Trichilia mollissima by Kurt Polycarp Joachim Sprengel in 1827. The specific epithet mollissima is from the Latin meaning 'very soft', referring to the leaf hairs. It was later renamed Dysoxylum mollissimum. A study published in 2021 found the genus Dysoxylum to be polyphyletic, and the species was placed in the revived genus Didymocheton as D. mollisimus. The former subspecies Dysoxylum mollisimum subsp. molle, native from Sulawesi east to the Solomon Islands, is now recognised as a distinct species, Didymocheton mollis.
