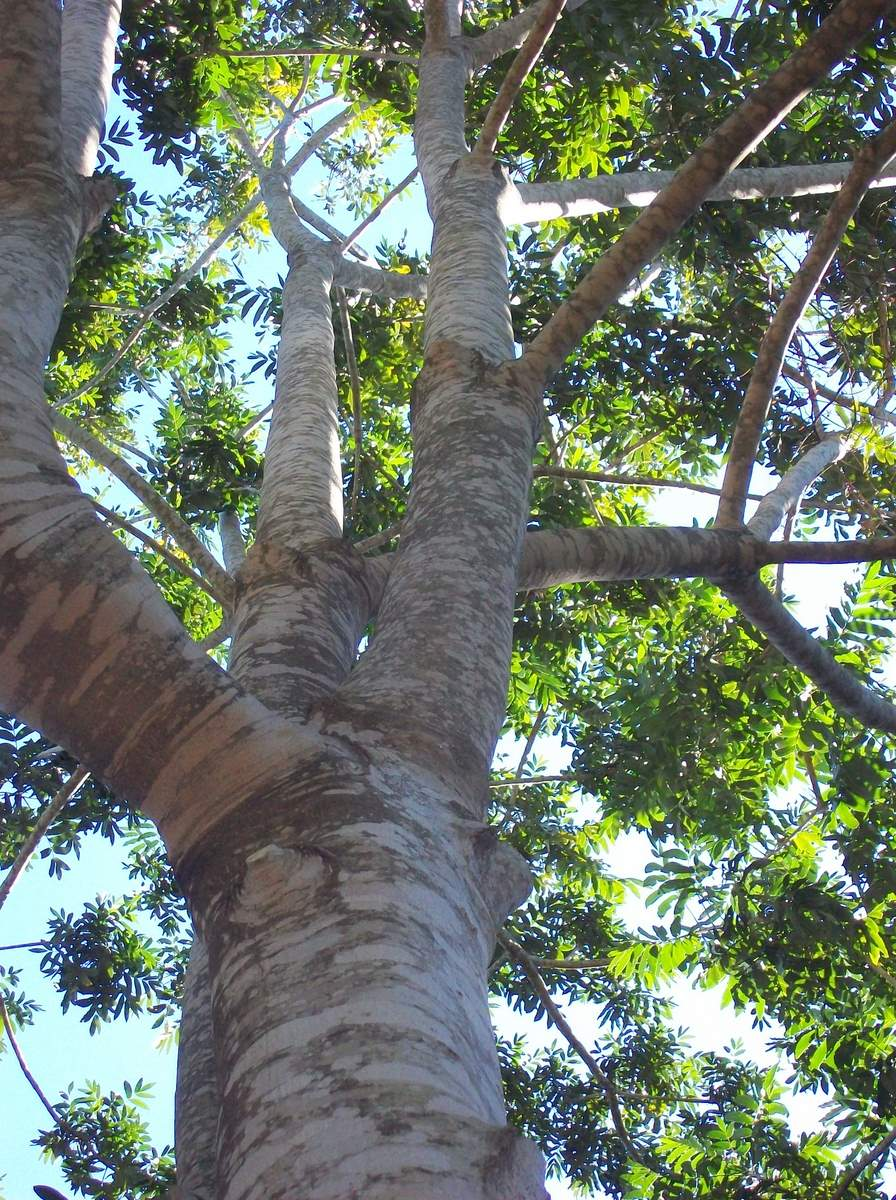

Scientific classification
- Kingdom: Plantae
- Clade: Tracheophytes
- Clade: Angiosperms
- Clade: Eudicots
- Clade: Rosids
- Order: Sapindales
- Family: Meliaceae
- Genus: Didymocheton
- Species: D. rufus

Binomial name
- Didymocheton rufus (A.Rich.) Harms (1940)

Synonyms
- Alliaria rufa (A.Rich.) Kuntze (1891); Dysoxlyum rufum (A.Rich.) Benth. (1863); Hartighsea rufa A.Rich. (1834) (basionym)

= Didymocheton rufus =

Species of tree

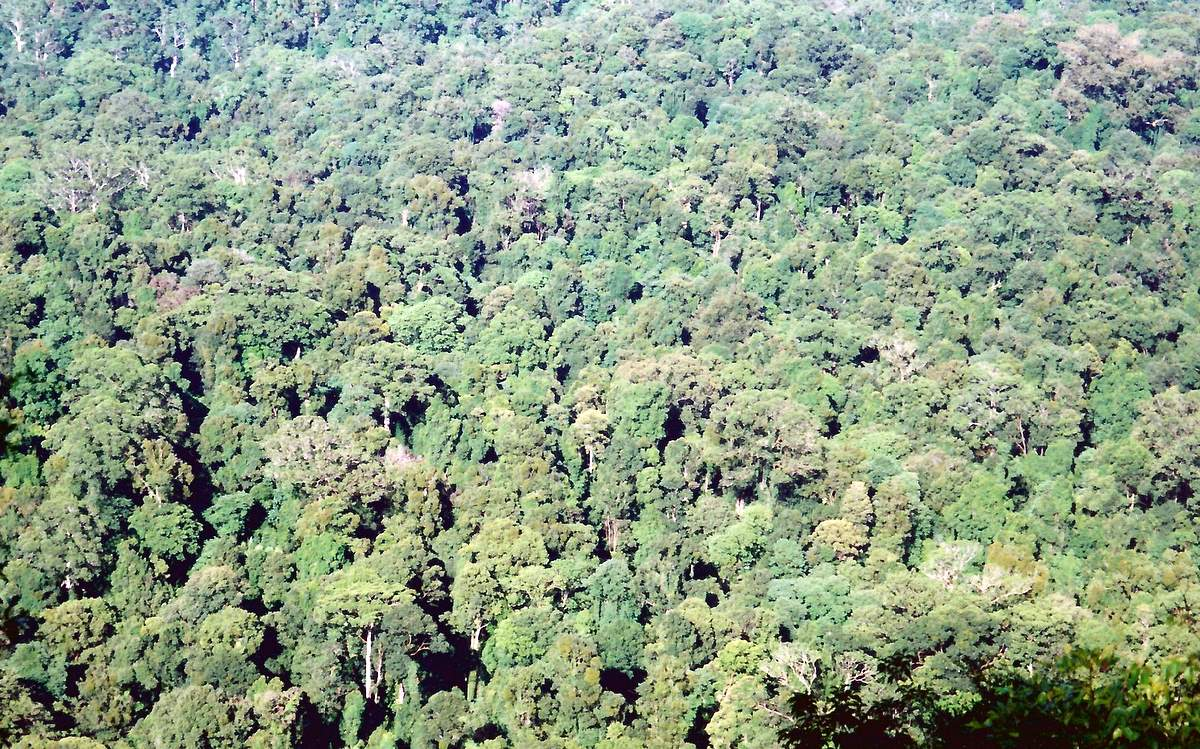
The hairy rosewood is a large tree in the tall rainforest at Murray Scrub, New South Wales

Didymocheton rufus is a rainforest tree in the family Meliaceae, found in eastern Australia. It occurs on a variety of different soils and rainforest types. From as far south as Bulahdelah, New South Wales to the McIlwraith Range in far north eastern Australia. The specific epithet rufus refers to the rusty red of the leaf, fruit and flower hairs of this species.

== Common names ==
Didymocheton rufus is known variously by the common names Australian mahogany, bastard pencil cedar, false rosewood, hairy rosewood, rusty mahogany, red bean, red heart, and rusty bean.

== Description ==
Usually a small to medium-sized tree. Though it reaches 40 metres tall with a stem diameter of 90 cm at Murray Scrub.

=== Leaves ===
Leaflets are nearly opposite on the stem, without serrations. Asymmetrical at the leaf base. Leaflets 5 to 17 cm long. Lanceolate to broad lanceolate in shape with a fine point at the leaf tip. Unusually, the leaflets are a dull green above the leaf, and a brighter green below. Hairy under the leaf. Leaflet stalks 2 to 3 mm long, but much longer for the terminal leaflet, where it is up to 25 mm long. The compound leaf contains around 19 leaflets. With a stalk 4 to 10 cm long.

=== Flowers, fruit and regeneration ===
Pleasantly scented white flowers form on panicles from December to February. The panicles form from the leaf axils. And when mature, the flower scent becomes less pleasant. The flower calyx is hairy.

The fruit is a round yellowish capsule, around 2 cm in diameter, mostly five-valved. Also covered with hairs which can irritate the skin. Seeds inside the capsule are cream, irregular in shape, and about 5 mm in diameter. Fruit ripens from April to December. Regeneration from fresh seed is relatively swift and reliable, taking as little as three weeks. After eight weeks, germination should be complete with good results.

== Timber ==
Onion scented wood. Mostly white with a red heartwood core which resembles the related red bean. Timber is vulnerable to attack from the lyctus borer.
