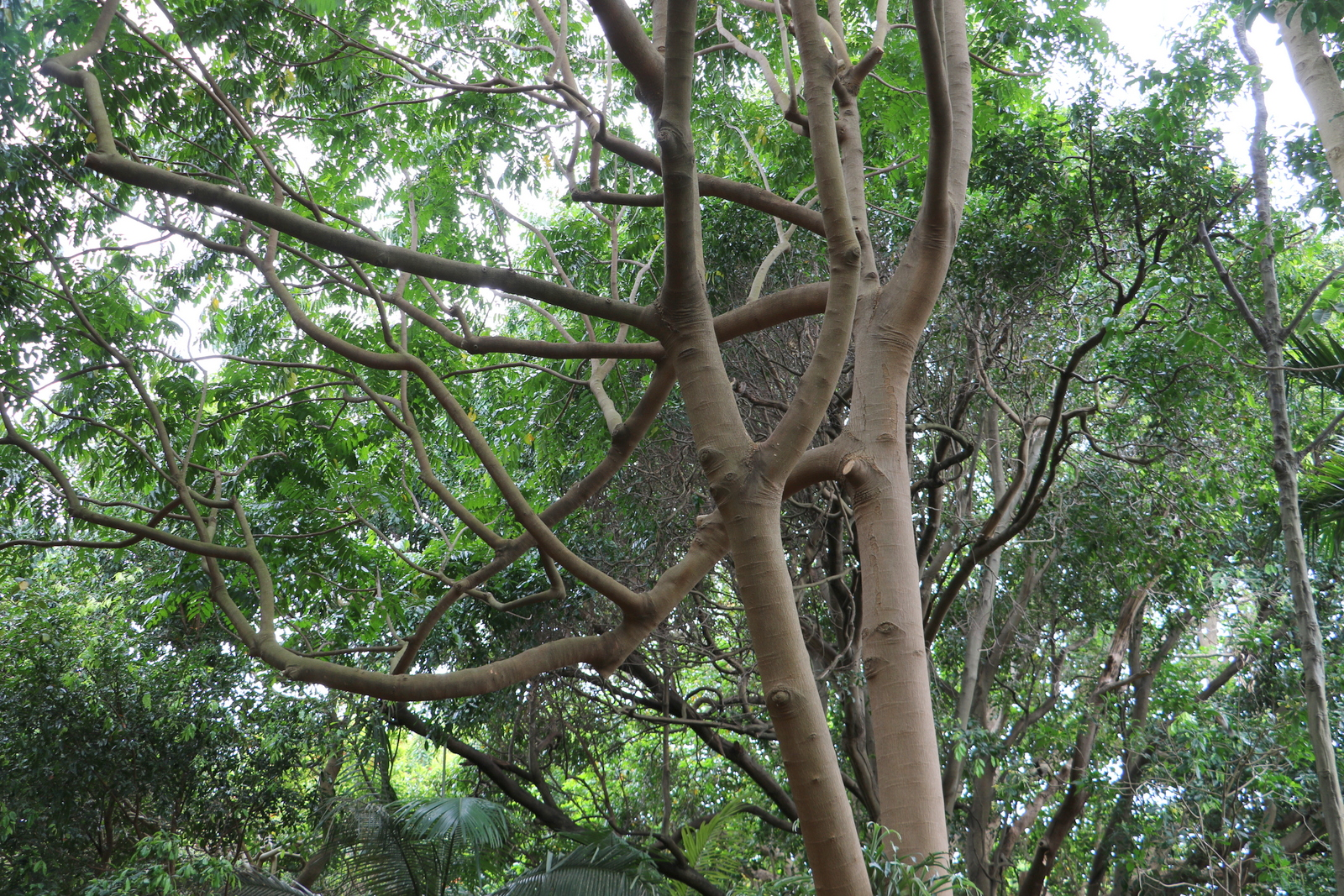
- Miva Mahogany at the Royal Botanic Gardens Sydney

Conservation status
- Least Concern (NCA)

Scientific classification
- Kingdom: Plantae
- Clade: Tracheophytes
- Clade: Angiosperms
- Clade: Eudicots
- Clade: Rosids
- Order: Sapindales
- Family: Meliaceae
- Genus: Didymocheton
- Species: D. muelleri

Binomial name
- Didymocheton muelleri (Benth.) Mabb. (2021)

Synonyms
- Alliaria muelleri (Benth.) Kuntze (1891); Dysoxylum muelleri Benth. (1863); Hartighsea trichosiphane F.Muell. ex C.DC. (1878)

= Didymocheton muelleri =

Miva mahogany

Subspecies of tree

Didymocheton muelleri, the red bean or Miva mahogany, is a rainforest tree in the family Meliaceae. It occurs in tropical, sub-tropical and littoral rainforests in eastern Australia, from the Bellinger River in New South Wales in the south, to the wet tropics of north-eastern Queensland. A signposted red bean tree may be seen near the car park of Victoria Park Nature Reserve in north-eastern New South Wales.

== Description ==
It is a large and impressive tree, up to 35 metres (115 ft) tall with a trunk diameter of 120 cm (47 in). It is usually buttressed or flanged at the base. The trunk is scaly and rough, grey or brown in colour. Freshly cut bark has an onion type scent.

=== Leaves ===
Leaflets are usually opposite on the stem, without serrations, and distinctly asymmetrical at the leaf base. Leaflets are 6 to 15 cm (2.4 to 5.9 in) long and 2 to 5 cm (0.79 to 1.97 in) wide, and are mid green above, paler below, and sometimes softly hairy under the leaf. True leaves are 30 to 60 cm (12 to 24 in) long, pinnate. Leaf stem swollen where joining the larger branch. Leaf venation is evident above and below, but raised and more noticeable below. Net veins easily seen. Veins creamy green, contrasting with the darker leaf colour.

=== Flowers and fruit ===
White flowers form on panicles from January to July. The fruit is a fawnish brown capsule, around 2 cm (0.79 in) in diameter. There is one reddish brown seed in each of the one to five cells. The fruit, which is bird attracting, ripens between November and March. Fresh seed is advised for regeneration.

== Taxonomy ==
The species was first described as Dysoxylum muelleri by George Bentham in 1863. In 1994 David Mabberley reclassified it as Dysoxylum mollissimum subsp. molle, including both the Australian populations and those in Sulawesi, Maluku, New Guinea, and the Bismarck Archipelago. A 2021 study by Holzmeyer, Hauenschild, Mabberley, et al. concluded that Dysoxylum was polyphyletic, and that the Australian population constituted a distinct species from the northern population. The species was placed in the revived genus Didymocheton, with the Australian population under the new combination Didymocheton muelleri, and the northern Sulawesi-to-Bismarck Archipelago population renamed Didymocheton mollis. The Australian population is still widely known as Dysoxylum mollisimum subsp. molle.

== Conservation ==
This species has been assessed by the Queensland Department of Environment and Science as least concern.

== Timber ==
The tree produces a well regarded mahogany timber, suited to cabinet work, carving and boat building. It is reddish brown and easily worked. Sapwood is creamy pink and not resistant to termites. There is concern of inhaling wood dust from this tree.

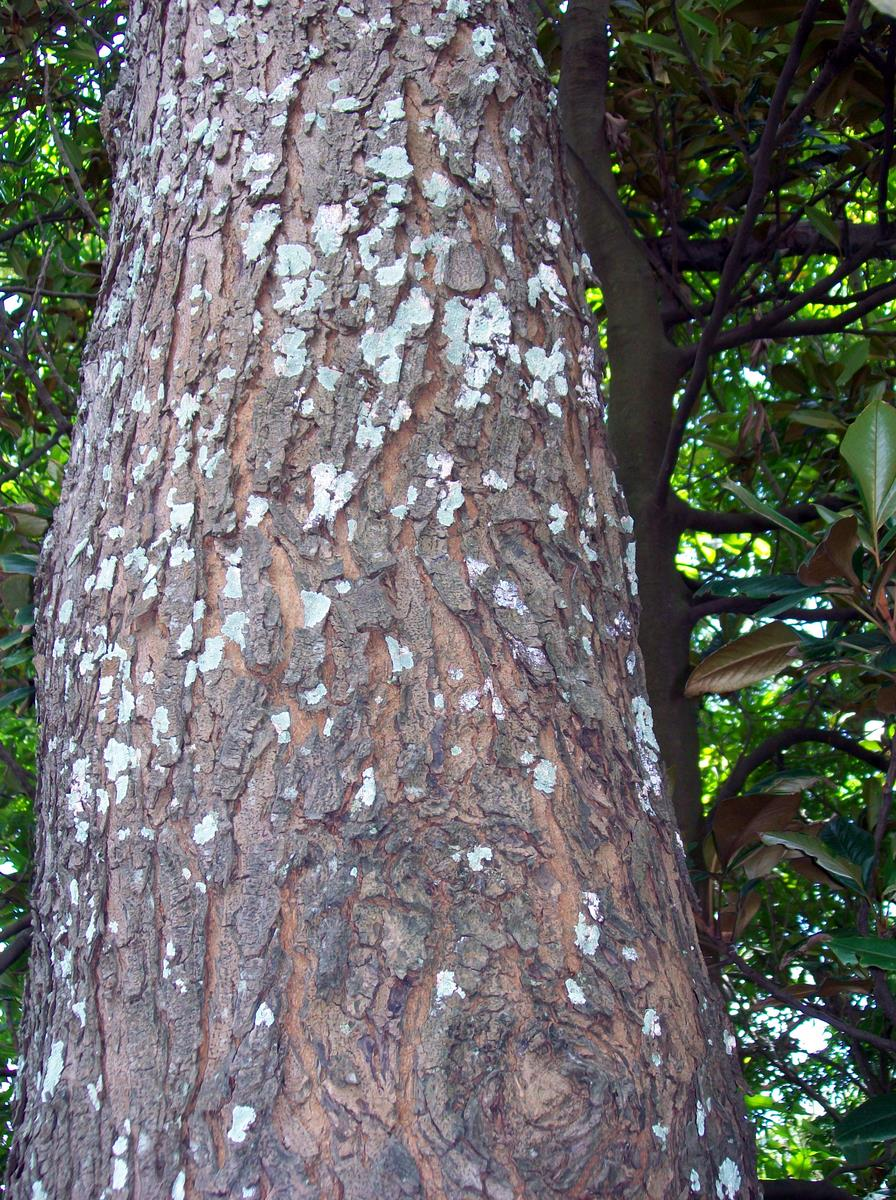
Red bean, Royal Botanic Gardens, Sydney
