= Structure of the Argentine Army =

The Structure of the Argentine Army follows below. As of 2020 the active force of the Argentine Army includes a total of eleven brigades:

- 2x Armored brigades (I, II)
- 2x Bush brigades (III, XII)
- 1x Airborne brigade (IV)
- 3x Mountain brigades (V, VI, VIII)
- 3x Mechanized brigades (IX, X, XI)

In addition to the brigades, there is also a number of specialized formations:

- Special Operations Forces Grouping
- Anti-aircraft Artillery Grouping 601 - School
- Army Aviation Grouping 601
- Engineer Grouping 601
- Signal Grouping 601

The "regiment" and "group" designators actually denote battalion-sized units ("regiment" being used for infantry and cavalry units and "group" used for artillery units).

== 1990s reorganization ==
Since the restoration of democracy in 1983, the Argentine Army was reduced both in number and budget and became a professional force. Some units were dissolved and other moved, including:

- the I Corps in Buenos Aires was dissolved
- the X Mechanized Brigade moved from Buenos Aires to La Pampa
- the VII Jungle Brigade was, in accordance with the friendship policy toward Brazil, dissolved

== Chief of the Army General Staff ==
- Chief of the Army General Staff (Jefe del Estado Mayor General del Ejército)
  - Chief of the Army General Staff Adjutand Secretariat (Secretaría Ayudantía del JEMGE)
  - Army Recruitment Assessment Commission (Comisión Evaluadora de Contrataciones del Ejército)
  - Army Main Inspectorate (Inspectoría General del Ejército)
  - Army Main Secretariat (Secretaría General del Ejército)
  - Plan, Programs and Budget Main Directorate (Dirección General de Planes, Programas y Presupuesto)
  - Administration and Finance Main Directorate (Dirección General de Administración y Finanzas)
  - Legal Affairs Main Directorate (Dirección General de Asuntos Jurídicos)
  - Army Social Work Institute (Instituto de Obra Social del Ejército)

=== Deputy Chief of the Army General Staff ===
The Deputy Chief of the Army General Staff commands the following organizations and departments of the Argentine Army:

- Deputy Chief of the Army General Staff (Subjefe del Estado Mayor General del Ejército)
  - Coordination Secretariat of the Deputy Chief of the Army General Staff (Secretaría de Coordinación del Subjefe del Estado Mayor General del Ejército)
  - Army General Staff Headquarters (Cuartel General del Estado Mayor General del Ejército)
  - Education Main Directorate(Dirección General de Educación)
  - Communication and Information Main Directorate (Dirección General de Comunicaciones e Informática)
    - Signal Battalion 602 (Batallón de Comunicaciones 602), in Buenos Aires
    - Satellite Signal Company (Compañía de Comunicaciones Satelital 601), in Campo de Mayo
  - Personnel and Welfare Main Directorate (Dirección General de Personal y Bienestar)
  - Medical Main Directorate (Dirección General de Salud)
    - Central Military Hospital, in Buenos Aires
    - Campo de Mayo Military Hospital, in Campo de Mayo
    - Regional Military Hospital Córdoba
    - Regional Military Hospital Mendoza
    - Regional Military Hospital Comodoro Rivadavia
    - Regional Military Hospital Paraná
    - Military Hospital Bahía Blanca
    - Military Hospital Salta
    - Military Hospital Río Gallegos
    - Military Hospital Curuzú Cuatiá
  - Intelligence Main Directorate (Dirección General de Inteligencia)
    - Intelligence Grouping "Campo de Mayo" (Agrupación de Inteligencia «Campo de Mayo»), in Campo de Mayo
      - Intelligence Support Battalion (Batallón Apoyo de Inteligencia), in Campo de Mayo
      - Signals Intelligence Company (Compañía de Inteligencia de Señales), in City Bell
      - Combat Intelligence Detachment 601 (Destacamento de Inteligencia de Combate 601), in Campo de Mayo
      - Geospatial Intelligence Center (Central de Inteligencia Geoespacial), in Campo de Mayo
      - Military Intelligence Center (Central de Inteligencia Militar), in Campo de Mayo
  - Research and Development Main Directorate (Dirección General de Investigación y Desarrollo)
  - Organization and Doctrine Main Directorate (Dirección General de Organización y Doctrina)
  - Materiel Main Directorate (Dirección General de Material), in Palermo
    - Arsenal Directorate (Dirección de Arsenales), in Boulogne Sur Mer
      - Arsenal Grouping 601 (Agrupación de Arsenales 601), in Boulogne Sur Mer
        - Arsenal Battalion 601 (Batallón de Arsenales 601), in Boulogne sur Mer
        - Arsenal Battalion 602 (Batallón de Arsenales 602), in Boulogne sur Mer
        - Arsenal Battalion 603 (Batallón de Arsenales 603), in San Lorenzo
        - Arsenal Battalion 604 (Batallón de Arsenales 604), in Holmberg
        - Electronic Materiel Maintenance Company 601 (Compañía de Mantenimiento de Materiales Electrónicos 601), in Boulogne Sur Mer
    - Transport Directorate (Dirección de Transporte), in Palermo
      - Transport Battalion 601 (Batallón de Transporte 601), in Boulogne Sur Mer
  - Quartermaster Directorate (Dirección de Intendencia)
    - Quartermaster Battalion 601 (Batallón de Intendencia 601), in El Palomar
  - Stable and Veterinary Directorate (Dirección de Remonta y Veterinaria)
  - Engineers and Infrastructure Directorate (Dirección de Ingenieros e Infraestructura)
  - Army General Staff Accounting and Finance Directorate (Dirección de Contaduría y Finanzas del Estado Mayor General del Ejército)
  - Army Historical Matters Directorate (Dirección de Asuntos Históricos del Ejército)

==== Buenos Aires Military Garrison Command ====
- Buenos Aires Military Garrison Command (Guarnición Militar Buenos Aires), in Campo de Mayo
  - Infantry Regiment 1 "Patricians" (Regimiento de Infantería 1 «Patricios»), in Palermo
  - Mounted Grenadier Regiment "General San Martín" (Regimiento de Granaderos a Caballo «General San Martín»), in Palermo
  - Artillery Regiment 1 "BGEN Tomas de Iriate" (Regimiento de Artillería 1 "General Iriarte"), in Campo de Mayo
  - Military Police Company 601 (Compañía Policía Militar 601), in Campo de Mayo

=== Army Training and Enlistment Command ===
- Army Training and Enlistment Command (Comando de Adiestramiento y Alistamiento del Ejército), in Campo de Mayo

The Army Training and Enlistment Command is responsible for the training and preparation of the operational units of the Argentinian Army.

==== 1st Army Division ====
- 1st Army Division (1.ª División de Ejército), in Curuzú Cuatiá
  - Engineer Battalion 1 (Batallón de Ingenieros 1), in Santo Tomé
  - Amphibious Engineer Battalion 121 (Batallón de Ingenieros Anfibio 121), in Santo Tomé
  - Signal Battalion 121 (Batallón de Comunicaciones 121), in Mercedes
  - Intelligence Battalion 121 (Batallón de Inteligencia 121), in Curuzú Cuatiá
  - Army Aviation Section 121 (Sección de Aviación de Ejército 121), in Resistencia
  - Garrison Guard Detachment "Crespo" (Destacamento de Vigilancia de Cuartel «Crespo»), in Crespo
  - Garrison Guard Detachment "Guadalupe" (Destacamento de Vigilancia de Cuartel «Guadalupe»), in Guadalupe Norte

===== II Armored Brigade =====
- II Armored Brigade (IIda Brigada Blindada), in Paraná
  - Reconnaissance Cavalry Regiment 12 (Regimiento de Caballería de Exploración 12), in Gualeguaychú
  - Tank Cavalry Regiment 1 (Regimiento de Caballería de Tanques 1), in Villaguay
  - Tank Cavalry Regiment 6 (Regimiento de Caballería de Tanques 6), in Concordia
  - Tank Cavalry Regiment 7 (Regimiento de Caballería de Tanques 7), in Chajarí
  - Mechanized Infantry Regiment 5 (Regimiento de Infantería Mecanizado 5), in Villaguay
  - Armored Artillery Group 2 (Grupo de Artillería Blindado 2), in Rosario del Tala
  - Armored Engineer Battalion 2 (Batallón de Ingenieros Blindado 2), in Concepción del Uruguay
  - Armored Signal Squadron 2 (Escuadrón de Comunicaciones Blindado 2), in Paraná
  - Armored Intelligence Squadron 2 (Escuadrón de Inteligencia Blindado 2), in Santa Fe
  - Logistic Support Base "Paraná" (Base de Apoyo Logístico "Paraná"), in Paraná
  - Logistic Support Base "San Lorenzo" (Base de Apoyo Logístico "San Lorenzo"), in San Lorenzo

===== III Bush Brigade =====
- III Bush Brigade (IIIra Brigada de Monte), in Resistencia
  - Mechanized Infantry Regiment 4 (Regimiento de Infantería Mecanizado 4), in Monte Caseros
  - Bush Infantry Regiment 28 (Regimiento de Infantería de Monte 28), in Tartagal
  - Bush Infantry Regiment 29 (Regimiento de Infantería de Monte 29), in Formosa
  - Bush Rangers Company 17 (Compañía de Cazadores de Monte 17), in Tartagal
  - Bush Artillery Group 12 (Grupo de Artillería de Monte 12), in Mercedes
  - Bush Engineer Company 3 (Compañía de Ingenieros de Monte 3), in Corrientes
  - Bush Signal Company 3 (Compañía de Comunicaciones de Monte 3), in Resistencia
  - Bush Intelligence Company 3 (Compañía de Inteligencia de Monte 3), in Resistencia
  - Bush Intelligence Section "Formosa" (Sección de Inteligencia de Monte «Formosa»), in Formosa
  - Bush Intelligence Section "Tartagal" (Sección de Inteligencia de Monte «Tartagal»), in Tartagal
  - Bush Army Aviation Section 3 (Sección de Aviación de Ejército de Monte 3), in Resistencia
  - Logistic Support Base "Resistencia" (Base de Apoyo Logístico "Resistencia"), in Resistencia
  - Logistic Support Base "Curuzú Cuatiá" (Base de Apoyo Logístico "Curuzú Cuatiá"), in Curuzú Cuatiá

===== XII Bush Brigade =====
- XII Bush Brigade (XIIda Brigada de Monte), in Posadas
  - Bush Infantry Regiment 9 (Regimiento de Infantería de Monte 9), in San Javier
  - Bush Infantry Regiment 30 (Regimiento de Infantería de Monte 30), in Apóstoles
  - Bush Rangers Company 18 (Compañía de Cazadores de Monte 18), in Bernardo de Irigoyen
  - Bush Artillery Group 3 (Grupo de Artillería de Monte 3), in Paso de los Libres
  - Bush Engineer Battalion 12 (Batallón de Ingenieros de Monte 12), in Goya
  - Bush Cavalry Reconnaissance Squadron 12 (Escuadrón de Exploración de Caballería de Monte 12), in Posadas
  - Bush Signal Company 12 (Compañía de Comunicaciones de Monte 12), in Posadas
  - Bush Intelligence Company 12 (Compañía de Inteligencia de Monte 12), in Posadas
  - Bush Intelligence Section "Iguazú" (Sección de Inteligencia de Monte «Iguazú»), in Iguazú
  - Bush Intelligence Section "Paso de los Libres" (Sección de Inteligencia de Monte «Paso de los Libres»), in Paso de los Libres
  - Bush Army Aviation Section 12 (Sección de Aviación de Ejército de Monte 12), in Posadas
  - Bush Arsenal Company 12 (Compañía de Arsenales de Monte 12), in Posadas
  - Medical Company 12 (Compañía de Sanidad 12), in Posadas
  - Garrison Guard Detachment "Paso de los Libres" (Destacamento de Vigilancia de Cuartel «Paso de los Libres»), in Paso de los Libres

==== 2nd Army Division ====
- 2nd Army Division Army of the North (2.ª División de Ejército), in Córdoba
  - Anti-aircraft Artillery Group 161 (Grupo de Artillería Antiaéreo 161), in San Luis
  - Signal Battalion 141 (Batallón de Comunicaciones 141), in Córdoba
  - Intelligence Battalion 141 (Batallón de Inteligencia 141), in Córdoba
  - Army Aviation Section 141 (Sección de Aviación de Ejército 141), in Córdoba
  - Garrison Guard Detachment "Santiago del Estero" (Destacamento de Vigilancia de Cuartel «Santiago del Estero»), in Santiago del Estero

===== V Mountain Brigade =====
- V Mountain Brigade (Vta Brigada de Montaña), in Salta
  - Mountain Reconnaissance Cavalry Regiment 5 (Regimiento de Caballería de Exploración de Montaña 5), in Salta
  - Mountain Infantry Regiment 15 (Regimiento de Infantería de Montaña 15), in La Rioja
  - Mountain Infantry Regiment 20 (Regimiento de Infantería de Montaña 20), in San Salvador de Jujuy
  - Mountain Rangers Company 5 (Compañía de Cazadores de Montaña 5), in San Salvador de Jujuy
  - Mountain Artillery Group 5 (Grupo de Artillería de Montaña 5), in San Salvador de Jujuy
  - Artillery Group 15 (Grupo de Artillería 15), in Salta
  - Mountain Engineer Battalion 5 (Batallón de Ingenieros de Montaña 5), in Salta
  - Mountain Construction Engineer Company 5 (Compañía de Ingenieros de Construcciones de Montaña 5), in La Rioja
  - Mountain Signal Company 5 (Compañía de Comunicaciones de Montaña 5), in Salta
  - Mountain Intelligence Company 5 (Compañía de Inteligencia de Montaña 5), in Salta
  - Mountain Intelligence Section "Jujuy" (Sección de Inteligencia de Montaña «Jujuy»), in San Salvador de Jujuy
  - Forward Deployed Intelligence Section "La Rioja" (Sección de Inteligencia Adelantada «La Rioja»), in La Rioja
  - Mountain Army Aviation Section 5 (Sección de Aviación de Ejército de Montaña 5), in Salta
  - Logistic Support Base "Salta" (Base de Apoyo Logístico "Salta"), in Salta
  - Garrison Guard Group "San Antonio de los Cobres" (Grupo de Vigilancia de Cuartel «San Antonio de los Cobres»), in San Antonio de los Cobres

===== VI Mountain Brigade =====
- VI Mountain Brigade (VIta Brigada de Montaña), in Neuquén
  - Mountain Reconnaissance Cavalry Regiment 4 (Regimiento de Caballería de Exploración de Montaña 4), in San Martín de los Andes
  - Mountain Infantry Regiment 10 (Regimiento de Infantería de Montaña 10), in Covunco Centro
  - Mountain Infantry Regiment 21 (Regimiento de Infantería de Montaña 21), in Las Lajas
  - Mountain Infantry Regiment 26 (Regimiento de Infantería de Montaña 26), in Junín de los Andes
  - Mountain Rangers Company 6 (Compañía de Cazadores de Montaña 6), in Primeros Pinos
  - Mountain Artillery Group 6 (Grupo de Artillería de Montaña 6), in Junín de los Andes
  - Artillery Group 16 (Grupo de Artillería 16), in Zapala
  - Mountain Engineer Battalion 6 (Batallón de Ingenieros de Montaña 6), in Neuquén
  - Mountain Signal Company 6 (Compañía de Comunicaciones de Montaña 6), in Neuquén
  - Mountain Intelligence Company 6 (Compañía de Inteligencia de Montaña 5), in Neuquén
  - Mountain Intelligence Section "Bariloche" (Sección de Inteligencia de Montaña «Bariloche»), in Bariloche
  - Mountain Army Aviation Section 6 (Sección de Aviación de Ejército de Montaña 6), in Neuquén
  - Logistic Support Base "Neuquén" (Base de Apoyo Logístico "Neuquén"), in Zapala

===== VIII Mountain Brigade =====
- VIII Mountain Brigade (VIIIva Brigada de Montaña), in Mendoza
  - Mountain Reconnaissance Cavalry Regiment 15 (Regimiento de Caballería de Exploración de Montaña 15), in Campo de los Andes
  - Mountain Infantry Regiment 11 (Regimiento de Infantería de Montaña 11), in Tupungato
  - Mountain Infantry Regiment 16 (Regimiento de Infantería de Montaña 16), in Uspallata
  - Mountain Infantry Regiment 22 (Regimiento de Infantería de Montaña 22), in El Marquesado
  - Mountain Rangers Company 8 (Compañía de Cazadores de Montaña 8), in Puente del Inca
  - Artillery Group 7 (Grupo de Artillería 7), in San Luis
  - Mountain Artillery Group 8 (Grupo de Artillería de Montaña 8), in Uspallata
  - Mountain Engineer Battalion 8 (Batallón de Ingenieros de Montaña 8), in Campo de los Andes
  - Mountain Signal Company 8 (Compañía de Comunicaciones de Montaña 8), in Mendoza
  - Mountain Intelligence Company 8 (Compañía de Inteligencia de Montaña 5), in Mendoza
  - Mountain Intelligence Section "San Rafael" (Sección de Inteligencia de Montaña «San Rafael»), in San Rafael
  - Mountain Army Aviation Section 8 (Sección de Aviación de Ejército de Montaña 8), in Mendoza
  - Logistic Support Base "Mendoza" (Base de Apoyo Logístico "Mendoza"), in Mendoza

==== 3rd Army Division ====
- 3rd Army Division (3.ª División de Ejército), in Bahía Blanca
  - Signal Battalion 181 (Batallón de Comunicaciones 181), in Bahía Blanca
  - Intelligence Battalion 181 (Batallón de Inteligencia 181), in Bahía Blanca
  - Army Aviation Section 181 (Sección de Aviación de Ejército 181), in Bahía Blanca

===== I Armored Brigade =====
- I Armored Brigade (Ira Brigada Blindada), in Tandil
  - Tank Cavalry Regiment 2 (Regimiento de Caballería de Tanques 2), in Olavarría
  - Tank Cavalry Regiment 8 (Regimiento de Caballería de Tanques 8), in Magdalena
  - Tank Cavalry Regiment 10 (Regimiento de Caballería de Tanques 10), in Azul
  - Mechanized Infantry Regiment 7 (Regimiento de Infantería Mecanizado 7), in Arana
  - Armored Artillery Group 1 (Grupo de Artillería Blindado 1), in Azul
  - Armored Cavalry Reconnaissance Squadron 1 (Escuadrón de Exploración de Caballería Blindado 1), in Arana
  - Armored Engineer Squadron 1 (Escuadrón de Ingenieros Blindado 1), in Olavarría
  - Armored Signal Squadron 1 (Escuadrón de Comunicaciones Blindado 1), in Tandil
  - Armored Intelligence Squadron 1 (Escuadrón de Inteligencia Blindado 1), in Tandil
  - Logistic Support Base "Tandil" (Base de Apoyo Logístico "Tandil"), in Tandil

===== IX Mechanized Brigade =====
- IX Mechanized Brigade (IXna Brigada Mecanizada), in Comodoro Rivadavia
  - Reconnaissance Cavalry Regiment 3 (Regimiento de Caballería de Exploración 3), in Esquel
  - Tank Cavalry Regiment 9 (Regimiento de Caballería de Tanques 9), in Puerto Deseado
  - Mechanized Infantry Regiment 8 (Regimiento de Infantería Mecanizado 8), in Comodoro Rivadavia
  - Mechanized Infantry Regiment 25 (Regimiento de Infantería Mecanizado 25), in Sarmiento
  - Armored Artillery Group 9 (Grupo de Artillería Blindado 9), in Sarmiento
  - Mechanized Engineer Battalion 9 (Batallón de Ingenieros Mecanizado 9), in Rio Mayo
  - Mechanized Signal Company 9 (Compañía de Comunicaciones Mecanizada 9), in Comodoro Rivadavia
  - Mechanized Intelligence Company 9 (Compañía de Inteligencia Mecanizada 9), in Comodoro Rivadavia
  - Forward Deployed Intelligence Section "Esquel" (Sección de Inteligencia Adelantada «Esquel»), in Esquel
  - Army Aviation Section 9 (Sección de Aviación de Ejército 9), in Comodoro Rivadavia
  - Logistic Support Base "Comodoro Rivadavia" (Base de Apoyo Logístico "Comodoro Rivadavia"), in Comodoro Rivadavia

===== XI Mechanized Brigade =====
- XI Mechanized Brigade (XIra Brigada Mecanizada), in Río Gallegos
  - Tank Cavalry Regiment 11 (Regimiento de Caballería de Tanques 11), in Puerto Santa Cruz
  - Mechanized Infantry Regiment 24 (Regimiento de Infantería Mecanizado 24), in Río Gallegos
  - Mechanized Infantry Regiment 35 (Regimiento de Infantería Mecanizado 35), in Rospentek
  - Armored Artillery Group 11 (Grupo de Artillería Blindado 11), in Comandante Luis Piedrabuena
  - Mechanized Engineer Battalion 11 (Batallón de Ingenieros Mecanizado 11), in Comandante Luis Piedrabuena
  - Armored Cavalry Reconnaissance Squadron 11 (Escuadrón de Exploración de Caballería Blindado 11), in Rospentek
  - Mechanized Signal Company 11 (Compañía de Comunicaciones Mecanizada 11), in Río Gallegos
  - Mechanized Intelligence Company 11 (Compañía de Inteligencia Mecanizada 2), in Río Gallegos
  - Mechanized Intelligence Section "El Turbio" (Sección de Inteligencia Mecanizada «El Turbio»), in Rospentek
  - Army Aviation Section 11 (Sección de Aviación de Ejército 11), in Río Gallegos
  - Ammunition Company 181 (Compañía de Munición 181), in Puerto Santa Cruz
  - Logistic Support Base "Río Gallegos" (Base de Apoyo Logístico "Río Gallegos"), in Río Gallegos

===== Anti-aircraft Artillery Grouping 601 - School =====
- Anti-aircraft Artillery Grouping 601 - School (Agrupación de Artillería Antiaérea de Ejército 601 - Escuela), in Mar del Plata
  - Anti-aircraft Artillery Group 601 (Grupo de Artillería Antiaéreo 601), in Mar del Plata
  - Mixed Anti-aircraft Artillery Group 602 (Grupo de Artillería Antiaéreo Mixto 602), in Mar del Plata
  - Anti-aircraft Artillery Systems Maintenance Group 601 (Grupo de Mantenimiento de Sistemas de Artillería Antiaéreos 601), in Mar del Plata)

==== Rapid Deployment Force ====
- Rapid Deployment Force (Fuerza de Despliegue Rápido), in Campo de Mayo
  - Rapid Deployment Force Signal Company (Compañía de Comunicaciones de la Fuerza de Despliegue Rápido), in Campo de Mayo
  - Rapid Deployment Intelligence Section (Sección de Inteligencia de Despliegue Rápido), in Campo de Mayo
  - Rapid Deployment Army Aviation Section (Sección de Aviación de Ejército de Despliegue Rápido), in Campo de Mayo

===== IV Airborne Brigade =====
- IV Airborne Brigade (IVta Brigada Aerotransportada), in Córdoba
  - Paratrooper Infantry Regiment 2 (Regimiento de Infantería Paracaidista 2), in Córdoba
  - Paratrooper Infantry Regiment 14 (Regimiento de Infantería Paracaidista 14), in Córdoba
  - Air Assault Regiment 601 (Regimiento de Asalto Aéreo 601), in Campo de Mayo
  - Paratrooper Artillery Group 4 (Grupo de Artillería Paracaidista 4), in Córdoba
  - Paratrooper Cavalry Reconnaissance Squadron 4 (Escuadrón de Exploración de Caballería Paracaidista 4), in Córdoba
  - Paratrooper Engineer Company 4 (Compañía de Ingenieros Paracaidista 4), in Córdoba
  - Paratrooper Signal Company 4 (Compañía de Comunicaciones Paracaidista 4), in Córdoba
  - Paratrooper Aerial Launch Support Company 4 (Compañía de Apoyo de Lanzamientos Aéreos Paracaidista 4), in Córdoba
  - Paratroopers Intelligence Section (Sección de Inteligencia Paracaidista), in Córdoba
  - Logistic Support Base "Córdoba" (Base de Apoyo Logístico "Córdoba"), in Córdoba

===== X Mechanized Brigade =====
- X Mechanized Brigade (Xma Brigada Mecanizada), in Santa Rosa
  - Tank Cavalry Regiment 13 (Regimiento de Caballería de Tanques 13), in General Pico
  - Mechanized Infantry Regiment 3 (Regimiento de Infantería Mecanizado 3), in Pigüé
  - Mechanized Infantry Regiment 6 (Regimiento de Infantería Mecanizado 6), in Toay
  - Mechanized Infantry Regiment 12 (Regimiento de Infantería Mecanizado 12), in Toay
  - Artillery Group 10 (Grupo de Artillería 10), in Junín
  - Multiple Launch Systems Artillery Group 601 (Grupo de Artillería de Sistemas de Lanzadores Múltiples 601), in San Luis
  - Mechanized Engineer Company 10 (Compañía de Ingenieros Mecanizada 10), in Santa Rosa
  - Mechanized Signal Company 10 (Compañía de Comunicaciones Mecanizada 10), in Santa Rosa
  - Mechanized Intelligence Company 10 (Compañía de Inteligencia Mecanizada 10), in Santa Rosa
  - Logistic Support Base "Pigüé" (Base de Apoyo Logístico "Pigüé"), in Pigüé

===== Special Operations Forces Grouping =====
- Special Operations Forces Grouping (Agrupación de Fuerzas de Operaciones Especiales), in Córdoba
  - Special Forces Company 601 (Compañía de Fuerzas Especiales 601), in Córdoba
  - Commando Company 601 (Compañía de Comandos 601), in Campo de Mayo
  - Commando Company 602 (Compañía de Comandos 602), in Córdoba
  - Commando Company 603 (Compañía de Comandos 603), in Bahia Blanca
  - Special Operations Forces Support Company 601 (Compañía de Apoyo de Fuerzas de Operaciones Especiales 601), in Campo de Mayo

==== Army Aviation Command ====
- Army Aviation Command (Comando de Aviación del Ejército), in Campo de Mayo
  - Army Aviation Grouping 601 (Agrupación de Aviación de Ejército 601), in Campo de Mayo
    - Assault Helicopter Battalion 601 (Batallón de Helicópteros de Asalto 601), in Campo de Mayo
    - Combat Support Aviation Battalion 601 (Batallón de Aviación de Apoyo de Combate 601), in Campo de Mayo
    - Supply and Aircraft Maintenance Battalion 601 (Batallón de Abastecimiento y Mantenimiento de Aeronaves 601), in Campo de Mayo
    - Attack and Reconnaissance Aviation Squadron 602 (Escuadrón de Aviación de Exploración y Ataque 602), in Campo de Mayo
    - Support Aviation Squadron 604 (Escuadrón de Aviación de Apoyo 604), in Campo de Mayo

==== Engineer Grouping 601 ====
- Engineer Grouping 601 (Agrupación de Ingenieros 601), in Campo de Mayo
  - Engineer Battalion 601 (Batallón de Ingenieros 601), in Campo de Mayo
  - CBRN and Emergency Support Engineer Company 601 (Compañía de Ingenieros QBN y de Apoyo a la Emergencia 601), in San Nicolás de los Arroyos
  - Installations Maintenance Engineer Company 601 (Compañía de Ingenieros de Mantenimiento de Instalaciones 601), in Villa Martelli
  - Army Divers Engineer Company 601 (Compañía de Ingenieros de Buzos de Ejército 601), in Campo de Mayo
  - Water Engineer Company 601 (Compañía de Ingenieros de Agua 601), in Campo de Mayo

==== Signal Grouping 601 ====
- Signal Grouping 601 (Agrupación de Comunicaciones 601), in City Bell
  - Signal Battalion 601 (Batallón de Comunicaciones 601), in City Bell
  - Electronic Operations Battalion 601 (Batallón de Operaciones Electrónicas 601), in City Bell
  - Signal Maintenance Battalion 601 (Batallón de Mantenimiento de Comunicaciones 601), in City Bell

== Graphic overview of the Argentine Army ==
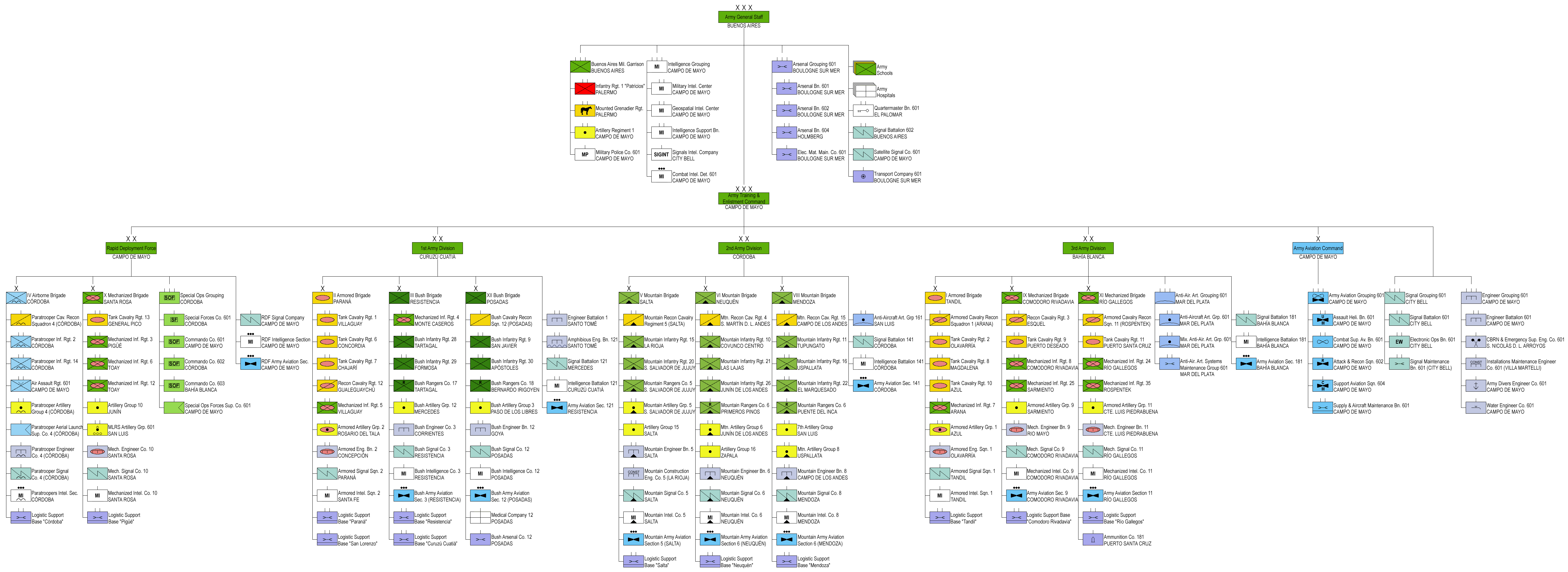
Structure of the Argentine Army 2020 (click to enlarge)

== Geographic distribution of operational forces ==
Armored Mechanized Mountain Bush Paratroopers Special Forces
Anti-aircraft Artillery Helicopters Engineers Signals Other units
Locations with multiple units; units listed in the table below

Córdoba	Campo de Mayo
2nd Division; IV Airborne Brigade; Special Operations Forces Grouping	Rapid Deployment Force; Army Aviation Command; Buenos Aires Military Garrison; Intelligence Grouping; Engineer Grouping 601
