= Albano Harguindeguy =

Argentinian military officer, politician and criminal (1927–2012)

Albano Eduardo Harguindeguy
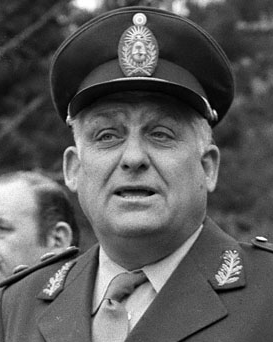
- Albano Harguindeguy
- Born: 11 February 1927; Villa Valeria, Córdoba, Argentina
- Died: 29 October 2012 (aged 85); Los Polvorines, Buenos Aires Province, Argentina
- Education: Colegio Militar de la Nación
- Spouse: Juana Regina Villafañe
- Children: 5
- Military career
- Allegiance: Argentina
- Branch: Argentine Army
- Service years: 1945–1981
- Rank: (pre-1991 epaulette) Divisional general
- Nickname: "Vasco"
- Commands: I Armoured Cavalry Brigade
- Known for: Crimes against humanity
- Conflicts: none

Signature
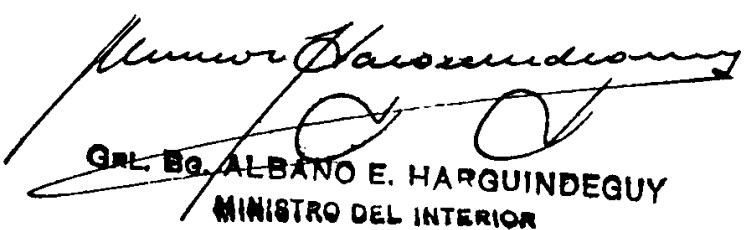

Albano Eduardo Harguindeguy (Spanish: [alˈβano aɾɣindeˈɣuj]; 11 February 1927 – 29 October 2012) was an Argentine Army officer who reached the rank of divisional general. He headed the Argentine Ministry of the Interior during the military dictatorship that called itself the National Reorganization Process (Spanish: Proceso de Reorganización Nacional), which held sway in the country from 1976 to 1983. At the time of his death, he was being prosecuted for crimes against humanity. He was one of the Dirty War figures who received a pardon from President Carlos Menem in 1989.

== Family ==
Harguindeguy was married to Juana Regina Villafañe, with whom he had five children: Patricia, Cecilia, Guillermo, Eduardo and Mariana.

== Career ==
After finishing at the General San Martín Military High School (Spanish: Liceo Militar General San Martín) – where Leopoldo Fortunato Galtieri, Jorge Isaac Anaya and Raúl Alfonsín were among his fellow graduates – Harguindeguy entered the Colegio Militar de la Nación (National Military College) as a cadet on 1 February 1943. In late 1945, he left the College as a cavalry gun sub-lieutenant. In 1954, when he was a captain, he completed the course for a General Staff Officer at the Escuela Superior de Guerra (War College) and served as head of the Military College Cavalry Squadron. He was second in command of the Mounted Grenadiers Regiment (Spanish: Regimiento de Granaderos a Caballo) in 1958.

In June 1972, after having reached the rank of divisional general, Harguindeguy was named acting commander of the I Armoured Cavalry Brigade, and two years later he was confirmed in that post as the titular commander. In August 1974, he was named Second Commander and Chief of the I Army Corps's General Staff.

Harguindeguy was designated Chief of the Argentine Federal Police on 30 January 1975 by President María Estela Martínez de Perón Less than 14 months later, he took part in overthrowing her. The new dictator, Jorge Rafael Videla, named him Minister of the Interior After taking on the new post of Interior Minister, Harguindeguy left his post as Federal Police Chief, which was then taken over by then-Brigade General Cesáreo Cardozo on 31 March 1976. Functioning within the Ministry's scope was the Federal Police, which ran the clandestine detention centres called El Club Atlético ("The Athletic Club"), the Garaje Azopardo and El Olimpo (in the Automotive Division), among others, along with the Federal Security Superintendency. Moreover, this police force had delegations in various cities throughout the country.

Beginning on 6 November 1978, Harguindeguy was left in temporary charge of the Ministry of Planning after Carlos Laidlaw's resignation. This same ministry would be dissolved and replaced with a secretariate on 14 December of the same year.

When Jorge Rafael Videla was about to leave power, Harguindeguy aspired to become the de facto president. He was counting on the Argentine Navy's support in this. Nevertheless, the one who was chosen was Lieutenant General Roberto Eduardo Viola.

== Crimes against humanity ==
During Argentina's Dirty War, Harguindeguy is alleged to have participated in crimes against humanity and to have been influenced by torture methods developed by the French in the Algerian War, and by the training and indoctrination that he had received in this regard at the School of the Americas, then in the Panama Canal Zone, a United States territory.

=== First judgement ===
During Raúl Alfonsín's presidency in the 1980s, Harguindeguy was judged for Decree 2840, in which executive power was brought to bear on two businessmen named Federico and Miguel Gutheim, who had been imprisoned until April 1977, an act later considered to be kidnapping as it sought to pressure the two into having their cotton company enter into an export deal with Hong Kong.

Harguindeguy found himself charged in connection with this, and being held in pre-trial detention, as confirmed by federal authority; however, he later also found himself among those receiving pardons from President Carlos Menem in 1989, together with other military officers who had participated in the repression between 1976 and 1983.

=== Second judgement ===
In 2006, another judge revoked Harguindeguy's pardon, along with Videla's and former Economic Minister José Alfredo Martínez de Hoz's. All three were kept in pre-trial custody in the form of house arrest. He was charged, and a sentence was expected by late 2012 or early the next year.

Once the said pardons had been quashed, having been declared unconstitutional, Harguindeguy was once again tried for various crimes, among which were ordering the murder of the Movement of Priests for the Third World (which had led to, among other things, Bishop Enrique Angelelli's killing), illicit association, being the one directly responsible for murdering Norma González, Sixto Zalasar, Julio Solaga and Oscar de Zorzi, through twenty-five illegal deprivations of liberty, torture and illegal raids in Concordia, Gualeguaychú and Concepción del Uruguay. In 2004, Harguindeguy refused to testify before an investigating judge (juez de instrucción) about illegal detentions and murders arising from Operation Condor, and he was thus put under house arrest.

== Death ==
Harguindeguy died at his villa in Los Polvorines on 29 October 2012, at the age of 85, still under house arrest. At the time of his death, no sentence had yet been pronounced on him even after more than five years on trial for crimes against humanity.

== See also ==
- Dirty War
- National Reorganization Process
- Human rights
