= Army Enlistment and Training Command =

- Comando de Adiestramiento y Alistamiento del Ejército
- Country: Argentina
- Branch: Argentine Army
- Type: Command
- Garrison/HQ: Campo de Mayo

The Army Enlistment and Training Command is an Argentine Army command. It is headquartered at Campo de Mayo, Buenos Aires Province. It is responsible of the Army units commanding.

== Organization ==
- 1st Army Division «Teniente General Juan Carlos Sánchez»
- 2nd Army Division «Ejército del Norte»
- 3rd Army Division «Teniente General Julio Argentino Roca»
- Rapid Deployment Force
- 601 Engineer Grouping
- 601 Communications Grouping
- Army Aviation Command

In 2019 the 601 Engineer Grouping, 601 Communications Grouping and the Army Aviation Command became part of the Army Enlistment and Training Command.
