= 4th Military Region =

4th Military Region may refer to:

- 4th Military Region (Argentina)
- 4th Military Region (People's Army of Vietnam)
- 4th Military Region (Yemen)
