= VI Mountain Brigade =

The 6th Mountain Infantry Brigade is a unit of the Argentine Army specialised in mountain warfare. The headquarters of this unit is based at Neuquén, Neuquén Province. It is part of the 2nd Army Division.

The units that form this Brigade are:

- 10th "Teniente General Racedo" Mountain Infantry Regiment, Covunco, Neuquén.
- 21st "Teniente General Rufino Ortega" Mountain Infantry Regiment, Las Lajas, Neuquén.
- 26th "Coronel Benjamín Moritán" Mountain Infantry Regiment, Junín de los Andes, Neuquén.
- 6th Mountain Cazadores Company, Primeros Pinos, Neuquén.
- 4th "Coraceros General Lavalle" Mountain Cavalry Regiment, San Martín de los Andes, Neuquén.
- 6th Mountain Artillery Group, Junín de los Andes, Neuquén.
- 16th Artillery Group, Zapala, Neuquén.
