= Cazadores de Monte (Argentine Army) =

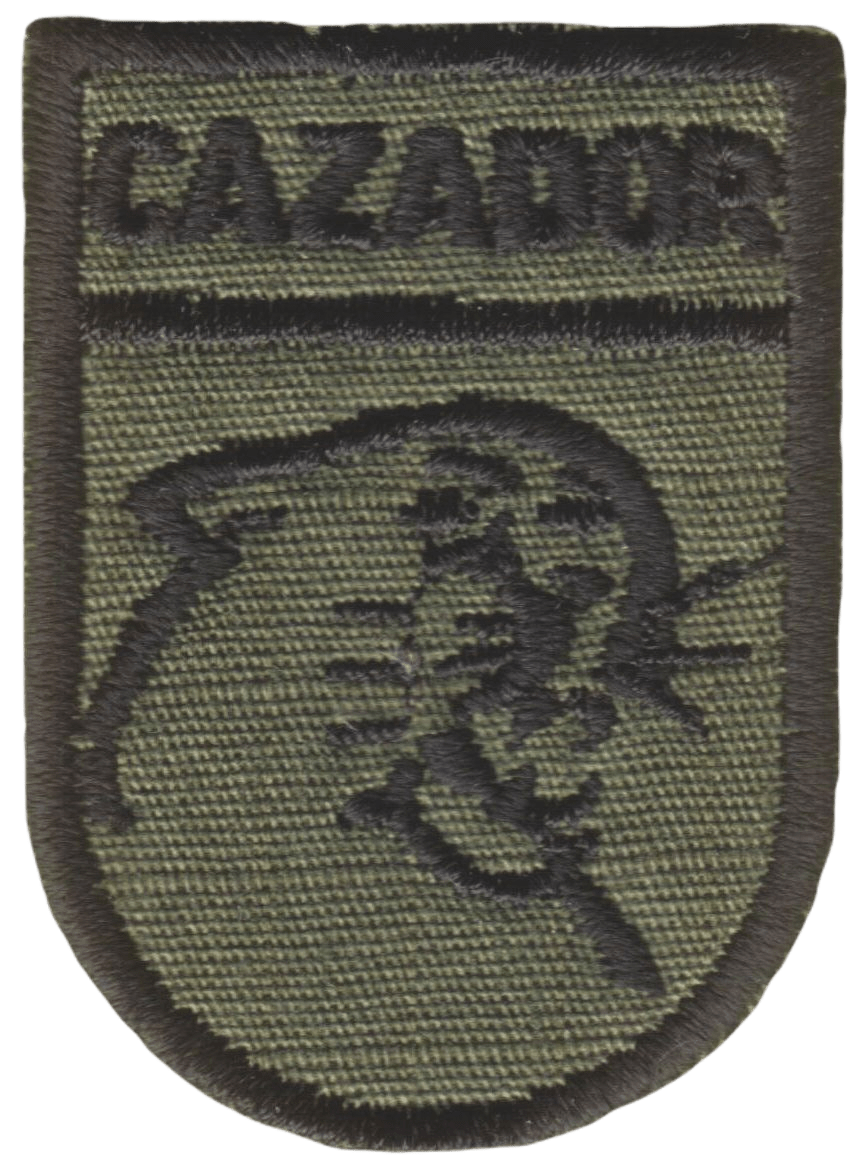

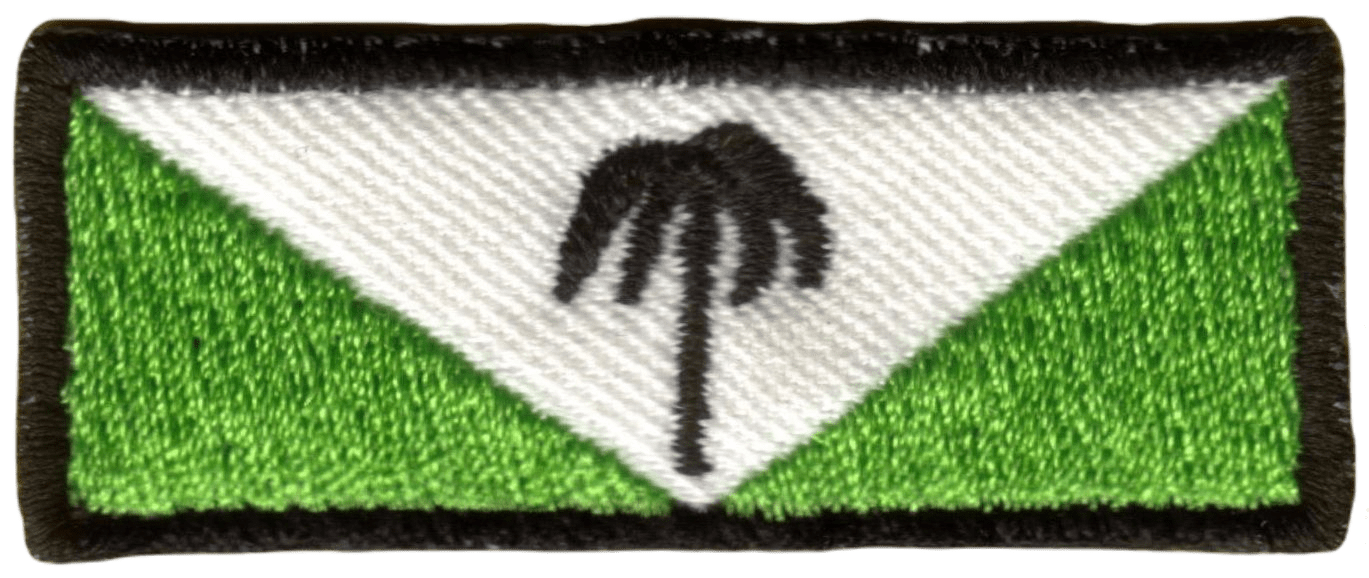

Cazadores de Monte should not be confused with the Cazadores de Montaña

Cazadores de Monte (Spanish for Jungle Huntsmen) are special jungle warfare troops of the Argentine Army.

== Units ==
As of December 2013, there are four Jungle Huntsmen units:

- 12th Jungle Cazadores Company (Compañía de Cazadores de Monte 12), based at Puerto Iguazú, Misiones
- 17th Jungle Cazadores Company (Compañía de Cazadores de Monte 17), based at Tartagal, Salta
- 18th Jungle Cazadores Company (Compañía de Cazadores de Monte 18), based at Bernardo de Irigoyen, Misiones
- 19th Jungle Cazadores Company (Compañía de Cazadores de Monte 19), based at Formosa city, Formosa

== See also ==
12th Bush Brigade
