= Zapala Department =

Coordinates: 38°54′10″S 70°03′53″W

Zapala
- Department
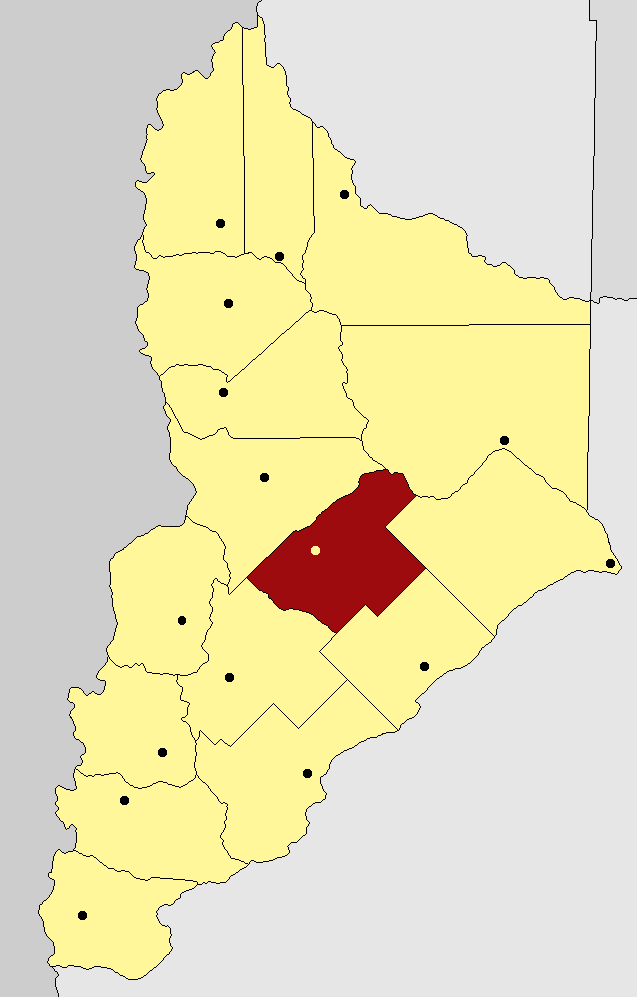
- Country: Argentina
- Province: Neuquén
- Capital: Zapala

Area
  - Total: 5,200 km^{2} (2,000 sq mi)

Population (2022)
  - Total: 45,698
  - Density: 8.8/km^{2} (23/sq mi)
- Important cities: Zapala: Mariano Moreno; Villa del Puente Picún Leufú; Covunco Abajo; Covunco Centro; Los Catutos; Ramón M. Castro

Zapala is a department located in the center of Neuquén Province, Argentina.

== Geography ==
The Department limits with Confluencia Department at the East, Añelo Department at the northeast, Picún Leufú Department at southeast, Catán Lil Department at southwest and Picunches Department at northwest.
