= 601st Engineer Grouping (Argentina) =

Argentine military unit

601 Engineer Grouping
- Agrupación de Comunicaciones 601
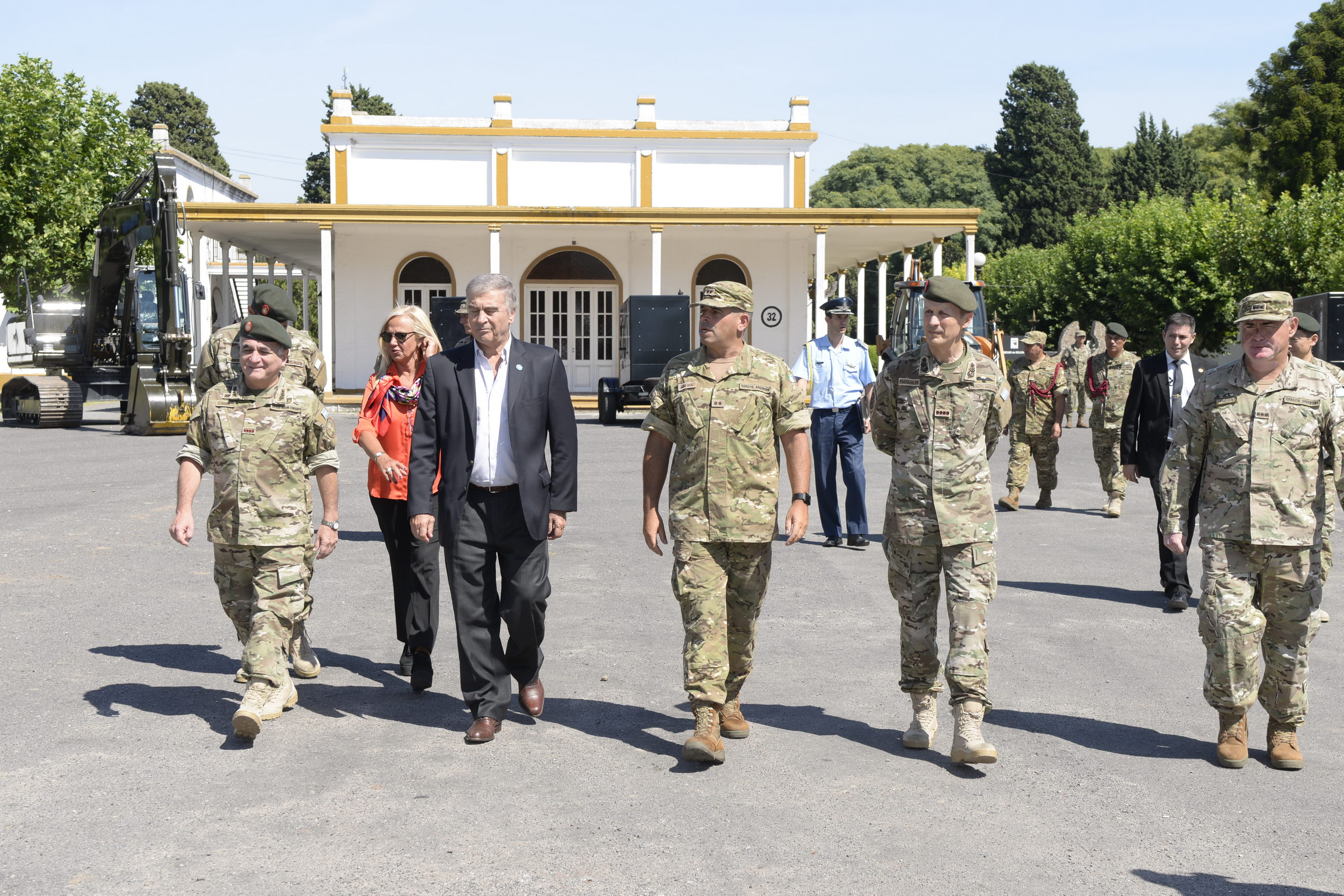
- The Minister of Defense Oscar Aguad at the 601st. Engineer Grouping in Campo de Mayo, Feb 2019
- Country: Argentina
- Branch: Argentine Army
- Type: Engineer grouping
- Part of: Army Enlistment and Training Command
- Garrison/HQ: Campo de Mayo Army Garrison

The 601 Engineer Grouping (Agr Ing 601) is an Argentine Army Engineer grouping. It is based at Campo de Mayo Army Garrison.

== Structure ==
- 601 Engineer Grouping Headquarters. Campo de Mayo Army Garrison.
  - 601 Engineer Battalion. Campo de Mayo Army Garrison.
  - 601 CBRN and Emergency Support Company. San Nicolás de los Arroyos Barracks.
  - 601 Facilities Maintenance Engineer Company. Villa Martelli Army Garrison.
  - 601 Army Divers Engineer Company. Villa Martelli Army Garrison.
  - 601 Transport Engineer Company. Campo de Mayo Army Garrison.
  - 601 Water Engineer Company. Campo de Mayo Army Garrison.

== Humanitarian aids ==
In 2019, the Ministry of Defense supplied the 601 Engineer Grouping with heavy equipment, water treatment plants, pneumatic machines and tools, New Holland D-180C bulldozers, Komatsu WA-320 front loaders, Case 580-W backhoe loaders, GEFCO drills and Sany STC-800 cranes. Argentine Army's Engineer Branch personnel manufactured a water purification and bagging plant. It has a capacity of 6000 L by micro filtration or 3000 by reverse osmosis, and can pack 1200 sachets of water per hour.

In 2019, 601 Engineer Grouping elements deployed at Santa Cruz de la Sierra y Concepción, Bolivia, in order to provide logistical support to the fight against Amazon rainforest wildfires. The movement was carried out in coordination with units of the Navy of the Argentine Republic. Personnel and equipment of the Grouping with its Headquarters and Staff joined the mission, in addition to the 601st Water Engineer Company. Also operators of road machinery of the 601st Engineer Battalion. An approximate number of 200 troops was totaled.
