= 12th Jungle Cazadores Company =

- Compañía de Cazadores de Monte 12
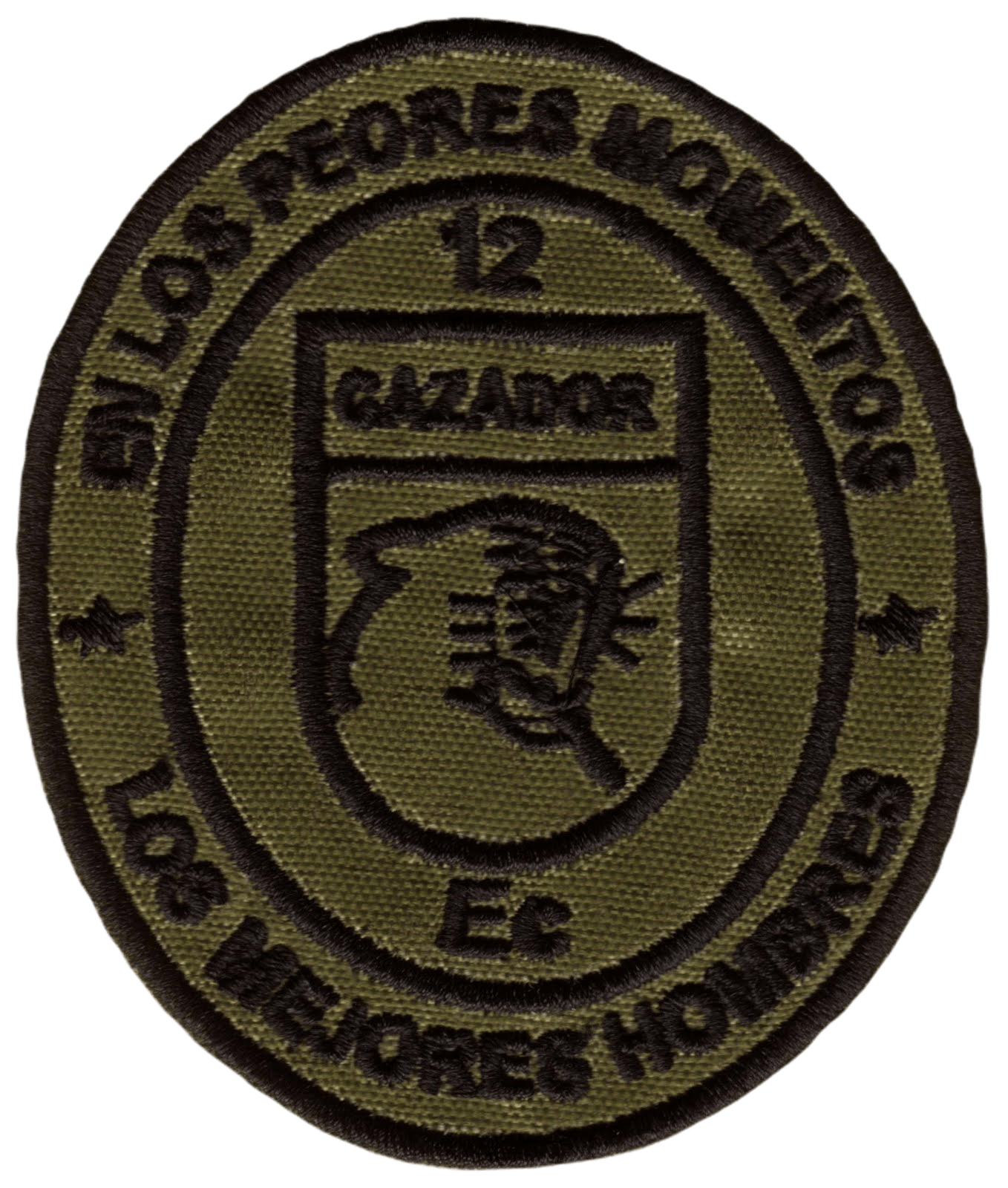
- Shoulder patch of the 12th Jungle Cazadores Company
- Country: Argentina
- Branch: Argentine Army
- Type: Infantry
- Role: Jungle warfare
- Size: Company
- Part of: XII Bush Brigade
- Garrison/HQ: Puerto Iguazú, Misiones

The 12th Jungle Cazadores Company (Spanish: Compañía de Cazadores de Monte 12) is a light infantry unit of the Argentine Army (EA) specialized in combat patrol in mountain forest terrain, counterinsurgency, and jungle warfare. This company is part of the 12th Bush Brigade, and is based in Puerto Iguazú, province of Misiones.

== See also ==
- Jungle warfare
- Cazadores de Monte
