= Ramón M. Castro =

- Municipality and village
- Location within Neuquén Province Location within Argentina
- Coordinates: 38°51′S 69°45′W
- Country: Argentina
- Province: Neuquén Province

Population (2010)
  - Total: 317
- Time zone: UTC-−3 (ART)

Ramón M. Castro is a village and municipality in the Zapala Department, Neuquén Province in southwestern Argentina. It has a population of 317.

== History ==
The settlement of the territory of Ramón M. Castro was carried out through different historical processes. In early times the first occupations were led by indigenous populations: Mapuche groups. Following this, nomadic farmers integrated into the land, trading with the herding and sale of cattle, salt and other merchandise. In turn, pioneer settlers and European immigrant families, mainly of Basque origin, participated in this process, carrying out work, commercial and professional activities.

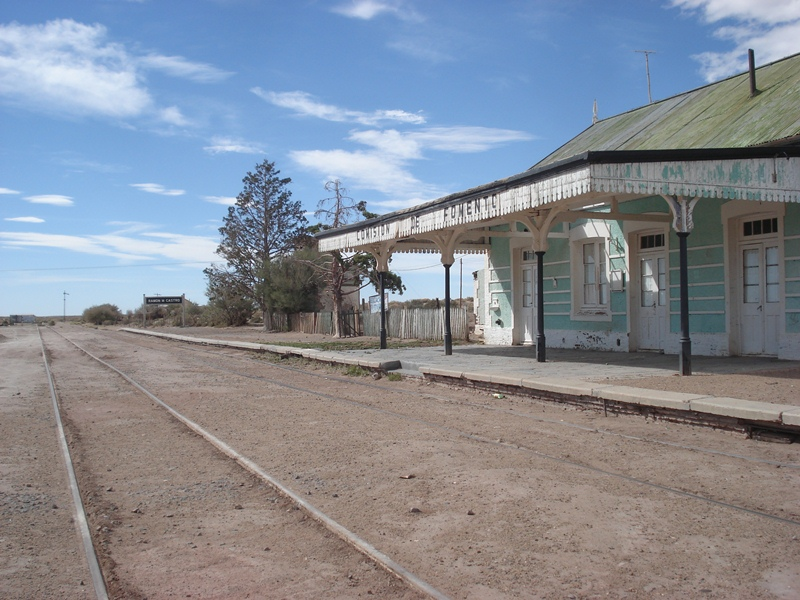
The Railway Station of Ramón M. Castro

The great availability of land and the proximity to Chile resulted in a migratory process. These new inhabitants were located in the large fiscal areas, laying the foundations for a rural and pastoral life with nomadic activity. This occupation was accentuated in the mid-19th century. At that time, the population grew after the incorporation of the territory of the Province of Neuquén to the agro-export model and the arrival of the General Roca Railway. In the second half of the 19th century, the consolidation of the State – Nation reorganized spatial distribution through: military campaigns; settlement of military units in strategic places to reinforce the borders with Chile, and the inclusion of national territories through Law 15321.

In this same period, the engineer Ramón Castro donated the land for the construction of the station, currently the Comisión de Fomento. It was inaugurated on October 21, 1937 under the name of Ramón M. Castro. In this case, the expansion of railway communications was carried out by the General Roca Railway company.

The existence of a railway station in the jurisdiction intensified the exploitation of natural resources. The clay soil and railway transportation created the necessary conditions to generate sources of work around the manufacture of bricks and hollow ceramics, and their sale in different geographical locations.

In that period there were two brick ovens in the center of the town. In the area of Anticlinal, belonging to Ramón M. Castro, the largest amount of clay was found; Its population exploited the resource and transported the products to the town. In this way, the manufacture of bricks and ceramics employed residents from different parts of the town.

The largest percentage of the population worked in the railway company, as technicians, machinists, and warehouse workers. The first groups that settled in the area adapted to nomadic work, organizing themselves around livestock farming. They moved their animals from the low, arid "winter" fields to the high valleys of the mountain "veranadas".

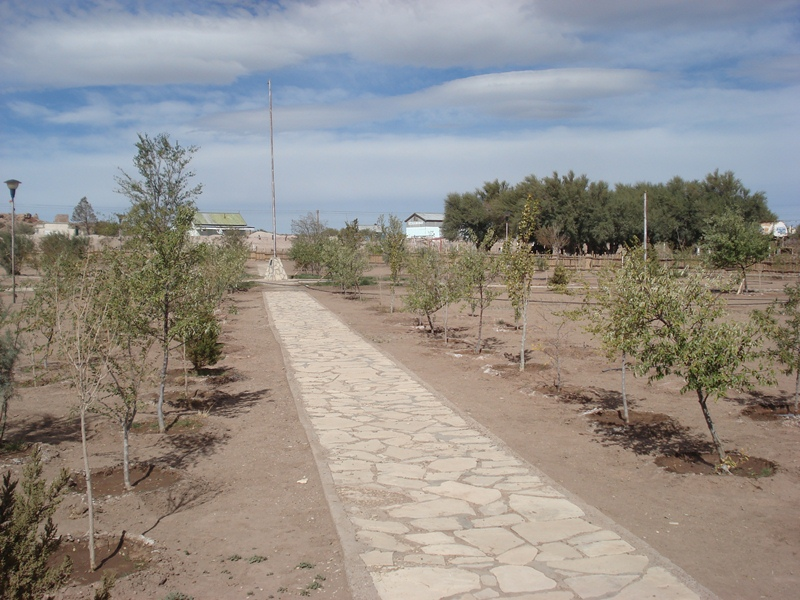
Central plaza of Ramón M. Castro

Ramón M. Castro in its heyday had 1,000 inhabitants distributed throughout the jurisdiction. In 2010 its population has been reduced by half with approximately 555 inhabitants between the center of Ramón Castro and its six areas.

Ramón Castro is a jurisdiction made up of different parajes, small roadside inhabited places; Santo Domingo, Barda Negra and Anticlinal. Marked distinctions are recorded between communities composed of descendants of Mapuches and the rest of the inhabitants of the places. In Santo Domingo we found the indigenous Ñaly Ko community made up of 35 families; In Barda Negra is the Calfucurá community, where approximately 18 families live, and in other places lives the Antipán community made up of 16 families.

There are provincial festivals in Zapala where residents from different places participate, there are also numerous festivals organized by the evangelical church. Evangelism has deeply penetrated the customs of many of the area's inhabitants; some comment that, thanks to them, alcoholic beverages have stopped at festivals.
