= Los Catutos =

- Municipality and village
- Location within Neuquén Province Location within Argentina
- Coordinates: 38°50′12″S 70°11′53″W
- Country: Argentina
- Province: Neuquén Province
- Department: Zapala Department
- Founded: 1997

Government
  - Mayor: Sergio Quinchao

Population (2010)
  - Total: 229
- Time zone: UTC−3 (ART)
- CPA base: Q8351
- Area code: +54 2942
- Climate: Csb

Los Catutos is a village and municipality in Neuquén Province in southwestern Argentina. It is located in the center of the province, 20 km from the department capital, Zapala.

== History ==
Before it became a municipality, Los Catutos started as a mining town in 1954. Since then until the 1990s, the town's economy was based on the extraction of limestone and flagstone. In 1986, the last mining company closed down, but shortly after it re-opened. The municipality was created on August 15, 1997, comprising the area of Los Catutos and the nearby villages Laguna Miranda and El Ministerio.

== Population ==
According to the 1991 census, a total of 214 people lived in town. From 1991 to 2001, the population increased to 281 inhabitants. At the time of the Argentine census of 2010, 229 people inhabited the area of Los Catutos.

After the local quicklime factory closed down in the 1990s, many locals moved away to nearby municipalities, looking for similar jobs.
