= Argentine Army Aviation =

- Comando de Aviación de Ejército
- Argentine Army Aviation wings
- Active: 1912 – 1945; 1956 - present
- Country: Argentina
- Branch: Argentine Army
- Type: Army aviation Command
- Part of: Army; Ministry of Defense; Army Enlistment and Training Command
- Command HQ: Campo de Mayo Military Airfield
- Engagements: Operativo Independencia; Falklands War (Spanish: Guerra de las Malvinas)

Commanders
- Commander-in-Chief: President
- Chief of Staff of the Army: General
- Chief of AvEjer: Colonel

Insignia
- Roundel

Aircraft flown
- Cargo helicopter: Aérospatiale SA 332B Super Puma
- Multirole helicopter: Bell UH-1H Iroquois
- Transport: CASA C-212-200 Aviocar, Cessna 208B Grand Caravan, Cessna 208B Grand Caravan EX
- North American Sabreliner 75A, Cessna 550B Citation Bravo II

The Argentine Army Aviation (Spanish: Comando de Aviación de Ejército, AvEj) is the army aviation branch of the Argentine Army. Their members have the same rank insignia and titles as the rest of the Army. The Army Aviation Command is based at the Campo de Mayo Military Airfield.

Alongside its primary role of supporting Army operations, the Army Aviation is highly involved in humanitarian aid missions, emergency relief, medical evacuations and forest firefighting.

== History ==
Military aviation in Argentina can be traced back to the Paraguayan War when, on 8 July 1867, Staff Sergeant Roberto A. Chodasiewicz used an observation balloon during the battle of Humaitá. Since then, the army has been the main driving force behind the national aeronautical development. The use of enthusiastic students who relied on the selfless support of civil institutions and air clubs, saw the creation of the Military Aviation School at El Palomar in 1912.

The establishment of the Army Aviation Service (in Spanish, Servicio de Aviación del Ejército) saw a great expansion of Argentine air power in the 1912–1945 period, and supported the development of civil aviation in Argentina. The creation of the first aviation units and the foundation of the Fábrica Militar de Aviones in the 1920s were the beginning of a process that lead to the creation of the Argentine Air Force in 1945, to which the Army transferred its aircraft and related installations.

=== Re-establishment ===
In 1956, Army Aviation was re-established within the Army and began a major expansion, incorporating new types of aircraft and opening new bases around the country. In 1965, using a Cessna U-17 they performed their first expedition to the South Pole.

During the 1970s the service consolidated itself as an important branch of the Army receiving aircraft such as the Aeritalia G.222 transport which caused friction with the Argentine Air Force. The expansion plans continued in the early 1980s with the incorporation of the Agusta A109 utility and the Boeing CH-47 Chinook heavy-lift helicopters.

The dictatorship that took power in 1976 increased tensions with Chile which reached their highest point during the 1978 Operation Soberanía where the Army Aviation performed major deployments.

=== Falklands War ===
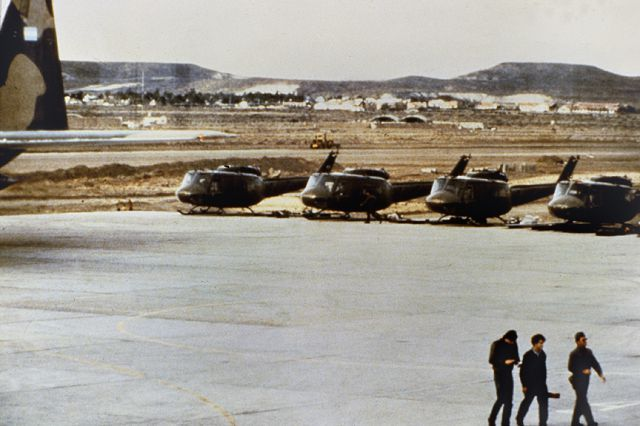
UH-1H Iroquois "Huey" helicopters, at Port Stanley Airport; after transport to the islands by C-130H "Hercules"; rotors not yet reattached

In 1982, the Military Junta invaded the Falkland Islands (Spanish: Islas Malvinas) triggering a ten-week-long war against the United Kingdom. The Argentine Army Aviation deployed 2 CH-47 Chinooks, 3 Agusta A109, 6 SA330 Pumas and 9 UH-1Hs to the islands, where they performed 796 general support flights under harsh operating conditions. Their helicopters were also extensively used in Patagonia and the Army also took over the provincial police's MBB Bo 105s during the conflict.

Six Army aviation members died in the war. Two army helicopters were shot down, six destroyed on the ground, and ten were captured. Some of these captured were used by British Army and other used as targets for RAF ground attack training.

=== Present Day ===
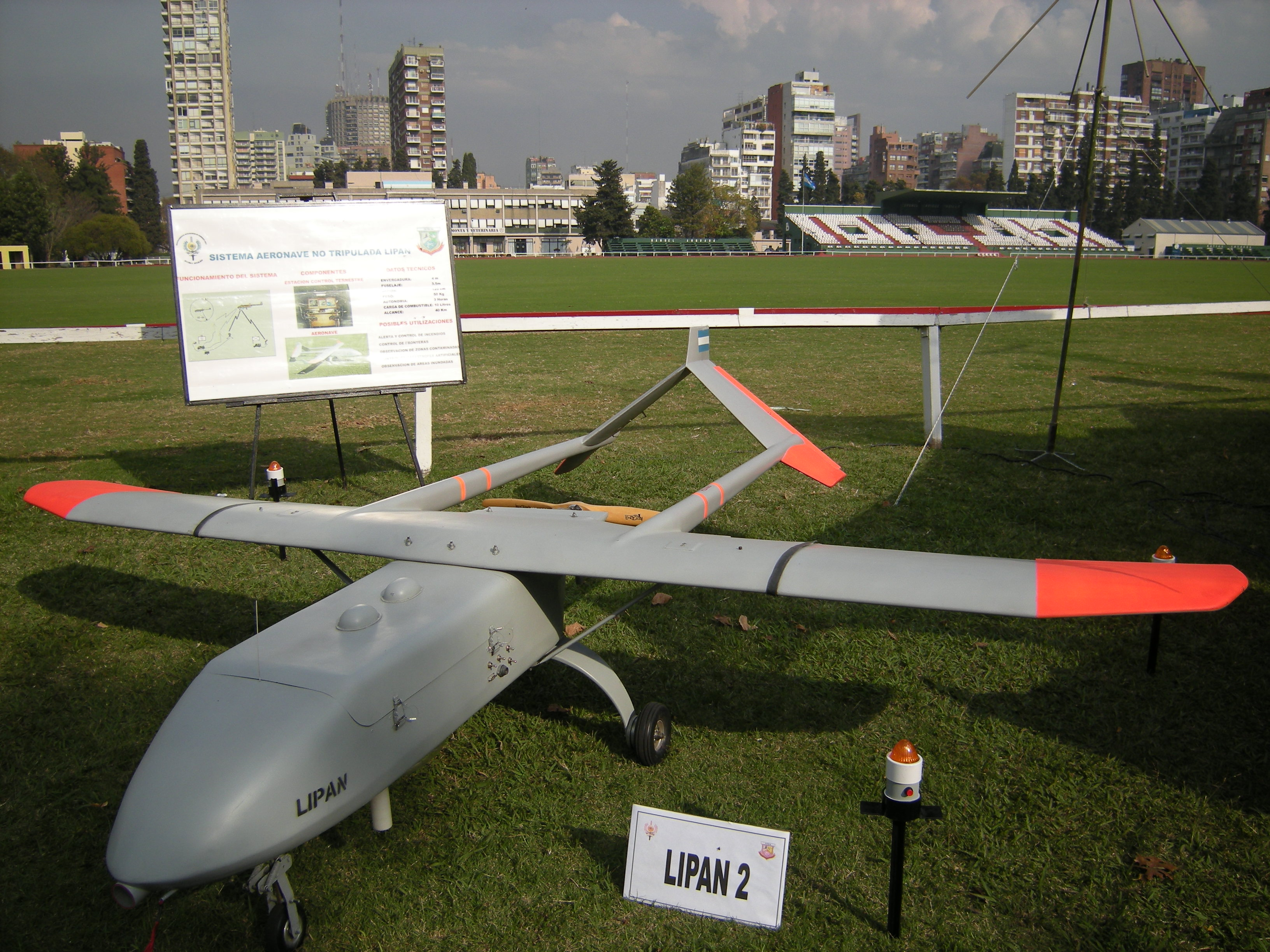
UAV Lipan Indigenous design

After the war, the Aerospatiale Super Puma was incorporated, mainly for Antarctica support duties operating from Navy's icebreaker ARA Almirante Irizar. In 1998, Argentina was granted Major Non-NATO ally status by United States President Bill Clinton and the Army Aviation began an expansive program that included the reception of OV-1 Mohawks and surplus UH-1H from the US Army. The US also authorized the delivery of 12 AH-1F Cobra gunships but the operation was halted by the Argentine Government.

In the 1990s, the Aviation Army began its Unmanned aerial vehicle program, the Lipan series.^{picture} In 2007, the Ministry of Defense evaluated the Chinese Changhe Z-11 (Argentine index AE-350) and 40 are to be built. Also in 2007, the Army unveiled the indigenous Cicaré CH-14 Aguilucho scout prototype ^{video}. A major update program is currently underway refitting the Hueys to the Huey II variant. In March 2010 it was announced the purchase of five Bell 206 for the Joint armed forces school.

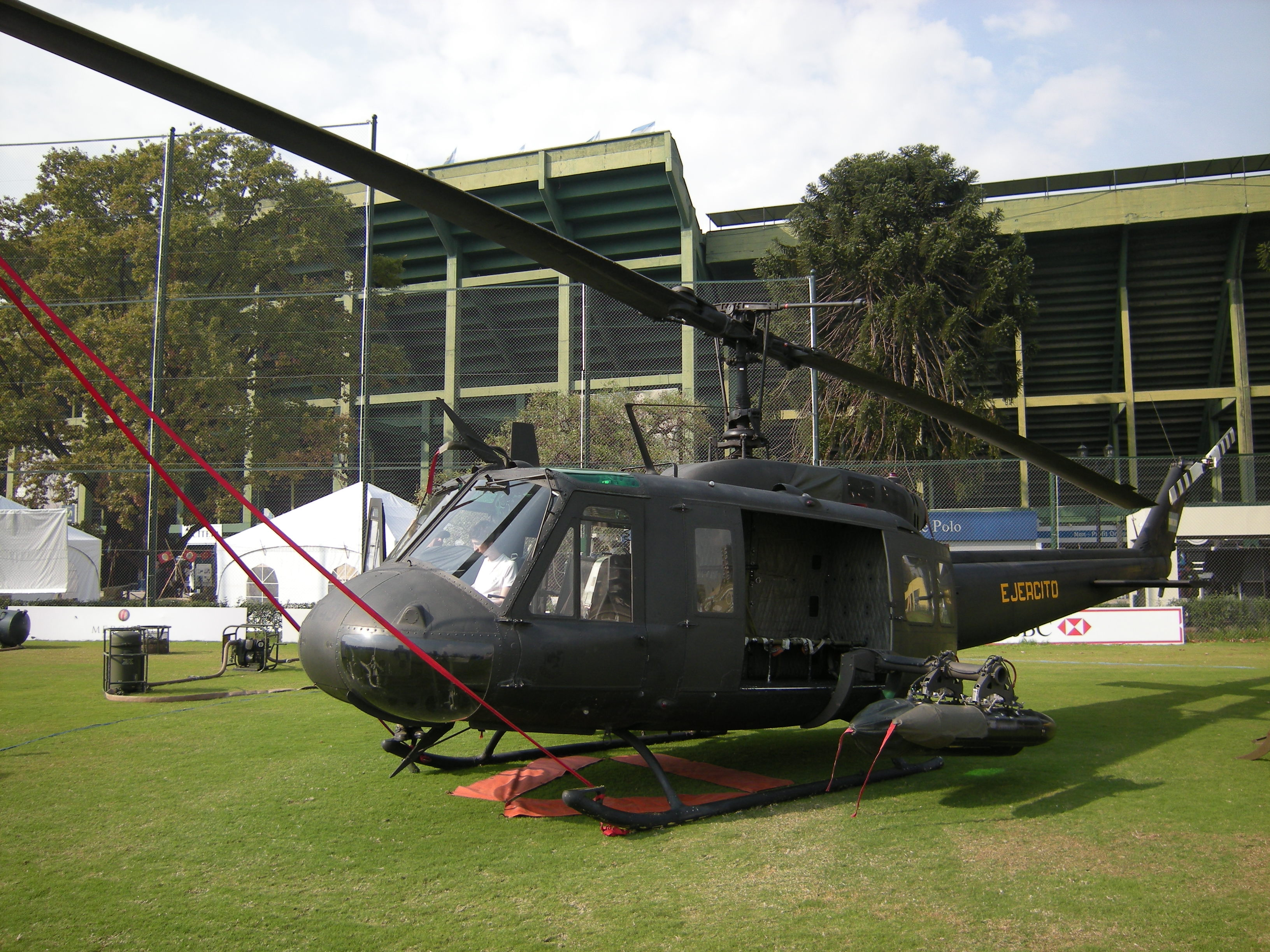
Bell UH-1H Huey during the Exhibition of the Argentine Army in May 2008

Army aircraft with tactical camouflage have adopted high-visibility yellow markings Ejército (Spanish for “Army”) in order to encourage the national press to stop referring to them as belonging to the air force.

In the 2014 celebration of the Argentine Army Aviation day, the following actions to improve capabilities were confirmed:

- purchase of 1 Cessna Citation and 4 Grand Caravan aircraft
- purchase of 2 CASA C-212 aircraft
- replacement of Mohawk by Diamond 42 aircraft
- purchase of second hand Italian AB206 helicopters (agreement reached but never signed until new government took power in 2016)
- upgrade of remaining UH-1 helicopters to Huey II standard (due to budget restrictions purchase of new helicopters was abandoned).
- refurbishing of Super Puma helicopters.

Currently, Argentina has expressed interest in buying surplus US equipment and authorization granted by US government. This may involve transport or scout helicopters.

The Army Aviation Command was renamed as “Army Aviation Directorate” (Dirección de Aviación de Ejército). Eight years later recovered its previous name, while going to depend of the Army Enlistment and Training Command.

== Organisation ==
=== Organizational structure ===
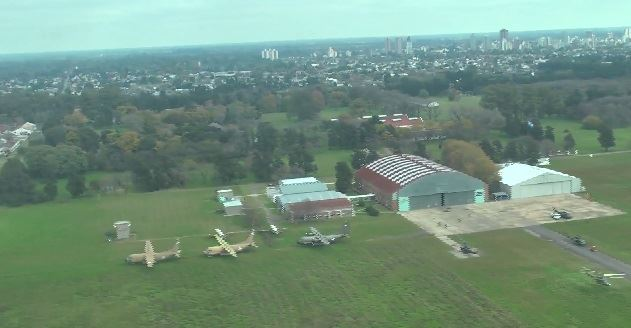
The Campo de Mayo airbase, the 3 Aeritalia G.222s can be seen in front of the hangars

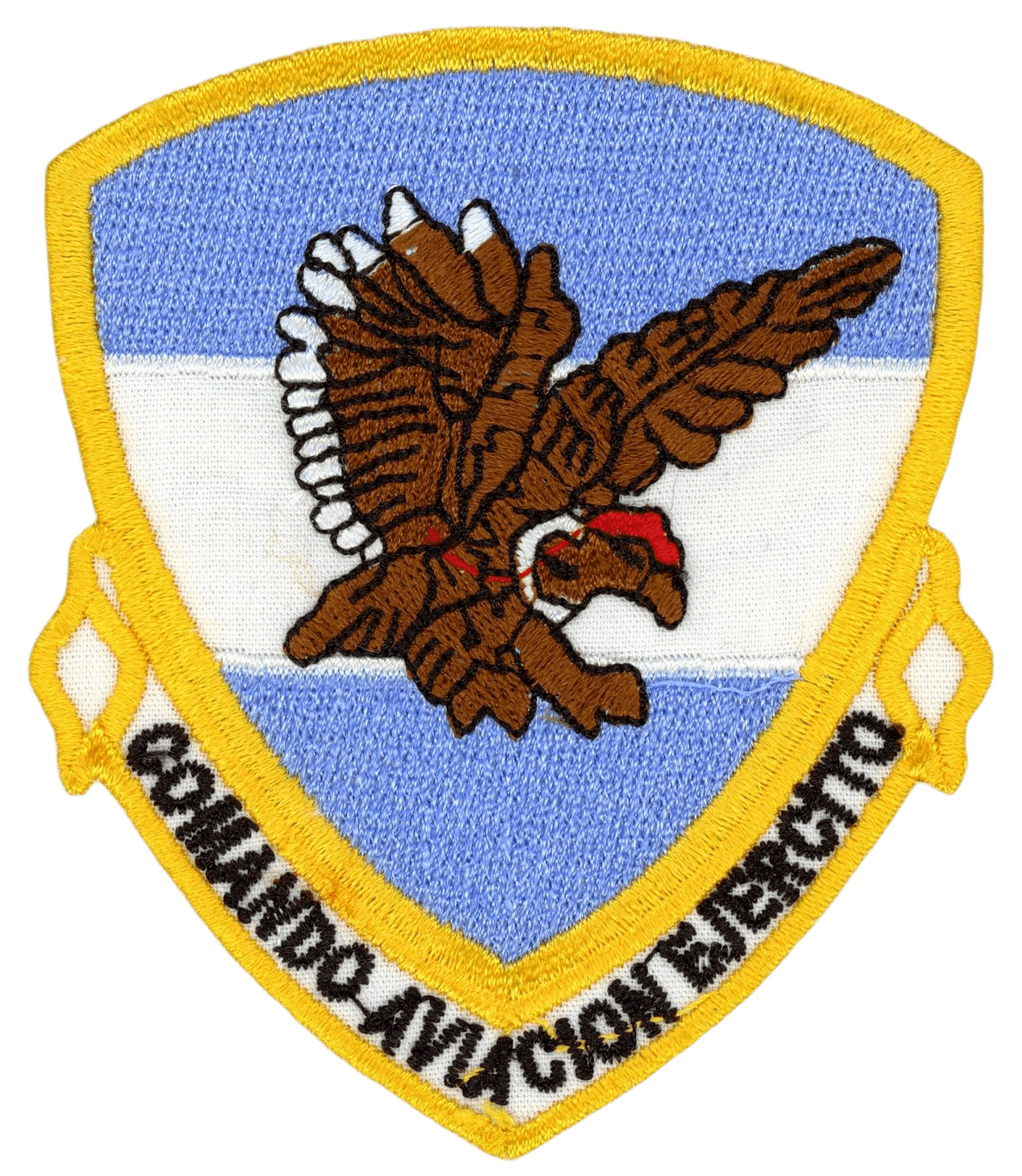
Argentine Army Aviation Command badge

The main airbase is located at Campo de Mayo where training and maintenance is done. The units based there are as follows:

- Army Aviation Group 601
  - 601st Assault Helicopter Battalion
  - 601st Aviation Supply and Maintenance Battalion
  - 601st Intelligence Support Aviation Squadron
  - 601st Combat Support Aviation Battalion
  - 602nd Attack/Scout Aviation Squadron
  - 603rd General Support Aviation Squadron
  - 604th Support Aviation Squadron

The service has also permanent forward location bases assigned to both division and brigade HQ levels.

- 1st Army Division
  - 121st Army Aviation Section (Rosario)
  - 2nd Army Aviation Section (Paraná)
  - 12th Army Aviation Section (Posadas)
- 2nd Army Division
  - 141st Army Aviation Section (Córdoba)
  - 6th Army Aviation Section (Neuquén)
  - 8th Army Aviation Section (Mendoza)
- 3rd Army Division
  - 181st Army Aviation Section (Bahía Blanca)
  - 9th Army Aviation Section (Comodoro Rivadavia)
  - 11th Army Aviation Section (Río Gallegos)

=== Pilot recruitment and training ===
The Argentine Army gets its pilots from two main sources. One is the officers who graduate from the Military College and then volunteer for the Army Aviator Course. This course lasts one year and takes place at either the Air Force Academy, in Córdoba (for fixed wing aircraft), or the Army Aviation School (for helicopters), in Campo de Mayo, outside Buenos Aires. Since 2009, these two schools are the only training centers for pilots from the three armed services. The other source is civilian pilots who, after a ten-month course at the Military Academy, join the Army Aviation as 2nd lieutenants.

While College-graduated officers are called “Army Aviators” and those coming from civilian life are “Army Pilots”, there are no specific technical differences between them. However, “Army Pilots” can only reach the rank of colonel. Also, “Army Aviators” retain their original branch (i.e. Infantry, Cavalry, Artillery, Engineers, Signals or Ordnance) and can be posted to their branch's units in case of need. “Army Pilots”, instead, can only serve in Army Aviation units or related positions, as they have no other capability.

== Aircraft inventory ==
The Argentine Army Aviation current inventory includes the following aircraft.

Aircraft	Origin	Type	Variant	In service	Notes
Helicopters
Bell UH-1	United States	Utility helicopter	UH-1H	50	
Aérospatiale SA315	France	Liaison aircraft		2	
Bell 407 helicopter	United States/Canada	Utility	GXi	2	1 on order. Replacing SA 315B Lama
Eurocopter AS332B	France	Transport helicopters		1	
Agusta-Bell 206	Italy	Utility helicopter	AB-206B1	7	Modernisation by FAdeA and Leonardo S.p.A.
Sikorsky UH-60 Black Hawk	United States	Military helicopter	L		4 on order with option for 16 more. Will be stationed at 601st Assault Helicopter Battalion.
Transport
CASA C-212	Spain	Transport aircraft / medevac		3	
Cessna 208 Caravan	United States	Transport aircraft		4	
DHC-6 Twin Otter	Canada	Utility transport		2	STOL capable aircraft
Beechcraft Baron	United States	Transport		1	
Cessna Citation II	United States	VIP	Bravo	1	
Reconnaissance
Diamond DA62	Austria	Surveillance		1	
Trainer aircraft
Bell 206	United States	Trainer		5	

== See also ==
- Argentine air forces in the Falklands War
- Argentine Air Force
- Argentine Naval Aviation
- Equipment of the Argentine Army
