= 6th Mountain Cazadores Company =

Argentine army company

The 6th Mountain Huntsmen Company (Spanish: Compañía de Cazadores de Montaña 6) is a mountain infantry unit of the Argentine Army (EA) that specialised in combat patrol in mountain forest terrain and mountain warfare. The Company is based at Primeros Pinos, Neuquén Province. This unit is part of the 6th Mountain Infantry Brigade. The troops and soldiers of this unit wear a tan beret with unit insignia.

== See also ==
- Mountain warfare
- 6th Mountain Infantry Brigade
- Cazadores de Montaña
