= Operation Soberanía =

Planned Argentine military invasion of Chile

Operación Soberanía (Operation Sovereignty) was a planned Argentine military invasion of territory disputed with Chile, and ultimately possibly of Chile itself, due to the Beagle conflict. The invasion was initiated on 22 December 1978 but was halted after a few hours and Argentine forces retreated from the conflict zone without a fight. Whether the Argentine infantry actually crossed the border into Chile has not been established. Argentine sources insist that they crossed the border.

In 1971, Chile and Argentina had agreed to binding arbitration by an international tribunal, under the auspices of the British Government, to settle the boundary dispute. On 22 May 1977 the British Government announced the decision, which awarded the Picton, Nueva and Lennox islands to Chile.

On 25 January 1978 Argentina rejected the decision and attempted to militarily coerce Chile into negotiating a division of the islands that would produce a boundary consistent with Argentine claims.

== Date, objective and name of the operation ==
According to Argentine sources, after the Argentine repudiation of the arbitration award in January 1978, the invasion plans were given different names depending on the planning level and phase. Also, the targets of the invasion changed according to the political situation and to information about the Chilean defense: the target being first only the Picton, Nueva and Lennox islands, then the "little" Evout, Hoorn, Deceit and Barnevelt islands, then both groups of islands. Finally, on Friday 15 December 1978 Argentina's President Jorge Videla signed the order to invade on 21 December 1978 at 04:30 as the beginning of the invasion, but it was postponed to the next day because of the bad weather conditions in the landing zone.

== Military imbalance ==
At the time of the crisis, the Argentine military was substantially larger than that of Chile; in addition, the Chilean regime was more politically isolated and had suffered deteriorating relations with its main suppliers of arms. The Chilean military, however, had the advantage of defending difficult terrain, as well as being a more professional force, while decades of intervention by the Argentine armed forces in day-to-day politics had degraded their professional skills.

There was considerable international condemnation of the Chilean regime's human rights record, with the United States expressing particular concern after Orlando Letelier's 1976 assassination in Washington D.C., though the U.S. had helped to install the Pinochet administration initially. The United States banned the export of weapons to Chile through the Kennedy Amendment, later International Security Assistance and Arms Export Control Act of 1976. 16 Northrop F-5's were delivered to Chile before the embargo took effect, but they arrived without any armament. In 1980 Chile was excluded from UNITAS joint naval maneuvers because of human rights violations. Germany, Austria and the United Kingdom the traditional supplier of the Chilean Armed Forces, did not supply weapons to Chile.

In 1974, the Argentine Navy commissioned two modern Type 209 submarines, Salta and San Luis, complementing two older GUPPY submarines, Santa Fe and Santiago del Estero.

In 1978, the United States extended the Kennedy amendment to Argentina as well because of its human rights record, which led to the Armed Forces purchases shifting to Europe: France, Germany, and Austria exported weapons to Argentina even during the critical phase of the Beagle conflict, as Argentina had already rejected the international binding Arbitral Award. In December 1978, when the outbreak of war appeared unavoidable, the German shipbuilders Blohm + Voss agreed to build four destroyers for the Argentine Junta. In November 1978 France delivered two corvettes, Good Hope and Transvaal, to Argentina, originally built for the apartheid regime in South Africa, but undeliverable because of anti-apartheid embargoes; in Argentina they were renamed Drummond and Guerrico. United States President Ronald Reagan (1981–1989) later improved relations with Argentina in recognition of their military support for Nicaragua's Contras. (See Operation Charly).

The United Kingdom delivered Type 42 destroyers to the Argentine junta. On 19 September 1977 Hércules (built and completed in the UK) sailed to Argentina from the Vickers Shipbuilding yard in Barrow-in-Furness; on 28 November 1981 Santísima Trinidad (built in Argentina, completed in the UK) sailed from Portsmouth.

An overview of both countries' defense spending:

	1976	1977	1978	1979	1980	1981
Chile
defense spending*	487	566	713	951	1,128	949
percentage of the GNP	3.5	3.5	4.1	4.6	5.2	
Argentina
defense spending*	2,702	2,225	2,339	2,641	2,126	2,241
percentage of the GNP	2.2	2.0	2.3	2.5	2.0	

* Costs in millions of 1979 US dollars.

The Argentines' numerical advantage was counterbalanced by the following factors:

- Defense is less risky than attack
- Chile spent a higher portion of its gross domestic product on defense
- The politicization of the Argentine armed forces diminished their military readiness
- The Andes mountain range is a difficult natural barrier and the geography of the Tierra del Fuego provided advantages to Chilean naval forces in the immediate operational theatre

The Ambassador of the United States in Argentina (1978) Raúl Castro described the attitude of the Argentine military towards a possible war with the following:

They supposed that they were going to invade Chile, Santiago especially. It seemed to them something very easy; Just a matter of crossing the border and that the Chileans were going to surrender right away. And I told them: No, no, you are mistaken. They have a better Navy than yours. They are well armed, and are very strong.

== Argentine plan ==
No Argentine official documents or statements concerning the planning of the war of aggression against Chile have been released. But there have been so many individual accounts from the Argentine ranks that the existence of a plan has not been disputed.

The Argentine Government planned to first occupy the islands around Cape Horn and then, in a second phase, either to stop or continue hostilities according to the Chilean reaction. Argentina had already drafted a declaration of war. An Argentine complaint in the UN Security Council over Chile's military occupation of the disputed islands was to precede the attack.

Rubén Madrid Murúa in "La Estrategia Nacional y Militar que planificó Argentina, en el marco de una estrategia total, para enfrentar el conflicto con Chile el año 1978", ("Memorial del Ejército de Chile", Edición Nº 471, Santiago, Chile, 2003, S. 54-55), stated that the Argentine General Staff planned the operation under the name "Planeamiento Conjunto de Operaciones Previstas contra Chile".

The Argentines planned amphibious landings to seize the islands southwards of the Beagle Channel, along with massive land-based attacks:

1. at 20:00 on 22 December 1978 a task force of the Argentine Navy and the Argentine Marines ( Batallón N° 5 ) under the command of Humberto José Barbuzzi would seize the islands Horn, Freycinet, Hershell, Deceit and Wollaston.
2. at 22:00 on 22 December 1978 the Argentine task force (with Naval Infantry Battalions N° 3 and N° 4) would seize Picton, Nueva and Lennox islands and secure for the navy the east mouth of the Beagle Channel.
3. at 24:00 on 22 December 1978 the invasion of continental Chile would begin. The Fifth Army Corps under command of José Antonio Vaquero would seize Punta Arenas and Puerto Natales, the largest two cities of the Chilean Magallanes Region.
4. at daylight 23 December 1978 the Argentine Air Force would begin attacks against Chilean Air Force.
5. Later, Third Army Corps under the command of Luciano Benjamín Menéndez would start an offensive through the Andean passes of "Libertadores", "Maipo" and "Puyehue" (today Cardenal Samore Pass) to seize Santiago, Valparaíso and the Los Lagos Region.

Resources and mission of Argentine Forces for the phases 1 and 2 according to Alberto Gianola Otamendi
	GT 42.1	GT 42.2	GT 42.3	V Army Corps
Mission	Naval interdiction of the Beagle Channel; Fire-support for landing	Defense of Ushuaia; Landing in the islands	Support and base for helos; Landing of BIM sect. in the islands; Fire support for landing	Defense north of Lago Fagano
Resources	Men: Buzos Tácticos; Grupo de Minado; Destacamento Naval de Playas; Ships: Agrupación de Lanchas Rápidas; Airplanes: 12 SA 316 B Alouette III (ARA)	Men: BIM N°4: Cía. Kaiken IM; Cía.Jaguar IM; Cía. Leopardo EA; Sec. anfibious vehicle (VAR); Ships: -; Airplanes: 3 Sea King ARA; 1 Puma EA; 7 Sikorsky FAA; T28, T34 and Aermacchi MB 326	Men: section of BIM N°4 on board; Ships: ARA Belgrano; ARA 25 de Mayo (+24 Skyhawk); 3 Corvettes; 9 destroyers; Airplanes: 12 Skyhawk A4Q; 3 Grumman S2A / S2E; 3 heli Sea King; Beechcraft B200	Men: V Army Corps; BIM N°5 in Río Grande; Ships: -; Airplanes: -

The Second Army Corps under the command of Leopoldo Galtieri would protect the north of Argentina from a potential Brazilian attack and its II Brigada de Caballería blindada would protect the Argentine region of Río Mayo in Chubut Province from a possible Chilean attack.

The Argentine Armed Forces expected between 30,000 and 50,000 dead in the course of the war.

Argentina solicited a Peruvian attack in Chile's north, but Peru rejected this demand and ordered only a partial mobilization.

=== Plan for the time after the invasion ===
For the postwar phase of the operation, the Argentine Navy prepared political instructions to be followed in the southern zone after the disputed islands were under Argentinian sovereignty. They defined the new border, navigation rights for Chilean ships, instructions in case of confrontations with the Chilean Navy, dealing with injured personnel, prisoners of war, etc.

== Chilean preparedness ==
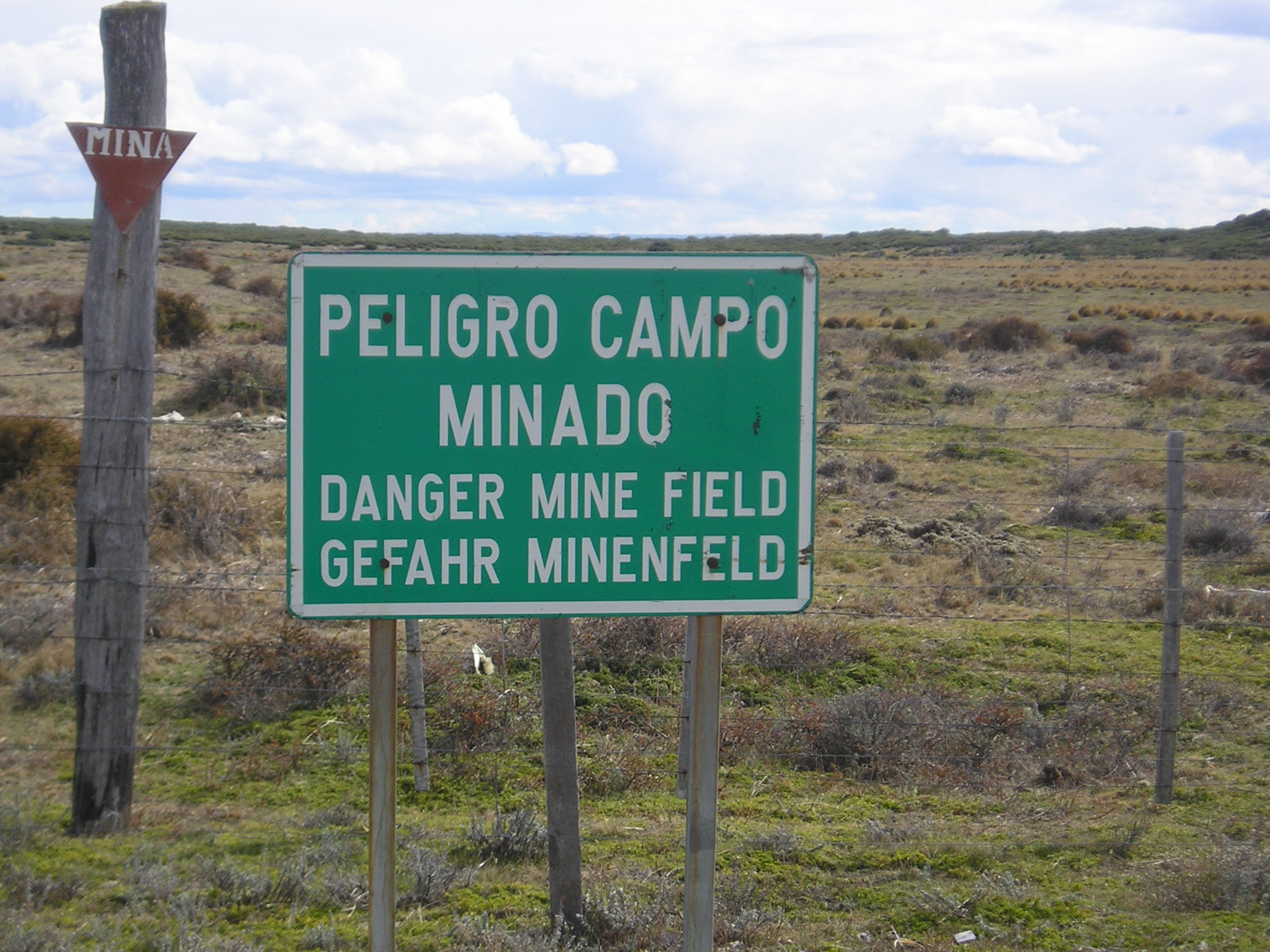
Mine field in Isla Grande de Tierra del Fuego Chile, photograph from 2006

There was no surprise factor, since the Chilean military kept movements of the Argentine fleet under surveillance and monitored the build-up of Argentine troops. Chilean troops were deployed along the border, ready to meet any invaders.

Chile planted mines in certain areas along its borders with Argentina, Bolivia and Peru and dynamited some mountain passes.

Parts of route 9-CH between Punta Arenas and Puerto Natales were selected to serve as extra airstrips in the case of an invasion. A defensive position was built up the narrowest part of Brunswick Peninsula to avoid or delay an Argentine capture of Punta Arenas. In contrast to the defensive war planned by the Chilean Army in Punta Arenas and Puerto Natales, the Chilean army had plans for an attack to invade the Argentine part of Tierra del Fuego, but control of the island of Tierra del Fuego was considered a secondary goal since its control was believed to depend on the outcome of the clash of the navies.

The combat-ready Chilean fleet sailed on 22 December 1978 from the fjords of Hoste Island to frustrate an Argentine landing. Rear Admiral Raúl López, Chief of the Chilean fleet, kept silent as to whether he would simply wait or initiate an attack on the enemy navy.

Chilean biochemist Eugenio Berríos is reported to have worked on a plan to poison the water supply of Buenos Aires in the event of war.

== Operation aborted ==
On D-day, a severe storm impeded Argentine operations in the disputed area. Meanwhile, Pope John Paul II, alarmed by the situation, decided to act personally and informed both governments that he was sending his personal envoy, Cardinal Antonio Samoré, to both capitals. Six hours before landing, the Argentine fleet turned back and Operation Soberanía was called off.

Whether the Argentine infantry actually crossed the border into Chile or only waited at the border for the result of the naval combat cannot be established. Argentine sources insist that they crossed the border which would be inconsistent with the two-phase war plan.

Alejandro Luis Corbacho, in "Predicting the probability of war during brinkmanship crisis: The Beagle and the Malvinas conflicts" considers the reasons for cancelling the operation (p. 45):

The newspaper Clarín explained some years later that such caution was based, in part, on military concerns. In order to achieve a victory, certain objectives had to be reached before the seventh day after the attack. Some military leaders considered this not enough time due to the difficulty involved in transportation through the passes over the Andean Mountains.

On p. 46:

According to Clarín, two consequences were feared. First, those who were dubious feared a possible regionalization of the conflict. Second, as a consequence, the conflict could acquire great power proportions. In the first case decisionmakers speculated that Peru, Bolivia, Ecuador, and Brazil might intervene. Then the great powers could take sides. In this case, the resolution of the conflict would depend not on the combatants, but on the countries that supplied the weapons.

== Analysis ==
Unlike the prelude to the 1982 invasion of the Falkland Islands, from the beginning of Operation Soberanía there were no critical misconceptions on Argentina's side about Chile's commitment to defend its territory: the entire Chilean Navy was in the disputed area, an unequivocal fact at Cape Horn. As stated by David R. Mares in "Violent Peace: Militarized Interstate Bargaining in Latin America":

These Chilean advantages do not imply that it could have won the war against Argentina, but that is not the relevant point. To deter their neighbors the Chileans do not have to demonstrate a capability to win. They need, instead, to make a credible case that a military adventure against Chile would not be cheap. In 1978, the Argentine Junta could not be very confident that war would produce a low-cost victory against Chile.

Although it had called off the operation, the Argentine government never gave up on the use of military force to pressure Chile. After the invasion of the Falklands on 2 April 1982, the Argentine junta planned the military occupation of the disputed islands in the Beagle channel, as stated by Brigadier Basilio Lami Dozo, chief of the Argentine Air Force during the Falklands war, in an interview with the Argentine magazine Perfil:

L.F. Galtieri: Let [Chile] take note of what we are doing now, because they will be the next in turn.

Augusto Pinochet foresaw a lengthy struggle, characterized by partisan warfare:

a guerrilla war, killing every day, shooting people, by both sides, and in the end, by a matter of fatigue, we would have reached peace

Argentine Falklands War veteran Martín Balza, Chief of Staff of the Argentine Army (1991–1999), caused a stir in 2003 when he declared his conviction that in 1978, Chile would have won the war had it broken out.

== See also ==
- Falklands War

== Bibliography ==
- "Beagle Channel Arbitration between the Republic of Argentina and the Republic of Chile." Report and Decision of the Court of Arbitration via legal.un.org.
- Cisneros, Andrés and Carlos Escudé. "Las relaciones con Chile." Historia general de las Relaciones Exteriores de la República Argentina (in Spanish). Buenos Aires: Cema.
- Corbacho, Alejandro Luis. Predicting the Probability of War During Brinkmanship Crises: The Beagle and the Malvinas Conflicts. (Spanish Language) Universidad del CEMA, Argentina, Documento de Trabajo No. 244, September 2003.
- Escudé, Carlos and Andrés Cisneros. Historia general de las relaciones exteriores de la República Argentina. (in Spanish)
- Gugliamelli, Juan E., Divisionsgeneral (a.D.). Cuestión del Beagle. Negociación directa o diálogo de armas (Trans.:The Beagle-Question, direct Negotiations or Dialog of the Weapons), in Spanish Language. (Book compiled from articles of Argentine Magazin "Estrategia", Buenos Aires Nr:49/50, enero-febrero 1978, published.
- Haffa, Annegret I. Beagle-Konflikt und Falkland (Malwinen)-Krieg. Zur Außenpolitik der Argentinischen Militarregierung 1976-1983 (in German). München/Köln/London: Weltforum Verlag, 1987. ISBN 3-8039-0348-3.
- Hernekamp, Karl. Der argentinisch-chilenisch Grenzstreit am Beagle-Kanal (in German). Hamburg: Institut für Iberoamerika-Kunde, 1980.
- Laudy, Mark. The Vatican Mediation of the Beagle Channel Dispute: Crisis Intervention and Forum Building in Words Over War of Carnegie Commission on Preventing Deadly Conflict.
- Madrid, Alberto Marín. El arbitraje del Beagle y la actitud Argentina. 1984, Editorial Moisés Garrido Urrea, id = A-1374-84 XIII, (in Spanish)
- Madrid Murúa, Rubén. "La Estrategia Nacional y Militar que planificó Argentina, en el marco de una estrategia total, para enfrentar el conflicto con Chile el año 1978", Memorial del Ejército de Chile, Edición Nº 471, Santiago, Chile, 2003, Spanish Language
- Martín, Antonio Balza General and Mariano Grondona: Dejo Constancia: memorias de un general argentino. Editorial Planeta, Buenos Aires 2001, ISBN 950-49-0813-6, Spanish Language
- Ministerio de Relaciones Exteriores de Chile. Relaciones Chileno-Argentinas, La controversia del Beagle. Genf 1979, English and Spanish Language
- Oellers-Frahm, Karin. Der Schiedsspruch in der Beagle-Kanal-Streitigkeit, Berichte und Urkunden: Max-Planck-Institut für ausländisches öffentliches Recht und Völkerrecht, German Language
- Olivos, Sergio Gutiérrez. Comentarios sobre el tratado de paz y amistad con Argentina. Academia Chilena de Ciencias Sociales, 1985, in Spanish language
- Rojas, Isaac F. La Argentina en el Beagle y Atlántico sur 1. Parte. Editorial Diagraf, Buenos Aires, Argentina, Spanish Language
- Rojas, Isaac F. and Arturo Medrano: Argentina en el Atlántico, Chile en el Pacífico. Editorial Nemont, Buenos Aires, Argentina, 1979, (in Spanish).
- Romero, Luis Alberto. Argentina in the twentieth Century. Pennsylvania State University Press, translated by James P. Brennan, 1994, ISBN 0-271-02191-8.
- Serrano, Francisco Bulnes and Patricia Arancibia Clavel. La Escuadra En Acción (in Spanish). Chile, Editorial Grijalbo, 2004, ISBN 956-258-211-6.
- Valdivieso, Fabio Vio. La mediación de su S.S. el Papa Juan Pablo II, Editorial Aconcagua, Santiago de Chile, 1984, Spanish Language
- Wagner, Andrea. Der argentinisch-chilenische Konflikt um den Beagle-Kanal. Ein Beitrag zu den Methoden friedlicher Streiterledigung. Verlag Peter Lang, Frankfurt a.M. 1992, ISBN 3-631-43590-8, German Language
- Amato, Alberto; Pavon, Héctor; Rubín, Sergio; Lecziky, Uri; Guido, Braslavsky (20 December 1998). "El belicismo de los dictadores, Instrucciones Políticas Particulares para la Zona Austral para la Etapa Posterior a la Ejecución de Actos de Soberanía en las Islas en Litigio". Clarin (in Spanish). Buenos Aires. Archived from the original on 15 April 2011.
