= Cazadores de Montaña (Argentine Army) =

Cazadores de Montaña should not be confused with Cazadores de Monte

The Cazadores de Montaña (Spanish for Mountain Huntsmen), are special Mountain troops of the Argentine Army.

Currently there are two Mountain Huntsmen units:

- The 6th Mountain Cazadores Company (Spanish: Compañía de Cazadores de Montaña 6), which is part of the 6th Mountain Infantry Brigade
- The 8th Mountain Cazadores Company (Spanish: Compañía de Cazadores de Montaña 8), which is part of the 8th Mountain Infantry Brigade

These units are specialised in mountain warfare.

== See also ==
- List of mountain warfare forces
- Huntsmen (military)
- France: Chasseurs Alpins
- Germany: Gebirgsjäger
- Italy: Alpini
- Poland: Podhale rifles
- Romania: Vânători de munte
