= Covunco Abajo =

Coordinates: 38°37′38″S 69°50′24″W

- Interactive map of Covunco Abajo
- Country: Argentina
- Province: Neuquén
- Department: Zapala
- Founded: 1997

Population (2020)
  - Total: 220

Covunco Abajo is a town in Zapala Department, Neuquén Province, Argentina. It had a population of 220 as of the 2010 Census.
