= Covunco Centro =

Village and municipality in Argentina

Coordinates: 38°45′04″S 70°01′26″W

Covunco Centro is a village and municipality in the Zapala Department, Neuquén Province, in southwestern Argentina. It is located at the crossroads of provincial routes 3 and 14, 1.5 km from the center of Mariano Moreno, of which it is a suburb, between both towns they have 2,660 inhabitants (Indec, 2010).

== History ==
In 1879, the fourth division of the Argentine Army was based at the confluence of the Covunco stream with the Neuquén river in the paraje called Covunco Centro, formerly called Fortín Covunco. Before the construction of the town, the soldiers lived in tents. The town was the first permanent military settlement in Patagonia, which was built in 1937; Its streets are paved and the houses of the officers and non-commissioned officers are distinguished by tile and stone coverings. Engineers of German origin presided over the construction that included a power plant and irrigation canals for the town; The town of Mariano Moreno had its origin in this settlement, since many of its first settlers were personnel who arrived for the construction of the barracks.
