= Villa del Puente Picún Leufú =

Coordinates: 39°12′08″S 70°06′22″W

Villa del Puente Picún Leufú is a village spread through Zapala Department and Catán Lil Department, Neuquén Province, in southwestern Argentina. It was created as a Development Commission at the request of the communities of Puente Picún Leufú and Bajada Los Molles in 1991. The town has 221 inhabitants (Indec, 2010). Of the 221 inhabitants, 112 live in the municipal administration of the Catán Lil Department and 109 live in the municipal administration located in the Zapala Department.
