= VIII Mountain Brigade =

8th Mountain Infantry Brigade
- Brigada de Montaña VIII
- Country: Argentina
- Branch: Argentine Army
- Type: Mountain infantry
- Size: Brigade
- Part of: 2nd Army Division
- Garrison/HQ: Mendoza, Argentina
- Patron: Brigadier General Toribio de Luzuriaga
- Engagements: Operativo Independencia; Falklands War

The 8th Mountain Infantry Brigade (Spanish: Brigada de Montaña 8/VIII) is a one of three combined mountain infantry brigade Argentine Army (EA) specialised in combat patrol in mountain forest terrain, combined arms, and mountain warfare. The headquarters of the Brigade is based on Mendoza, Mendoza Province. Is formed by different types of mountain units:

== Order of battle ==
- 11th Mountain Infantry Regiment "General Las Heras", based at Tupungato, Mendoza Province.
- 16th Mountain Infantry Regiment "Cazadores de Los Andes", based at Uspallata, Mendoza Province.
- 22nd Mountain Infantry Regiment "Teniente Coronel Juan Manuel Cabot", based at El Marquesado, San Juan Province.
- 8th Mountain Cazadores Company "Teniente 1ro Ibañez", based at Puente del Inca, Mendoza Province.
- 15th Light Cavalry Regiment "Libertador Simón Bolívar", based at Campo de los Andes, Mendoza Province.
- 8th Mountain Artillery Group "Coronel Regalado de la Plaza", based at Uspallata, Mendoza Province.
- 7th Artillery Group, San Luis, San Luis Province.
