= XII Bush Brigade =

12th Bush Brigade
- Brigada de Monte XII
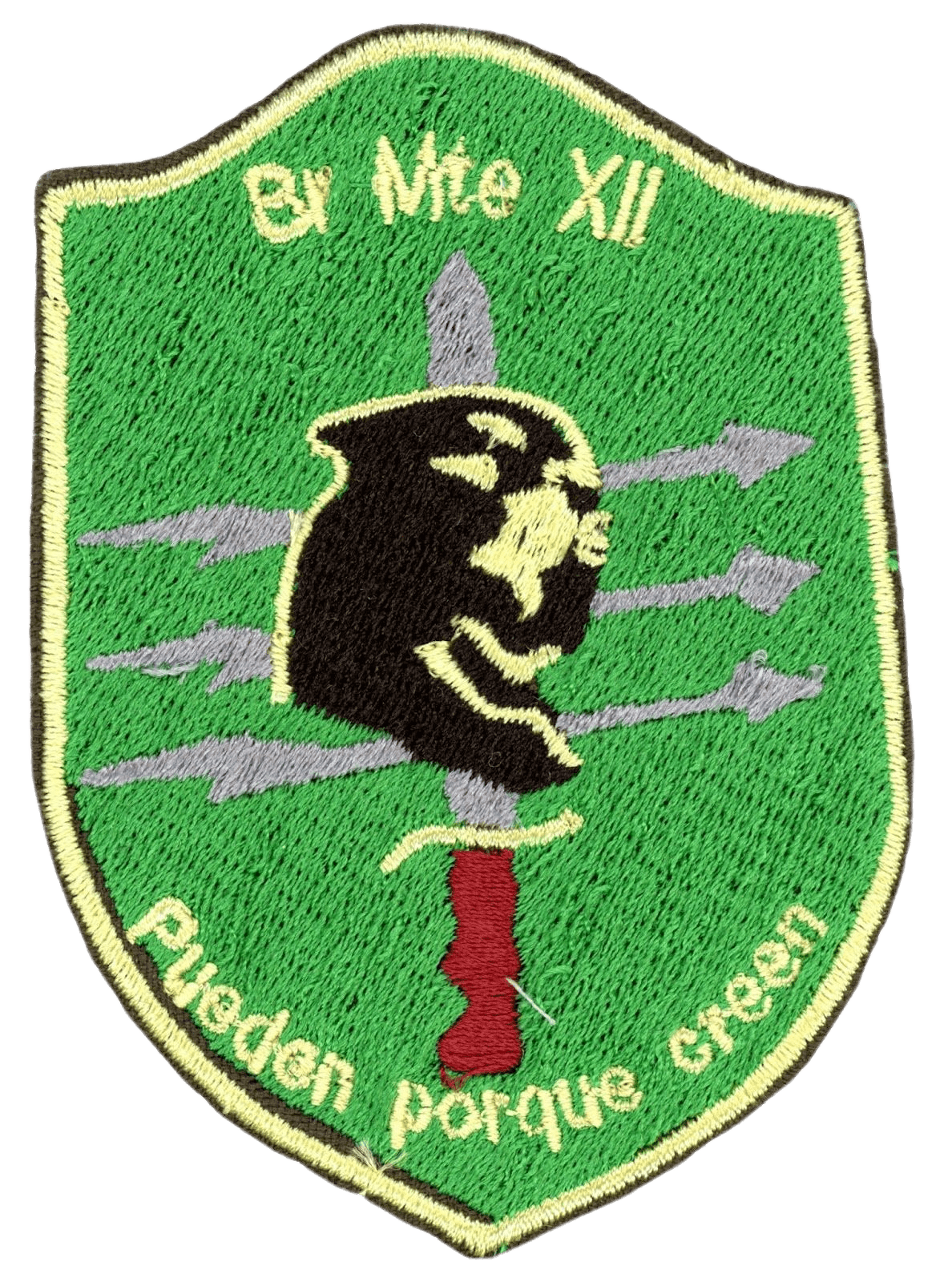
- Shoulder patch of the XII Bush Brigade
- Active: 26 November 1979 - present
- Country: Argentina
- Branch: Argentine Army
- Type: Infantry
- Size: Brigade
- Part of: 1st Army Division
- Garrison/HQ: Posadas, Misiones
- Patron: General Manuel Obligado
- Equipment: Browning Hi-Power 9 mm FN FAL 7,62 mm FN MAG 7,62 mm
- Engagements: South American wars of independence; Operativo Independencia; Falklands War

Commanders
- Current commander: Colonel Juan Antonio Zamora

Aircraft flown
- Helicopter: Bell UH-1 Iroquois

The 12th Bush Brigade (Spanish: Brigada de Monte 12) is a combined infantry unit of the Argentine Army (EA) specialised in combat patrol, combined arms, counterinsurgency, and jungle warfare. Its headquarters are at Posadas, Misiones Province.

== Order of battle ==
- 12th Bush Brigade HQ (Posadas)
- 9th Bush Infantry Regiment (Puerto Iguazú)
- 29th Bush Infantry Regiment "Coronel Ignacio José Javier Warnes" (Formosa)
- 30th Bush Infantry Regiment (Apóstoles)
- 3rd Artillery Group (Paso de los Libres)
- 12th Engineer Battalion (Goya)
- 12th Jungle Cazadores Company (Puerto Iguazú)
- 18th Bush Infantry Company (Bernardo de Irigoyen)
- 12th Signal Squadron (Posadas)
- 12th Intelligence Company (Posadas)
- 12th Medical Company (Posadas)
- Logistic & Support Base "Resistencia" (Resistencia)
- 12th Army Aviation Section (Posadas)

== History ==
In 1979 the Argentine Army created the 12th Bush Brigade. This unit was formed by:

- 18th Infantry Regiment
- 30th Infantry Regiment
- 12th Artillery Group
- 12th Armored Cavalry Exploration Squadron
- 12th Company of Engineers
- 12th Company of Construction Engineers
- 12th Communications Company

In 1985 the 7th Infantry Brigade was dissolved and its dependent units became part of the 12th Infantry Brigade.
