= XI Mechanized Brigade (Argentina) =

Brigade of the Argentine Army based in Río Gallegos

XI Mechanized Brigade "Brigadier General Juan Manuel de Rosas"
- XI Brigada Mecanizada "Brigadier General Juan Manuel de Rosas"
- Active: 7 February 1979
- Country: Argentina
- Branch: Argentine Army
- Type: Brigade
- Part of: 3rd Army Division
- Garrison/HQ: "Río Gallegos" Army Garrison

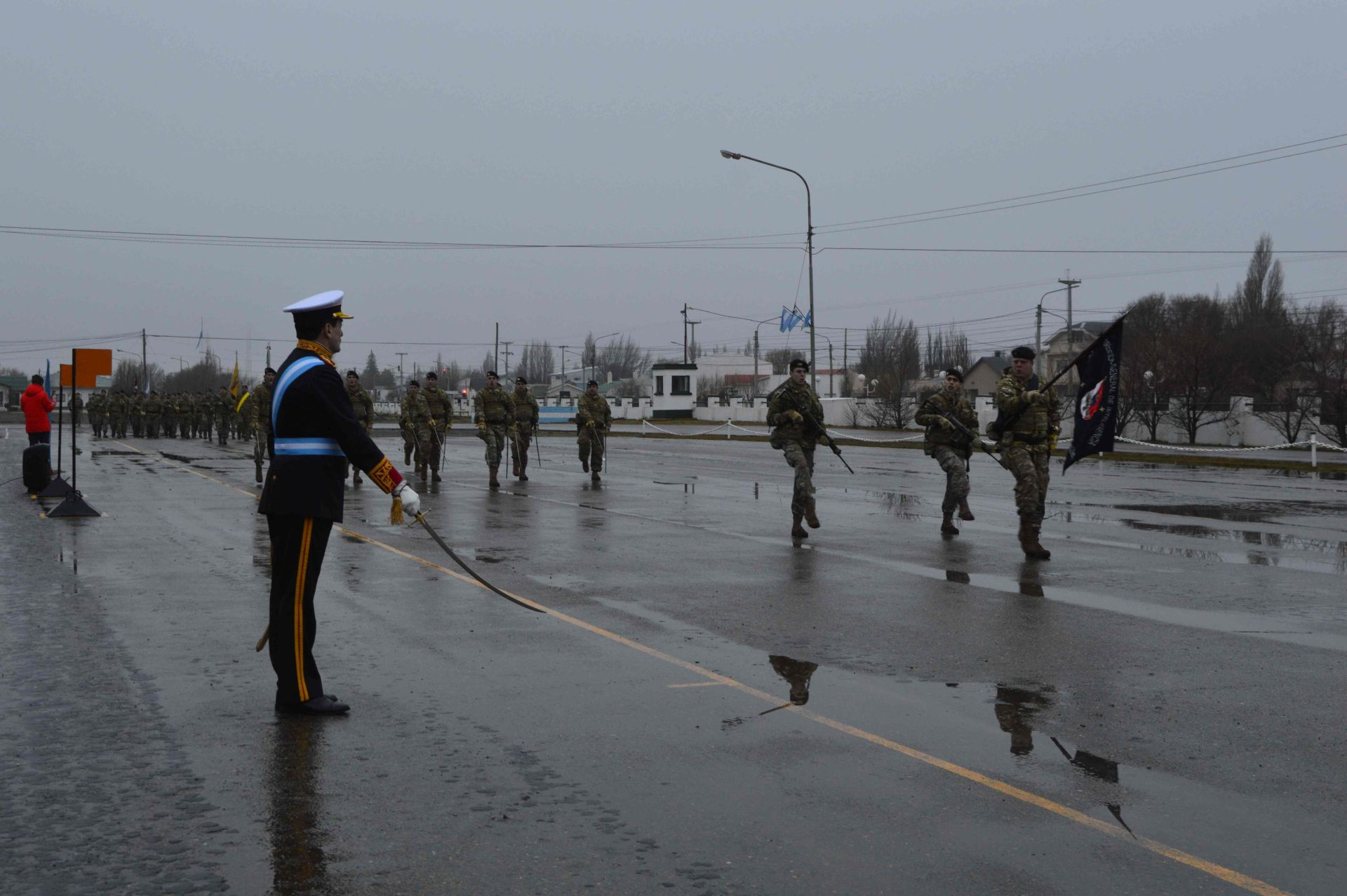
Parade in Río Gallegos Army Garrison for Independence Day, 9 July 2020.

The XI Mechanized Brigade "Brigadier General Juan Manuel de Rosas" is a brigade of the Argentine Army. It is based at the “Río Gallegos” Army Garrison.

The Army Command-in-Chief created the "Santa Cruz" Grouping on 7 February 1979.

== Structure ==
- XI Mechanized Brigade Command. Guar Ej Río Gallegos.
  - 24th Mechanized Infantry Regiment “General Jerónimo Costa”. Guar Ej Río Gallegos.
  - 35th Mechanized Infantry Regiment “Coronel Manuel Dorrego”. Guar Ej Rospentek.
  - 11th Tank Cavalry Regiment “Defensores del Honor Nacional”. Guar Ej Puerto Santa Cruz.
  - 11th Armored Exploration Cavalry Squadron “Coronel Juan Pascual Pringles”. Guar Ej Rospentek.
  - 11th Armored Artillery Group “Coronel Juan Bautista Thorne”. Guar Ej Comandante Luis Piedrabuena.
  - 11th Mechanized Engineer Battalion. UMRE XI. Guar Ej Comandante Luis Piedrabuena.
  - 11th Mechanized Signals Company. Guar Ej Río Gallegos.
  - 11th Army Aviation Section. Guar Ej Río Gallegos.
  - 11th Mechanized Intelligence Company. Guar Ej Río Gallegos.
  - “El Turbio” Mechanized Intelligence Section. Guar Ej Rospentek.
  - “Río Gallegos” Logistic Support Base. Guar Ej Río Gallegos.
  - 181st Munition Company. Guar Ej Puerto Santa Cruz.
  - Delegation of the Army General Staff in the province of Tierra del Fuego. Base: Ushuaia.

Source: Argentine Army, Ministry of Defence
