= 601st Signals Grouping (Argentina) =

Argentine military unit

601 Signals Grouping
- Agrupación de Comunicaciones 601
- Country: Argentina
- Branch: Argentine Army
- Type: Signals unit grouping
- Garrison/HQ: City Bell Army Garrison (Buenos Aires Province)

The 601 Signals Grouping (Agr Com 601) is an Argentine Army signals military grouping. It is headquartered at the City Bell Army Garrison, Buenos Aires Province.

== History ==
In 1986, the 601 Signals Grouping Headquarters settled at the City Bell Barracks, followed by the 601 Signals Battalion, the 601 Electronic Operations Battalion and the “La Plata” Recruitment and Mobilization Division.

In 2019 became part of the Army Enlistment and Training Command.

== Structure ==
- 601 Signals Grouping Headquarters (Jefatura de la Agrupación de Comunicaciones 601). Base: City Bell Army Garrison (Buenos Aires Province).
  - 601 Signals Battalion (Batallón de Comunicaciones 601). Base: City Bell Army Garrison (Buenos Aires Province).
  - 601 Electronic Operations Battalion (Batallón de Operaciones Electrónicas 601). Base: City Bell Army Garrison (Buenos Aires Province).
  - 601 Signals Maintenance Battalion (Batallón de Mantenimiento de Comunicaciones 601). Base: City Bell Army Garrison (Buenos Aires Province).
