= Cesáreo Cardozo =

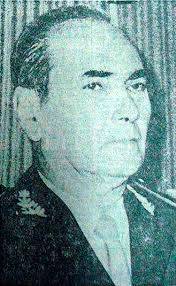
Cesáreo Cardozo

Cesáreo Ángel Cardozo (27 February 1926 – 18 June 1976) was an Argentinian military officer who has been Chief of the Argentine Federal Police. He was Military Attache to Chile, Interim Minister of Interior of Argentina in the Military Junta of 1976. Serving as chief of the police in 1976, he was assassinated when a bomb placed by the Montoneros exploded under his bed at his home in Buenos Aires.

== Career and family ==
He was born in Hurlingham, Buenos Aires. He was married to Susana Beatriz Rivas Espora and had three children.

He graduated from the Colegio Militar de la Nación in 1947 as Sub-Lieutenant of Infantry. He was in many academic institutions of the Argentine Army such as Escuela Superior de Guerra, which he was director, among others. He was designated as Militar Attache to Chile in 1976, and after being part of de coup d'état in March 1976 he was designated as Interim Minister of Interior by the Military junta which take the power, but he served just a few days. In March 31 of that year he was designated as Chief of Argentine Federal Police. According Página 12 newspaper Cardozo was related to crimes against humanity in that period, but it wasn't never proved.

== Death ==
On 18 June 1976 he was killed by a bomb of 700 grams of TNT placed by an 18-year-old Montoneros member named Ana María González in his apartment in Buenos Aires. Gonzáles was a classmate of his daughter and she befriend Cardozo's daughter so as to be invited to the family home in order to place the bomb. The murder had a huge impact on public opinion since Cardozo was a high-ranking officer involved in the Dirty War as chief of police. Also Cardozo's wife was seriously injured, but survived the explosion.

González stated that he was responsible of the "murder, torture and death of hundreds of comrades". On 4 January 1977 Gonzalez was killed in a shootout with police forces along with other members of Montoneros.
