= 3rd Army Division (Argentina) =

Argentine military unit

- División de Ejército 3
- Country: Argentina
- Branch: Argentine Army
- Size: Division
- Part of: Army Enlistment and Training Command
- Garrison/HQ: Bahía Blanca
- Nickname(s): DE 3
- Patron: Lieutenant General Julio Argentino Roca
- Website: www.divisionejercito3.ejercito.mil.ar/

Commanders
- Commander: General of Brigade Daniel Eduardo Varela (February 2018)
- 2nd Commander and Chief of Staff: General of Brigade

The 3rd Army Division (Spanish: División de Ejército 3) is a combined forces between armored brigade and mechanized brigade of the Argentine Army (EA).

== Organization ==
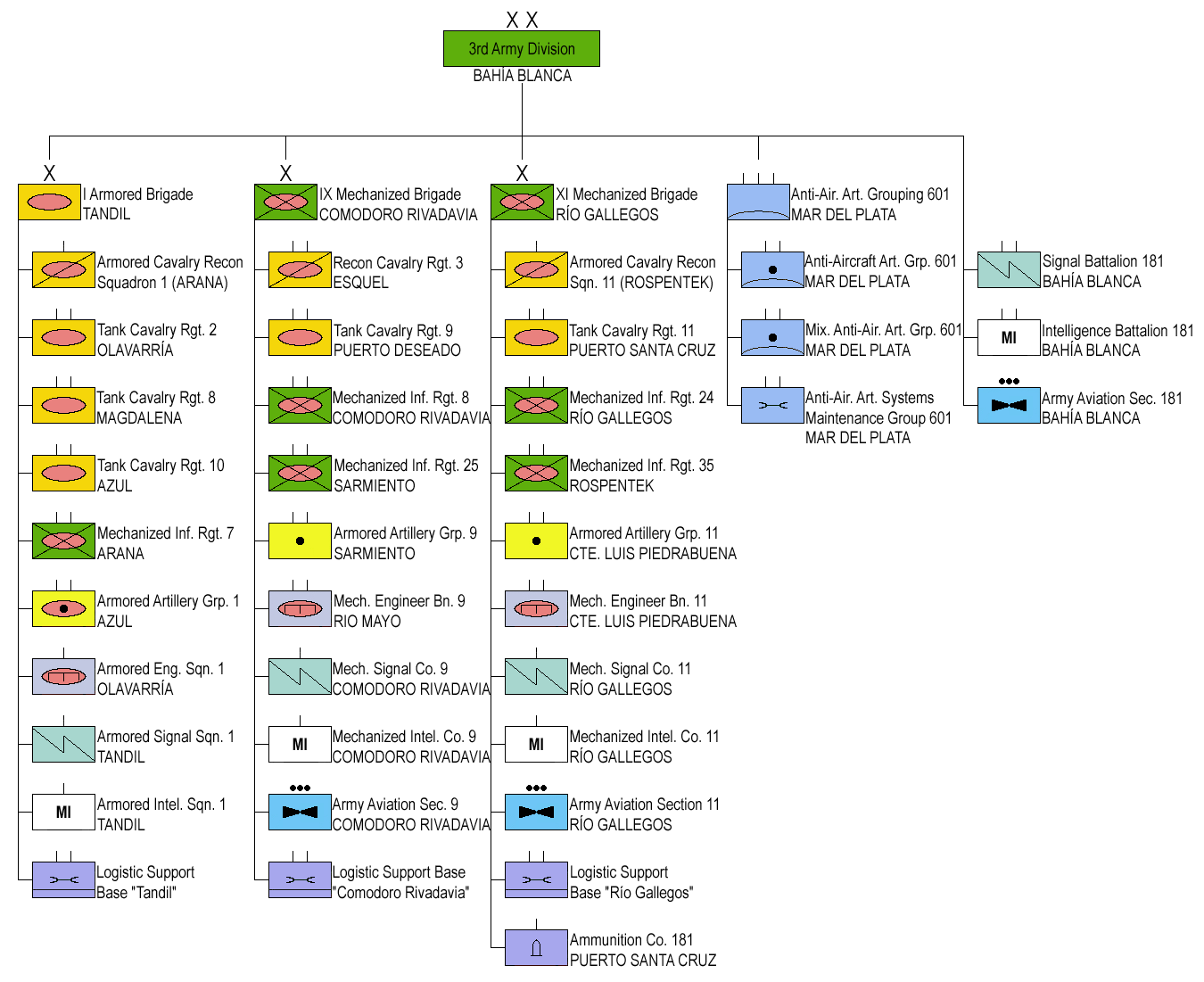
3rd Army Division organization 2020 (click to enlarge)

- 3rd Army Division, in Bahía Blanca
  - I Armored Brigade, in Tandil
  - IX Mechanized Brigade, in Comodoro Rivadavia
  - XI Mechanized Brigade, in Río Gallegos

== Names ==
- 5th Army Corps (Spanish: Cuerpo de Ejército 5)
- 3rd Army Division (Spanish: División de Ejército 3)

== See also ==
- 1st Army Division (Argentina)
- 2nd Army Division (Argentina)
