= 1st Tank Cavalry Regiment (Argentina) =

Argentine military unit

- Regimiento de Caballería de Tanques 1
- Active: 1 March 1822 - 8 February 1905; 10 February 1930 - present
- Country: Argentine Republic
- Branch: Argentine Army
- Type: Cavalry
- Role: Armoured warfare
- Size: Regiment
- Part of: Command of the 2nd Armored Brigade
- Garrison/HQ: Villaguay Army Garrison
- Nickname(s): RC Tan 1
- Patron: Colonel Federico de Brandsen
- Motto(s): "Tanques 1"
- March: Regiment march
- Anniversaries: 1 March - Creation of the regiment
- Equipment: TAM, VCTP, SIMRA, Ford F-100 (ambulance), Ford F-7000, Isuzu Trooper
- Engagements: Cisplatine War, Paraguayan War, Falklands War
- Battle honours: Coat and Cord de Ituzaingó; Cord de Tuyutí; Metal of Yatay; Medal for the Campaign to Paraguay; Medal for the Campaign to the Black River; Medal for the Andes Campaign.

Commanders
- Notable commanders: Federico de Brandsen (first commander)

The 1st Tank Cavalry Regiment is a cavalry regiment of the Argentine Army, currently endowed with TAM tanks.

It has his seat in the Army Garrison of Villaguay (Entre Ríos province), which it shares with the 5th Mechanized Infantry Regiment.
