= 1st Army Division (Argentina) =

Argentine military unit

- División de Ejército 1
- Country: Argentina
- Branch: Argentine Army
- Size: Division
- Part of: Army Enlistment and Training Command
- Garrison/HQ: Curuzú Cuatiá
- Nickname(s): DE 1
- Patron: Lieutenant General Juan Carlos Sánchez
- Website: www.divisionejercito1.ejercito.mil.ar/

Commanders
- Commander: General of Brigade
- 2nd Commander and Chief of Staff: General of Brigade

The 1st Army Division (Spanish: División de Ejército 1) is a unit of the Argentine Army.

== Organization ==
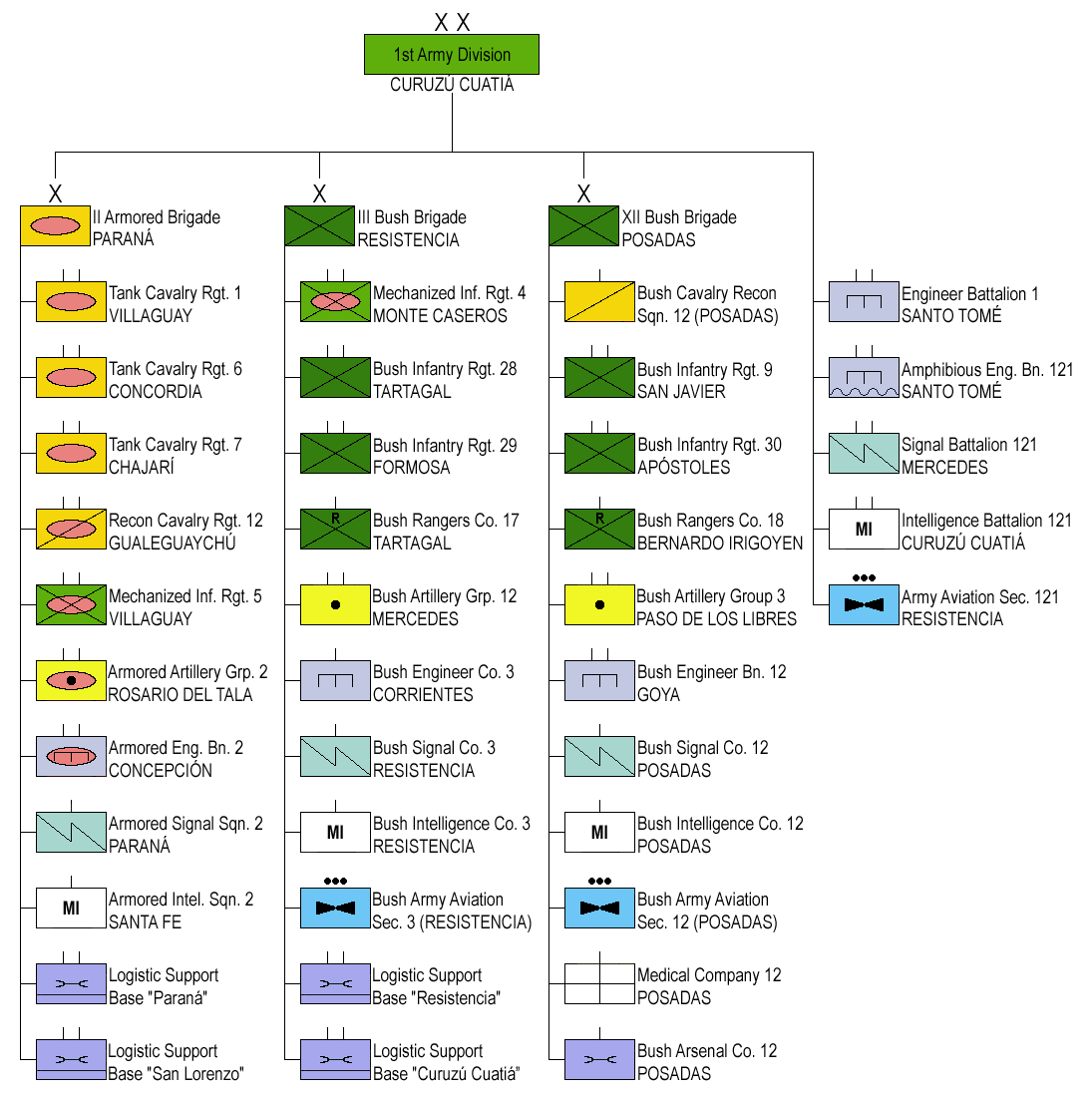
1st Army Division organization 2020 (click to enlarge)

- 1st Army Division, in Curuzú Cuatiá
  - II Armored Brigade, in Paraná
  - III Bush Brigade, in Resistencia
  - XII Bush Brigade, in Posadas

== See also ==
- 2nd Army Division (Argentina)
- 3rd Army Division (Argentina)
