= Mariano Moreno, Neuquén =

Mariano Moreno
- Municipality and village
- Location within Neuquén Province Location within Argentina
- Coordinates: 38°44′S 70°01′W
- Country: Argentina
- Province: Neuquén Province
- Time zone: UTC−3 (ART)
- Climate: BSk

Mariano Moreno (Neuquén) is a village and municipality in Neuquén Province in southwestern Argentina.
