= I Armored Brigade (Argentina) =

1st Armor Brigade
- Ira Brigada Blindada
- Active: 14 October 1936
- Country: Argentina
- Branch: Argentine Army
- Type: Combined arms
- Role: Armoured warfare
- Size: Brigade
- Part of: 3rd Army Division
- Garrison/HQ: Tandil
- Nickname(s): Br Bl 1
- Patron: Brigadier General Martín Rodríguez
- Engagements: Falklands War

Commanders
- Current commander: Colonel Norberto Pedro Zárate

The 1st Armor Brigade (Spanish: Brigada Blindada I) is one of the combined arms brigades of the Argentine Army.

== Order of battle ==
Unit	Location	Equipment
1st Armored Brigade HQ	Tandil	
2nd Tank Cavalry Regiment "Lanceros General Paz"	Olavarría	TAM, SIMRA
8th Tank Cavalry Regiment "Cazadores General Necochea"	Magdalena, Buenos Aires	TAM, MB-230G, REO M35, VCTM
10th Tank Cavalry Regiment "Húsares de Pueyrredón"	Azul	TAM, VCPC, VCTM
7th Mechanized Infantry Regiment "Colonel Conde"	Arana	VCTP, VCTM, VCPC, Fiat 697, carts
1st Armored Artillery Group "Colonel Chilavert"	Azul	AMX MK F3, AMX-VCI, RATRAS
1st Armored Cavalry Reconnaissance Troop	Arana	M1097A2/M1025A2, Panhard AML-90, NIRO 1, Mk 19, BGM-71 TOW, REO, MB-230G, Unimog
1st Armored Engineer Company	Olavarría	AMX-VCI
1st Armored Signal Company	Tandil	AMV-VCI
1st Intelligence Company	Tandil	ICOM-738
1st Health Company	Tandil	
Logistic & Support Base "Tandil"	Tandil	
