= Primeros Pinos =

- Municipality and village
- Location within Neuquén Province Location within Argentina
- Coordinates: 38°52′07″S 70°34′48″W
- Country: Argentina
- Province: Neuquén Province
- Time zone: UTC−3 (ART)

Primeros Pinos is a village and municipality in Neuquén Province in southwestern Argentina.
