= Campo de Mayo =

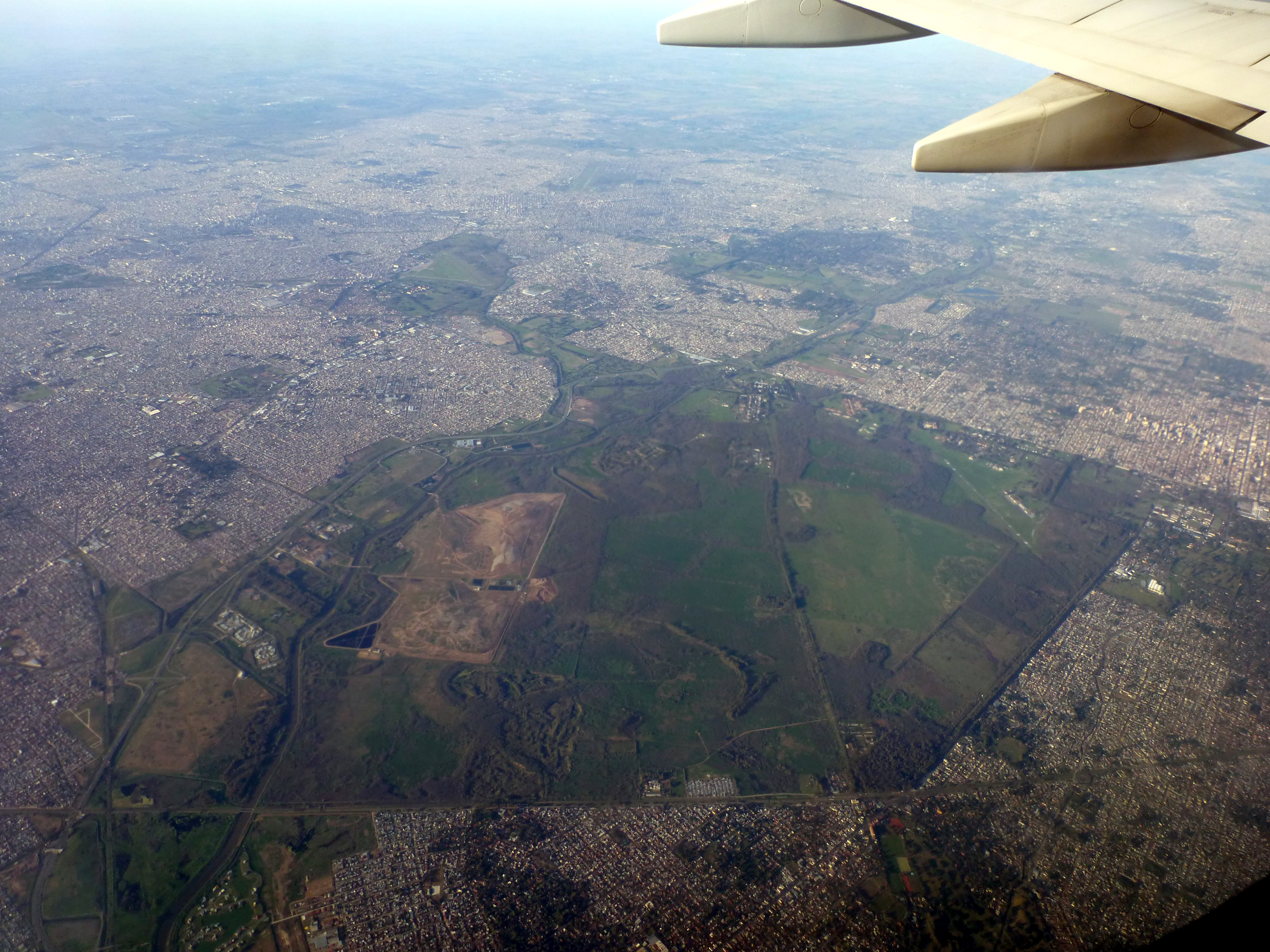

- Location within Greater Buenos Aires Location within Argentina Location within South America
- Coordinates: 34°32′S 58°40′W
- Country: Argentina
- Province: Buenos Aires
- Partido: San Miguel
- Elevation: 22 m (72 ft)

Population (2001 census [INDEC])
  - Total: 1,397
- CPA Base: B 1659
- Area code: +54 11

Campo de Mayo is a military base located in Greater Buenos Aires, Argentina, 30 km (19 mi) northwest of Buenos Aires.

Campo de Mayo covers an area of 8,000 ha (19,768 acres) and is one of the most important military bases in Argentina, including Argentine Army's:

- Army NCO School "Sergeant (CAV) Juan Bautista Cabral"
- Campo de Mayo Military Hospital
- Metropolitan Military Garrison HQ
- Army Infantry School
- Army Cavalry School
- Army School of Communications
- Army Engineering School
- Army Artillery School
- 601 Air Assault Regiment
- 601 Commando Company
- main units of Argentine Army Aviation

It is also home for the aviation service of the Argentine National Gendarmerie

== History ==
Development of the base was authorized by a Congressional bill sponsored by the Minister of War, General Pablo Riccheri, and signed by President Julio Roca on 8 August 1901. A site was later chosen northwest of Buenos Aires, for which land was purchased from Eugenio Mattaldi in 1910.

Between 1976 and 1982, during the de facto military dictatorship called National Reorganization Process, there were four secret detention centres inside the base. The most notorious were "La Casita", "Prisión Militar de Encausados", "El Campito" and the "Hospital Militar," where newborn babies were kidnapped from pregnant women among the disappeared by the regime.

The Campo de mayo was also the site of an April 1987 mutiny by Lt. Col. Aldo Rico and executed by men loyal to him known as Carapintadas ("painted faces," from their use of camouflage paint). Instigated despite the passage of the Full Stop Law, which limited prosecutions of nearly 600 officers implicated in the Dirty War, the incident was tantamount to a coup attempt against President Raúl Alfonsín, who successfully stayed the mutiny.
