= 2nd Army Division (Argentina) =

Argentine military unit

- División de Ejército 2
- Country: Argentina
- Branch: Argentine Army
- Size: Division
- Part of: Army Enlistment and Training Command
- Garrison/HQ: Cordoba
- Nickname(s): DE 2
- Patron: Army of the North (Spanish: Ejército del Norte)
- Website: www.divisionejercito2.ejercito.mil.ar/

Commanders
- Commander: General of Brigade
- 2nd Commander and Chief of Staff: General of Brigade

The 2nd Army Division (Spanish: División de Ejército 2) is a unit of the Argentine Army.

== Organization ==
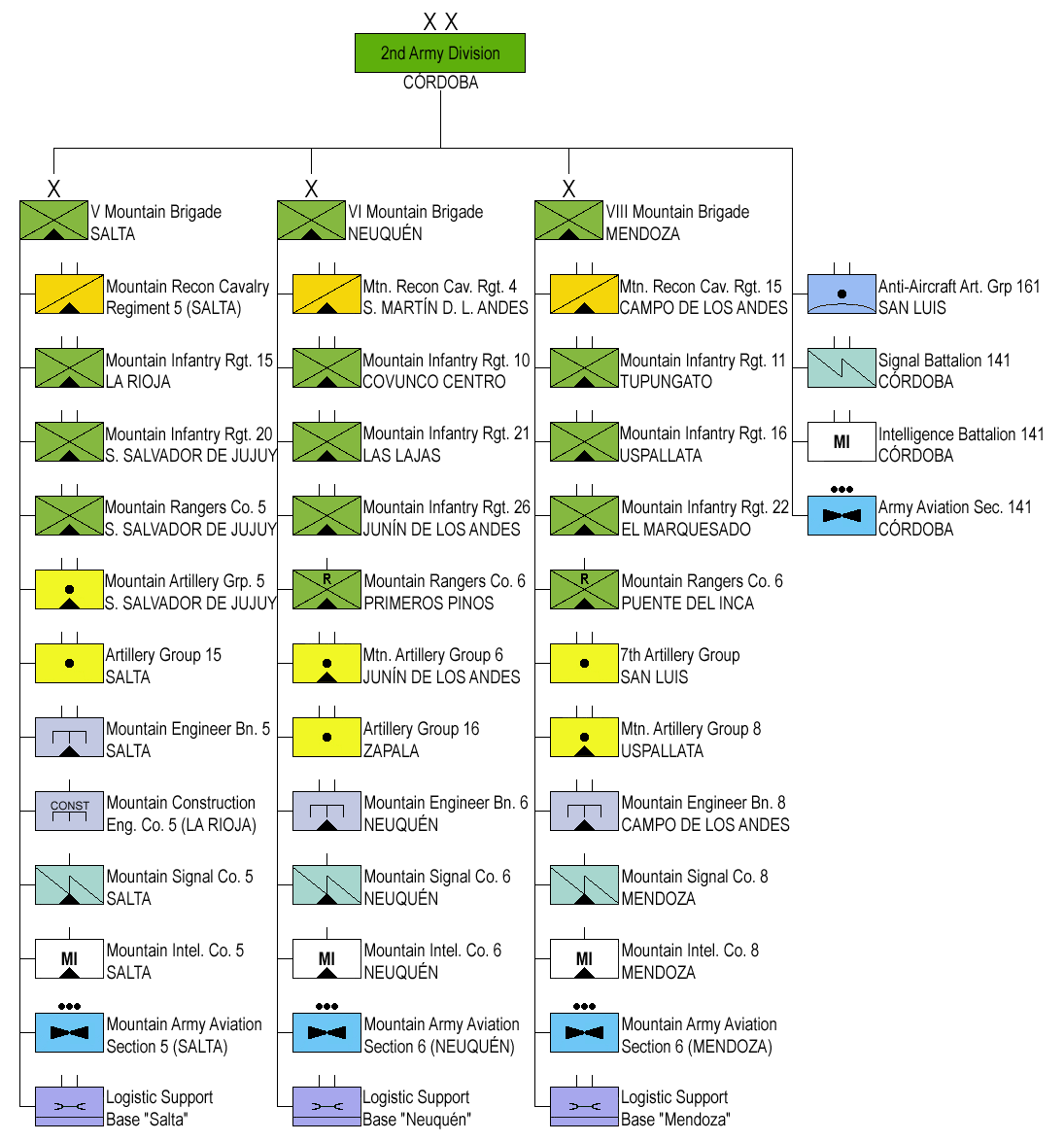
2nd Army Division organization 2020 (click to enlarge)

- 2nd Army Division, in Córdoba
  - V Mountain Brigade, in Salta
  - VI Mountain Brigade, in Neuquén
  - VIII Mountain Brigade, in Mendoza

== See also ==
- 1st Army Division (Argentina)
- 3rd Army Division (Argentina)
