= Ñorquín Department =

Coordinates: 37°38′41″S 70°34′54″W

Ñorquín
- Department
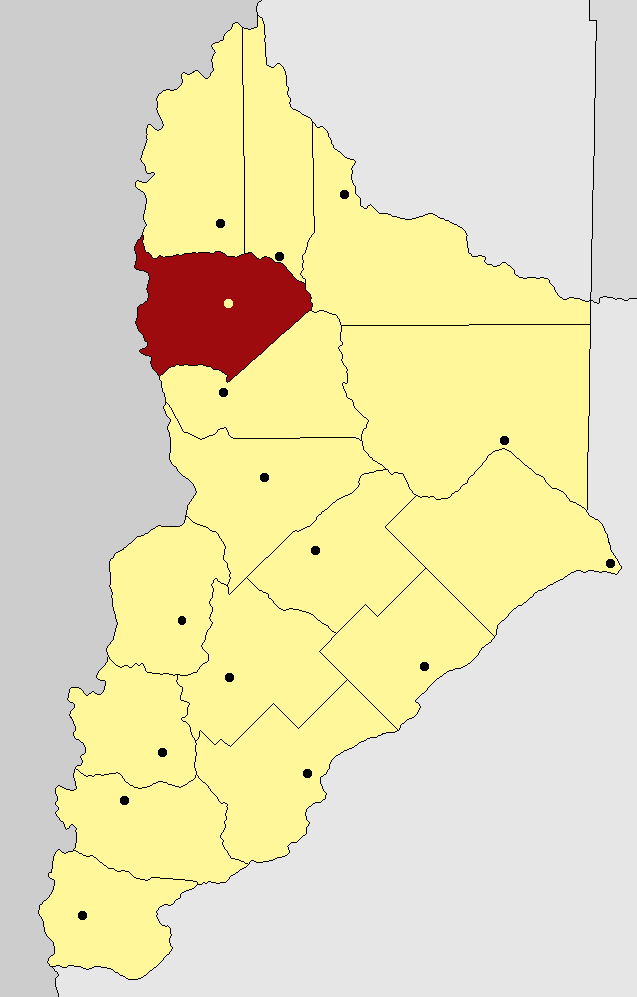
- Country: Argentina
- Capital: El Huecú

Area
  - Total: 5,545 km^{2} (2,141 sq mi)

Population (2022)
  - Total: 5,609
  - Density: 1.012/km^{2} (2.620/sq mi)
- Important cities: El Huecú: Caviahue-Copahue; Colipilli; El Cholar; Naunauco; Rahueco; Ranquilon; Taquimilán; Taquimilan Arriba; Taquimilan Centro; Taquimilan Abajo; Vilu Mallin

Ñorquín is a department located in the north of Neuquén Province, Argentina.

== Geography ==
The Department limits with Minas Department at the Northwest, Chos Malal Department at the northeast, Pehuenches Department at east, Loncopué Department at south and Chile at east.
