= Las Ovejas =

- Town
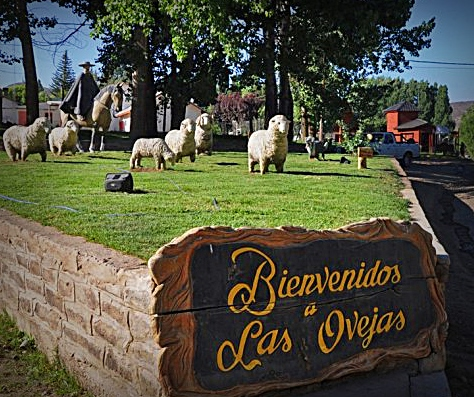
- The town Las Ovejas

- Location within Neuquén Province Location within Argentina
- Coordinates: 36°59′20″S 70°44′57″W
- Country: Argentina
- Province: Neuquén
- Department: Minas

Government
  - Mayor: Héctor Vicente Godoy (Neuquino People's Movement)

Area
  - Total: 73.03 km^{2} (28.20 sq mi)
- Elevation: 1,284 m (4,213 ft)

Population
  - Total: 1,850
  - Density: 25.3/km^{2} (65.6/sq mi)
- Time zone: UTC−3 (ART)
- CPA base: Q8355
- Dialing code: +54 02948
- Climate: Csb

Las Ovejas is a town located in Minas Department, in Neuquén Province, Argentina.

== Geography ==
The town is located 38 km (24 mi) from Andacollo capital city of the department Minas, 96 km (60 mi) from Chos Malal the capital city of Minas Department and 492 km (306 mi) from Neuquén, the capital city of Neuquén Province.

=== Lagoons and Rivers ===
The Neuquén River and the Nahueve River flow near the town, and there is a group of lagoons called Epulaufquen lagoons.

== Population ==
In the 2001 census Las Ovejas recorded a population of 971 inhabitants, an increment of 42,5% after the 1991 census were recorded 685 inhabitants.

== Tourism ==
Las Ovejas is a growing touristic spot, the major attraction to the area is based on fishing in the lagoons few kilometers away from the town. The local fish species in the lagoon are silverside, European perch, rainbow trout, and trout. The Mirador de la Puntilla is a located 6 kilometers from the town, a 120 m gateway where tourists can see the Neuquén river, the Cordillera del Viento (Wind Mountain range) and the Domuyo volcano.
