= Chos Malal Department =

Coordinates: 37°22′42″S 70°16′20″W

Chos Malal
- Department
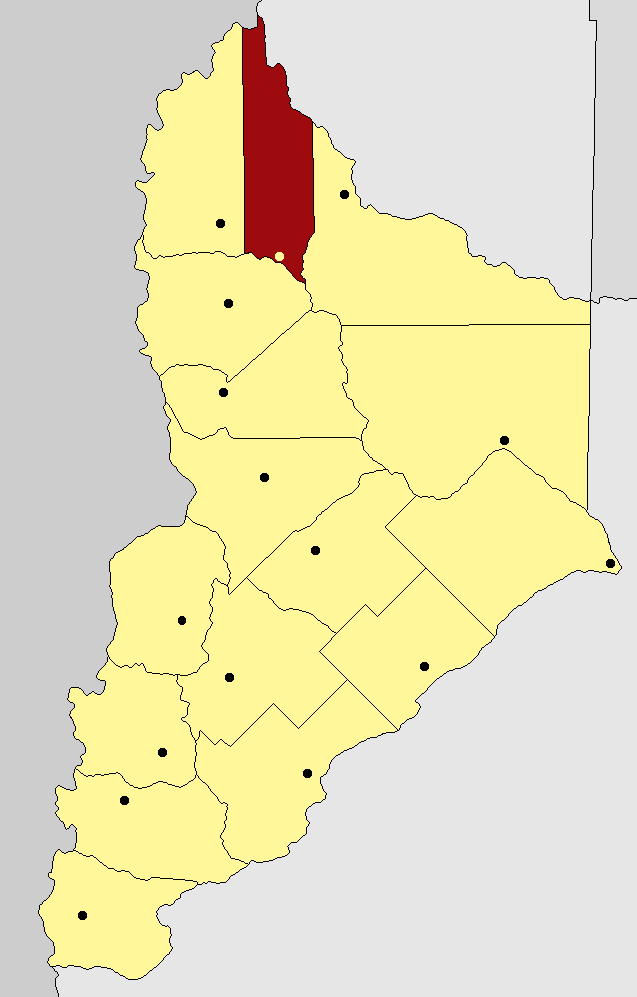
- Country: Argentina
- Province: Neuquén
- Capital: Chos Malal

Area
  - Total: 4,330 km^{2} (1,670 sq mi)

Population (2022)
  - Total: 18,368
  - Density: 4.24/km^{2} (11.0/sq mi)
- Important cities: Chos Malal: Caepe Malal; Chapua; Costa Tilhue; Coyuco-Cochico; El Alamito; La Salada; Lonco Vaca; Los Menucos; Tricao Malal; Villa Curí Leuvú

Chos Malal is a department located in the north of Neuquén Province, Argentina.

== Geography ==
The Department limits with Chile at the North, Mendoza Province at the northeast, Pehuenches Department at southeast, Ñorquín Department at southwest and Minas Department at west.
