= Minas Department, Neuquén =

Minas
- Department
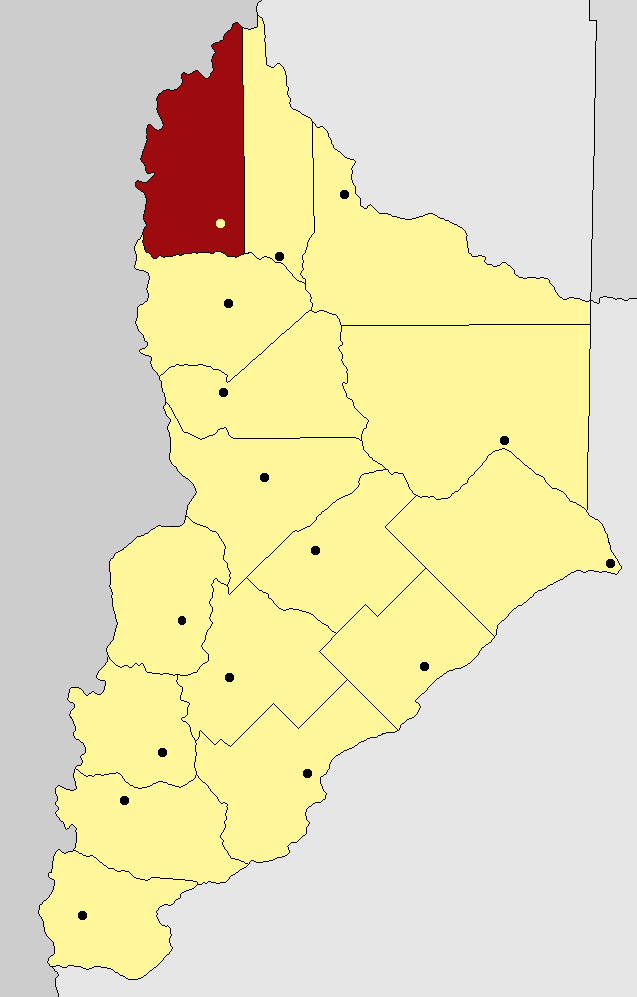
- Country: Argentina
- Province: Neuquén
- Capital: Andacollo

Area
  - Total: 6,225 km^{2} (2,403 sq mi)

Population (2022)
  - Total: 9,267
  - Density: 1.489/km^{2} (3.856/sq mi)
- Important cities: Andacollo: Aguas Calientes; Bella Vista; Chorriaca; Guañacos; Huinganco; Las Ovejas; Los Carrizos; Los Miches; Manzano Amargo; Varvarco/Invernada Vieja; Villa del Nahueve; Pichi Neuquen; Las Lagunas

Minas is a department located in the north of Neuquén Province, Argentina.

== Geography ==
The Department shares borders with Chos Malal Department at the East, Ñorquín Department at the south and Chile at east and northeast.
