= Añelo Department =

Coordinates: 38°21′15″S 68°47′16″W

Añelo
- Department
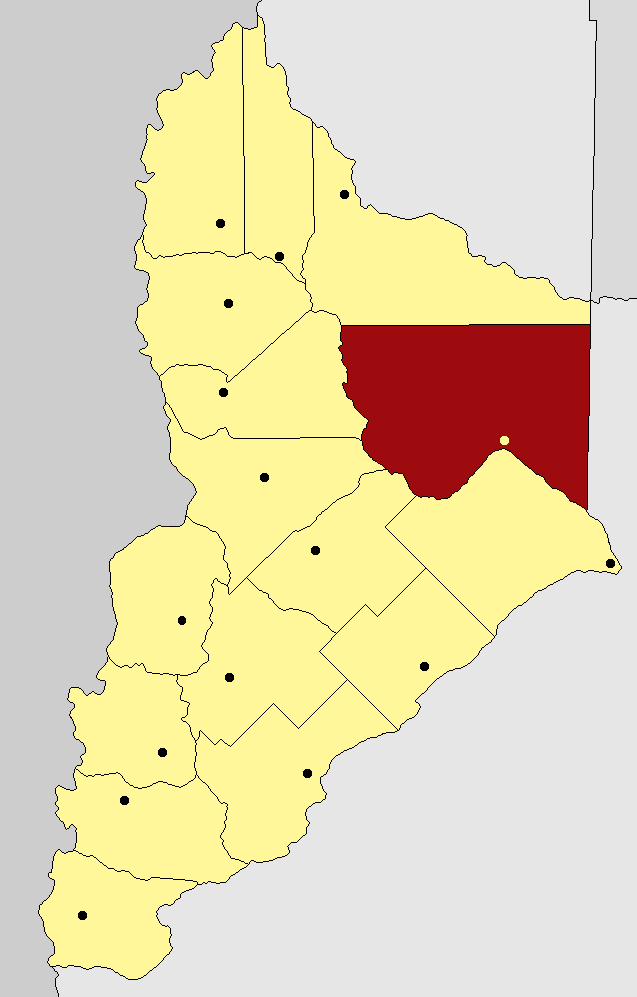
- Country: Argentina
- Province: Neuquén
- Capital: Añelo

Area
  - Total: 11,655 km^{2} (4,500 sq mi)

Population (2022)
  - Total: 18,166
  - Density: 1.5586/km^{2} (4.0369/sq mi)
- Important cities: Añelo: Aguada San Roque; Los Chihuidos; San Patricio del Chañar; Agua de Canale; Cañadon Nogales; Auca Mahuida; Punta Sierra

Añelo is a department located in the east of Neuquén Province, Argentina.

== Geography ==
The Department is bounded by Pehuenches Department in the north, Rio Negro Province to the east, Confluencia Department on the southeast, Zapala Department to the South-southeast, Picunches Department at southwest and Loncopué Department on the west.

== Economy ==
The major product of the area is grapes mostly used for wine-making.

== Culture ==
The Museo del Sitio is located in this department, a Mapuche museum featuring cultural life and a graveyard.
