= Aquihuecó =

Archaeological site in Argentina

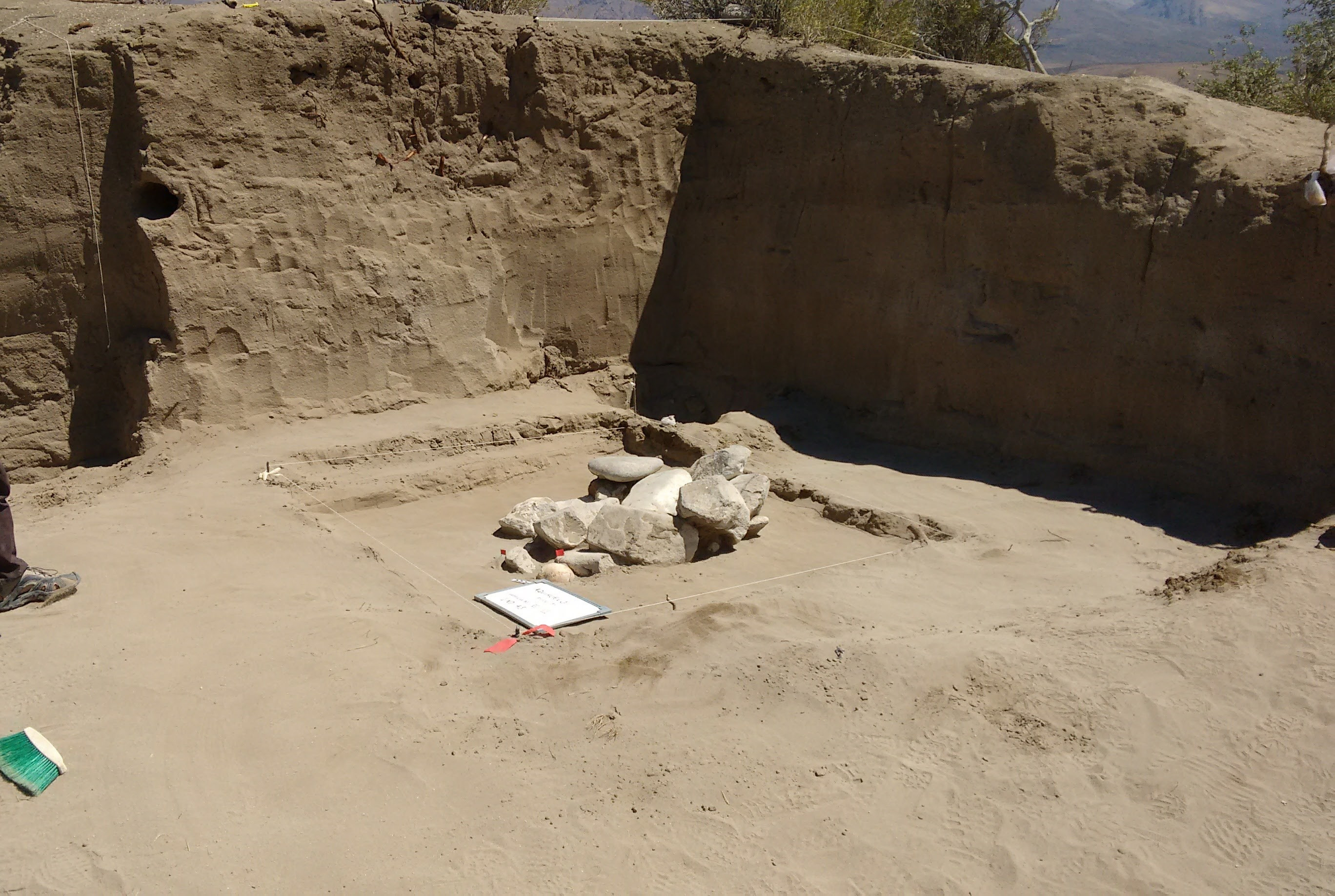
Burial at Aquihuecó

Aquihuecó is an archaeological site in Argentina. It is located by the city of Chos Mahal in the Neuquén province of Argentina. Aquihuecó is the biggest hunter-gatherer burial site in Patagonia. The site is located on top of a mound in a dune and was utilized as an open-air burial site by prehistoric inhabitants of the land. Archaeologists have excavated at least 65 human inhumations at the area. These burials were marked with either large stones or piles of small stones. Many of the graves contained burial goods such as stone pendants, grinding tools, sharp instruments, projectile points, milling tools, lithic spheres, and beads, necklaces, or earrings made from mollusc shells. Some of the skulls found at the site display a circular or pseudocircular body modification of the cranial vault. The site is dated to have been inhabited from around 5000 to around 3000 years before present. Aquihuecó was first discovered in 1997 and began excavation in 2003.
