= Andacollo, Neuquén =

Andacollo
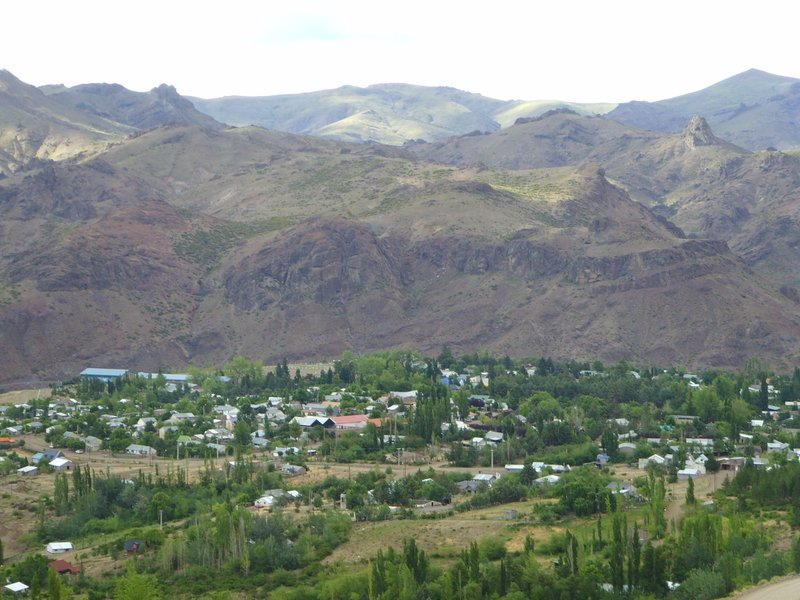

- Location within Neuquén Province Location within Argentina
- Coordinates: 37°10′S 70°40′W
- Country: Argentina
- Province: Neuquén Province
- Department: Minas Department
- Founded: October 26, 1939

Government
  - Mayor: Víctor Esteban Sandoval
- Elevation: 1,113 m (3,652 ft)

Population (2010 census [INDEC])
  - Total: 2,653
- Time zone: UTC−3 (ART)
- CPA Base: Q 8353
- Area code: +54 02945
- Climate: Csb
- Website: www.andacollo.gob.ar

Andacollo is a second category municipality and the administration seat of Minas Department in the province of Neuquén, Argentina. Located in a valley surrounded by the Wind Mountain Range, it is the second-largest municipality in the north of the province after Chos Malal.

It originated as a mining town in the late 19th century, attracting mainly Chilean settlers. Although mining activity diminished in the mid-20th century, it remains a significant sector in the current local economy. The town serves as a service center for the nearby rural areas, where animal husbandry and afforestation are practiced.

== Etymology ==
In its beginnings, the place was known as Cañada del Durazno ("Peaches' Narrow Pass" in Spanish). After Chilean gold prospectors came into the region in the late 19th century, the town was renamed Andacollo in 1910, honoring Andacollo, the settlers' home town in the neighboring country.

The origin of the name of the town, although disputed, is believed to come from the Kichwa words anta and coya, which can be translated as Queen of Metal or Copper Mine. A popular translation among the locals is "woman with cat eyes", which is not certain.

== History ==
The area of Andacollo was originally populated by the Pehuenche people.

In 1882, Chilean prospectors formed a settlement as a base for their search for gold in the mountains of the area, which meant a population influx for the Minas Department. The prospectors were nicknamed Pirquineros, the miners carried a canvass of the virgin of Andacollo.

From 1910 until around 1923, the town's anniversary was celebrated in February. The developing committee, which was the first local institution, was established by Governor Elordi in 1932. The national Government recognized the town's name by a decree on 26 October 1939. This date has been considered the anniversary ever since.

The gold mining industry saw a boom between the 1920s and the 1950s. It started decaying in the late 1940s due to the fall of the international gold prices, which along with a crisis in the rural sector, caused many locals to migrate or seek new economical activities by the 1960s.

Currently, Andacollo serves as the administration seat of the Minas Department and the service center for the surrounding rural communities.

== Geography ==
Andacollo is located in the joint of the Varvaco river and the Líleo river that form the upper Neuquén River in a valley surrounded by the Wind Mountain Range, in north of the Neuquén Province. The general elevation is over 1,113 m (3,652 ft) above sea level and the climate is Mediterranean, semiarid and mild cold. The winds blowing from the north-west are predominant in the area, and the sporadic ones from the south and east usually bring cold weather.

The village accesses are the Provincial Route 43 from Chos Malal, or Provincial Routes 6 and 38 from the south. It is located 60 km (37 mi) from Chos Malal, 460 km (290 mi) from the province capital, Neuquén and 1,587 km (986 mi) from Buenos Aires.

== Demographics ==
The 2010 Argentine census registered a total of 2,653 inhabitants in the municipality, showing a slight rise in comparison to the 2,627 recorded in 2001. During the 20th century, the town population grew exponentially, going from 531 residents in 1970 to 1,250 in 1980 and on to 1,641 in 1991.

== Economy ==
Andacollo is the second-largest town in the north of the province after Chos Malal. While mining still had a key role in the town's economy, Andacollo became significant as a service center for the nearby rural population of the Minas Department. The main mineral extraction in the area is dedicated to gold, copper and granite. The main activities in the rural zone are the agriculture and the animal husbandry with species such as capra, ovis and cattle.

== Tourism and landmarks ==
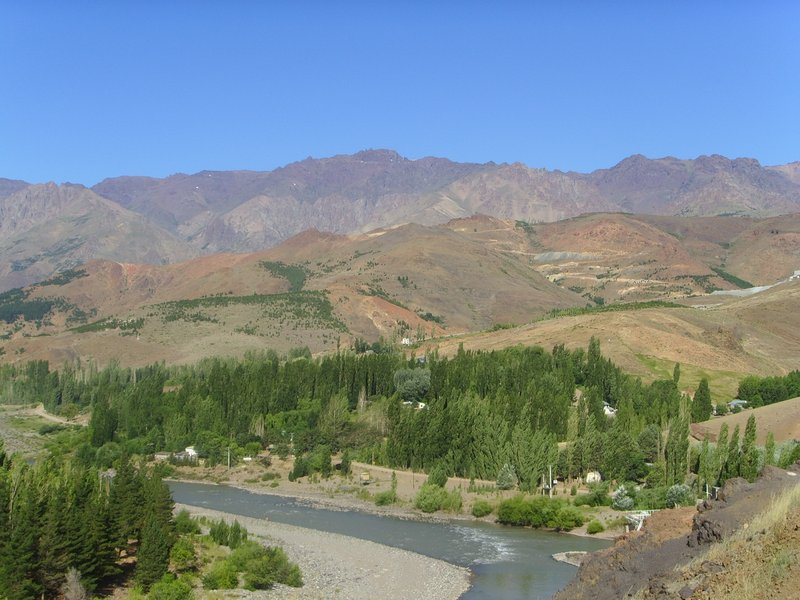
Neuquén River flowing near Andacollo

Though the town is not considered a typical tourist destination, it is a starting point for excursions into the different points of the Minas Department, such as the nearby town of Huinganco, nicknamed Neuquén's garden, or the Domuyo volcano 4,709 m (15,449 ft), popular for trekking as it is the highest peak in Patagonia. The Epulafquen lagoons are a popular spot for camping, hiking and recreational fishing. As in other parts of the province the most common fish species in the area is the rainbow trout.

Additionally to the natural attractions, Andacollo offers a view into the small-town life in the north of the province. The miners' bar, which used to be a meeting point for the local miners until 1990, remains almost in its original shape since the 1960s. The construction, made of stone, adobe and a carton roof is officially a part of the municipality's cultural patrimony and is a testimony to its mining past. Cultural events take place regularly at the amphitheater on Jaime de Nevares street, as well as the craftsmen fair, where regional handmade products are sold.

== Notable people ==
- Darío Herrera, FIFA football referee.
