= Aguada San Roque =

- Municipality and village
- Location within Neuquén Province Location within Argentina
- Coordinates: 37°59′59″S 68°55′22″W
- Country: Argentina
- Province: Neuquén Province
- Time zone: UTC−3 (ART)
- Postal code: Q8305

Aguada San Roque is a village and municipality in the Añelo Department of the Neuquén Province in southwestern Argentina.

== Location ==
Aguada San Roque is located 165 km from Neuquén city and 65 km from the town of Añelo and can be accessed via Provincial Route No. 7.

== Production ==
Aguada San Roque has 300 scattered inhabitants, who are engaged in rearing livestock, sheep and goats. They are associated with the local AFR (Rural Development Association).

== Administration ==
Aguada San Roque's administrative system of government functions under the development Commissions system. The development commission was created on August 27, 1999, its first president being Maria Rosa Zúñiga. The institution, which now has its own building, started in the Escuela 144.
