= El Huecú =

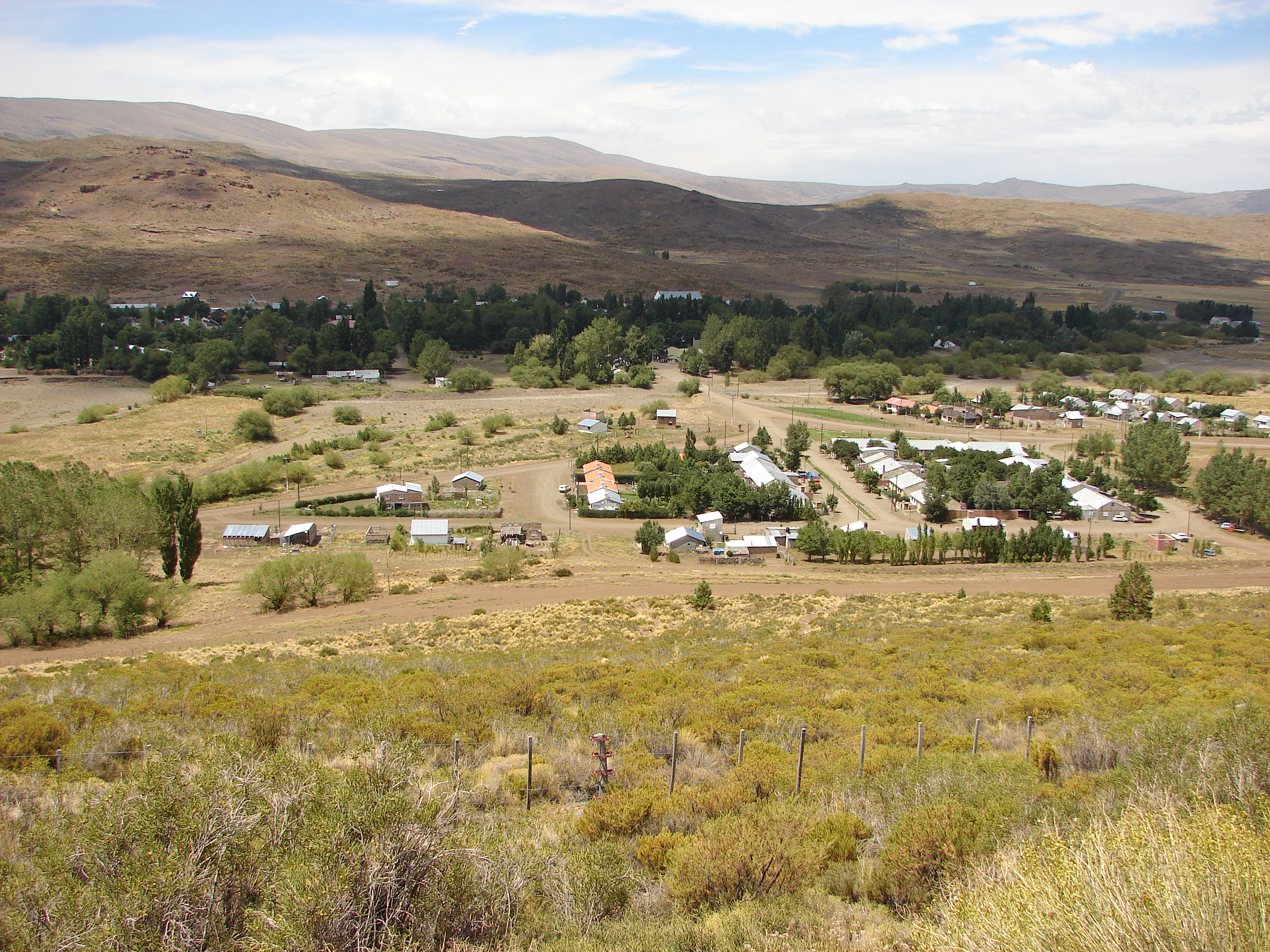
- El Huecú as of 2008

- Location within Neuquén Province Location within Argentina
- Coordinates: 37°37′S 70°35′W
- Country: Argentina
- Province: Neuquén Province
- Department: Ñorquín Department
- Founded: October 20, 1915

Government
  - Mayor: Rodolfo Canini
- Elevation: 1,569 m (5,148 ft)

Population (2010 census [INDEC])
  - Total: 1,391
- Time zone: UTC−3 (ART)
- CPA Base: Q 8349
- Area code: +54 02948
- Climate: Csb

El Huecú is a third category municipality and capital of the Ñorquín Department, on Provincial Road 4, in the north of the Argentine province of Neuquén.

It was founded in 1940. Because of the importance of goat breeding to its economy, it annually hosts the Festival of the Shepherd.

== History ==
The former city of Ñorquín was initially the capital of the department and had a population of more than 1,000 inhabitants. The first municipal election took place in 1886. Its population gradually moved to El Huecú because the previous capital was located on private property.

The establishment of El Huecú was authorized on September 2, 1938 by national decree 11392. In 1940, the Argentine Executive Power designated El Huecú as the new department capital, but it was officially founded on February 1, 1940. The municipality was built in 1973 and it received its third-category status, which it still holds, on 11 November 1976.

El Huecú is one of the northern Neuquen's municipalities that has a participative budget. Since 2004, the Mapuche people are recognized as original inhabitants of the region. In 2003, the lonko Carlos Maripal became the first non-elected member of the Mapuche community in the province to occupy a position at a local legislature.

== Etymology ==
The municipality's name comes from the Mapudungun, meaning evil genius. The word was used by the Mapuche people to refer to the bunchgrass Vulpia octoflora.

== Geography ==
El Huecú is the capital of the Ñorquin Department, in the northwest of the Province. It is located 370 kilometers from Neuquén and 90 kilometers from Chos Malal, on Provincial Road 4. It lies on a wide valley shaped by the El Huecú creek and other environmental factors, surrounded by the Mandolegue the Trocomán ranges. Its elevation is 1,200 m above sea level.

Bush vegetation of a semi-desert area can be found throughout the region. Pine forests have been introduced near the town. The fauna includes species such as the ostrich, guanaco, mountain lions, foxes and rabbits. Bird species include the Andean condor, vulture and New World sparrow.

== Demographics ==
In 2016, it was estimated that 2,194 people lived in the area. As of the 2010 Argentine census, the population of El Huecú was 1,391, showing almost no change in comparison to 1,399 recorded in 2001. In 1970 the population was 255 people. The next censuses showed a total of 743 (1980) and 1,149 (1991) inhabitants, respectively.

It is estimated that about 40% of the local population is of Mapuche descent. A large part of the locals are employed in the public sector, while some work for private enterprises that belong mainly to the service sector.

== Festival of the Shepherd ==
The goat breeding represents a major role in the local economy. El Huecú annually hosts the Festivity of the Shepherd (Fiesta del Criancero in Spanish) in December, revering the local goat shepherds that still practice transhumance.
