= Guanaco (disambiguation) =

Guanaco is an animal similar to the llama.

Guanaco may also refer to:

- An informal term for residents of El Salvador
  - Guanaco hip hop, a style of music from El Salvador
- Guanaca language, also spelled Guanaco
- Guañacos, a village and municipality in Neuquén Province in southwestern Argentina

== See also ==
- Río Guanaco, a hamlet on Navarino Island in the Tierra del Fuego archipelago in southern Chile
