= Foundational Pyramid, Neuquén =

Neuquén Foundational Pyramid
- Monolito Fundacional de Neuquén
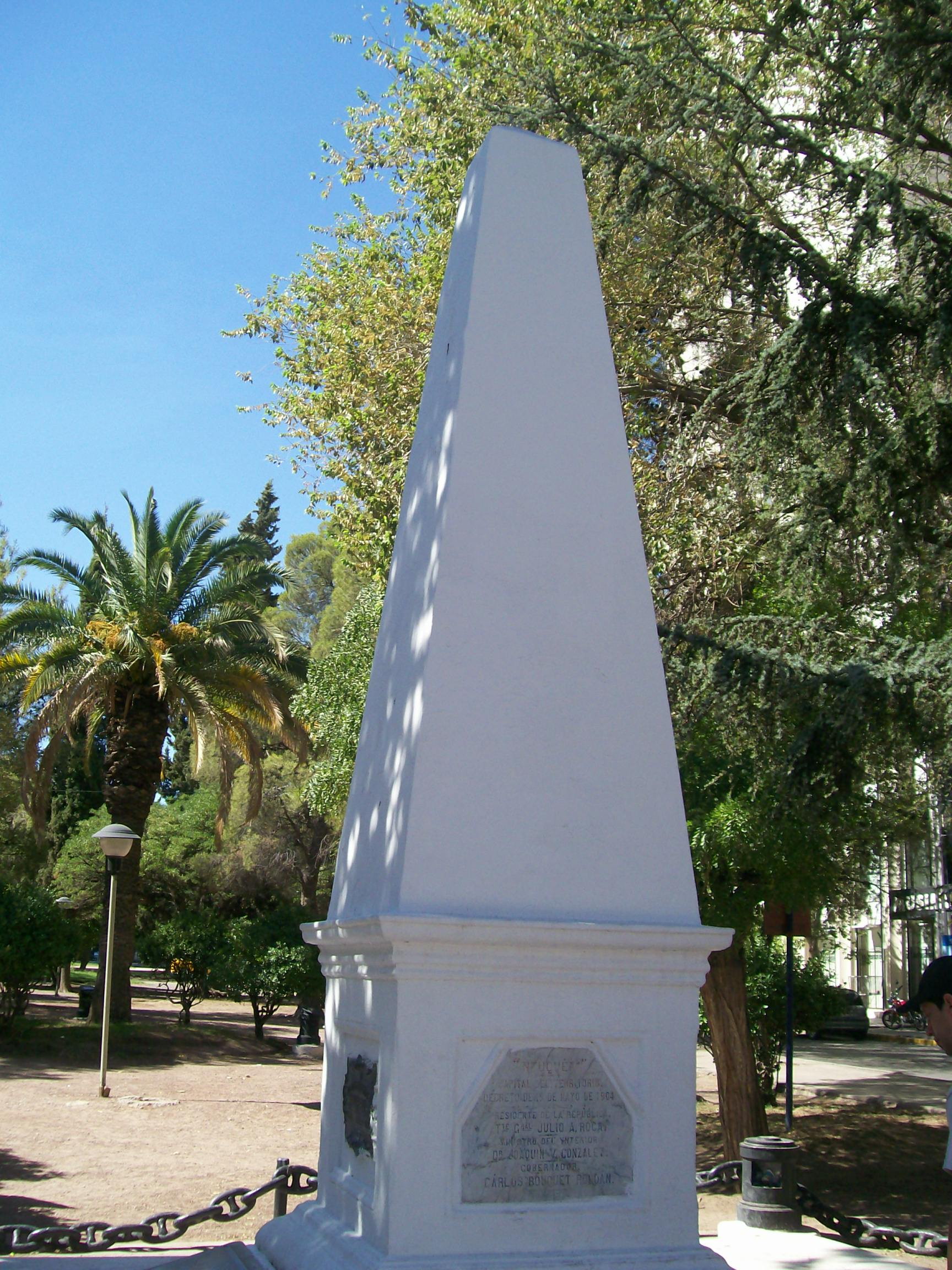
- Interactive map of Neuquén Foundational Pyramid
- Location: Bouquet Roldán square, Neuquén, Argentina
- Coordinates: 38°57′05.5″S 68°03′32.9″W
- Material: brick and cement
- Opening date: October 24, 1904
- Dedicated to: Neuquén's designation as the National Territory capital

The Neuquén Foundational Pyramid (Spanish: Monolito Fundacional de Neuquén), located in the city center of Neuquén, Argentina, is a monument built to commemorate the city's designation as the new National Territory Capital. Originally inaugurated in 1904, on the city foundation year, next to the "Chateau Gris", the National Territory Government building, it was moved to its current location, some meters to the north in 1954.

Being one of the first monuments erected in the city, the pyramid is preserved as a significant historic landmark, which is depicted on its coat of arms.

== History and construction ==
The first stone of the monument was set on the city foundation date, September 12, 1904 to celebrate its designation as the National Territory capital, replacing Chos Malal, which had been from 1887 to the date. The construction, made out of bricks and cement, was finished in October of the same year through the law 4523 from the national executive branch. It was originally located next to the "Chateau Gris", which was a two-storey wooden building in swiss style, which served as the town hall and National Territory administration building.

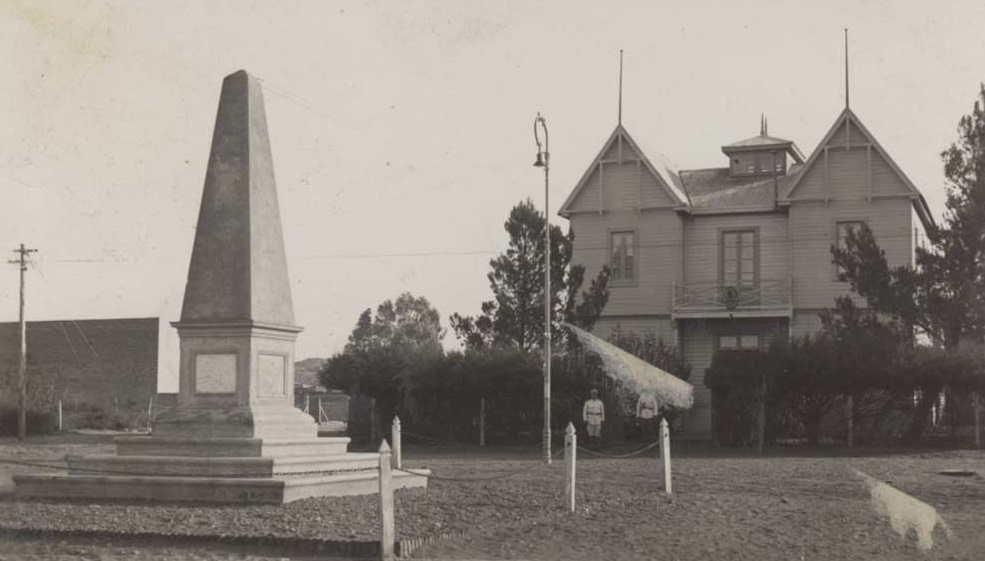
View on the pyramid and the Chateau Gris, before 1953

The monument stayed on its initial location until 1950, when the Chateau Gris was demolished. In 1954, it was inaugurated the San Martín Monument, placed where the pyramid was previously located. The city government decided to move the pyramid some meters to the north of the San Martín Monument, on one of the squares on the current Argentina Avenue (named Eva Perón Avenue at the time), on the grounds of the former Chateau Gris. During the relocation, a wooden box containing mostly illegible historical papers from the National Territory government was found under the original foundations.

== Significance in local culture ==
Located on the Bouquet Roldán square, at the very city center, the pyramid remains one of the main historical monuments of Neuquén, being depicted in the city coat of arms. It is also used among others as ceremony place on the city anniversary day and included in different touristic circuits. Due to its proximity to the San Martín Monument, which is considered a meeting point for the locals, it gets crowded at times of demonstrations, parades and other social gatherings.
