= San Patricio del Chañar =

- Town
- Location within Neuquén Province Location within Argentina
- Coordinates: 39°4′26″S 68°35′42″W
- Country: Argentina
- Province: Neuquén
- Department: Añelo

Government
  - Mayor: Alfredo Rodríguez (MPN)
- Elevation: 260 m (850 ft)

Population (2001)
  - Total: 5,063
- Time zone: UTC−3 (ART)
- CPA base: Q8305
- Dialing code: +54 0299
- Climate: BWk

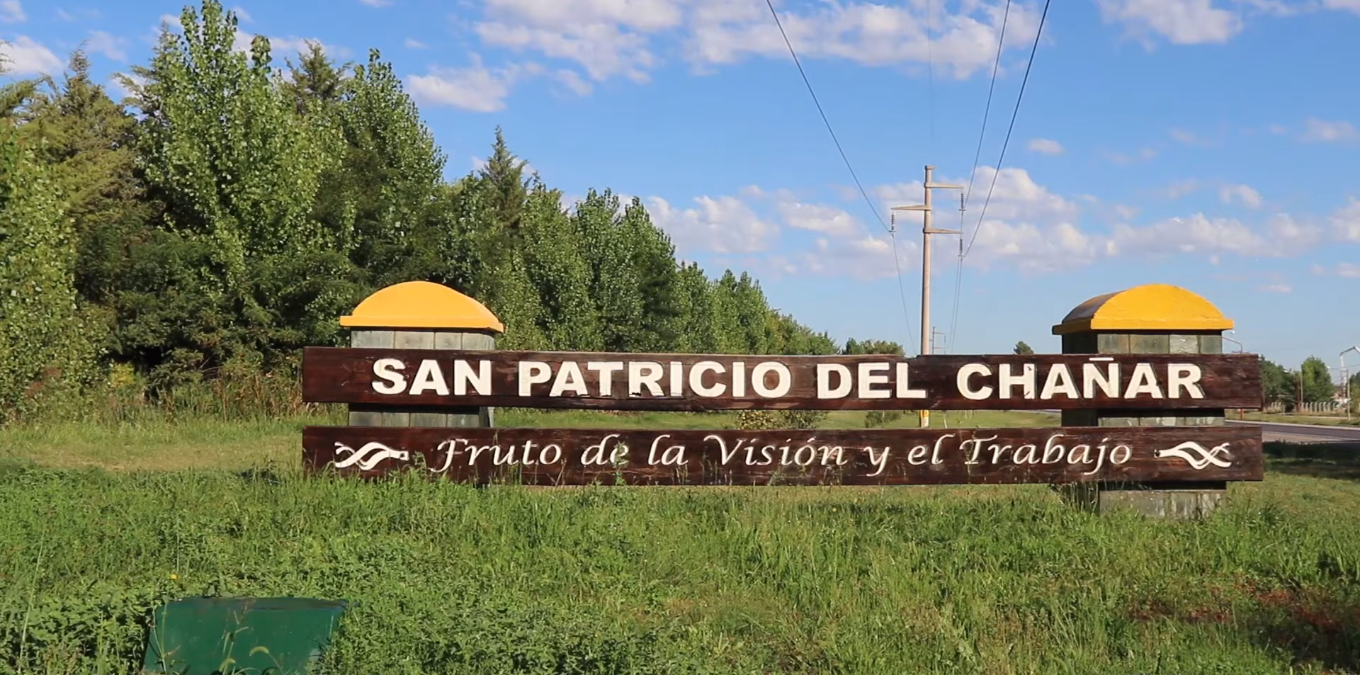

San Patricio del Chañar is a town located in Añelo Department, in Neuquén Province, Argentina.

== Economy ==
In San Patricio del Chañar agriculture is one of the most important activities. The main crop is grapes, used for the production of wine, a new business for the area and the province.

=== Energy sources ===
The town is provided with electric energy by a small dam located in the area.

== Culture ==
The word Chañar comes from the Quechuan language name for a kind of bush (chical in Spanish).
