= Rincón de Los Sauces =

Rincón de los Sauces
- Location within Neuquén Province Location within Argentina
- Coordinates: 37°23′S 68°55′W
- Country: Argentina
- Province: Neuquén Province
- Department: Pehuenches Department
- Founded: December 20, 1970

Government
  - Mayor: Diego Omar Rueda
- Elevation: 974 m (3,196 ft)

Population (2010 census [INDEC])
  - Total: 19,398
- Time zone: UTC−3 (ART)
- CPA Base: Q 8319
- Area code: +54 0299
- Climate: BWk

Rincón de los Sauces (English: Place of the willows) is a first category municipality and the capital of Pehuenches Department in Neuquén Province, Argentina.

== History ==
The area was first populated by settlers around the end of the 19th and the start of the 20th century until a flood of the Barrancas River caused the destruction of several buildings and a consequent population decline. After the flood, the main economic activity in the zone was based on cattle farming. YPF, then the state oil concern, discovered petroleum under Puesto Hernández in 1965, and subsequently, the population grew rapidly. Officially chartered on December 20, 1970, the town is named for the willow trees (sauce) that abound in the region. Its name, roughly translated, means Willows' Corner.

== Economy ==
The town has been declared the National Energy Capital due to its having 50% of the proven reserves of oil and natural gas in Argentina. The town is served by a regional airport.
