= Añelo =

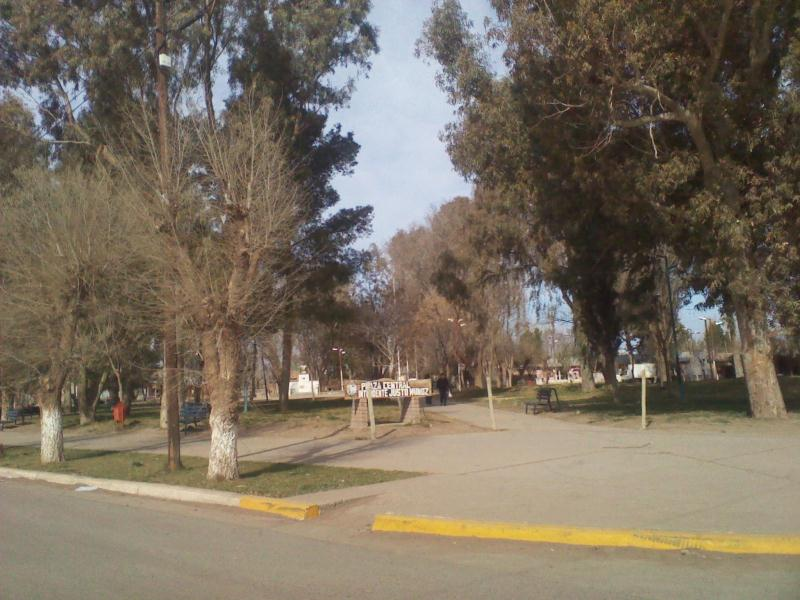
- Plaza Central en Añelo Provincia del Neuquen

- Location within Neuquén Province Location within Argentina
- Coordinates: 38°21′S 68°46′W
- Country: Argentina
- Province: Neuquén Province
- Department: Añelo Department
- Founded: October 20, 1915

Government
  - Intendant: Fernando Rodrigo Banderet (Comunidad)
- Elevation: 396 m (1,299 ft)

Population (2001 census [INDEC])
  - Total: 1,742
- Time zone: UTC−3 (ART)
- CPA Base: Q 8305
- Area code: +54 0299
- Climate: BWk
- Website: Añelo Municipality

Añelo is the second category municipality located in the Añelo Department in Neuquén Province, Argentina.

== Economy ==
The economy of Añelo is based on agriculture. One of the most important crops are grapes as in the near town of San Patricio del Chañar lately the production is dedicated to wine production, a new business in the zone. Añelo and the near towns are provided electricity by Cerros Colorados Complex a dam located few kilometers from the town.

== Culture ==
The Museo del Sitio, a museum that exhibits Mapuche traditions, is located near the city.
