= Villa Curí Leuvú =

- Municipality and village
- Location within Neuquén Province Location within Argentina
- Coordinates: 37°07′48″S 70°23′53″W
- Country: Argentina
- Province: Neuquén Province
- Time zone: UTC−3 (ART)

Villa Curí Leuvú is a village and municipality in Neuquén Province in southwestern Argentina.
