= San Martín Monument, Neuquén =

General San Martín Monument
- Monumento al General San Martín
- Interactive map of General San Martín Monument
- Location: Neuquén, Argentina
- Coordinates: 39°57′07.0″S 68°03′32.9″W
- Designer: José Antonio Alonso
- Beginning date: 1953
- Completion date: September 1954
- Opening date: September 12, 1954
- Dedicated to: José de San Martín

The General San Martín Monument (Spanish: Monumento al General San Martín), located in the city center of Neuquén, Argentina, is a memorial built to commemorate Argentinian general José de San Martín. The monument is constituted by a bronx-made equestrian statue of San Martín, mounted on a pedestal.

After a statue of San Martín was commissioned by Argentina to be placed in the city of Buenos Aires, several provinces of the country requested replicas to be placed on their capital cities. In 1950, the city of Neuquén created a commission to erect the city's monument. The commission resolved to locate the statue on the city center, and hired an Italian company to build the pedestal.

The monument was inaugurated on the city's 50th anniversary, September 12, 1954. In 2014, after repeated acts of vandalism, the structure of the monument was reformed. A waterfall was added to the four sides of the pedestal with a fountain on the bottom to prevent the memorial be painted.

== Background ==
In 1859, Chile commissioned for Santiago a statue to commemorate José de San Martín to French sculptor Louis-Joseph Daumas, who was specialized in equestrian figures. After becoming aware of the Chilean initiative, the Argentinian government commissioned the same year another statue to Daumas. It was placed on the current Plaza San Martín, in Buenos Aires, and was inaugurated in 1862. Upon the request of different provinces, several replicas of the monument were built and sent from Buenos Aires.

== Construction ==
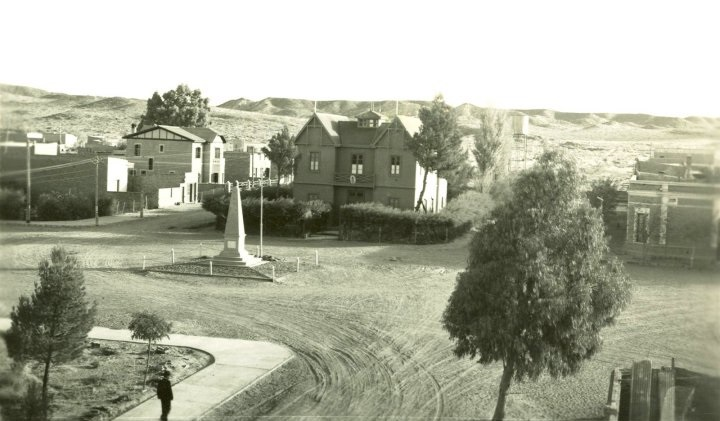
Before 1953, the foundational pyramid occupied the current location of the monument

In 1950, the city of Neuquén created the Executive Commission for Homages to General San Martin (Spanish: Comisión Ejecutiva de Homenajes al Libertador General San Martín) to erect a monument. Throughout July, the commission surveyed the possible locations in town. The commission suggested to place the monument on the grounds of the "Chateau Gris", the town hall building that was demolished on that year. In 1953 the commission settled to locate it on the roundabout of the intersections of Eva Perón Avenue (currently named Argentina Avenue) between Presidente Roca and Ministro Gonzáles streets. Selected for its location on the center of the city, at the time the roundabout hosted another monument, the Foundational Pyramid. The pyramid was moved to the former grounds of the old town hall. The construction works started soon after to inaugurate the San Martín Monument on September 12, 1954, the city's 50th anniversary.

The replica statue was sent from Buenos Aires via the Great Southern Railway (Spanish: Ferrocarril del Sur). The body of the bronx statue was built hollow, while the tail of the horse was filled to offset the weight of the structure. The base of the monument was built by the Italian company Falcone S.R.L, under the direction of hydraulics and civil engineer José Antonio Alonso. Alonso also completed the move of the Foundational Pyramid. The base was covered with white limestone brought from Zapala.

For its inauguration on September 12, 1954, the base of the monument was covered with Argentinian flags, since the works on the limestone were not finished and the internal bricks were visible. The ceremony started after midday, with the attendance of 15,000 citizens. The monument was rounded on a square formation by territorial authorities, members of the National Gendarmerie and the Armed Forces, and school students. It was blessed by Alfonso Butteler, Bishop of Neuquén-Mendoza. Following speeches from local authorities and a member of the commission, a military parade was organized. On the days that followed Falcone S.R.L completed the covering of the base, and removed the flags.

== Reforms ==
In 2009, the San Martinian Society requested to fence the monument after it was repeatedly vandalized. The request was dismissed by the city council, that considered that it would affect the aesthetics of the monument. In 2012, the municipal government of Neuquén made renewals on the monument. The Public Buildings and Transit Secretariat replaced the quicklime tiles of the roundabout for porphyr ones, that formed a sun-and-star shape. The National University of Comahue was in charge of the new illumination of the monument. On each of the twelve pointers of the star, metal cylinders were built to house lights that pointed toward the pedestal. Additional reflectors were placed on the top of the base to illuminate the statue.

In April 2013, after further vandalism, mayor Horacio Quiroga announced further reforms to the monument. The original cover limestone, affected by years of being painted and cleaned, was replaced by two layers of granite. The inner layer, was composed of natural granite, while the external was covered with flamed granite to avoid paint adhesion. Water pipes were built in the interior to produce a waterfall effect on the four sides of the pedestal, and a fountain on the base to recirculate the water. All the lights on the monument were replaced by LED lightning. The commemorative plaques were restored and placed under the waterfalls. The works started in February 2014, with an estimated cost of ARS1,7 million. The renewals were performed by the company H.G. Construcciones S.A, and finished in July 2014. The reinauguration of the monument was scheduled for August 17, 2014, the anniversary of San Martin's death.

== Local culture ==
Due to its location on the city center, the monument is regarded by the inhabitants of Neuquén as a meeting point. The location is often used for concentrations during demonstrations, parades and cultural events; including celebrations for the victories of Argentina's national football team, the "18A" cacerolazo, and pride parades.

To commemorate the 30th anniversary of the Argentinian return to democracy, plastic artist Amalia Pica painted the horse with white chalk, following the traditional depiction of San Martín mounting a white horse. Oscar Smoljan, director of Neuquén's branch of the Fine Arts Museum (Spanish: Museo Nacional de Bellas Artes), stated that the intervention intended to "debate the criteria (that Argentinians) have of their heroes".

== Gallery ==
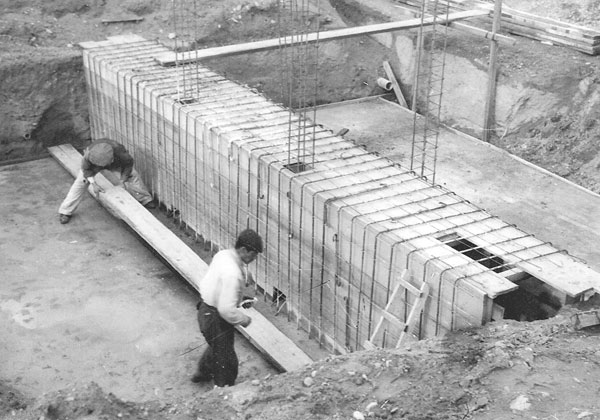
Beginning of the construction works, 1953

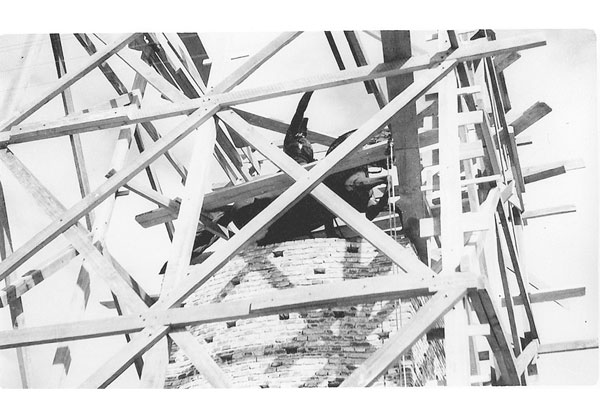
Scaffolding on top of the monument, 1954

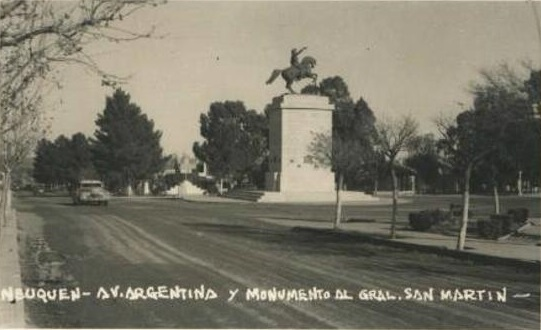
Postcard featuring the monument, 1955

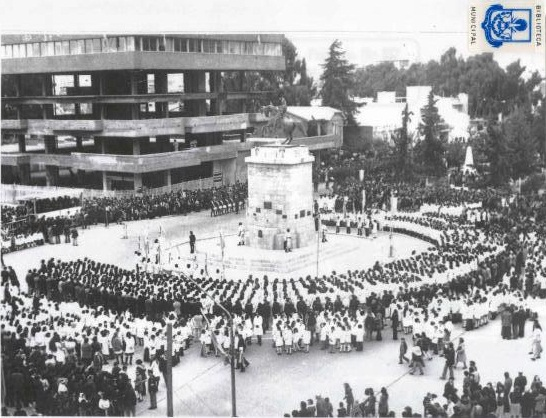
Commemoration of José de San Martín's death, 1976

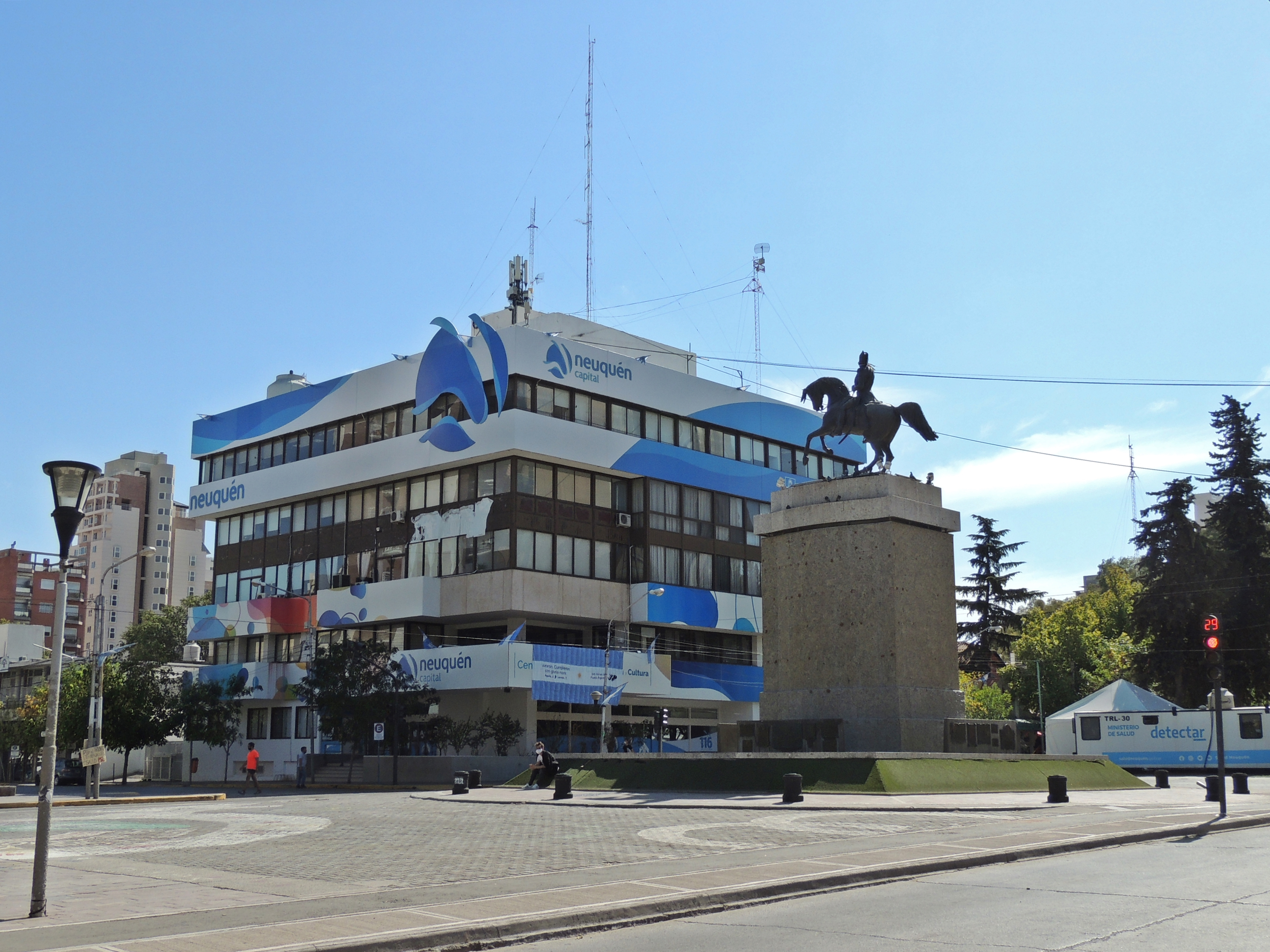
The monument in 2021
