= La Buitrera, Neuquén =

La Buitrera
- Municipality and village
- Location within Neuquén Province Location within Argentina
- Coordinates: 38°33′S 70°20′W
- Country: Argentina
- Province: Neuquén Province
- Time zone: UTC−3 (ART)
- Climate: Csb

La Buitrera (Neuquén) is a village and municipality in Neuquén Province in southwestern Argentina.
