= Domuyo =

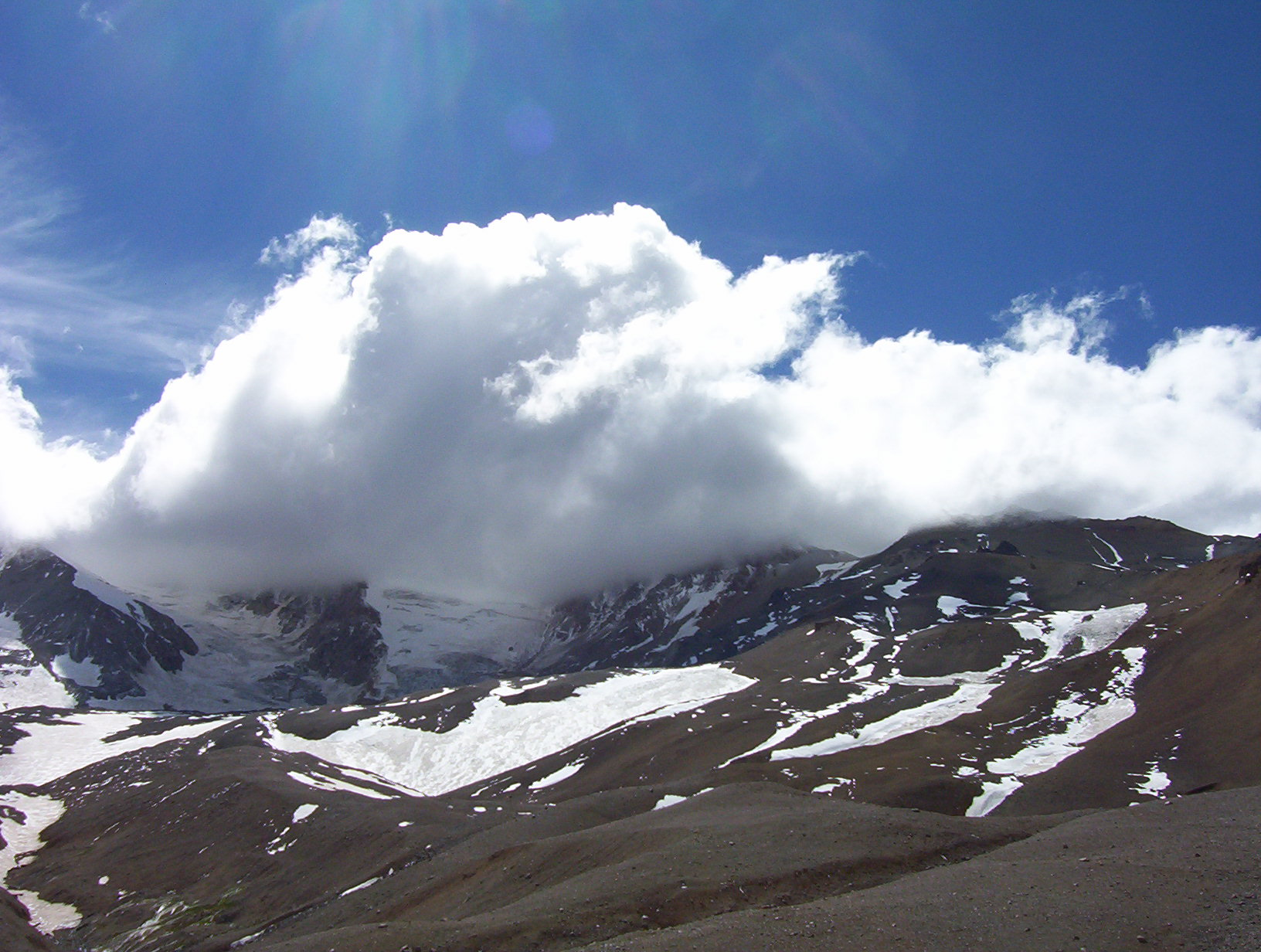
- Domuyo in winter conditions from near the high camp at 3,200m.

Highest point
- Elevation: 4,702 m (15,427 ft)
- Coordinates: 36°38′23″S 70°25′59″W

Naming
- English translation: To tremble and grumble
- Language of name: Mapuche

Geography
- Location within Argentina
- Location: Argentina
- Parent range: Andes

Geology
- Rock age: Holocene ?
- Mountain type: Stratovolcano
- Last eruption: Unknown

Climbing
- First ascent: (Argentina) Father Lino del Valle Carvajal, November 15, 1903

The Domuyo Volcano is a stratovolcano located in the Argentine province of Neuquén. With a height of 4,702 m (15,427 ft), it is the highest mountain in Patagonia and is sometimes called the "Roof of Patagonia" ("El Techo de la Patagonia" in Spanish).

The volcano has a large 15 kilometres (9 mi) wide caldera. At least 14 dacite lava domes are found within the caldera, with another five outside. Its slopes western contain many fumaroles, hot springs and geysers.

It names derives from the Mapuche meaning "To tremble and grumble", probably due to the geothermal activity of the volcano.

The volcano is accessible by the National Route 40 from Chos Malal, connecting with provincial route 43, passing by Andacollo.

== See also ==
- List of volcanoes in Argentina

== Sources ==
- González-Ferrán, Oscar (1995). Volcanes de Chile. Santiago, Chile: Instituto Geográfico Militar. p. 640 pp. ISBN 956-202-054-1. (in Spanish; also includes volcanoes of Argentina, Bolivia, and Peru)
- Biggar, John (2005). The Andes: A Guide for Climbers (3rd ed.). Andes Publishing (Scotland). p. 304 pp. ISBN 0-9536087-2-7.
