= Mari Menuco =

- Municipality and village
- Location within Neuquén Province Location within Argentina
- Coordinates: 38°32′24″S 68°33′00″W
- Country: Argentina
- Province: Neuquén Province
- Time zone: UTC−3 (ART)

Mari Menuco is a village and municipality in Neuquén Province in southwestern Argentina.
