= Octavio Pico =

- Municipality and village
- Location within Neuquén Province Location within Argentina
- Coordinates: 37°35′22″S 68°15′29″W
- Country: Argentina
- Province: Neuquén Province
- Time zone: UTC−3 (ART)
- Climate: BWk

Octavio Pico is a village and municipality in Neuquén Province in southwestern Argentina.
