= Auca Mahuida =

Volcano in Argentina

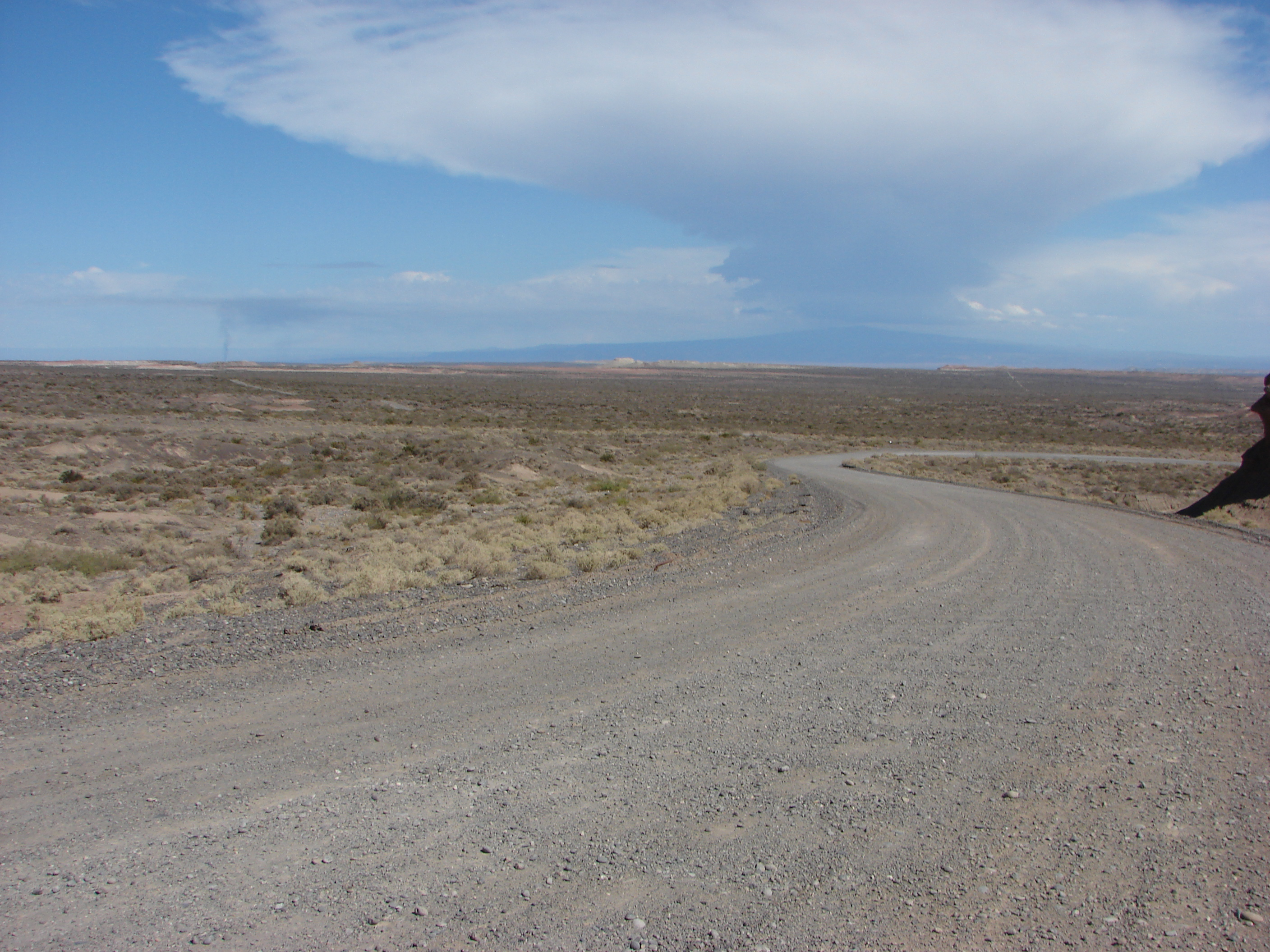

Highest point
- Elevation: 2,243 m (7,359 ft)
- Coordinates: 37.738°S 68.924°W

Geography
- Location within Argentina
- Location: Argentina, Neuquén Province
- Parent range: Andes

Auca Mahuida is a shield volcano in the Payenia Volcanic Province of Neuquén Province, Argentina. K–Ar dating of samples at the volcano indicated it formed between 1.8 and 1.0 million years ago, and is the only shield volcano in the province. The summit crater and andesitic volcanic plug are well-preserved.
