= Los Miches =

- Municipality and village
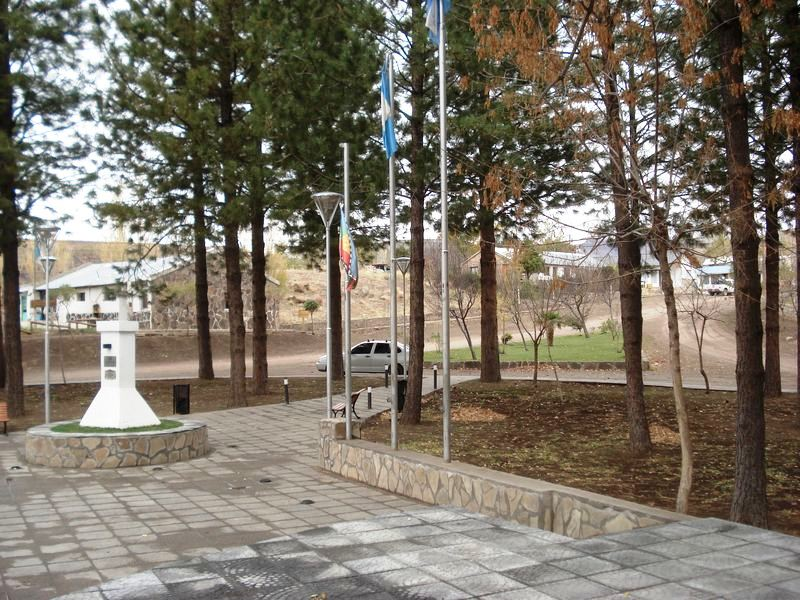
- Plaza in Los Miches

- Location within Neuquén Province Location within Argentina
- Coordinates: 37°14′S 70°52′W
- Country: Argentina
- Province: Neuquén Province
- Time zone: UTC−3 (ART)
- Climate: Csb

Los Miches is a village and municipality in Neuquén Province in southwestern Argentina.
