= Loncopué =

- Location within Neuquén Province Location within Argentina
- Coordinates: 38°04′S 70°37′W
- Country: Argentina
- Province: Neuquén Province
- Department: Loncopué Department
- Founded: October 20, 1915

Government
  - Mayor: Walter Fonseca
- Elevation: 935 m (3,068 ft)

Population (2001 census [INDEC])
  - Total: 4,266
- Time zone: UTC−3 (ART)
- CPA Base: Q8349
- Area code: +54 02948
- Climate: Csb
- Website: www.loncopue.gob.ar

Loncopué (Spanish pronunciation: [loŋkoˈpwe]) is a second category municipality and capital of the Loncopué Department located in the Neuquén Province, Argentina.

== History ==
Loncopué was established on October 20, 1915.

== Economy ==
The major economic activities are animal husbandry of goats and sheep, and tourism.
