= Chorriaca =

- Town
- Location within Neuquén Province Location within Argentina
- Coordinates: 37°54′S 70°8′W
- Country: Argentina
- Province: Neuquén
- Department: Loncopué

Government
  - Mayor: Mariano Kilapi (Neuquino People's Movement)

Area
  - Total: 140 km^{2} (54 sq mi)
- Elevation: 1,281 m (4,203 ft)

Population
  - Total: 180
  - Density: 1.3/km^{2} (3.3/sq mi)
- Time zone: UTC−3 (ART)
- CPA base: Q8351
- Dialing code: +54 02948

Chorriaca is a town located in the Loncopué Department, at east Neuquén Province, Argentina. The town is located in the km 2543 of the National Route 40.

== Population ==
After the 2001 national census, Chorriaca recorded 180 inhabitants.
