= Huinganco =

- Municipality and village
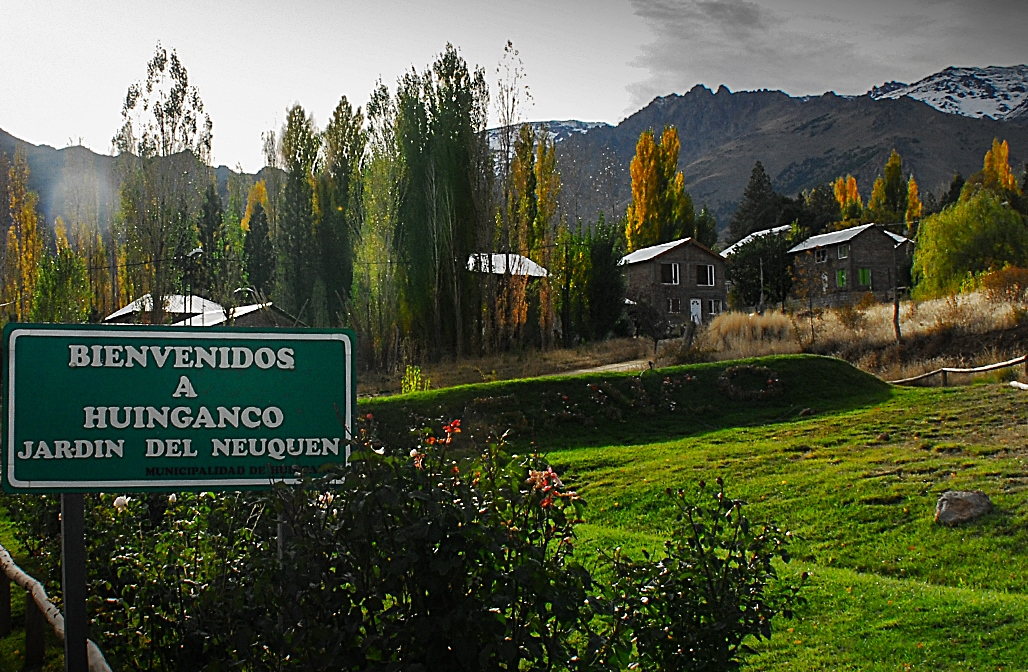
- Entrance to Huinganco
- Nickname: Neuquen's garden
- Location within Neuquén Province Location within Argentina
- Coordinates: 37°07′S 70°39′W
- Country: Argentina
- Province: Neuquén Province
- Elevation: 4,357 ft (1,328 m)
- Time zone: UTC−3 (ART)
- Postal code: 8353
- Area code: 02948
- Climate: Csb

Huinganco is a village and municipality in the Minas Department of the Neuquén Province in southwestern Argentina. It is located 470 km (290 mi) northwest of Neuquén city, the province capital. Situated on the valley of the Neuquén River on the foot of the Cordillera del Viento mountain range, the village is nicknamed the garden of the province because of its natural beauty.

== History ==
Huinganco is a Pehuenche language name. It is composed of two words: huingan, referring to the local vegetation of the schinus genus, and co, meaning water or stream. It can be translated as the "huingan creek".

The Pehuenche people settled the site of the current village between the 8th and 9th centuries, since its wetlands made it convenient to breed animals.

In 1879, the first Civil Authority of the Neuquén Territory was established in Charra Ruca, near Huinganco. The first settlers, who were mainly Chilean ranchers and farmers arrived some years later. In 1883, gold mining started in the region, attracting migration. The activity boomed between the 1920s and 1950s. The gold prices fell in the 1960s, affecting the town's economy. The lack of jobs caused a migration wave of young people to the Neuquén city area.

The village was officially founded in 1964. The local authorities were able to revive the economy by foresting the mountains of the Cordillera del Viento range and opening the plant nursery that would become Argentina's first communal forest.

== Geography ==
Huinganco lies on the left shore of the Neuquén River, on the foot of the Cordillera del Viento (Wind Mountain range). Various creeks, including Butalón Norte, Huingan Co and Manzano flow through the region. The landscape around the village is characterized by pine forests and steppes. The nearly located Corona mountain, at about 2,992 metres (9,816 ft) above sea level, considered one of the region's highlights, is the highest peak in the Cordillera del Viento.

== Economy ==
The local economy is mainly based on afforestation. The municipal plant nursery open in 1968 and more recent entreprises, such as the marmalade factory and fish farming also play an important role.

Nicknamed Neuquén's garden because of its forests, gardens and surrounding nature, tourism has also become an important source of income. It is a popular destination for trekking, hiking, horse riding and other ways to explore attractions in the Cordillera del Viento, such as the Huinganco lagoon and the Corona mountain.

== Population ==
The population experienced a small growth from 910 inhabitants in 2001 to 1,010 in 2010. By the time of the 1991 Argentine census, the population summed up a total of 743 people. Previous censuses registered 428 inhabitants (1980) and 285 inhabitants (1970).
