= Guañacos =

- Municipality and village
- Location within Neuquén Province Location within Argentina
- Coordinates: 37°17′S 70°45′W
- Country: Argentina
- Province: Neuquén Province
- Time zone: UTC−3 (ART)

Guañacos is a village and municipality in Neuquén Province in southwestern Argentina.
