= Pehuenches Department =

Coordinates: 37°23′25″S 68°55′31″W

Pehuenches
- Department
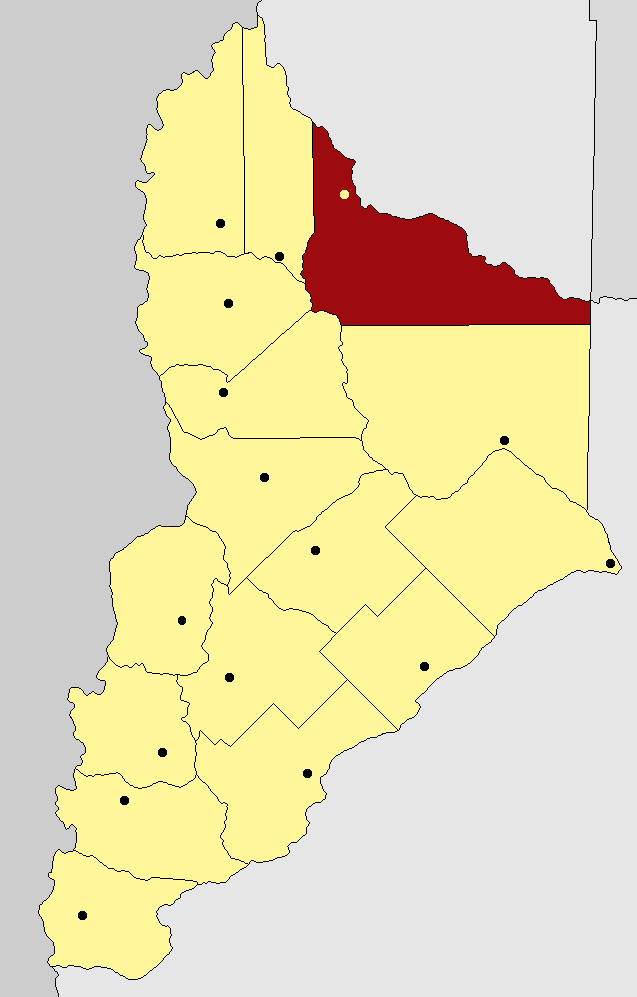
- Country: Argentina
- Province: Neuquén
- Capital: Rincón de los Sauces

Area
  - Total: 8,720 km^{2} (3,370 sq mi)

Population (2022)
  - Total: 29,753
  - Density: 3.41/km^{2} (8.84/sq mi)
- Important cities: Rincón de los Sauces: Auquinco; Barrancas; Buta Ranquil; Curaco; Octavio Pico; Rincon Colorado; Rincón de los Sauces; Chacayco; El Cruce; Las Cortaderas

Pehuenches is a department located in the northeast of Neuquén Province, Argentina.

== Geography ==
The department limits at north with Mendoza province, at northeast with La Pampa Province and at east with Rio Negro Province, Añelo Department at south, Loncopué Department at South-SouthWest, Picún Leufú Department in the southwest, Minas Department in the northwest.

== Population ==
According to the 2022 Argentine National Census, Pehuenches had a total population of 29,753 people and population density of 3.6 people per square kilometer.
