= Rahue River (Biobío) =

Tributary of Biobio river in Chile

Rahue River (otherwise known as the Rahueco) is a river of the Biobío Region of Chile.

== See also ==
- List of rivers of Chile
