= Loncopué Department =

Coordinates: 38°04′00″S 70°36′53″W

Loncopué
- Department
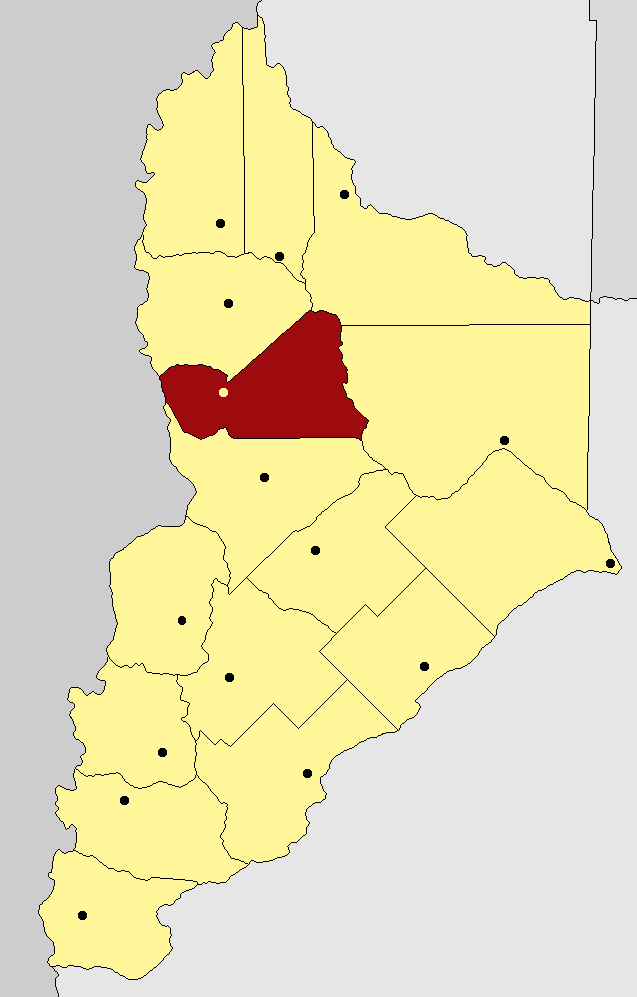
- Country: Argentina
- Province: Neuquén
- Capital: Loncopué

Area
  - Total: 5,506 km^{2} (2,126 sq mi)

Population (2022)
  - Total: 7,698
  - Density: 1.398/km^{2} (3.621/sq mi)
- Important cities: Loncopué: Cajón de Almanza; Chorriaca; Huitrin; Huncal; Pichaihue; Muchilinco; Quintuco; Huarenchenque

Loncopué is a department located in the west of Neuquén Province, Argentina.

The department is the site of an ongoing dispute between local Mapuche communities and Chinese mining interest. It is the first such conflict in Neuquén Province.

== Geography ==
The Department limits with Ñorquín Department at north, Pehuenches Department at north east, Confluencia Department at east, Picunches Department at south and Chile at east.
