= Chos Malal =

- City
- Location within Neuquén Province Location within Argentina
- Coordinates: 37°23′S 70°16′W
- Country: Argentina
- Province: Neuquén
- Department: Chos Malal Department
- Founded: 4 August 1887

Government
  - Mayor: Víctor Hugo Gutiérrez
- Elevation: 974 m (3,196 ft)

Population (2010 census [INDEC])
  - Total: 13,092
- Time zone: UTC−3 (ART)
- CPA Base: Q 8353
- Area code: +54 02948
- Climate: BSk
- Website: Chos Malal Municipality

Chos Malal is the capital city of the Chos Malal Department in Neuquén Province, Argentina.

== History ==
Chos Malal was founded on 4 August 1887 by Colonel José Olascoaga. It developed as a control point for policing the movement of cattle with a view to the suppression of cattle raiding.

The city was the capital of the Territorio del Neuquén until 1904 when the capital and administrative buildings were moved to Neuquén, capital city of the Confluencia Department, the arrival there of the railway having provided an economic boost which helped the city of Neuquén to grow very rapidly.

== Toponymy ==
The name Chos Malal derives from Mapuche words meaning "yellow corral" – from the distinctively yellow colour of the sedimentary flagstone rock that predominates in the hills surrounding the city.

== Geography ==
Chos Malal is located between the Neuquén River and Curi Leuvú river in the Cordillera del Viento. It is surrounded by conifer forests, mostly of Araucaria trees.

=== Climate ===
Chos Malal has a semi-arid climate (Köppen BSk), with cold winters and hot summers; during the winter there are regular snow storms.

Climate data for Chos Malal (1901–1960)
Month	Jan	Feb	Mar	Apr	May	Jun	Jul	Aug	Sep	Oct	Nov	Dec	Year
Record high °C (°F)	40.6 (105.1)	40.6 (105.1)	37.8 (100.0)	34.2 (93.6)	30.6 (87.1)	25.5 (77.9)	25.1 (77.2)	29.0 (84.2)	33.9 (93.0)	33.4 (92.1)	37.5 (99.5)	39.6 (103.3)	40.6 (105.1)
Mean daily maximum °C (°F)	31.1 (88.0)	30.3 (86.5)	27.4 (81.3)	22.1 (71.8)	17.0 (62.6)	13.2 (55.8)	12.8 (55.0)	15.0 (59.0)	18.2 (64.8)	22.8 (73.0)	26.5 (79.7)	29.2 (84.6)	22.1 (71.8)
Daily mean °C (°F)	21.3 (70.3)	20.2 (68.4)	17.1 (62.8)	12.6 (54.7)	9.6 (49.3)	6.6 (43.9)	6.1 (43.0)	7.4 (45.3)	9.7 (49.5)	13.7 (56.7)	17.3 (63.1)	20.0 (68.0)	13.5 (56.3)
Mean daily minimum °C (°F)	12.4 (54.3)	11.1 (52.0)	8.3 (46.9)	4.7 (40.5)	3.4 (38.1)	1.3 (34.3)	0.4 (32.7)	0.9 (33.6)	2.8 (37.0)	5.6 (42.1)	8.7 (47.7)	10.6 (51.1)	5.9 (42.6)
Record low °C (°F)	−1.9 (28.6)	2.0 (35.6)	−3.0 (26.6)	−9.1 (15.6)	−10.6 (12.9)	−12.5 (9.5)	−13.9 (7.0)	−9.6 (14.7)	−9.1 (15.6)	−4.5 (23.9)	−4.2 (24.4)	−0.6 (30.9)	−13.9 (7.0)
Average precipitation mm (inches)	10.0 (0.39)	10.3 (0.41)	11.0 (0.43)	17.1 (0.67)	42.2 (1.66)	36.3 (1.43)	32.6 (1.28)	30.2 (1.19)	14.6 (0.57)	13.0 (0.51)	10.4 (0.41)	9.4 (0.37)	237.1 (9.33)
Average relative humidity (%)	40.7	44.0	32.3	53.0	58.7	62.3	61.3	57.0	51.0	44.3	41.0	39.0	48.7
Source: Secretaria de Mineria

== Culture ==
The Jose Olascoaga historical museum located in the city has exhibits of many historical pieces of the Conquest of the Desert such as documents, soldier's equipment and Mapuche objects.
