= Neuquén Province =

Province of Argentina

Coordinates: 38°57′06″S 68°04′28″W

Neuquén
- Province
- Province of Neuquén; Provincia de Neuquén (Spanish)
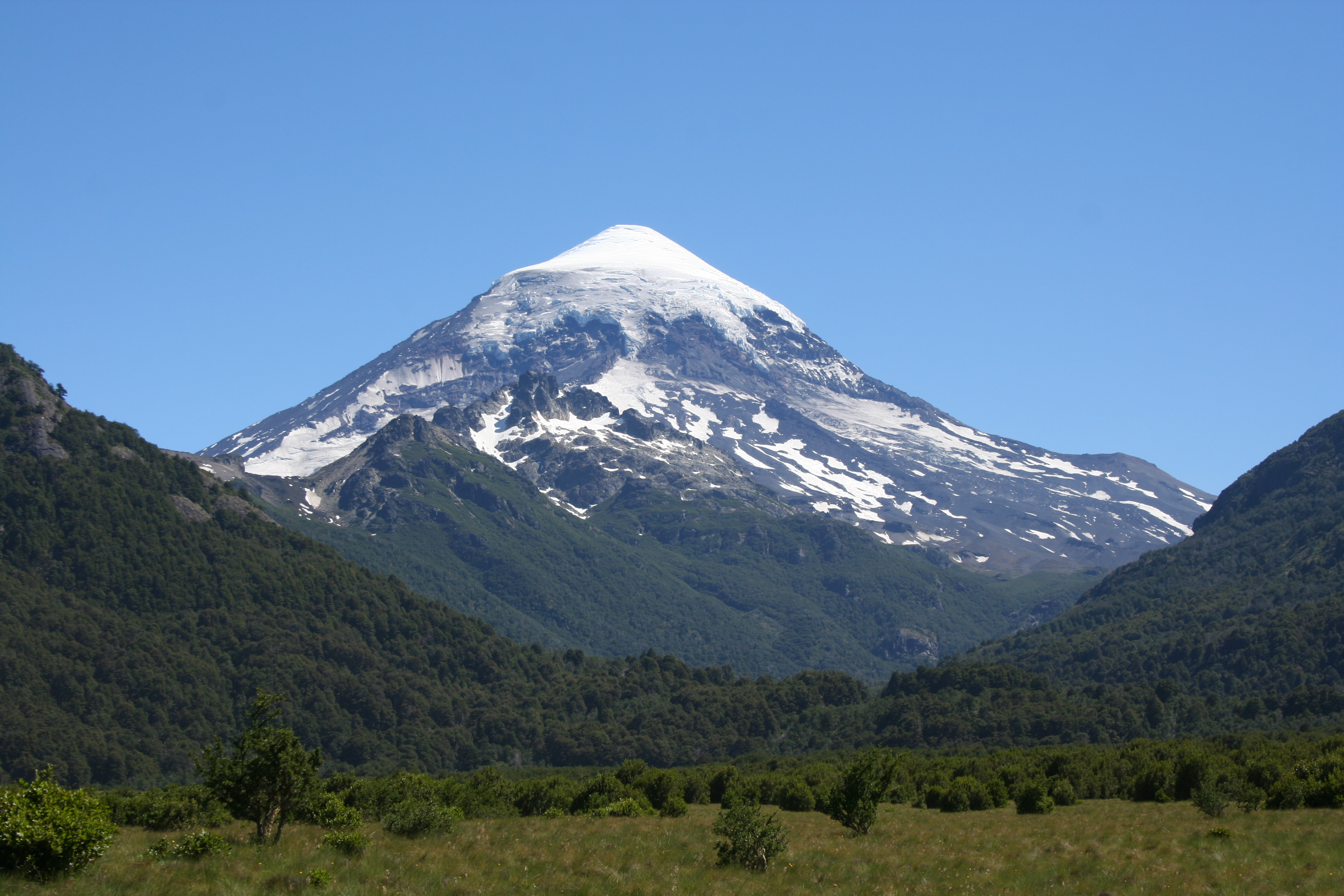
- The Lanín National Park

- Flag Coat of arms
- Motto: In God we Trust
- Country: Argentina
- Capital: Neuquén
- Divisions: 16 departments

Government
  - Governor: Rolando Figueroa
  - Vice Governor: Gloria Ruiz
  - Senators: Oscar Parrilli, Silvia Sapag, Lucila Crexell

Area
  - Total: 94,078 km^{2} (36,324 sq mi)

Population (2022 census)
  - Total: 710,814
  - Rank: 16th
  - Density: 7.5556/km^{2} (19.569/sq mi)
- Demonym: Neuquino

GDP
  - Total: US$ 9.4 billion
  - Per capita: US$ 13,800
- Time zone: UTC−3 (ART)
- ISO 3166 code: AR-Q
- HDI (2021): 0.832 very high (22nd)
- Website: neuquen.gov.ar

Neuquén (Spanish pronunciation: [newˈken]) is a province of Argentina, located in the west of the country, at the northern end of Patagonia. It borders Mendoza Province to the north, Río Negro Province to the southeast, and Chile to the west. It also meets La Pampa Province at its northeast corner.

== History ==
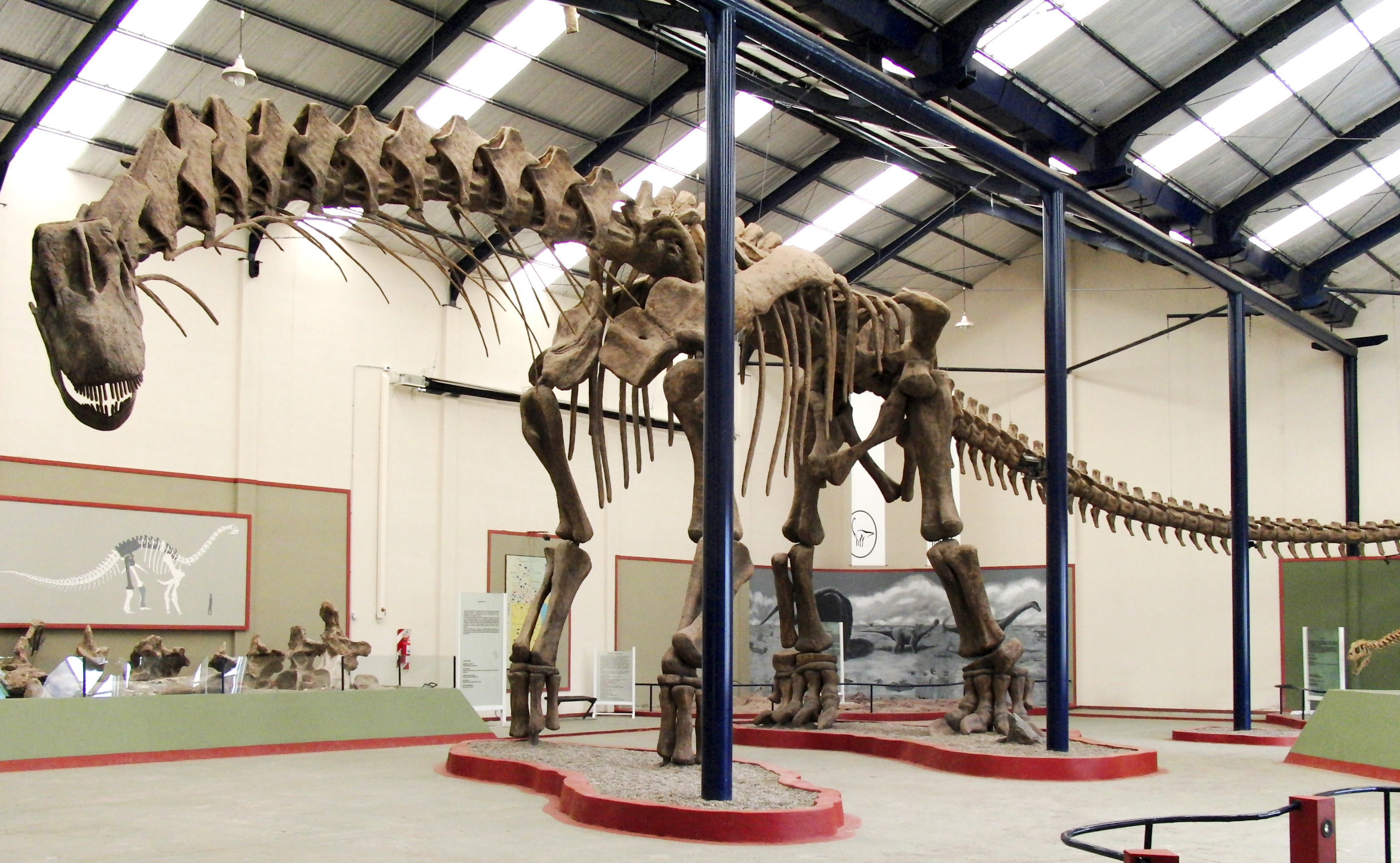
Reconstructed skeleton of the sauropod Argentinosaurus. It is among the largest known dinosaurs found in Neuquén.

The Neuquén Province receives its name from the Neuquén River. The term "Neuquén" derives from the Mapudungun (a local dialect of the Mapuche language) word "Nehuenken" meaning drafty, which the aborigines used for the river. The word (without the accentuation) is a palindrome.

Lácar Department in Neuquén Province has the southernmost known remains of maize before it was further diffused by the Inca Empire. Maize remains were found as far south as 40°19' S in Melinquina, with it being found inside pottery dated to 730 ±80 BP and 920 ±60 BP. This maize was probably brought across the Andes from Peru during the Inca Empire that also reached Chile.

Agriculture was practised in Pre-Hispanic Argentina as far south as southern Mendoza Province just north of Neuquén Province. Agriculture was at times practised beyond this limit in nearby areas of Patagonia but populations reverted at times to non-agricultural lifestyles. By the time of the Spanish arrival to the area (1550s) there is no record of agriculture being practised in northern Patagonia. The extensive Patagonian grasslands and an associated abundance of guanaco game may have contributed for the indigenous populations to favour a hunter-gathered lifestyle.

Inhabited by Tehuelches and Pehuenche at the time of European contact, the territory was initially explored by conquistadores coming from Chile. In 1670 Nicolás Mascardi, a Jesuit priest established in Chiloé Archipelago, founded the mission Nuestra Señora de Nahuel Huapi on the northern shores of Nahuel Huapi Lake. The Jesuit missions lasted few years and the last mission in Neuquén was destroyed in 1717. The suppression of the Society of Jesus in 1767 halted further missionary activity.

=== Royalist hideout ===
During the independence wars initiated by José de San Martín the local natives' rumored the imminent arrival of Spanish Crown Loyalist troops to Patagonia, either from the Chilean port of Chiloé coming from Alto Peru or by the Spanish settlements in the Patagonian Islands, were common among Mapuches indigenous peoples and of the northern Patagonia Pampas of Argentina. The last royalist armed group in what is today Argentina and Chile, the Pincheira brothers, moved from the vicinities of Chillán across the Andes into northern Neuquén as patriots consolidated control of the Spanish Crown colony of Capitania of Chile. The Pincheira brothers was a large mounted outlaw gang made of European Spanish, American Spanish, Mestizos and local indigenous peoples. This group was able to move to Patagonia thanks to its alliance with two indigenous tribes, the Ranqueles and the Boroanos. In Varvarco, far from the de facto territory of the Republic of Chile and the United Provinces, the Pincheira brothers established a permanent encampment with thousands of settlers. From this and other bases the Pincheira brothers led numerous raids into the countryside of the newly established republics.

In 1827 Chilean troops commanded by Jorge Beauchef retaliated by crossing the Andes and raided the royalist encampment. Chileans forced about three thousand people back across the Andes to repopulate Antuco.

=== Integration to Argentina (1875–1955) ===
The Neuquén area came under Argentine influence after explorer Perito Francisco Moreno made several trips to Patagonia and made accurate descriptions of the area in his book "Viaje al Pais de las Manzanas", reaching Nahuel Huapi lake in 1875. In 1879 Julio Argentino Roca started the Conquest of the Desert (Conquista del Desierto) that finally broke the aboriginal resistance. In 1884 Patagonia's political divisions were restructured and the Territory of Neuquén acquired its current boundaries. The capital of the province moved several times to Norquín (1884–85), Campana Mahuida (current Loncopué) (1885–1888), Chos Malal (1885–1901), and finally Confluencia currently known as Neuquén.

At the beginning of the 20th century the railway reached the city of Neuquén, and a new irrigation system was finished, facilitating the production and later transportation of crops. Petroleum was found in Plaza Huincul in 1918, giving Neuquén a new push forward.

Local politics have long been dominated by a single political party, the MPN or Movimiento Popular Neuquino founded by Elias Sapag, a prosperous businessman born in Lebanon.

Migrating to Argentina, the Sapag family arrived in Neuquén Territory around 1910 with the railroad, eventually making their home in Zapala, whose dry, fertile mountain valleys and orchards were reminiscent of their native Lebanon. Neuquén is rich in natural resources such as natural gas, petroleum, virgin forests and water resources suitable for electric power and tourism alike. These resources were formerly managed by the central National Government, which resulted in little local benefit at the time. Because of social unrest, Elias Sapag and two younger brothers, Felipe and Amado, started the MPN, an active political movement rooted in federalism and greater local rights over the territory and its resources.

=== Argentine Province (1955–present) ===
The territory was made a province on June 15, 1955, and its constitution promulgated on November 28, 1957. Felipe Sapag soon became politically prominent. Although he was elected governor in 1962 representing the Movimiento Popular Neuquino, a coup against progressive President Arturo Frondizi that March prevented Sapag from taking office. Eventually becoming governor in 1963-66 and 1973–76, he presided over one of Argentina's fastest-growing provinces. The national government established the University of Neuquén in 1964, later incorporated into the new National University of Comahue in 1971. Removed as governor following the violent March 1976 coup against Isabel Perón, Felipe Sapag was returned to office in 1983-87 and 1995-99. His emphasis on public works and political independence from Buenos Aires have helped him and his successors with the MPN win every province-wide election since. His brother Elias Sapag became senator in 1963-66, 1973–76 and from 1983 until his death in 1993, becoming the longest-serving senator in national history. The MPN also elected Governors Pedro Salvatori (1987–91), Jorge Sobisch (1991–95 and 1999–2007) and current Governor Jorge Sapag (2007–11).

== Geography ==
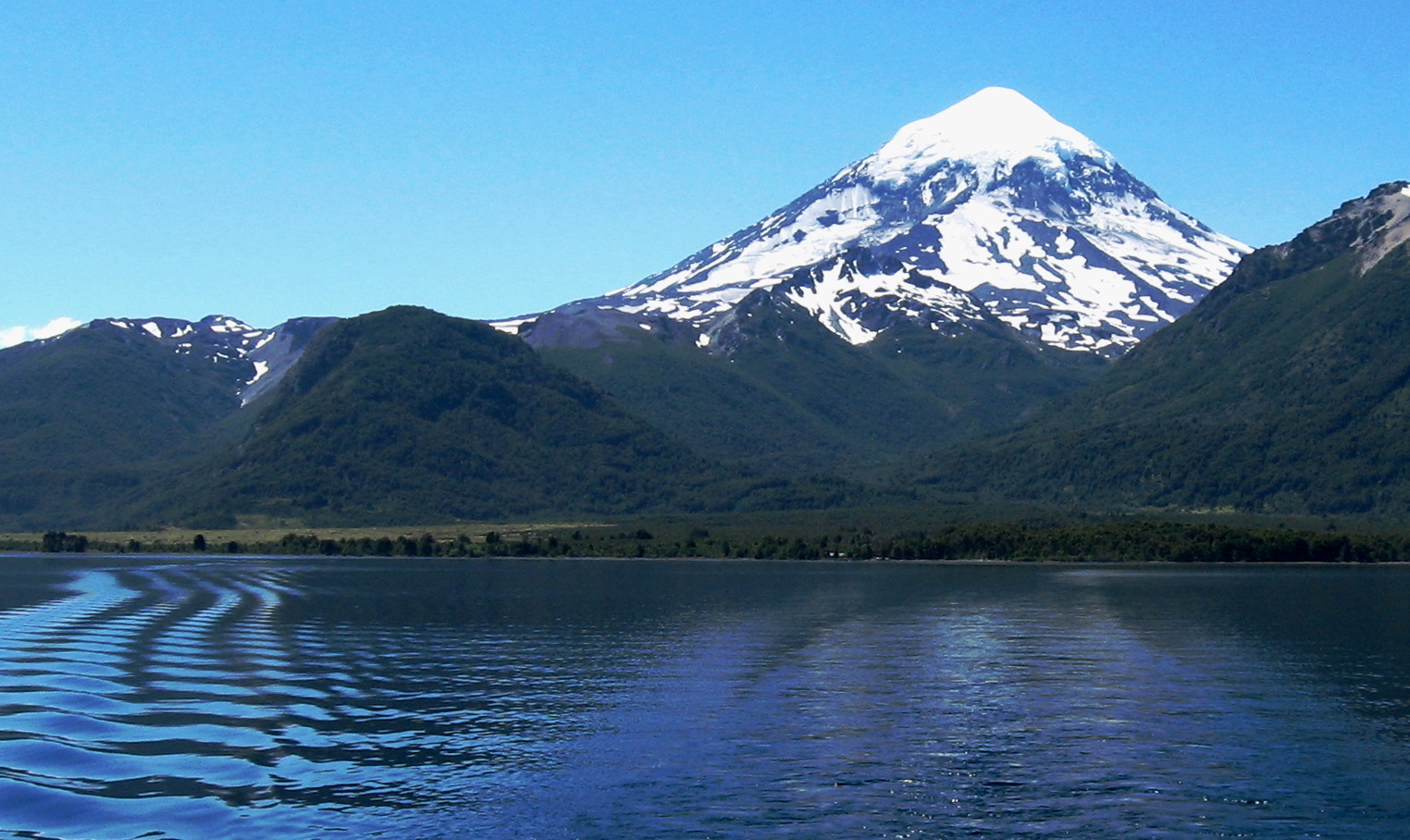
Lanín a large stratovolcano in Neuquén

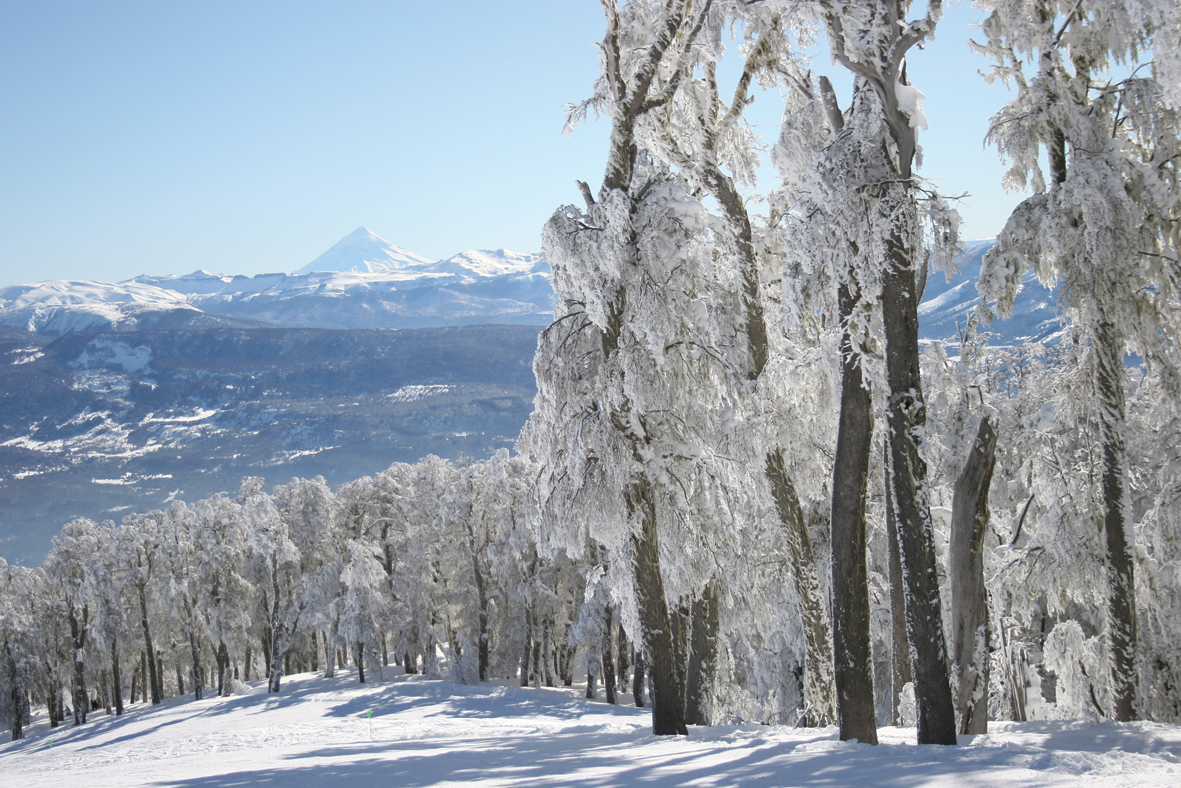
Cerro Chapelco.

The province's limits are the Colorado River to the northeast, separating it from the Mendoza Province, the Limay River to the southeast toward the Río Negro Province, and the Andes mountains to the west, separating it from Chile.

There are two main distinctive landscapes; the mountainous fertile valleys with forest on the west, and the arid plateau with fertile land only near the basins of the rivers on the east, mostly the Limay River and Neuquén River.

The lacustrine system includes other less-important rivers such as the Aluminé River, the Malleo, and the Picún Leufú River, and a series of lakes including Nahuel Huapi Lake (550 km^{2}), shared with Río Negro Province, Aluminé Lake (58 km^{2}), Lácar Lake (49 km^{2}), Huechulaufquen Lake (110 km^{2}), Lolog Lake (35 km^{2}), Traful, Hermoso, Quillén, Ñorquinco, Tromen and Falkner.

The province is home to the magnificent Arrayanes (Luma apiculata) forest at the Los Arrayanes National Park. Other National parks include Lanín National Park and the Lanín extinct volcano, the Nahuel Huapí National Park shared with Río Negro Province, and the Laguna Blanca National Park.

=== Climate ===
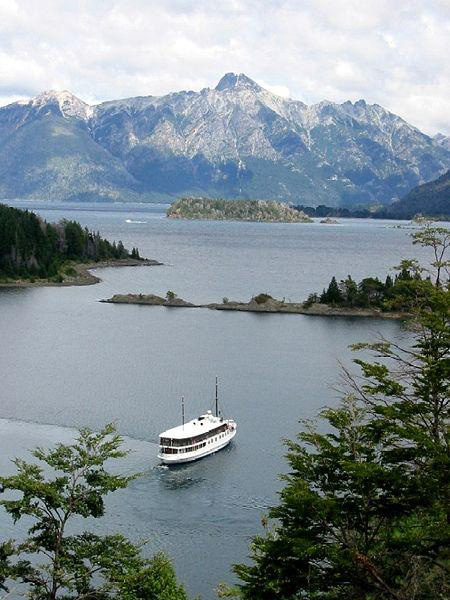
Victoria Island (Argentina)

Köppen climate map of Neuquén

Neuquén Province, being relatively far away from both the Atlantic coast and the Pacific ocean by the Andes mountains, which help to block most moisture coming from the Pacific Ocean results in a climate that is the most continental in Patagonia with large diurnal ranges.

==== Temperature ====
Mean temperatures are relatively cold for its latitude due to the high altitude. The warmest region is the eastern parts of the province where mean annual temperatures range from 13 to 15 °C (55.4 to 59.0 °F). The coldest areas are located in the Andean region where mean annual temperatures are below 5 °C (41.0 °F) or even below 0 °C (32.0 °F) at the highest peaks. During the summer months, mean December and January temperatures reach up to 24 °C (75.2 °F) in the eastern parts although during heat waves, temperatures can exceed 40 °C (104.0 °F). In July, the mean temperature ranges from 7 °C (44.6 °F) in the east to 5 °C (41.0 °F) in the west at the foothills of the Andes.

==== Humidity and precipitation ====
Humidity throughout the province varies significantly, depending on the location. The Andean region has a mean humidity exceeding 60% or even 70% due to lower temperatures while in the eastern parts, humidity is lower owing to higher temperatures. In all locations, humidity is significantly lower during the summer than in the winter.

Because the Andes block most of the moisture from the Pacific Ocean from coming in, causing it to release most of the precipitation on its western slopes, most of the province is dry, averaging less than 200 mm (7.9 in) a year. Northern and eastern parts of the province have mean annual precipitation exceeding 300 mm (12 in). In the western parts of the province, precipitation ranges from 200 to 1,000 mm (7.9 to 39.4 in) from the Andes to areas 100 km (62 mi) east of it. This area represents a transitional climate between the more arid east and the wetter climates to the west and has a Mediterranean like precipitation pattern, similar to central Chile. This is due to the seasonal migration of the South Pacific Anticyclone. Summer months are drier since the South Pacific high is more southwards, inhibiting rainfall. During the winter months, this high is displaced to the north, allowing frontal and low pressure systems from the west to come in, resulting in higher precipitation during this season. As such, most of the precipitation in this area falls during the winter months. In the southernmost parts of the province, some areas receive more than 3,000 mm (120 in) of precipitation a year.

==== Wind and sunshine ====
The winds in the province are moderately strong (slightly stronger in the south) and play a role in making most of the province arid by favoring evaporation. The predominant wind directions are from the west or southwest, which occur 40–50% of the time. In general, high altitude areas and flat areas receive stronger winds while summers tend to be windier than winters.

Cloud cover in the province varies widely with the eastern parts receiving less cloud cover than the Andean region which tends to be cloudier. Winters tend to be cloudier than summers with mean daily sunshine hours ranging from a high of 11 hours/day in January to a low of 3 hours in June.

== Demographics ==
Population pyramid of Neuquén in 2022.

According to the final results of the 2022 Argentine national census, the Province of Neuquén had 710,814 inhabitants.

== Economy ==
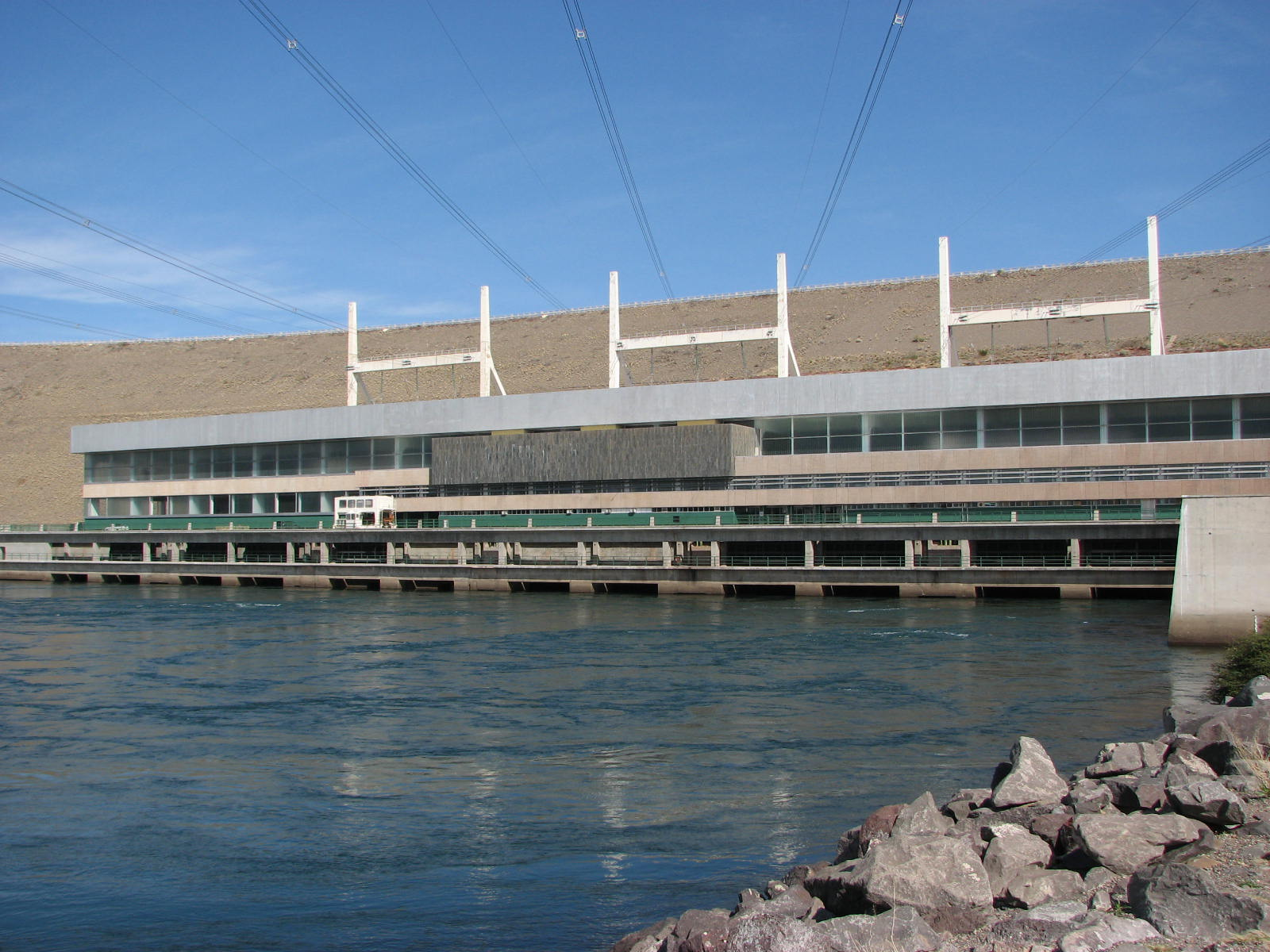
El Chocón Dam, the third most important in Argentina.

Neuquen is one of Argentina's most prosperous provinces, its estimated 47.648 billion Peso (about US$10.495 billion) economy in 2012, or, 80,566 pesos (US$17,744) per capita.

No province in Argentina, however, is as dependent on any one sector as is Neuquen's. Roughly half its output is accounted for by its mining and extractive sector, mainly on account of its massive gas and petroleum production, the most important in Argentina. That dependency is only likely to increase: development of the province's huge unconventional hydrocarbon reserves is beginning, above all in the Vaca Muerta formation.

The province generates a significant part of Patagonia's electric power through the hydroelectric plants of Piedra del Águila, El Chocón, Pichi Picún Leufú, Planicie Banderita (in the Cerros Colorados Complex), and Alicurá. The town of Arroyito hosts the only heavy water plant in the country.

Another important activity is the production of apples, pears, peaches and others, specially in the Alto Valle area, shared with Río Negro.

The piquetero movement (organizations of unemployed workers) was born in Neuquén in the 1990s, during the presidency of Carlos Menem.

== Tourism ==
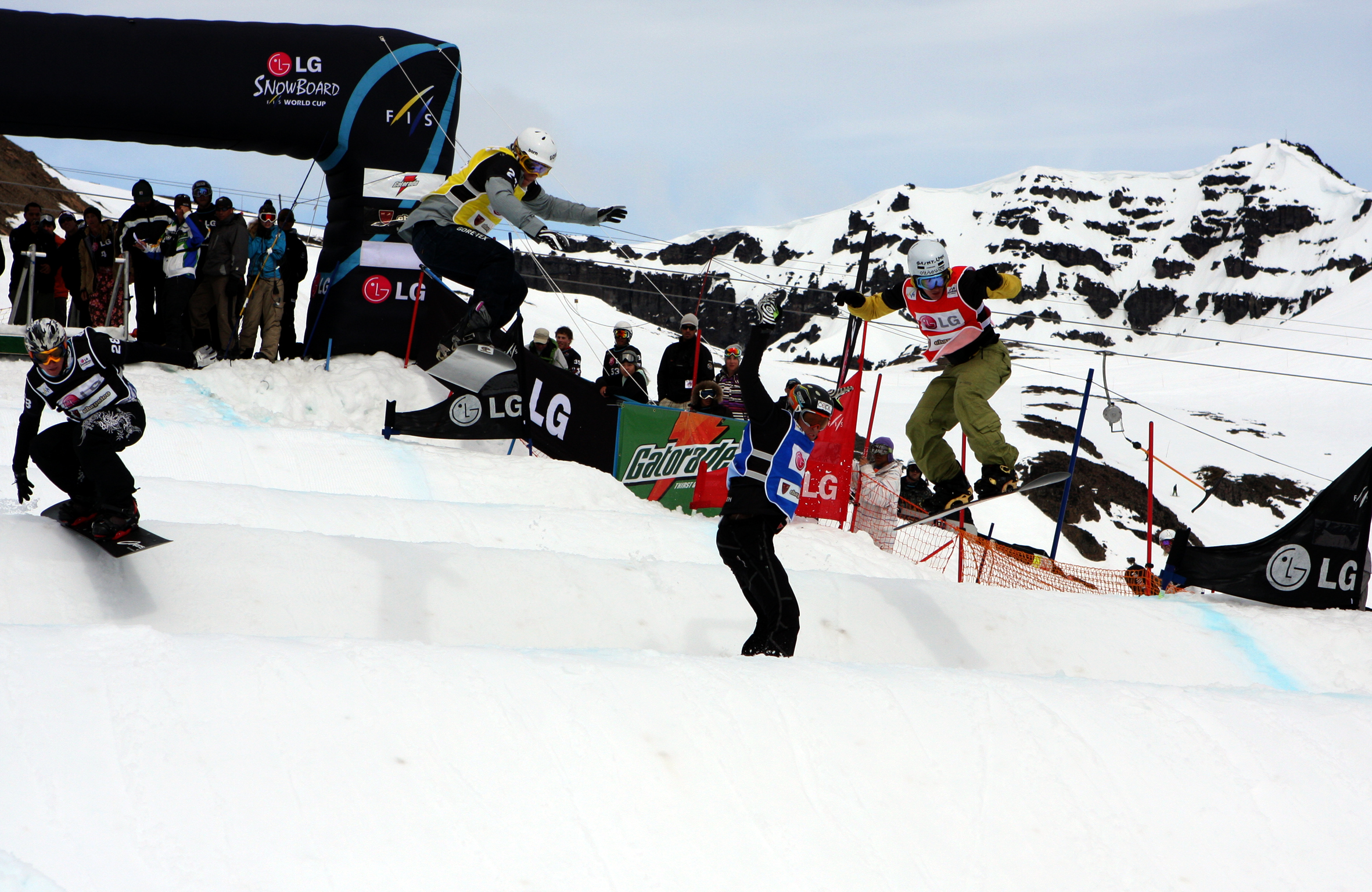
A snowboarder in San Martín de los Andes.

See also Tourism in Argentina article

A destination of many Argentines and foreigners, the province has a number of year-round attractions, including:

- San Martín de los Andes
- Villa La Angostura
- Los Arrayanes National Park
- Lanín National Park
- Nahuel Huapí National Park
- Laguna Blanca National Park
- Copahue hot baths.

During the winter, there are the ski resorts in Chapelco, Cerro Bayo and Caviahue.

Many hike or fish, mainly for river trout, the lake district region of Southwestern Neuquén that stretches into Río Negro and Chubut Provinces.

There were a number of dinosaurs in the area, of which the bones of a 95 million years old Argentinosaurus are in display at the Carmen Funes Museum in Plaza Huincul.

== Government ==
The provincial government is divided into the usual three branches: the executive, headed by a popularly elected governor, who appoint the cabinet; the legislative; and the judiciary, headed by the Supreme Court.

The Constitution of Neuquén Province forms the formal law of the province.

In Argentina, the most important law enforcement organization is the Argentine Federal Police but the additional work is carried out by the Neuquén Provincial Police.

== Political division ==
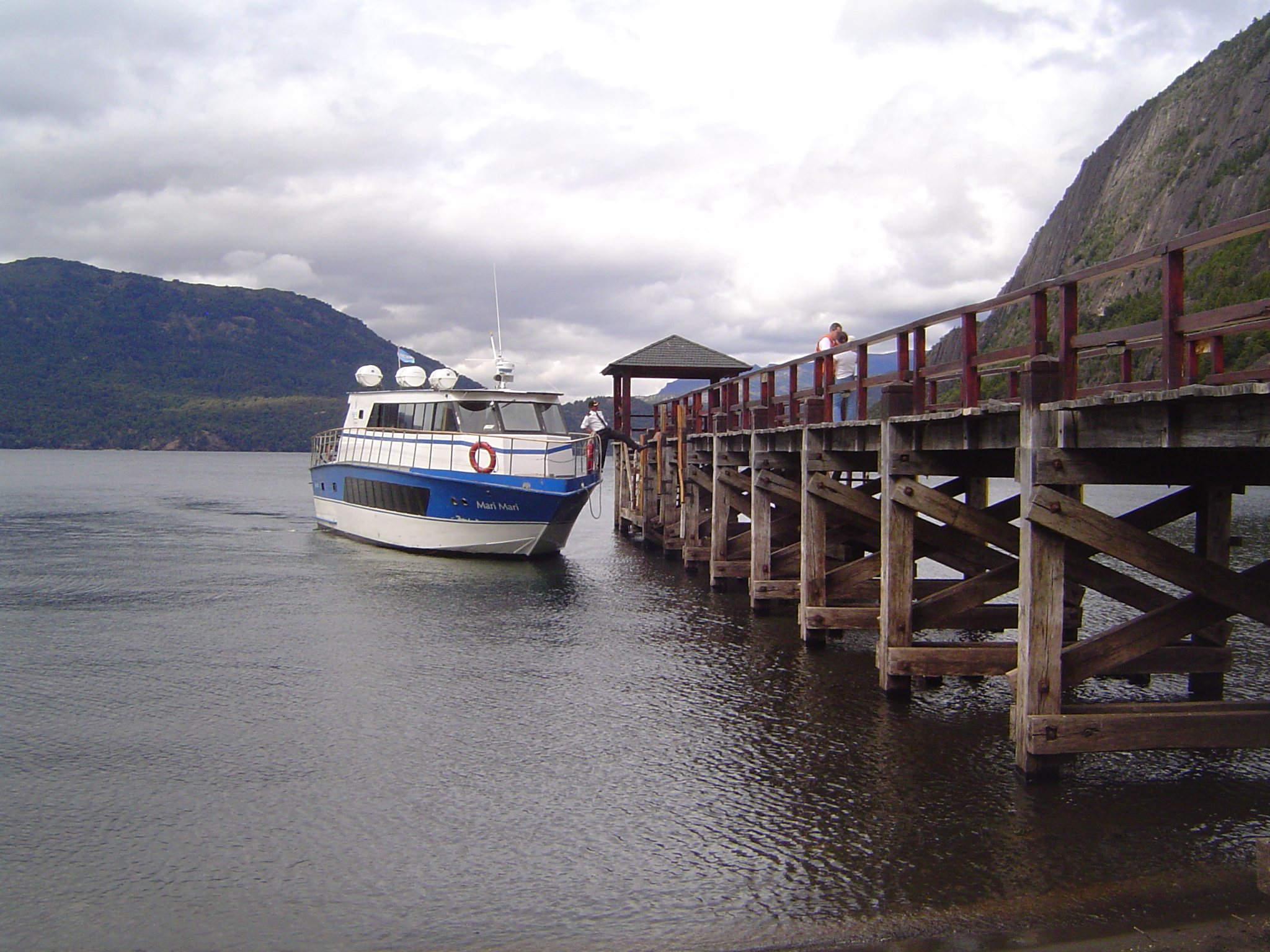
Quina Quina dock.

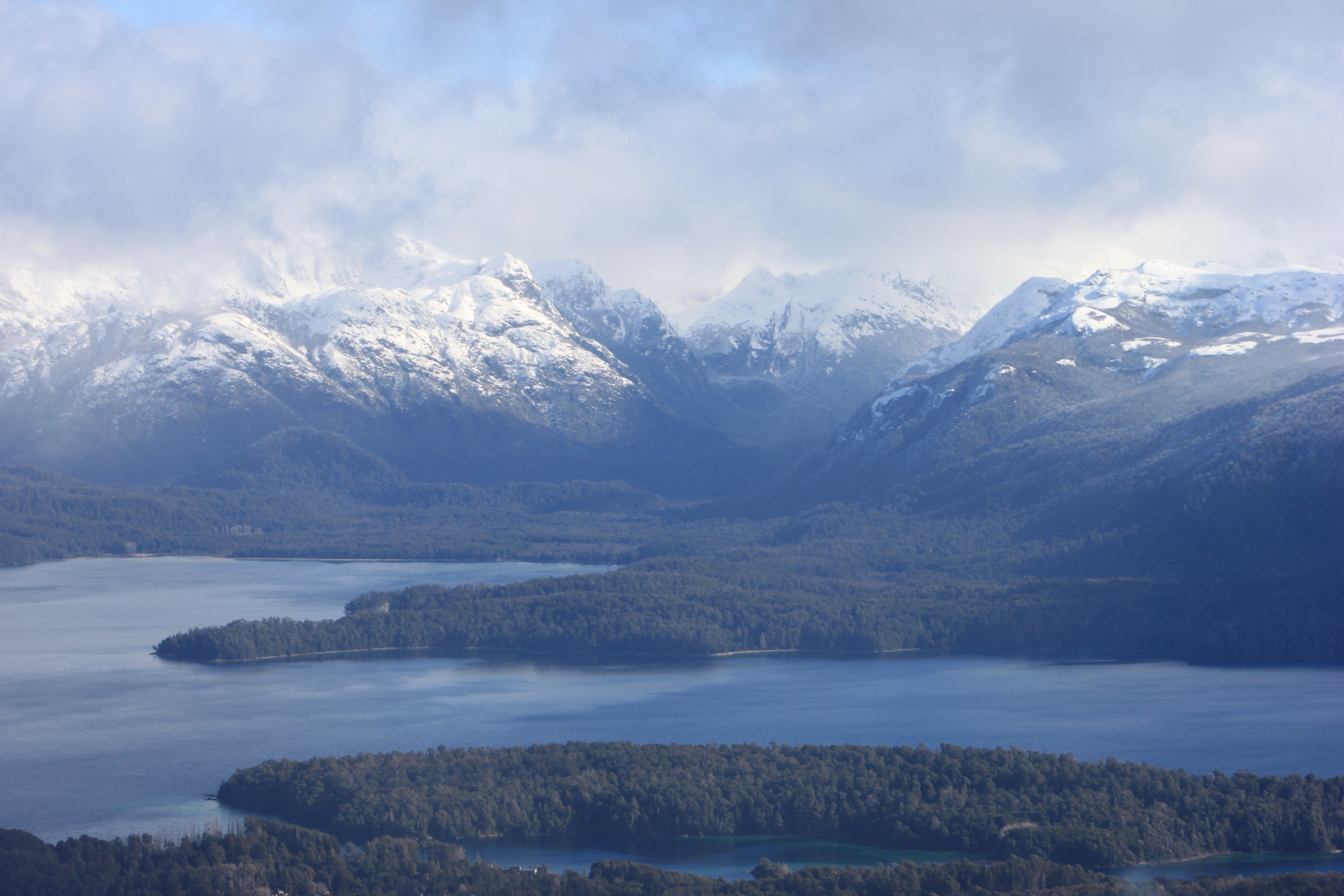
Villa la Angostura.

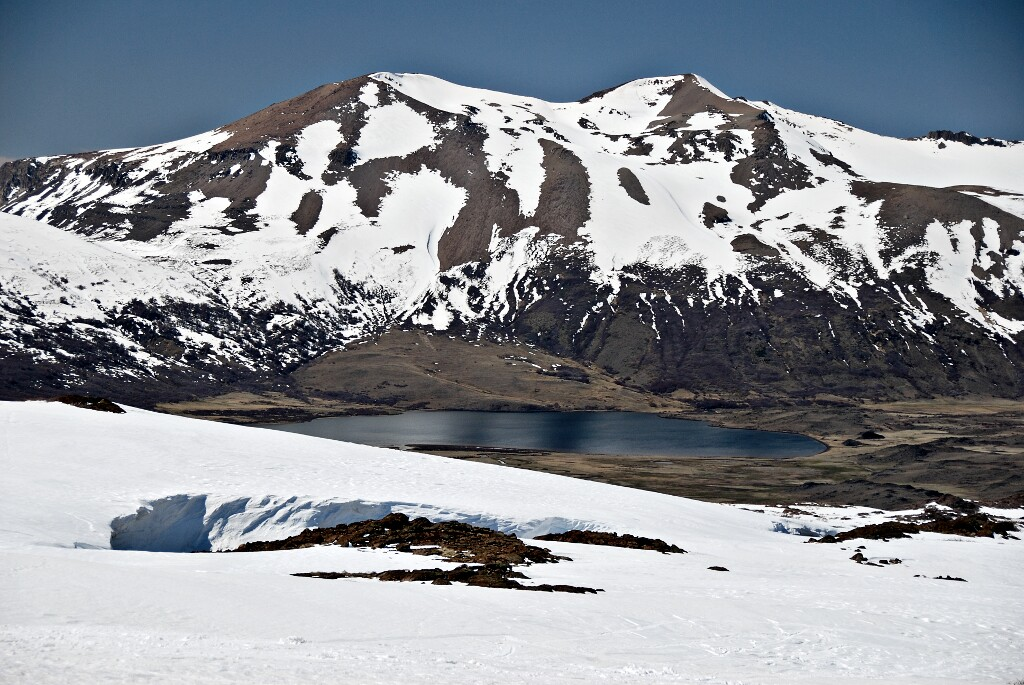
The Flagstones.

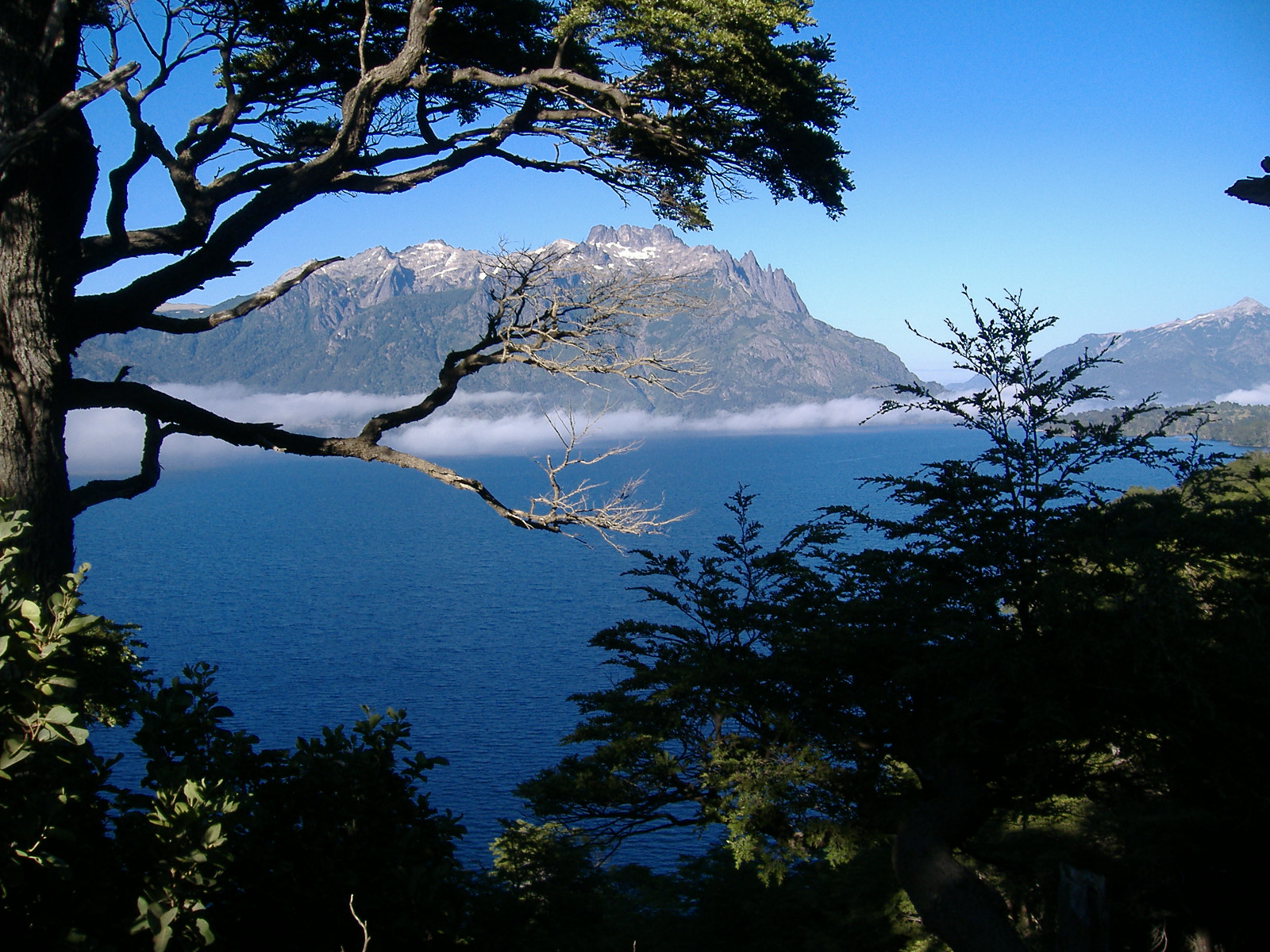
Lake Huechulaufquen.

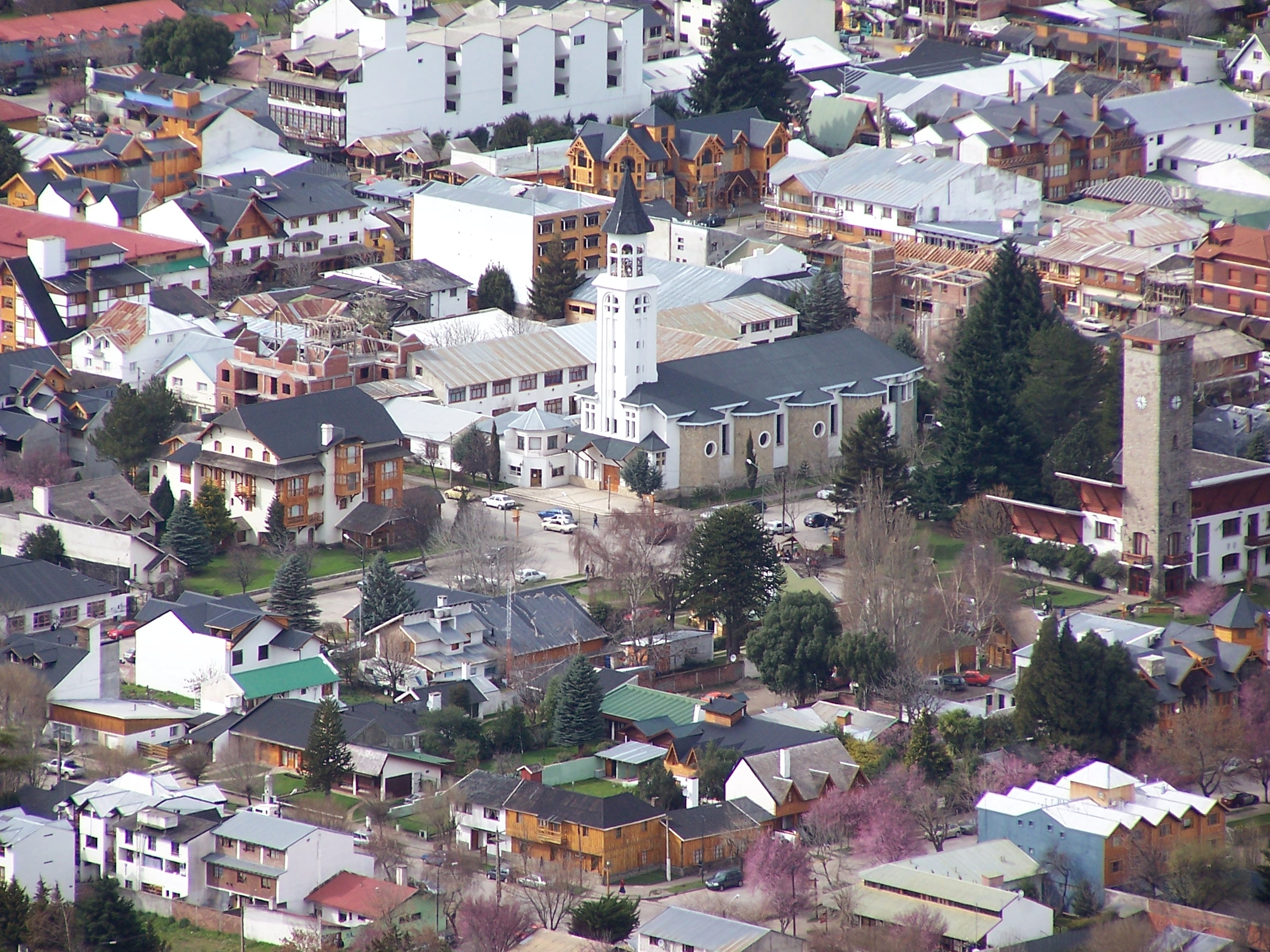
Aerial view of the town of San Martín de los Andes.

The province is divided into 16 departments (Spanish: departamentos), listed below with their areas and their populations at the Censuses of 15 May 1991, 17 November 2000, 27 October 2010 and 16 May 2022:

Map	Name of Department	Capital	Area (km^{2})	Census 1991	Census 2000	Census 2010	Census 2022
	Aluminé	Aluminé	4,660	4,946	6,308	8,306	10,244
	Añelo	Añelo	11,655	4,558	7,554	10,786	18,166
	Catán Lil	Las Coloradas	5,490	2,408	2,469	2,155	2,676
	Chos Malal	Chos Malal	4,330	11,109	14,185	15,256	18,368
	Collón Cura	Piedra del Aguila	5,730	7,865	4,395	4,532	4,835
	Confluencia	Neuquén	7,352	265,123	314,793	362,673	468,794
	Huiliches	Junín de los Andes	4,012	9,679	12,700	14,725	20,973
	Lácar	San Martín de los Andes	4,930	17,085	24,670	29,748	39,596
	Loncopué	Loncopué	5,506	5,206	6,457	6,925	7,698
	Los Lagos	Villa La Angostura	4,230	4,181	8,654	11,998	15,555
	Minas	Andacollo	6,225	5,577	7,072	7,234	9,267
	Ñorquín	El Huecú	5,545	4,136	4,628	4,692	5,609
	Pehuenches	Rincón de los Sauces	8,720	6,538	13,765	24,087	29,753
	Picún Leufú	Picún Leufú	4,580	3,333	4,272	4,589	5,087
	Picunches	Las Lajas	5,913	5,812	6,427	7,022	8,495
	Zapala	Zapala	5,200	31,167	35,806	36,549	45,698

=== Villages ===
- La Buitrera
- Mari Menuco

== Notable people ==
- Marcos Acuña, football player
- Gregorio Álvarez, physician and historian
- Stephanie Beatriz, actor
- Marcelo Berbel, poet
- Raúl di Blasio, pianist
- Omar Carrasco, soldier whose death caused the end of conscription in Argentina; born in Cutral Có
- Irma Cuña, poet
- José María Memet, poet
- Jaime de Nevares, bishop
- Jorge Rojas (singer)
- Rubens Sambueza, football player
- Felipe Sapag, politician
- Valentín Sayhueque, Mapuche chieftain
- Mario Daniel Vega, football player

== See also ==
- Buenos Aires Great Southern Railway
- Ferrocarril General Roca
- Servicios Ferroviarios Patagónico
- Neuquenraptor
- Neuquensaurus
