= Chinese Deep Space Network =

- Emblem of the People's Liberation Army
- Active: 1993; 33 years ago
- Country: China
- Allegiance: Chinese Communist Party
- Branch: People's Liberation Army Strategic Support Force
- Part of: People's Liberation Army

Chinese Deep Space Network and radioastronomy facilities in China in use · planned · radioastronomy facility

The Chinese Deep Space Network (CDSN) is a network of large antennas and communication facilities that are used for radio astronomy, radar observations, and spacecraft missions of China. The CDSN is managed by the China Satellite Launch and Tracking Control Center General (CLTC) of the People's Liberation Army Aerospace Force.

The network was first needed for the lunar mission Chang'e 1, and since has been used to support subsequent missions to the Moon and Mars such as Chang'e 5, Tianwen-1, and Tianwen-2 missions. Similar deep space networks are run by the United States, Russia, European countries, Japan, and India.

== History ==
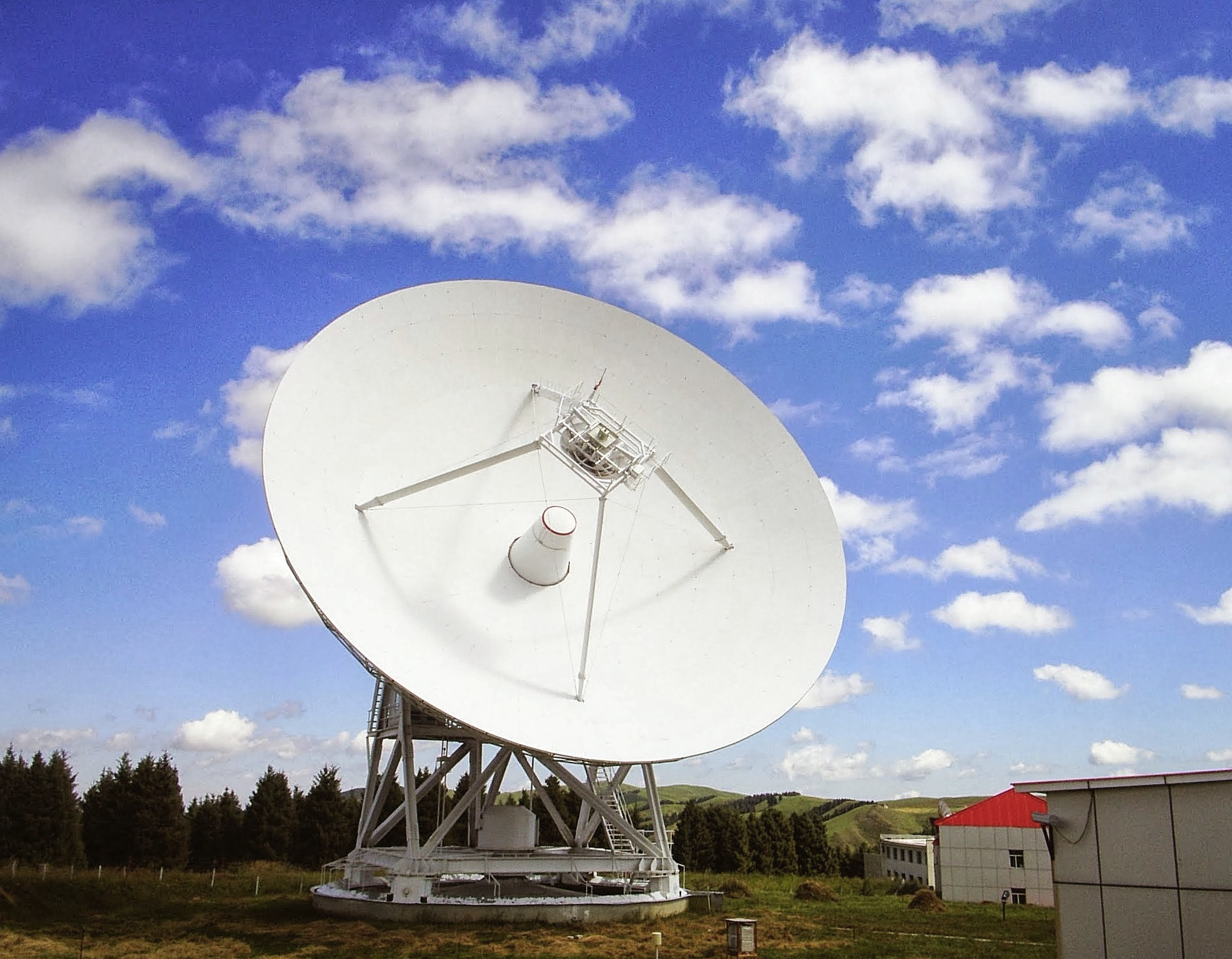
Nanshan 25-meter radio telescope at Xinjiang Astronomical Observatory (XAO), Chinese Academy of Sciences

In principle, a Chinese deep space network has existed since 1993 with the commissioning of the Nanshan 25-meter telescope in the mountains south of Ürümqi. The 25-meter antenna of the Shanghai Astronomical Observatory was then not only able to participate in the Southern Hemisphere VLBI Experiment program, but also to form its own Chinese baseline together with Ürümqi and observe and measure distant objects.

All stations are equipped with high-precision hydrogen maser clocks and connected via powerful communication networks. All stations comply with the provisions of the Consultative Committee for Space Data Systems (CCSDS), so data exchange with the systems of other space agencies is possible despite different technical equipment.

The antennas of Sheshan, Ürümqi, Miyun, Kunming and Tianma can be interconnected to form a national association and in this way form the Chinese VLBI Network (CVN), a VLBI telescope the size of China. The evaluation of the data from the CVN takes place in the VLBI observation base Sheshan of the Shanghai Astronomical Observatory. The facilities in Shanghai and Ürümqi are also integrated into the European VLBI Network (EVN).

== Network ==
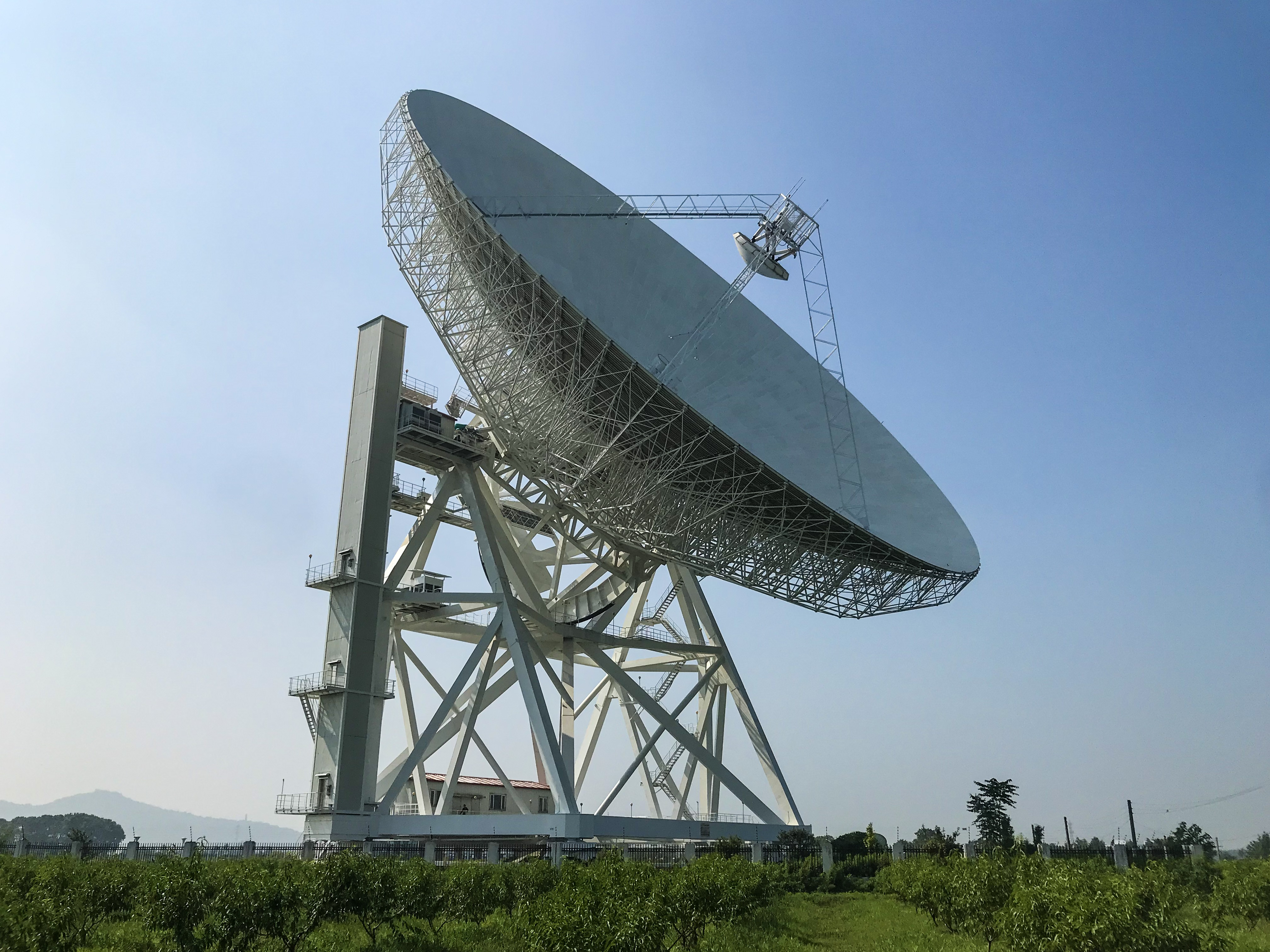
Tianma 65-meter radio telescope at Shanghai Astronomical Observatory (SHAO), Chinese Academy of Sciences

In 2007, the network consisted of:

- Ground control stations in Kashgar and Qingdao (in the Shandong province).
- 18-meter antennas in Qingdao and Kashgar
- A 50-meter antenna at Miyun (~116°E), near Beijing.
- A 40-meter antenna in Yunnan (~101°E).

In 2012, improvements were made to support Chang'e 3 and Chang'e 4 Moon missions, including:

- Upgrades to the ground facilities at Kashgar and Qingdao, and a deep-space ground control station at Jiamusi.
- A new 35-meter antenna at the Kashgar station.
- A 64-meter antenna in Jiamusi. (~130°E)

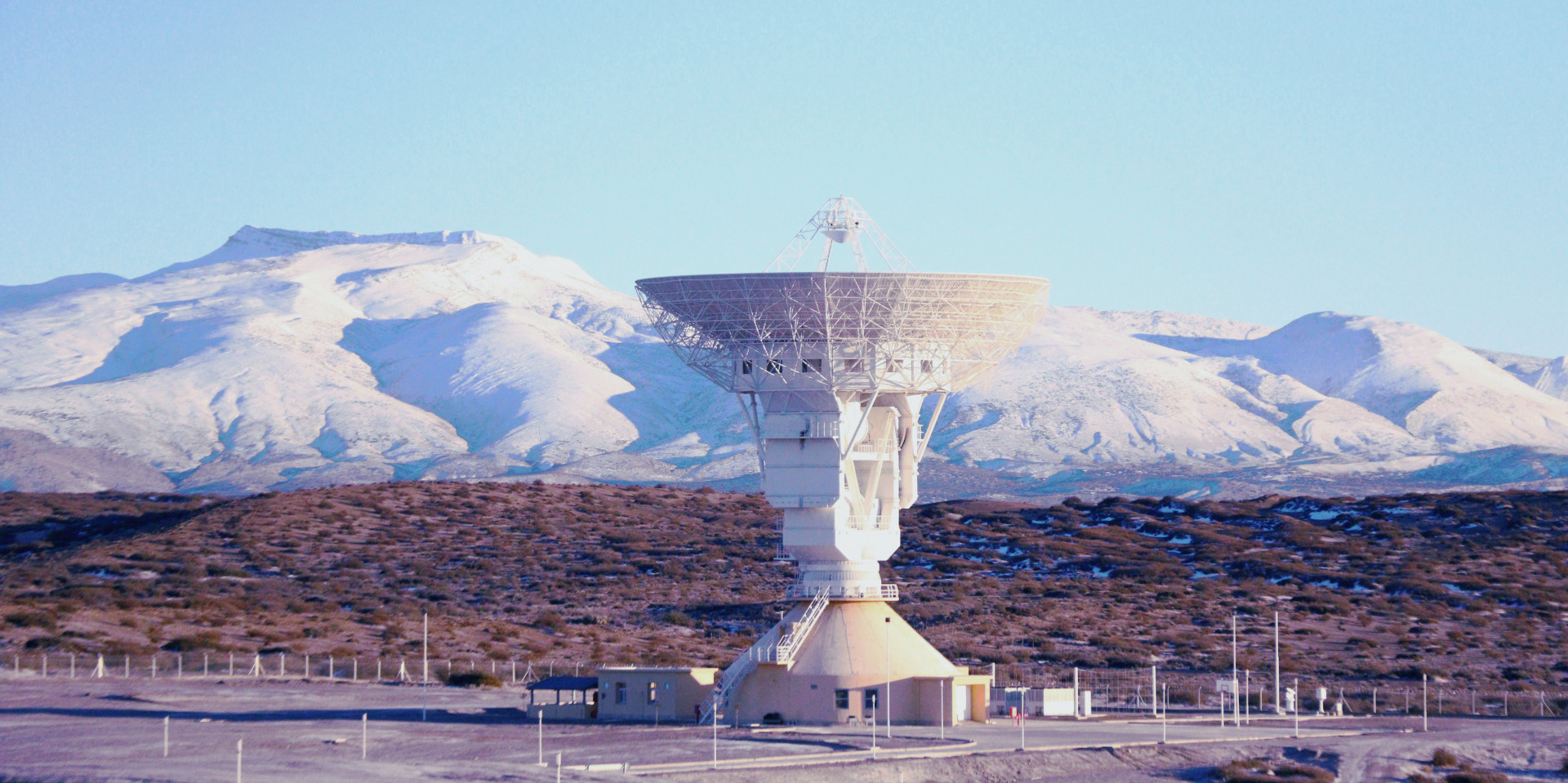
The Espacio Lejano Station of the Chinese Deep Space Network

In 2014, China and Argentina signed an agreement allowing China to construct the Espacio Lejano Station. The station was built in Neuquén Province, Argentina (~70°W), with a 50 million-dollar investment. The facility was inaugurated in October 2017. The station is seen by some as a symbol of China's increased role in South America's politics and economy.

Since 2018, China Satellite Launch and Tracking Control General (CLTC) was a customer of the Swedish Space Corporation (SSC), which provided CLTC services, including TT&C for pre-defined civilian satellites within research, Earth observation and weather data as well as for other scientific spacecraft. It was reported by Reuters on 21 September 2020 that SSC decided not to renew its contracts with China to help operate Chinese satellites from SSC's ground stations, or seek new business with China.

In late 2020, the Kashgar ground station was upgraded from one single 35-meter antenna to an antenna array consisting of four 35-meter antennas. The capacity of the new system was equivalent to a 66-meter antenna.

== Systems for radio astronomy ==
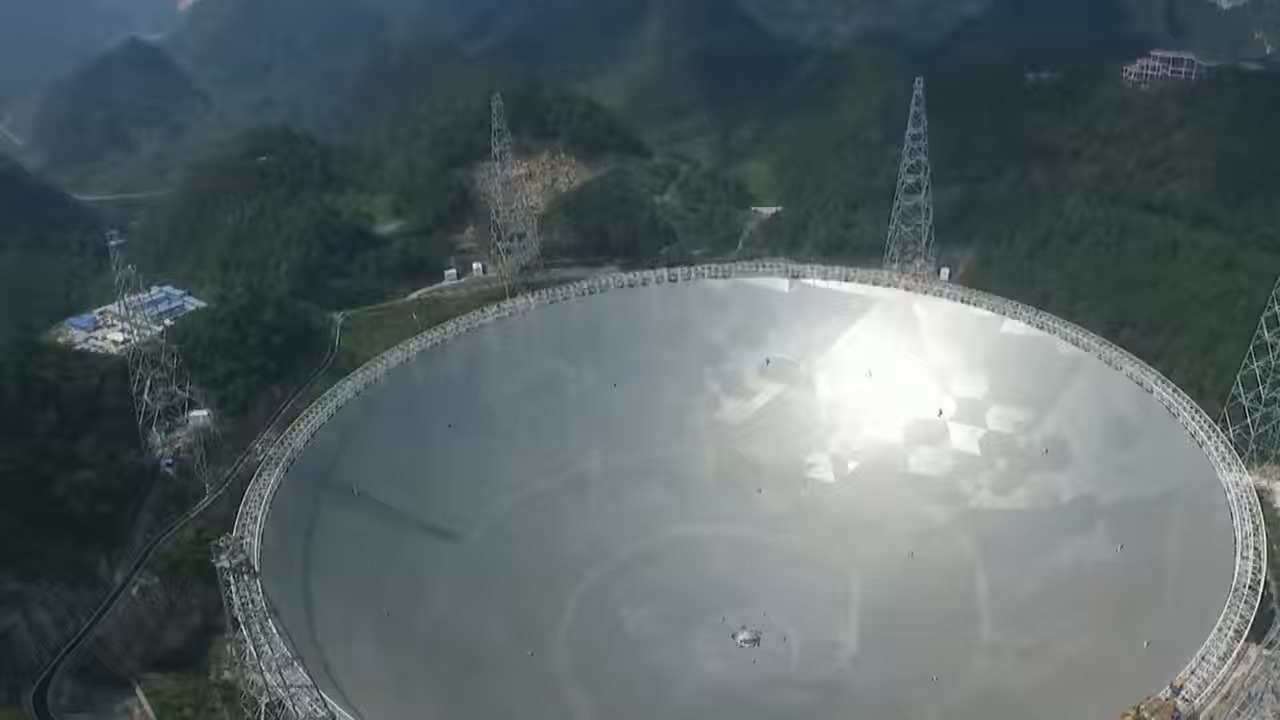
Five-hundred-meter Aperture Spherical Telescope (FAST) as seen from above in 2020

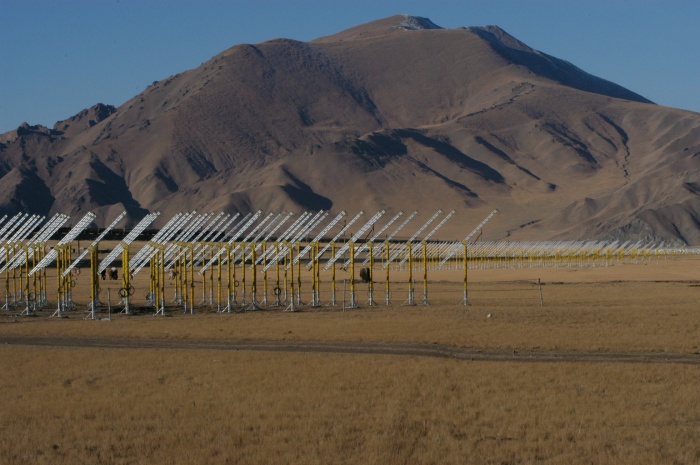
Primeval Structure Telescope (PaST), also called 21 Centimeter Array (21CMA)

Radio astronomy, despite using similar large antennas, is a very different field than spacecraft communication. There is no need to transmit, and the receiving bands are chosen for scientific interest.

- The 15-meter radio telescope in Miyun was built in 1992 and used to study pulsars, but was dismantled around 2002 in favor of the 50-meter radio telescope.
- The Miyun Synthesis Radio Telescope (MSRT) is a telescope for observing solar activity and examines the frequency range of 232 MHz. It consists of 28 antennas with a diameter of 9 meters each with baselines between 18 m and 1164 m at intervals of 6 m and has been in operation since 1998.
- The Five-hundred-meter Aperture Spherical Telescope (FAST) is the radio telescope with the world's largest primary mirror. The total diameter of the immovable spherical main mirror is 500 meters; signals can be effectively received over an area with a diameter of 300 meters (aperture). FAST is mainly used for radio astronomy. However, FAST will play an important role in China's 2020 Mars mission, because of the frequency range of its receivers (70 MHz to 3 GHz). Any Mars landing, such as will be attempted by Tianwen-1, must decelerate from many times the speed of sound to 0 within 6–8 minutes, so the frequency of the carrier wave of the telemetry signals in the X-band changes rapidly due to the Doppler effect. In the event of the sudden braking caused by opening the parachute, the regular deep-space stations will most likely lose contact with the probe. For backup, Mars landings therefore enlist the cooperation of radio astronomy facilities that can receive decimeter band (UHF) communication.
- Primeval Structure Telescope (PaST), also called 21 Centimetre Array (21CMA), in Ulastai, Xinjiang was completed in 2006. It was expanded in 2009 with new, low-noise amplifiers and better computer technology for evaluation. This remote valley array studies the low level emissions of neutral hydrogen from the hydrogen line. The array consists of 81 groups (pods) with a total of 10287 antennas. These are arranged in two mutually perpendicular arms, one 6.1 km long in an east–west direction, the other 4 km long in a north–south direction. Each antenna has 16 dipoles with lengths between 0.242 and 0.829 meters and covers a frequency range from 50 to 200 MHz.

=== Planned or under construction stations ===
- The Qitai Radio Telescope (QTT) is a planned 110-meter radio telescope to be built in Qitai County in Xinjiang, China. Upon completion, which is scheduled for 2023, it will be the world's largest fully steerable single-dish radio telescope. It is intended to operate at 300 MHz to 117 GHz. The fully steerable dish of the QTT will allow it to observe 75% of the stars in the sky at any given time. The QTT and the FAST, also located in China, can both observe frequencies in the "water hole" that has traditionally been favored by scientists engaged in the search for extraterrestrial intelligence (SETI), meaning that each observatory could provide follow-up observations of putative signals from extraterrestrials detected in this quiet part of the radio spectrum at the other observatory.

== Relay satellites ==
China has several relay satellites of the Tianlian series in geostationary orbits, which can relay data to each other and to the ground, thus enabling communication with spacecraft that have no direct contact with ground stations. The technology of the relay satellites enables intermediate storage of data, a higher bandwidth of data connections, and greater sky coverage. These satellites were originally placed in orbit in 2008 for communication with the Shenzhou spacecraft of the crewed space program. But they are also used for deep-space missions, for example in 2020 for the Mars mission Tianwen-1, where the satellites Tianlian 1B and Tianlian 2A were parked for orbit tracking and the transmission of telemetry data from the probe.

== Moon missions ==
- Chang'e 1: remotely controlled from stations at Qingdao and Kashgar, as the first use of the Chinese Deep Space Network.
- Chang'e 2: first to Earth–Sun L_{2} Lagrange point and then to the asteroid 4179 Toutatis.
- Chang'e 3
- Chang'e 4
- Chang'e 5-T1
- Chang'e 5
- Chang'e 6

== Planetary missions ==
- Tianwen-1: Ongoing Mars Mission.
- Tianwen-2 – Chinese asteroid and comet exploration mission

== See also ==
- China National Space Administration (CNSA) – National space agency of the People's Republic of China
- Chinese space program
  - Chinese Lunar Exploration Program – Lunar research program (2004–present)
  - Planetary Exploration of China – Chinese Solar System exploration program
- European VLBI Network – Network of radio telescopes across Europe that link together for radio interferometry
- History of spaceflight
- Yuan Wang-class tracking ship – Chinese strategic support ships
