= National Route 242 (Argentina) =

Highway in Argentina

National Route 242
- Ruta nacional 242
- Old route in green; current route in red.

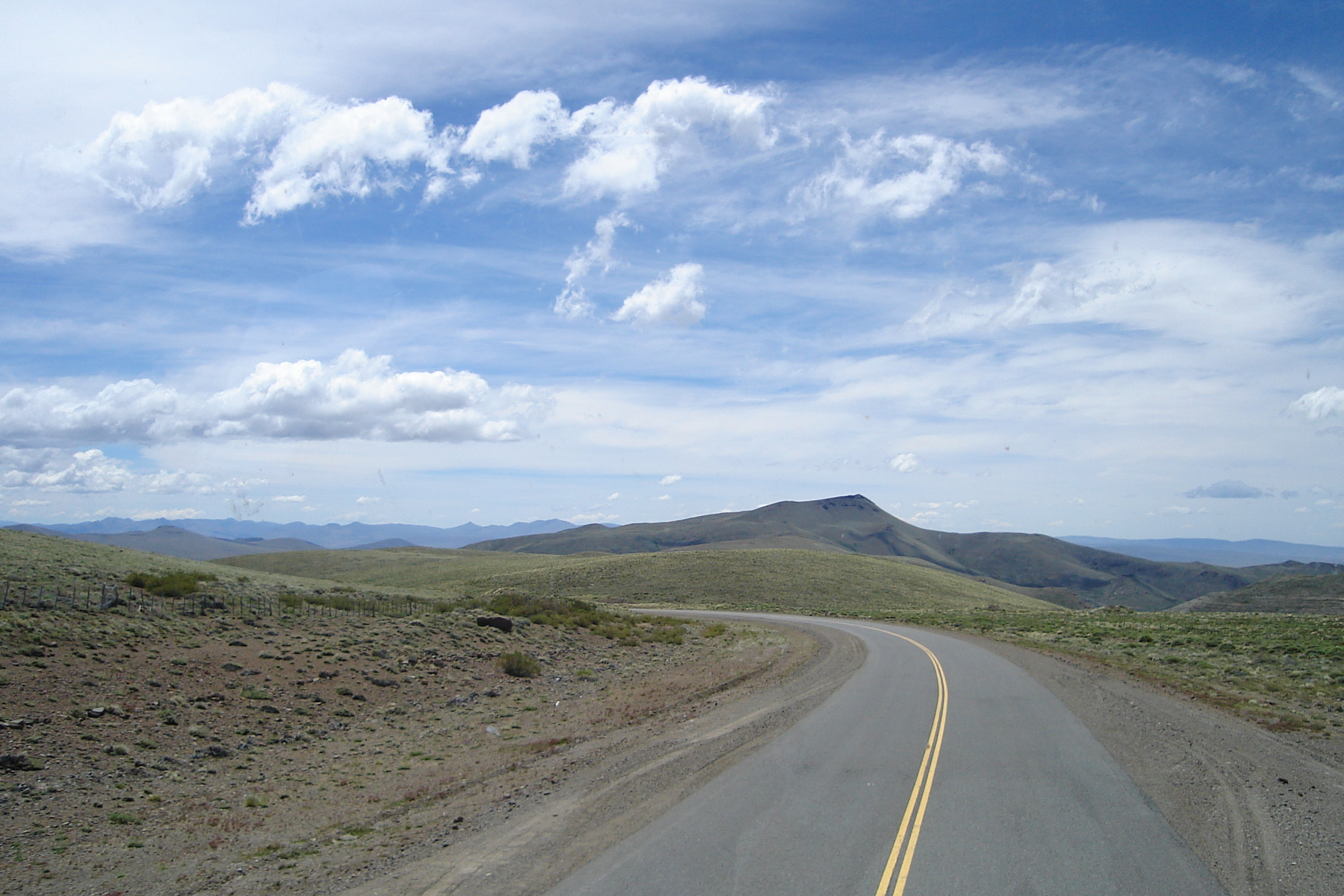

Route information
- Length: 60 km (37 mi)

Major junctions
- Eastern end: Las Lajas
- Western end: Pino Hachado International Pass

Location
- Country: Argentina

Highway system
- Highways in Argentina

National Route 242 (Spanish: Ruta Nacional 242) is a paved highway located in the Picunches Department in the Argentine province of Neuquén. Along its 60 km (37 mi) route, it joins National Route 40 in the vicinity of the town of Las Lajas with the Pino Hachado Pass, at 1,864 m (6,115 ft) above sea level, on the border with Chile. Until 2004, this section belonged to National Route 22. The route continues in Chile as Route CH-181.

== Old Route ==
National Route 242 was included in the original national route plan of 3 September 1935. It began to be built in 1951 and finished in 1953 with its 492 km (306 mi) of gravel, this route passed through the towns of General Roca, Chasicó, Ingeniero Jacobacci and Ñorquincó in the Río Negro Province.

On 23 June 1969, the Paso Córdoba reinforced concrete bridge over the Río Negro was opened to traffic, with a length of 534 m (1,752 ft), being the longest spanning said river. Before the inauguration, of the bridge there was a raft service that had been operating since the end of 1908, being completely renovated and reopened on 4 September 2006.

Through National Decree 1595 of 1979, this road passed into provincial jurisdiction, for which the name was changed to Provincial Route 6.
