= Rayososaurus =

Rayososaurus Temporal range: Albian, ~111–106 Ma
- Skeletal diagram

Scientific classification
- Kingdom: Animalia
- Phylum: Chordata
- Class: Reptilia
- Clade: Dinosauria
- Clade: Saurischia
- Clade: †Sauropodomorpha
- Clade: †Sauropoda
- Superfamily: †Diplodocoidea
- Family: †Rebbachisauridae
- Subfamily: †Limaysaurinae
- Genus: †Rayososaurus; Bonaparte, 1996

Type species
- †Rayososaurus agrioensis Bonaparte, 1996

Extinct genus of dinosaurs

Rayososaurus is an extinct genus of sauropod dinosaur in the family Rebbachisauridae. Rayososaurus was named by Argentinian paleontologist José Bonaparte in 1996. Its type and only accepted species is Rayososaurus agrioensis. The species Limaysaurus tessonei was at one point included in Rayososaurus as Rayososaurus tessonei.

== History of discovery ==
The only known specimen of Rayososaurus agrioensis was discovered in 1991 by a team led by José F. Bonaparte, at a locality three kilometers south of Agrio del Medio in Picunches Department, Neuquén Province, Argentina. In 1996, Bonaparte described the remains as a new genus and species of sauropod, Rayososaurus agrioensis. Bonaparte believed that the strata the specimen was excavated from belonged to the Rayoso Formation, and named the genus after it. The species name refers to the Agrio River, which the specimen was found near. Bonaparte argued that the distinctive morphology of the scapula indicated that Rayososaurus was closely related to Rebbachisaurus, which was considered a diplodocid at the time, and suggested that the two probably represent a previously unrecognized clade of sauropods distinct from diplodocids. Efforts undertaken in 2008 and 2009 re-located the original locality and determined that the specimen actually came from the upper layers of the Candeleros Formation.

In 1998, Jeffrey Wilson and Paul Sereno proposed assigning Rebbachisaurus tessonei to Rayososaurus. In 2004, Salgado and colleagues rejected this assignment and proposed the new genus Limaysaurus for R. tessonei, which is now known as Limaysaurus tessonei.

=== Fossil record ===
The holotype and only known specimen of Rayososaurus agrioensis from the Candeleros Formation, MACN-N 41, consists of two partial scapulae, most of the left femur, and the proximal half of the left fibula. Originally suggested to be the Cenomanian age of the Late Cretaceous, the maximum depositional age of both the Candeleros Formation and the overlying Huincul Formation is re-dated to the early Albian by Maniel et al. (2026), approximately 111.4 ± 1.1 Ma and 106.2 ± 1.0 Ma respectively.

Specimens from Brazil were assigned to Rayososaurus in 2004, but this was based on the now-rejected inclusion of Limaysaurus tessonei in Rayososaurus, so the specimens would better be referred to Limaysaurus, although they might actually be fragmentary remains of Amazonsaurus.

== Description ==
Rayososaurus has been considered a medium-sized sauropod, with a body mass estimated at 9,353 kg. Like other rebbachisaurids, Rayososaurus had a racquet-shaped scapula.
