= Qitai =

Qitai may refer to:

- Qitai County in China
- a drug trade now for Salmeterol, a bronchodilator
