= Liucura =

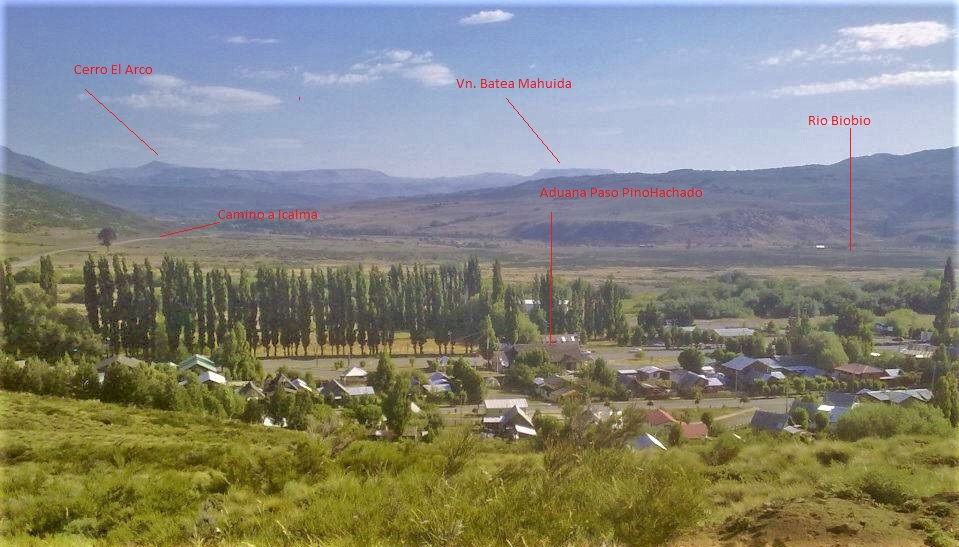
- Interactive map of Liucura
- Coordinates: 38°38′42.7″S 71°05′20.6″W
- Region: Araucanía
- Province: Malleco
- Municipality: Lonquimay
- Commune: Lonquimay

Government
  - Type: Municipal

Population (2017)
  - Total: 155
- Time zone: UTC−04:00 (Chilean Standard)
  - Summer (DST): UTC−03:00 (Chilean Daylight)
- Area code: Country + town = 56 + 45

Llancacura is a hamlet (Spanish: caserío) located east of the main chain of the Andes and east of city of Lonquimay in Malleco Province, southern Chile. It lies in uppermost part of Biobío River's basin and next the Pacific-Atlantic continental divide. It lies along Chile Route 181 next to the Argentine border with the international crossing of Pino Hachado Pass being next to the hamlet.
