= Xinjiang Beishan Mining Industry Co., Ltd. =

Chinese coal company

Xinjiang Beishan Mining Industry Co., LTD. (Chinese: 新疆北山矿业有限公司), is a Chinese coal products company established in 2007 in Ürümqi, Xinjiang Region. Hong Kong Rong Hua Energy Group is its major investor. The CEO of the company is LIN Qingxiang (Chinese: 林庆祥) Xinjiang Beishan Mining Industry Co. claims to have an annual production capacity of 6 million tons and reports annual revenues of 900 million yuan. The main production site is in the Qitai County, Xinjiang Uyghur Autonomous Region in the north west of China. The company has approximately 500 employees.

== Production ==
Beishan Mining specializes in products ranging from raw coal products, coke, semi-coke, coal tar, to other ancillary products. It also provides coal and coke logistics and distribution services.

== Environmental concerns ==
According to a recent investigation by the Huffington Post, Beishan is producing more than its official mining license allows. Instead of its mandated quota of 400,000 tons per year, Beishan has been steadily producing around 6 million tons of coal every year.
