= Malargüe Station =

Radio antenna

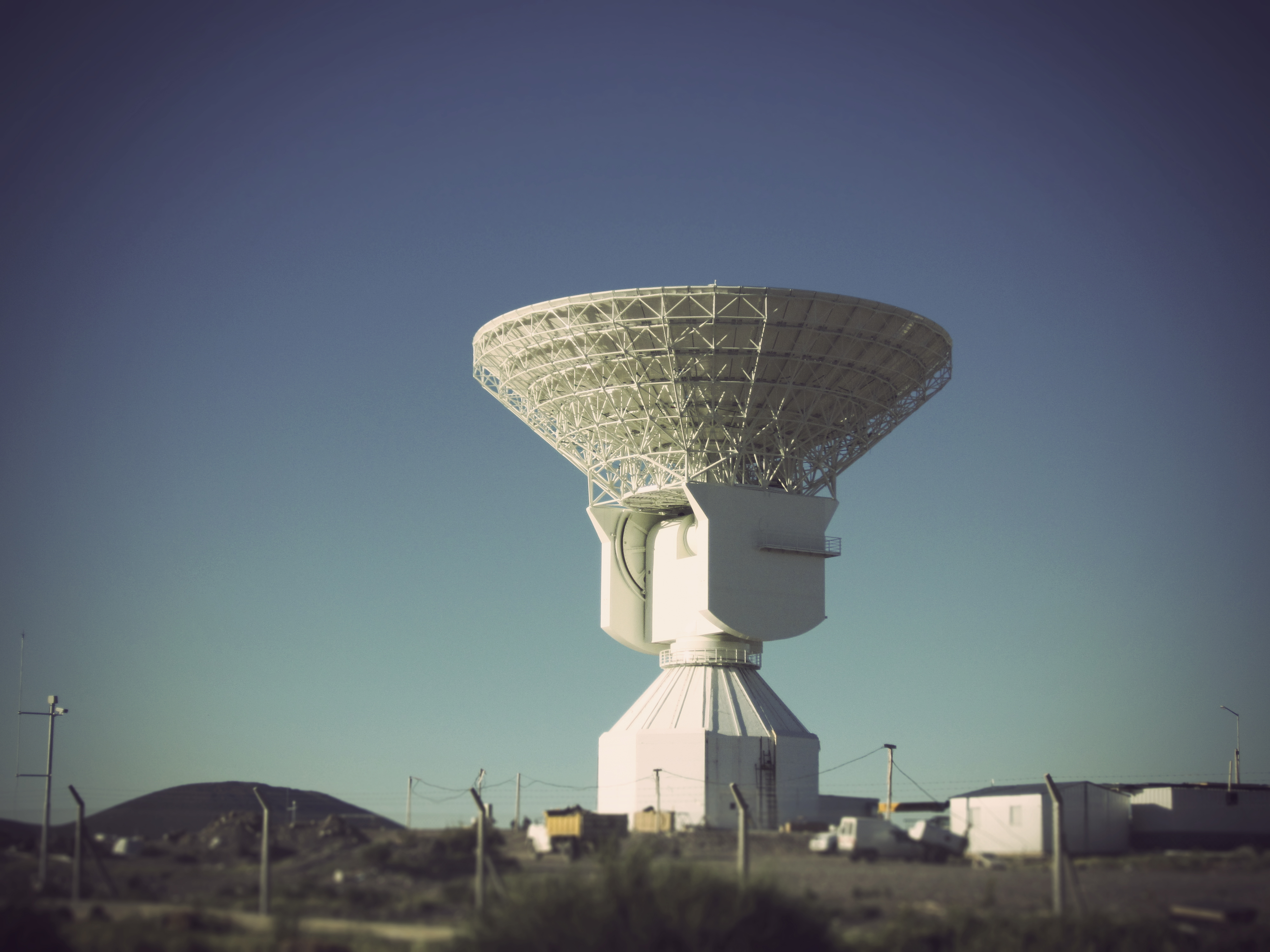
- The Malargüe station antenna.
- Alternative names: DSA 3
- Location: Mendoza Province, Argentina
- Coordinates: 35°46′34″S 69°23′54″W
- Altitude: 1,550 m (5,090 ft)
- Wavelength: 26, 8, 32 GHz (1.15, 3.75, 0.94 cm)
- Diameter: 35 m (114 ft 10 in)
- Mounting: altazimuth mount
- Website: www.esa.int/Our_Activities/Operations/Estrack/Malarguee_-_DSA_3
- Location within Argentina
- Related media on Commons

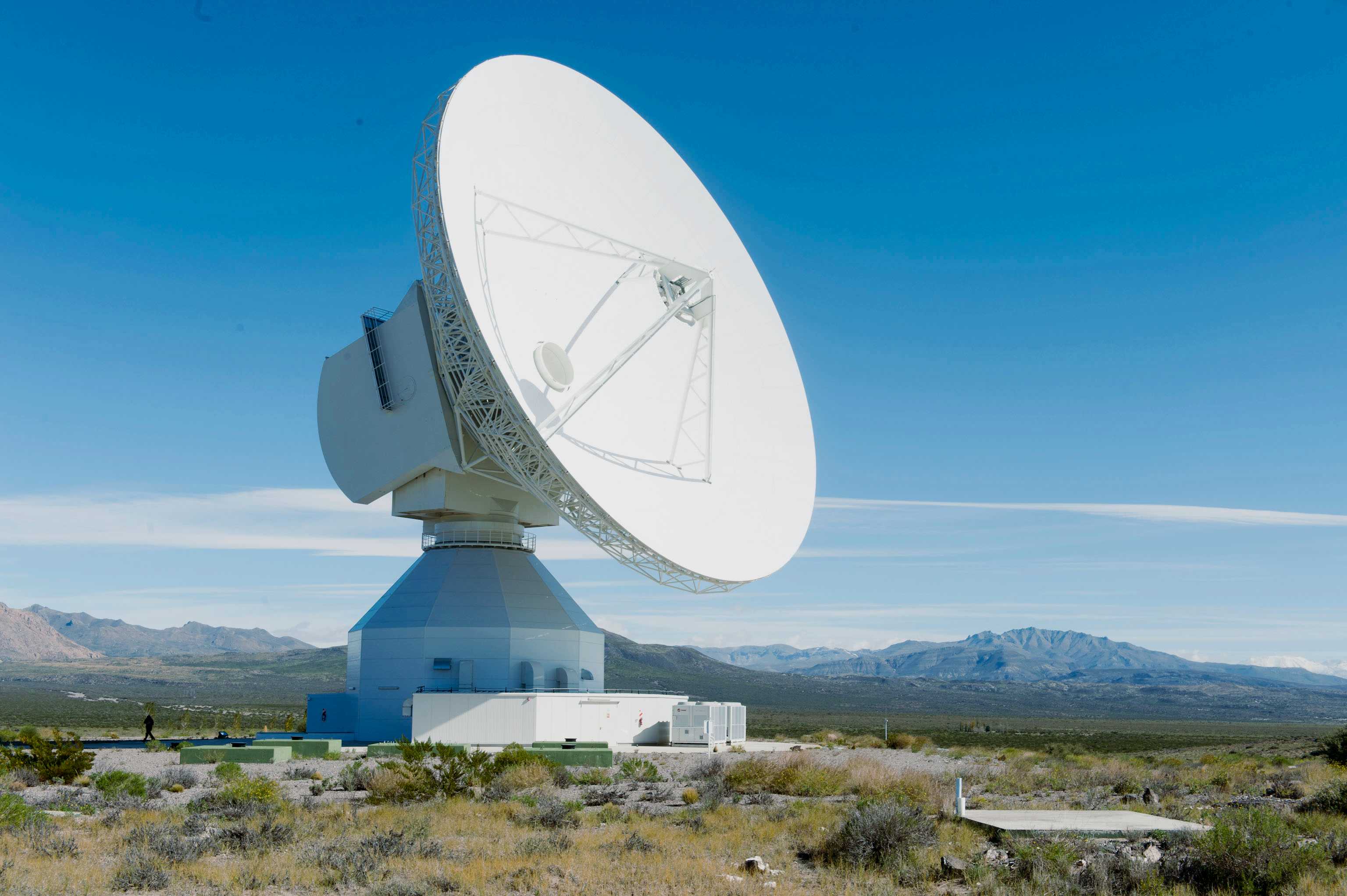
Malargüe Station

Malargüe Station (also known as DSA 3 or Deep Space Antenna 3) is a 35-metre ESTRACK radio antenna in Argentina. It enables the European Space Agency (ESA) to communicate with spacecraft in deep space. It is located 40 kilometres (25 mi) south of the town of Malargüe, Argentina. The Malargüe antenna has two sister stations, Cebreros Station, near Madrid, Spain, and New Norcia Station near New Norcia, Western Australia. The completion of this station allows ESTRACK to track deep space missions continuously.

On 7 December 2011, the station's 35 m-diameter dish antenna was hoisted into place. The operation took several hours and had to wait for a calm day with no wind. The station underwent tests in 2012 and was fully operational in 2013.

Malargüe Station was one of the stations providing communications, tracking and data download from the Rosetta spacecraft.

20 kW CW High Power Amplifier (HPA) it was created by Rheinmetall Italia S.p.A. (Italy). The monitoring and control system was implemented by Microsis srl (Italy). A 500W ASI Ka transmitter (Italian Space Agency) has been installed for Ka band transmission experiments carried out jointly with NASA. The transmitter was made by Rheinmetall Italia S.p.A. (Italy) and Microsis srl (Italy).

== Scientific use ==
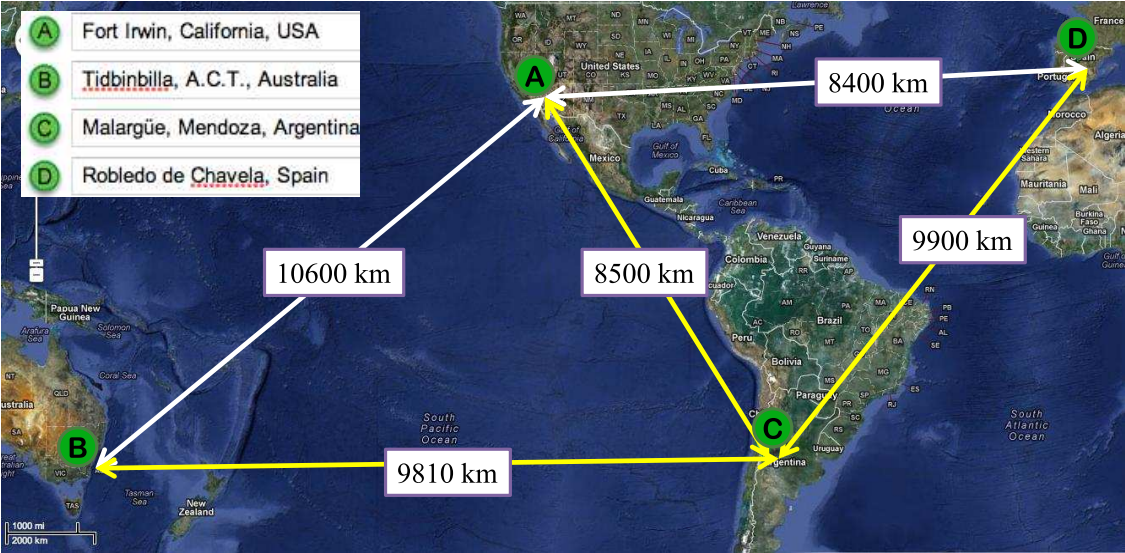
Distance to Malargue station from the other stations of the NASA VLBI network

Due to its location far from the large antennas of the NASA network for Very-long-baseline interferometry (VLBI), Malargüe Station is particularly able to contribute to the location of astronomical radio sources in the Southern hemisphere.

== See also ==
- Espacio Lejano Station, a similar station in Argentina that is part of the Chinese Deep Space Network.
