= July 2011 Chilean winter storm =

Weather event in Chile

The July 2011 Chilean winter storm was a winter storm affecting the Andean portions of Biobío, including Ñuble Province, and Araucanía regions in south-central Chile. Through the Andean valleys thousands of people were left isolated because of heavy snowfall. In some sectors, blackouts occurred. Avalanches left the tourist facilities of Termas de Chillán isolated. There was a loss of livestock, mainly sheep as a consequence of the storm. On the night of July 19, temperatures as low as −18 °C (0 °F) were reported in Liucura.

The Chilean Air Force made an operation to deliver supplies to isolated localities. Defense Minister Andrés Allamand visited the affected area.

== See also ==
- White Earthquake
