= Espacio Lejano Station =

Ground station of the Chinese Deep Space Network

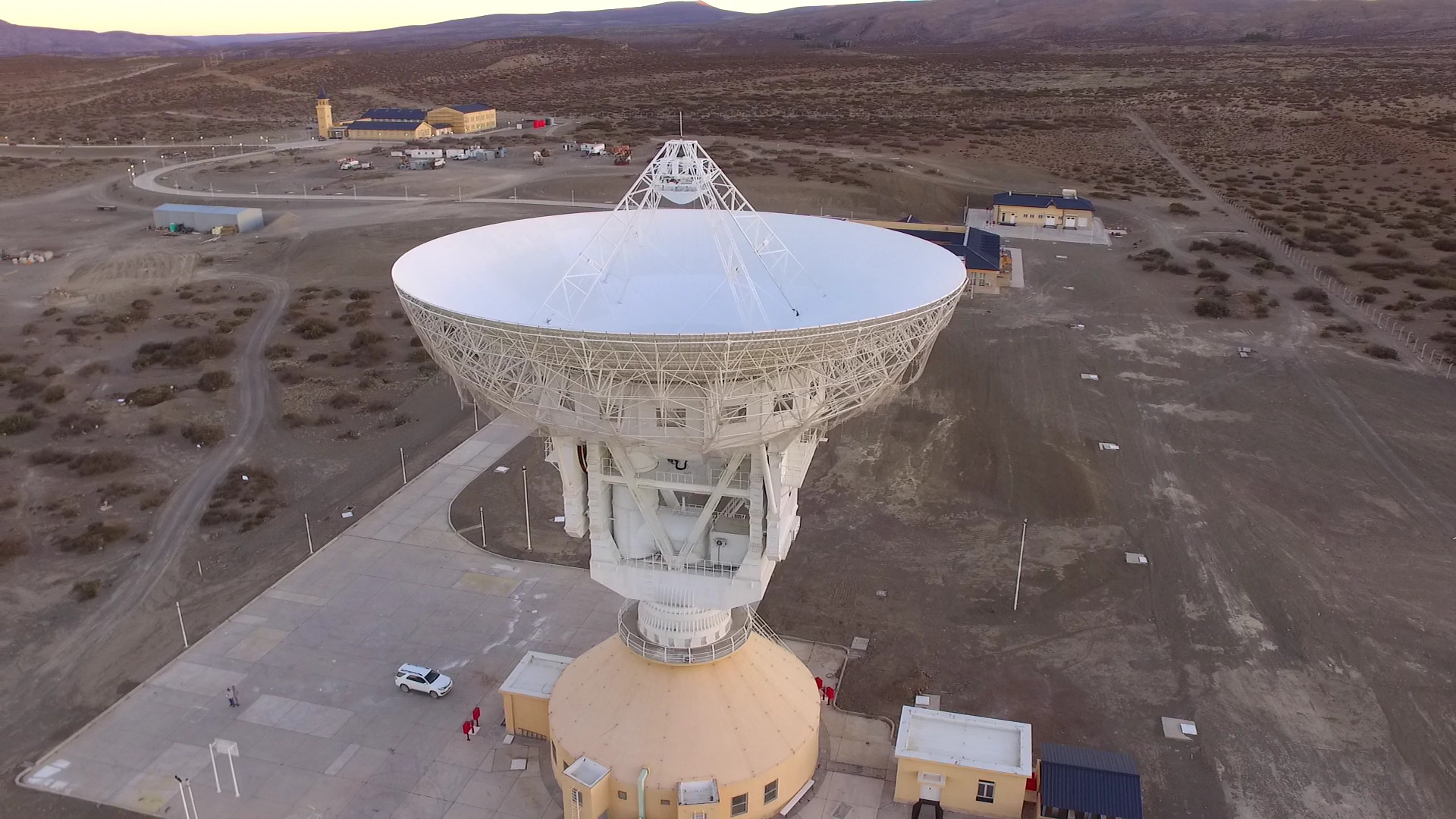
- Alternative names: Deep Space Ground Station
- Location: Loncopué Department, Neuquén Province, Argentina
- Coordinates: 38°11′29″S 70°08′58″W
- Location within Argentina
- Related media on Commons

The Espacio Lejano Station is a radio station located in Loncopué Department, Neuquén Province, Argentina, and is operated by the Chinese National Space Administration as part of the Chinese Deep Space Network, in collaboration with Argentina's National Space Activities Commission (CONAE). The Chinese Deep Space Network is managed by the China Satellite Launch and Tracking Control General (CLTC), which was under the People's Liberation Army Strategic Support Force until its functions were transferred to the People's Liberation Army Aerospace Force in 2024.

The station was built and is maintained by subsidiaries of China Communications Construction Company. It has been operational since 2018. Concerns have been raised over potential dual use of the station.

== Background ==
The observatory is located north of Bajada del Agrio, near the Salado River on provincial route 33, in the so-called Pampa de Pilmatué, in the deserts of Patagonia. The station is based on a two-square-kilometer plot and houses a 35-meter antenna. It is the first Chinese deep space earth station built outside China. The land was leased in 2012 to the Chinese government for 50 years of use, and the agreement includes a tax exemption.

China invested $50 million into building the station. Future plans for the facility include research on Mars. The radio station employs at least thirty Chinese employees. The facility has reportedly had a positive effect on the local economy, including the nearby town of Las Lajas, in part as a result of construction work which required 300 workers.

According to Chinese media, the station played a key role in China's mission in landing a lunar rover on the dark side of the moon.

== Military use concerns ==
Many, including local residents, journalists, think tanks, and the U.S. government, have voiced concern that the station may be used for military or signals intelligence purposes, but others have challenged or tempered this view. Mauricio Macri's former foreign minister, Susana Malcorra, said in an interview that Argentina has no physical oversight of the station's operations. In 2016, Argentine officials stated that China agreed to use the station solely for civilian purposes, but without an oversight mechanism in place. Opposition legislators characterized the 50-year agreement with the Chinese government as a loss of national sovereignty.

In 2024, after U.S. Ambassador Marc Stanley publicly complained about the station, the government of Javier Milei was reported to want to inspect the station for contract compliance. This was later toned down to a five-hour "visit", which took place on April 18th and was deemed a "superficial technical review." Government spokesman Manuel Adorni concluded there was no military activity on the station, while chancellor Diana Mondino said she could not tell if there were military personnel because the Chinese "can't be told apart".

== See also ==
- Malargüe Station, a similar station run by ESTRACK for the ESA.
- List of radio telescopes
