= Agrio River =

Coordinates: 38.3672°S 69.7061°W

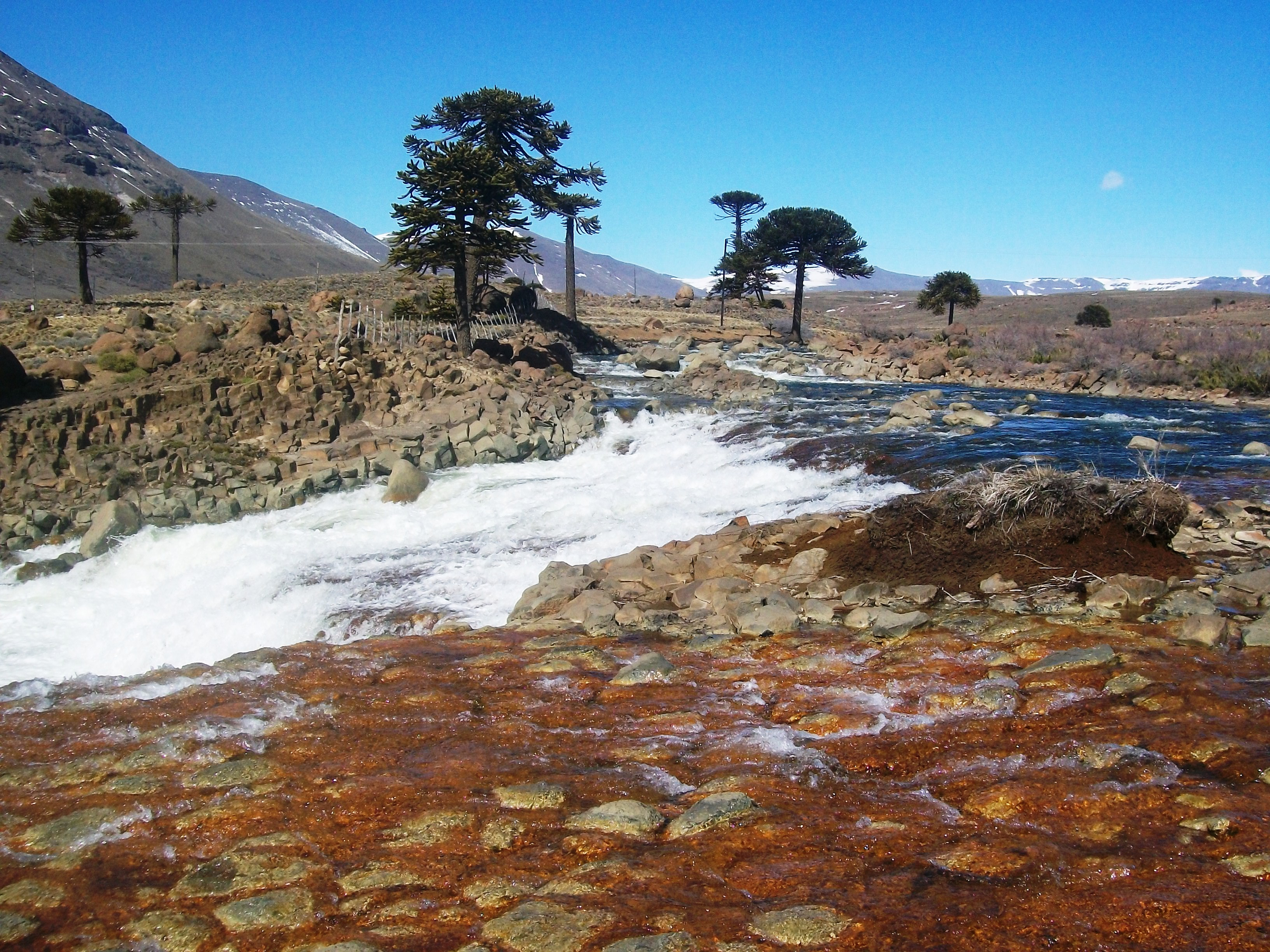
- Agrio River in Caviahue, Argentina

Location
- Country: Argentina

Physical characteristics
- Source
  - elevation: Copahue
- Mouth
  - elevation: Neuquén River
- Length: 400 km
- Basin size: 10,000 km^{2}
- Discharge
  - average: 74.51 m^{3}

The Agrio River is a river of Argentina. The river starts in the Andes Mountains and eventually joins the Neuquén River.

== Course ==
The Agrio River originates from the Copahue Volcano and features seven waterfalls within a landscape of rocky terrains and araucaria forests. It forms Lake Caviahue on the plateau and continues as its effluent, producing the notable Cascada del Agrio waterfall before joining the Neuquén River. Along its course, the river passes through several towns.

The river has whitish, milky waters due to high sulfuric acid content, with a sour taste. The surrounding area, characterized by basalt mountains and araucaria forests, is a popular tourist destination, featuring the town of Caviahue-Copahue, ski slopes, and thermal baths known for their mineral-rich waters. The region also has geysers providing steam for medicinal baths.

Extending from Lake Caviahue's outlet to the Neuquén River, this 400 km segment receives water from streams like Yumu Yumu, Codihue, Hualcupén, and Huarenchenque. Settlements along its banks include Loncopué, Las Lajas, Bajada del Agrio, Agrio del Medio, and Quili Malal. Plans are underway to construct the Chihuido hydroelectric dam at its confluence with the Neuquén River, a significant project for the region.

== Gallery ==
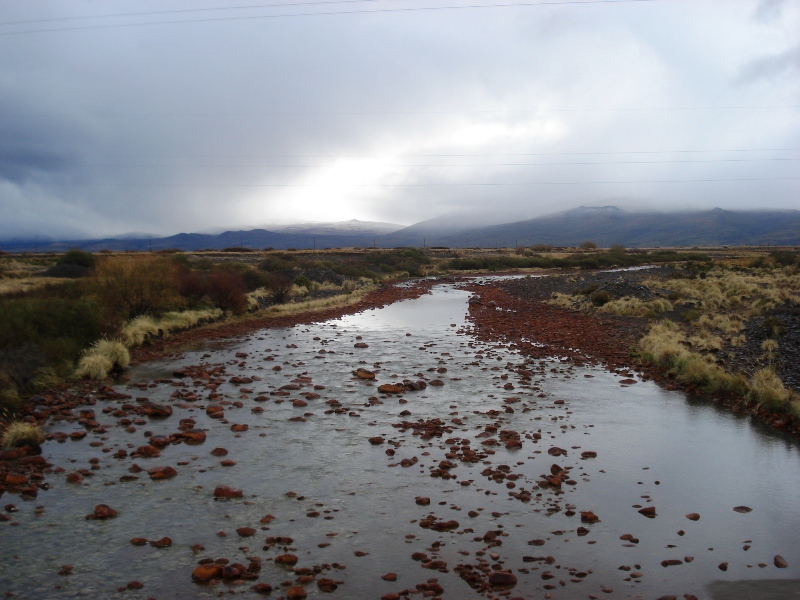
View to the west of the Agrio River

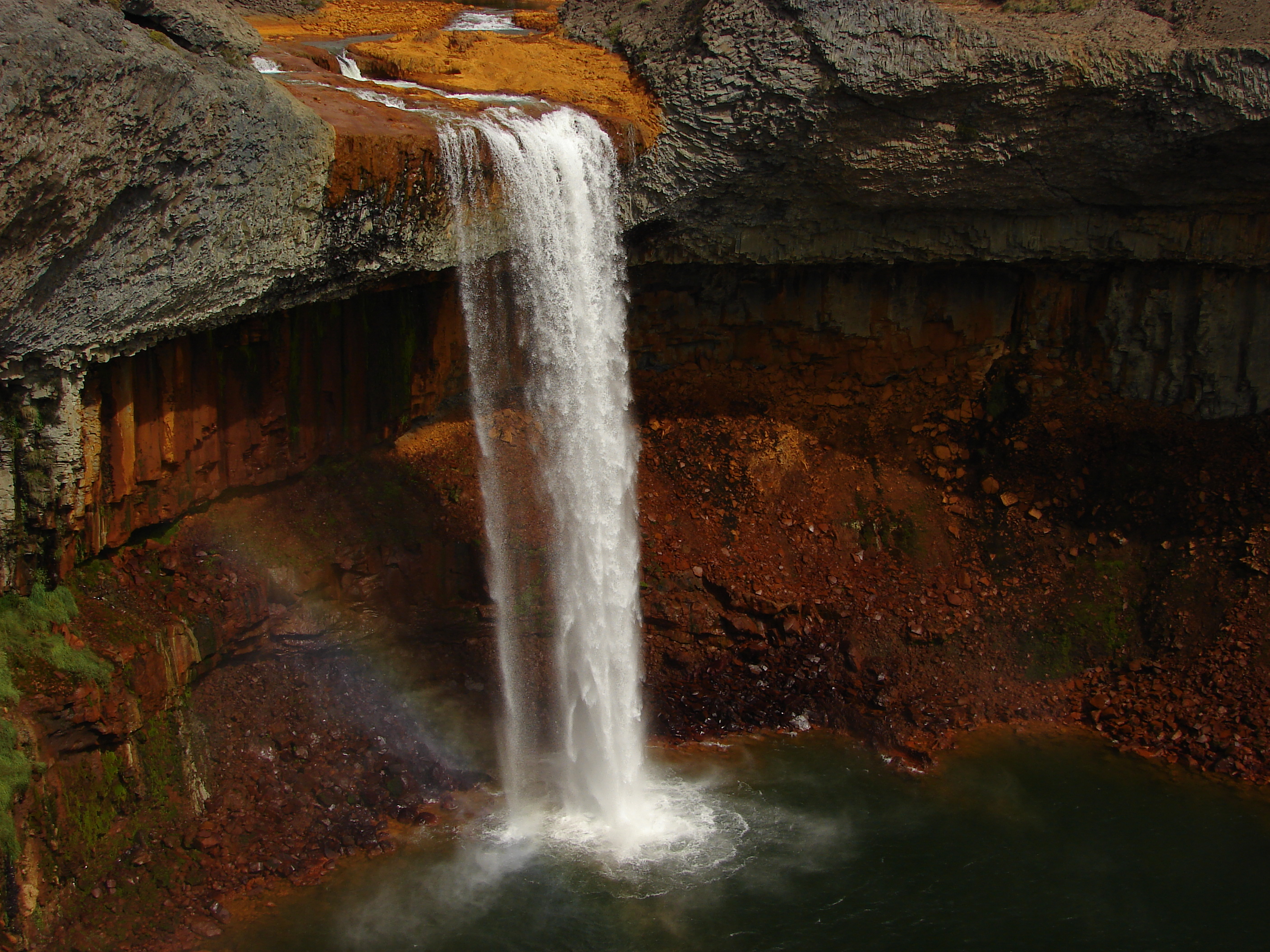
Salto del Agrio waterfall

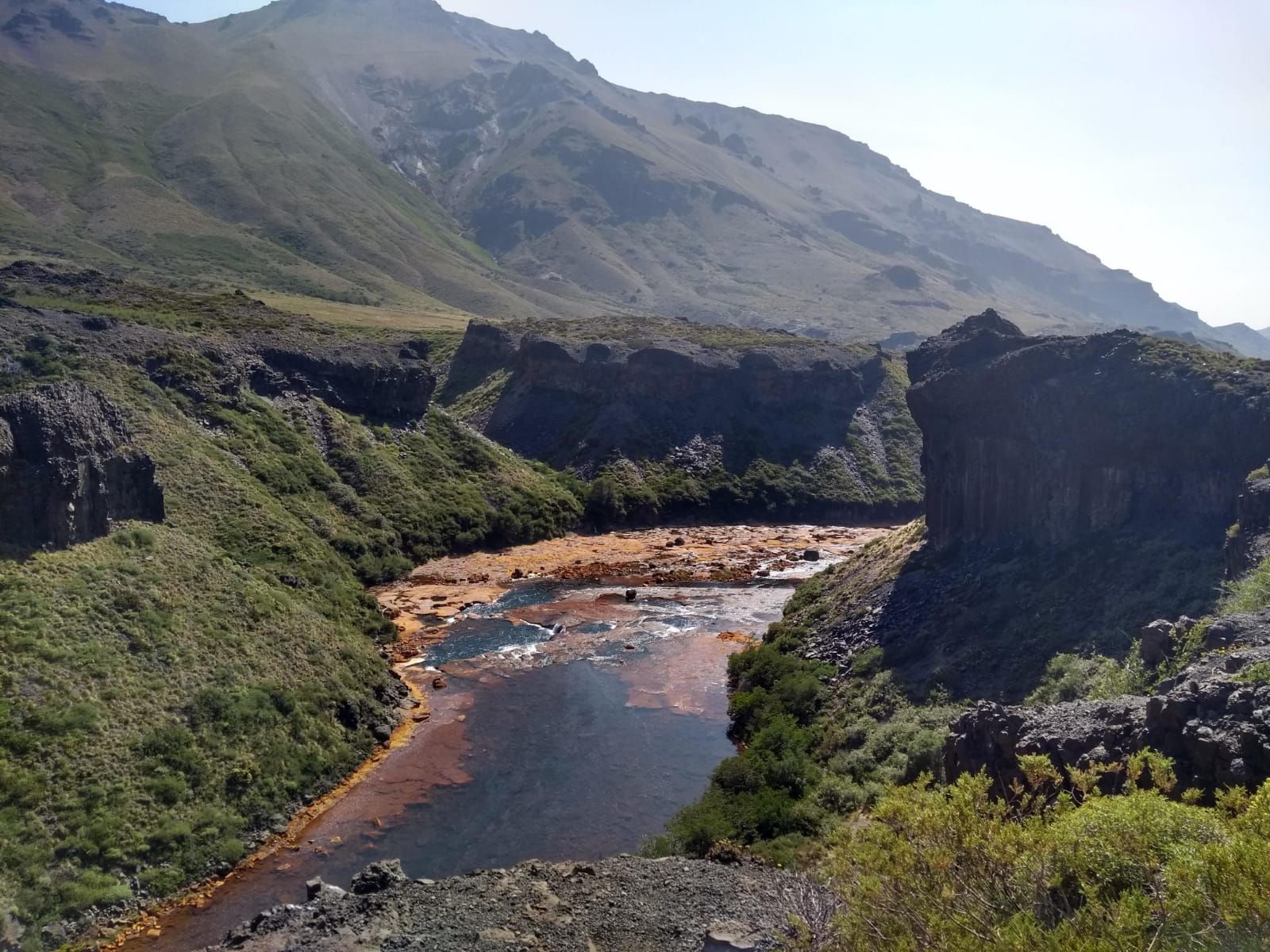
The water path after the waterfall

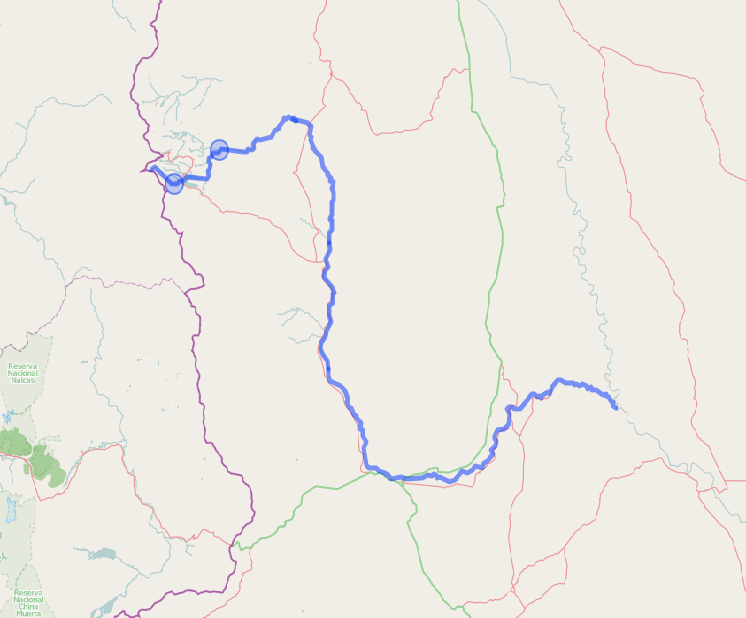
Course of the Agrio River

== See also ==
- List of rivers of Argentina

== Sources ==
- Rand McNally, The New International Atlas, 1993.
- GEOnet Names Server
