= Xinjiang Astronomical Observatory =

Astronomical observatory in Xinjiang, China

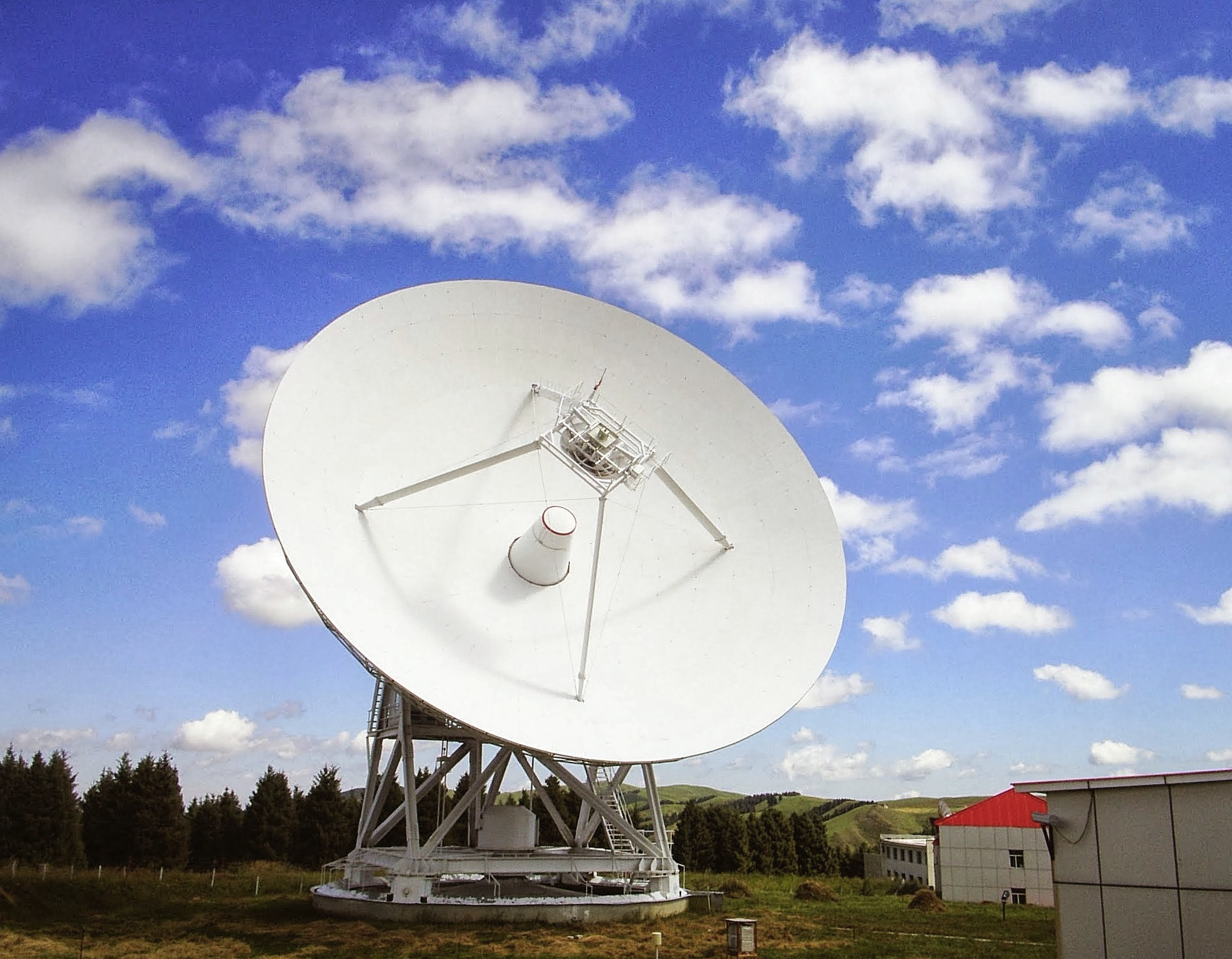
- The Nanshan 25 m radio telescope
- Alternative names: Xīnjiāng tiānwéntái
- Location: Ürümqi, Xinjiang, PRC
- Coordinates: 43°28′N 87°11′E
- Website: english.xao.ac.cn
- Telescopes: Nanshan Radio Telescope; Qitai Radio Telescope
- Location of Xinjiang Astronomical Observatory
- Related media on Commons

Xinjiang Astronomical Observatory (XAO; Chinese: 新疆天文台; pinyin: Xīnjiāng Tiānwéntái) of the Chinese Academy of Sciences was known as Ürümqi Astronomical Observatory before it was renamed in January 2011.

The current research at XAO spans many fields of astronomy. It consists of radio astronomy, optical astronomy and applications of astronomy, especially pulsars, star formation and evolution, galaxies and cosmology, high energy astrophysics, microwave receiver, digital technology, GPS, and so on. The Radio Astrophysics Laboratory of XAO is a member of the radio astronomy key laboratories in the Chinese Academy of Sciences, and has also been awarded the status of Key Laboratory of Xinjiang Uygur Autonomous Region. XAO operates the Nanshan site, Kashgar site, Qitai site and other two independent ground stations.

== Facilities ==
The observatory's facilities include the Nanshan Radio Telescope (see List of radio telescopes#Asia), located in Gangou Township, Ürümqi County (43°28′17″N 87°10′41″E). The 25 m telescope site in Nanshan of XAO is one of the important stations of Very-long-baseline interferometry (VLBI). As a crucial research base for pulsar, centimeter wave molecular line and active galactic nuclei research, Nanshan station is also involved and plays an important role in China's Lunar Exploration Program.

Plans also exist for the construction of a large, fully steerable single-dish radio telescope (diameter 110 m), which is called Qitai Radio Telescope, or QTT for short. The chosen site for the facility is in Banjiegou Town, Qitai County. Upon completion, the sensitivity of 110 m antenna is about 20 times more than a 25 m telescope.

On July 15, 2012, the groundbreaking ceremony took place at Banjiegou for the Xinjiang Qitai Astronomical and Science Education Base, which is presumably the facility that will house the telescope.

== Programs ==
XAO has held a wide range of interesting public science popularization since it was set up. Popular science in XAO comprises Star Party for the public, Field Trip for students, Astronomers Get into Campus, free camps for children who live in remote poverty-stricken areas, Open House Day and so on.

International collaboration is an important channel for XAO to promote the development of astronomy, astrophysics and other related fields of science.

XAO has more than 100 staff members, including 87 scientific and technical personnel, 19 management personnel, and 2 professors emeritus and experts from foreign universities and research institutions as guest professors.

== See also ==
- List of astronomical observatories
