= Las Lajas, Neuquén =

Las Lajas
- Town
- Location within Neuquén Province Location within Argentina
- Coordinates: 38°36′S 70°18′W
- Country: Argentina
- Province: Neuquén Province
- Department: Picunches Department
- Founded: 8 February 1897

Government
  - Mayor: Maria Espinosa
- Elevation: 703 m (2,306 ft)

Population (2001 census [INDEC])
  - Total: 4,078
- Time zone: UTC−3 (ART)
- CPA Base: B 8347
- Area code: +54 02942
- Website: www.laslajas.gov.ar

Las Lajas ("The Flagstones") is a town in Neuquén Province, Argentina, and the capital of Picunches Department. The town, at an altitude of 900 metres (3,000 ft) above mean sea level, is located on the right shore of Agrio River at the Andean foothills. National Routes 22 and 40 intersect in this area of the central Neuquén Province. The Cuchillo Curá range, considered the most important underground ecosystem in Argentina, extends approximately 10 kilometres (6.2 mi) from Las Lajas.

Before the Araucanization of Patagonia, Las Lajas was originally populated by Pehuenche and Picunche natives. In 1788, the first expedition into the territory, under the command Francisco Esquivel y Aldao, reached Las Lajas. In 1882, commander Ortega established a fort for the Argentinian Army. The town was established on 8 February 1897, by General Enrique Godoy, the Argentinian Army's 4th Division commander. To take possession of the region and protect the inhabitants from the natives, the town became the headquarters of the 8th and 9th Cavalry Regiments. It was named "Las Lajas" after the creek Las Lajitas, whose bed soil is mainly composed of the stones. Governor Alsina and the inhabitants of the town requested to move the National Territory's capital from Chos Malal to Las Lajas. The capital was ultimately moved to Neuquén city in 1902. The town received its current status of second-category municipality in 1967.

The fodder production is largest agricultural activity in the region. The soils of the area remain unexplored, and for the lack of technical information, subsequently the oil and natural gas invest in locations such as Loma de La Lata. Another major aspect of the town is the Argentina Army's 21 Mountain Infantry Regiment. Following its closure of in the late 1990s, the regiment re-opened in 2004 with a diminution of the personnel to 250 soldiers as of 2011, out of an original of 1,000. This increased the number of customers and raised the solicitations for commercial licenses. The opening of the Pino Hachado Pass increased the quantity of vehicles and people that go through the town.

== History ==
Archeological evidences found at Mallín del Tromen suggest that the Picunches Department was populated at around 4500 BP. Before the Araucanization of Patagonia, which took place sometime between 1550 and 1850, this region of the current Neuquén Province was inhabited by Picunche and Pehuenches natives. In 1788, the first expedition into the territory of the current province reached the Las Lajas area under order of commander Francisco Esquivel y Aldao, who traveled 2,000 kilometres (1,243 mi) from Mendoza with his men.

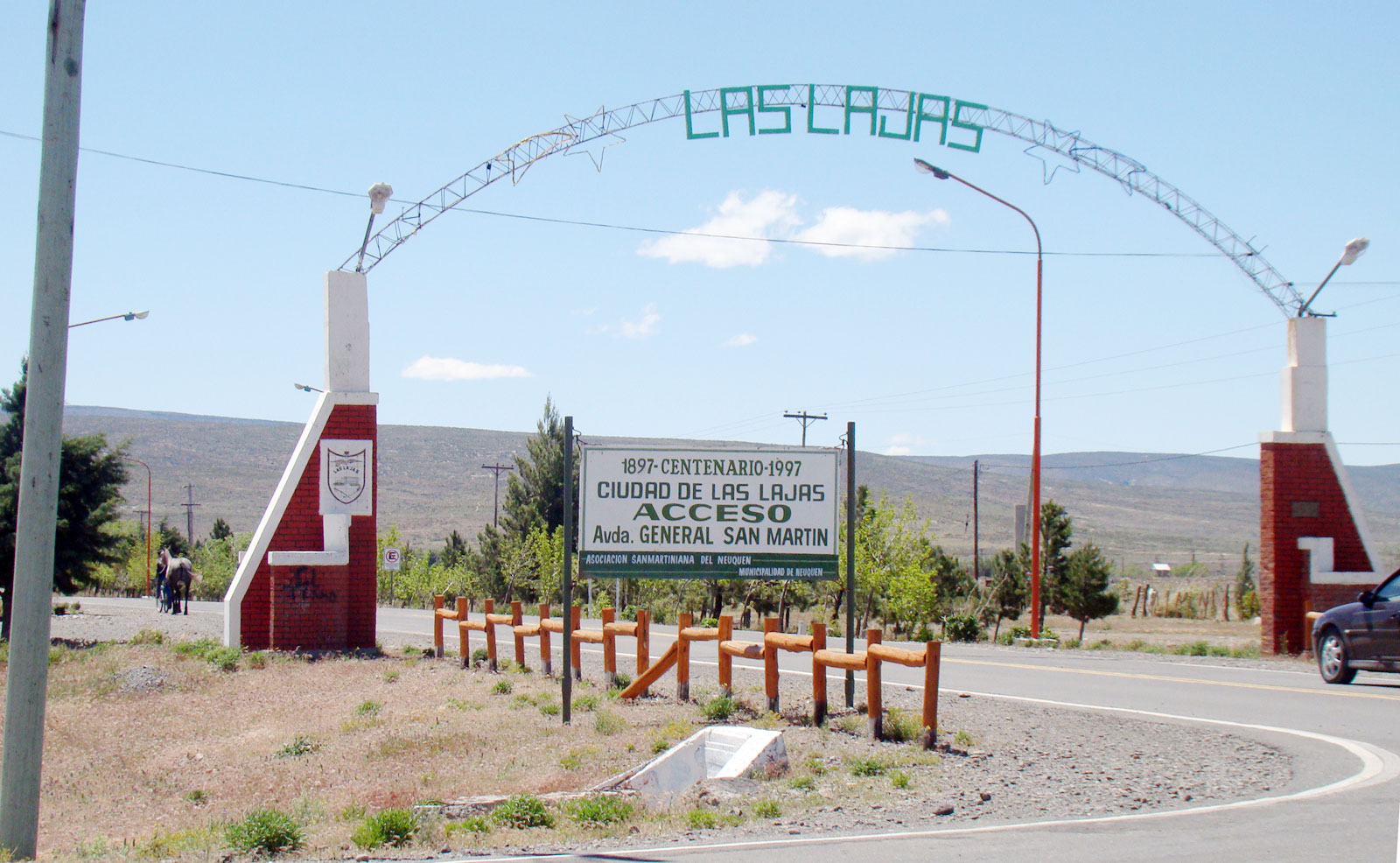
Entrance to Las Lajas

The first fort of the Argentinian army in the area was built by commander Ortega around 1882. The local postal office started working in 1886 and the telegraph arrived one year later. On 8 February 1897, the Argentinian Army's 4th Division Commander General Enrique Godoy ordered the establishment of the town as the headquarters of the 8 and 9 Cavalry Regiments. It was named Las Lajas ("The Flagstones" in Spanish) after the near creek Las Lajitas, whose bed possesses abundance of that kind of stone. The regiments were there to protect the colonists after the occupation of the native lands, and to take the control of the region. Two years later, an Agrio River flood destroyed the hamlet, which had to be reconstructed on the upper part of the valley. Those lands belonged to the later Governor Juán Alsina, who exchanged them for lands in Primeros Pinos and Pino Hachado.

The local court was opened on 23 January 1901, and the following year the first police station was established. In 1903, Governor Alsina and local ranchers wanted to move the National Territory's capital from Chos Malal to Las Lajas, predicating that its location was more accessible for the rest of the Territory's towns in comparison with the previous city. The capital was ultimately moved to Neuquén city in 1902 with the support of Carlos Governor Bouquet Roldán and landowners of the Confluencia Department.

In 1933, the province's government designated the ejido for the developing committee. Due to its sustained development, the town received its current status of second-category municipality in 1967.

In 1996, a popular but unsuccessful riot tried to prevent the closure of the 21 Mountain Infantry Regiment which was crucial to the town's economy. It remained closed for seven years until its reopening in 2004 with a considerably lower number of men in comparison to its past.

== Geography ==
Las Lajas is located on the right shore of Agrio River at the Andean foothills, where National Routes 22 and 40. The Pino Hachado Pass, which joins Argentina and Chile, is 52 kilometres (32 mi) west of the town. Las Lajas is 58 kilometres (36 mi) from Zapala, 242 kilometres (150 mi) from Neuquén City and 1,455 kilometres (904 mi) from Buenos Aires. It has an elevation 703 metres (2,306 ft) above mean sea level (AMSL). The local poorly developed soils are composed of a low percentage in organic matter. They belong to the entisol and aridisol orders of the USDA soil taxonomy. Besides the Agrio River, waterways in the area include the Las Lajitas and Liu Cullín Creeks.

=== Climate ===
Las Lajas lies within an arid area. The annual precipitation is around 311 millimetres (12 in), being the values higher during winter months. The average yearly vapor pressure values are relatively low. The average humidity values are above 60 percent during winter, while they are considerable lower during summer. The relative humidity amplitude averages 30 percent yearly. Although the town is located at the same latitude as Neuquén City, the area is higher and the temperature colder. Average temperatures range from 14 °C (57 °F) in January to 0 °C (32 °F) in July. The daily amplitude is significant, especially in summer. However, considerable interdiurnal variations occur. The highest temperature ever recorded in the area is around 40 °C (104 °F) in summer and the lowest around −16 °C (3 °F) in winter. The winds range from moderate to strong, having more intensity in the south. The main wind directions are west, northwest and southwest. The clouds cover up to 60 percent of the sky in winter and 30 percent in summer.

Climate data for Las Lajas, Neuquén (1901–1970)
Month	Jan	Feb	Mar	Apr	May	Jun	Jul	Aug	Sep	Oct	Nov	Dec	Year
Record high °C (°F)	39.2 (102.6)	40.0 (104.0)	37.0 (98.6)	33.0 (91.4)	30.5 (86.9)	25.6 (78.1)	24.2 (75.6)	29.5 (85.1)	32.4 (90.3)	33.1 (91.6)	37.6 (99.7)	39.7 (103.5)	40.0 (104.0)
Mean daily maximum °C (°F)	28.9 (84.0)	28.3 (82.9)	25.2 (77.4)	20.8 (69.4)	15.7 (60.3)	11.8 (53.2)	11.8 (53.2)	13.6 (56.5)	16.7 (62.1)	20.7 (69.3)	24.2 (75.6)	26.8 (80.2)	20.4 (68.7)
Daily mean °C (°F)	19.7 (67.5)	18.5 (65.3)	15.6 (60.1)	11.4 (52.5)	7.8 (46.0)	5.0 (41.0)	4.8 (40.6)	4.7 (40.5)	7.0 (44.6)	12.0 (53.6)	15.5 (59.9)	18.1 (64.6)	11.7 (53.1)
Mean daily minimum °C (°F)	10.5 (50.9)	9.0 (48.2)	6.7 (44.1)	3.2 (37.8)	1.2 (34.2)	−0.5 (31.1)	−1.3 (29.7)	−0.6 (30.9)	1.1 (34.0)	3.6 (38.5)	6.6 (43.9)	9.0 (48.2)	4.0 (39.2)
Record low °C (°F)	−2.4 (27.7)	−1.3 (29.7)	−6.9 (19.6)	−10.2 (13.6)	−11.5 (11.3)	−16.0 (3.2)	−15.8 (3.6)	−13.2 (8.2)	−11.6 (11.1)	−7.3 (18.9)	−4.5 (23.9)	−3.0 (26.6)	−16.0 (3.2)
Average precipitation mm (inches)	9.2 (0.36)	8.1 (0.32)	9.9 (0.39)	16.6 (0.65)	34.5 (1.36)	37.8 (1.49)	30.6 (1.20)	26.0 (1.02)	15.9 (0.63)	12.1 (0.48)	8.9 (0.35)	7.4 (0.29)	217.0 (8.54)
Average rainy days	0.8	1.0	1.5	2.5	4.0	4.5	4.0	3.0	2.0	1.5	1.5	0.6	26.9
Average snowy days	0	0	0	0	0.4	0.6	0.2	0.3	0.2	0	0	0	1.7
Average relative humidity (%)	46.3	47.8	50.8	59.3	66.5	71.5	71.5	68.8	61.0	54.5	49.5	47.0	57.9
Mean monthly sunshine hours	330	284	254	220	152	133	162	194	205	255	283	333	2,804
Percentage possible sunshine	73	75	66	66	49	47	54	59	58	63	66	72	62
Source 1: Instituto Nacional de Tecnología Agropecuaria, Secretaria de Mineria (humidity 1901–1970)
Source 2: FAO (sun only), UNLP (snowfall data)

=== Cave systems ===
The Cuchillo Curá Range extends around 10 kilometres (6 mi) from Las Lajas, on National Route 40. Located at 900 metres (2,953 ft) AMSL, it is considered the most important underground ecosystem in Argentina. The system is composed of the caves El Gendarme, El Templo, El Arenal and Los Cabritos. It possesses a gallery area of 4,800 square metres (52,000 sq ft).

The other important cave in the area is the Cueva del León, which is situated on the Crodón Curimil to 15 kilometres (9 mi) from the town. It was formed in plaster during the Late Jurassic. It is 631 metres (2,070 ft) long and consists of two chambers named the "Great Chamber" and "Chamber of the Lake".

== Demographics ==
The 1991 Argentinian census registered a total of 3,428 inhabitants in Las Lajas. The quantity increased by 7.8%, reaching the 4,673 in 2001. As of 2010, it was estimated that the town had a permanent population of 4,673, which increased up to 7,000 if non-permanent residents were considered.

== Economy ==
The fodder production is largest agricultural activity in the region. It is recognized by the quality of its grass, especially of the alfalfa. Villa Rural San Demetrio and Colonia Juán Ignacio Alsina are the main establishments.

The closing of Argentina Army's 21 Mountain Infantry in the late 1990s caused the closure of businesses and emigration of inhabitants to other towns. In 2004, the Regiment was reopened increasing the people flux around local businesses by 20 percent and commercial licenses quantity by 12 percent. Although the Regiment's positive impact on the town's economy, it produced a lower income with a personnel of 250 soldiers as of 2011 in comparison to the 1,000 men who served there prior to its closure. The opening of the Pino Hachado Pass increased the quantity of vehicles and people that go through the town.

Since the area's soil remains unexplored and lacks availability of technical information, the oil and natural gas companies opt for investing in known and traditional locations like Loma de La Lata.

The town's economy saw itself benefited by the installment of the CNSA Espacio Lejano deep space station, located in Bajada del Agrio, about 60 km on the provincial route 33. Over 300 local workers were employed for its construction. Although the Chinese staff of the station rarely visits the town, María Espinosa, the mayor by 2019, noted that the facilities have had a positive impact on the local economy.

== Tourism ==
Las Lajas is a hub for travelers that head to some of the province's touristic spots, including the northern hot springs' area in the municipality of Caviahue-Copahue, as well as the ones headed to Chile through the Pino Hachado Pass. The area offers possibilities to practice different activities both in summer and winter, such as hiking, fishing, camping and skiing. Its natural surroundings include an Araucaria forest, the Cuchillo Curá cave system and the Agrio river. In Las Lajas work accommodation facilities and other services for tourists like bars and restaurants.

There are a number of attractions in Las Lajas. Among them is a local museum at the junction between the National Route 22 and the Avenida del Trabajador Street. It exhibits historic objects and archaeological pieces. And, since Las Lajas is a speleology center, the museum also exhibits photos of the Cuchillo Curá y Cueva del León cave systems. During October and November, cultural meetings gather musicians, poets, painters and other kinds of artists. The shores of the Agrio River and of the Liu Cullín and Las Lajitas creeks are popular spots for camping and fishing. During winter months it is possible to ski in the slopes of the near snowpark. Every year in April the Grass Festival, which honors the farmers dedicated to the fodder crop, is held. During the Festival, local meals and artwork are sold, and night folk music spectacles are celebrated.

== See also ==
- Chinese space program
