= Las Raíces Tunnel =

Road tunnel in Chile

Coordinates: 38.5180°S 71.5163°W

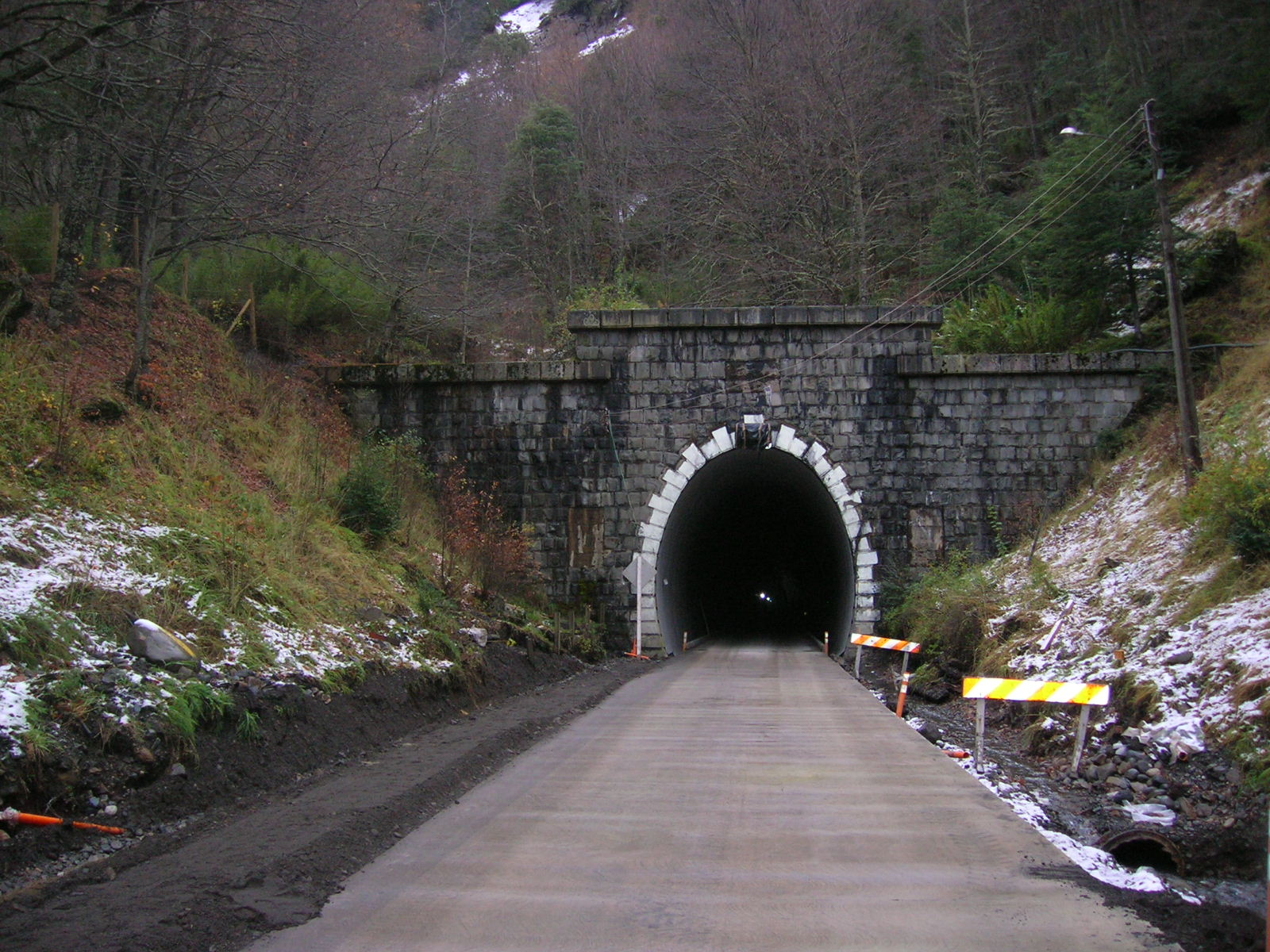
Entrance to Las Raíces Tunnel

Las Raíces Tunnel (Spanish: Túnel Las Raíces) is a road tunnel in Chile.

It is the longest of the very few tunnels in the southern Andes and is the second longest of South America (after the 2006 inauguration of the 4,600-metre (15,100 ft) long tunnel Fernando Gómez Martínez in Colombia). It is located about 700 kilometres (430 mi) south of Santiago de Chile on the paved Route 181-CH connecting the city of Temuco with the pass Pino Hachado towards Argentina. As such, the tunnel serves as a link between the Pacific and Atlantic Oceans, from Lebu in Chile to Bahía Blanca in Argentina. It is 4,528 metres (14,856 ft) long, located 1,010 metres (3,310 ft) above sea level and was inaugurated in 1939.

This tunnel allows only one-way traffic, which is regulated by a toll station where a fee of 400 Chilean pesos (0.53 USD) per car is charged. Its average traffic is about 450 vehicles daily, including some heavy fuel trucks coming from Argentina. An alternative to this tunnel is the old scenic gravel road Cuesta de Las Raíces to be taken northwards about 5 kilometres (3.1 mi) before the western or 11 kilometres (6.8 mi) before the eastern entrance.

Feasibility studies began in 1911, with final blueprints ready in 1929. Construction began in 1930 and lasted eight years, with an investment of more than 32 million Chilean pesos of that time. It is 4.2 metres (14 ft) wide and 5.6 metres (18 ft) high. The railway from Púa to Lonquimay operated through it from 1956 until the 1990s.

== Sources ==
- http://edelect.latercera.cl/medio/articulo/0,0,3255_5666_107831743,00.html
- https://web.archive.org/web/20080317071727/http://lonquimay.relacionarse.com/index.php/147146
