= Piedra Santa =

Coordinates: 38°28′0.78″S 71°36′1.39″W

Piedra Santa is a large rock outcrop near Malalcahuello in Araucanía Region, Chile. It is best known for folklore and folk Catholicism associated to it. Piedra Santa is said to be a Mapuche princess, and the daughter of great warrior, turned into rock. People who travel between Curacautín and Lonquimay stop at Piedra Santa to deposit food and other gifts in order to "feed" the princess.

== See also ==
- List of individual rocks
- Chile Route 181
