= Bajada del Agrio =

- Municipality and village
- Location within Neuquén Province Location within Argentina
- Coordinates: 38°23′S 70°02′W
- Country: Argentina
- Province: Neuquén Province
- Department: Picunches
- Municipality: Bajada del Agrio
- Established: 26 October 1939

Government
  - Type: Municipio de 3ra categoría
  - Mayor: Ricardo Concha Esparza (MPN)

Area
  - Total: 32.53 sq mi (84.25 km^{2})
- Elevation: 2,365 ft (721 m)

Population (2020)
  - Total: 883 (est)
- Time zone: UTC−3 (ART)
- Postal code: Q8351
- Area code: 02942
- Climate: BSk
- Website: www.laslajas.gov.ar/

Bajada del Agrio is a village and municipality in the Picunches department in Neuquén Province in southwestern Argentina. It is located on the Agrio River, a tributary of the Neuquén River, 60 km north of Zapala through Provincial Route (RP) 14, is also close to the RP 10 and RN 40.

== Population ==
Bajada del Agrio had an estimated number of 883 inhabitants (Estadistica y Censos del gobierno de la Provincia del Neuquén, 2020), which represented an increase of 34% over the previous census when there were 656 inhabitants (INDEC, 2001).
