= Qitai Radio Telescope =

Planned Chinese radio telescope

- Alternative names: QTT
- Location: Qitai County, Changji Hui Autonomous Prefecture, Xinjiang, PRC
- Coordinates: 43°36′04″N 89°40′57″E
- Altitude: 1,800 m (5,900 ft)
- Diameter: 110 m (360 ft 11 in)
- Website: qtt.xao.cas.cn/xmjj/
- Location within China

The Xinjiang Qitai 120m Radio Telescope (QTT) is a planned radio telescope to be built in Qitai County in Xinjiang, China. Upon completion, which is scheduled for 2028, it will be the world's largest fully steerable single-dish radio telescope. It is intended to operate at 150 MHz to 115 GHz. The construction of the antenna project is under the leadership of the Xinjiang Astronomical Observatory of the Chinese Academy of Sciences.

The fully steerable dish of the QTT will allow it to observe 75% of the stars in the sky at any given time. The QTT and the Five-hundred-meter Aperture Spherical Telescope (FAST), also located in China, can both observe frequencies in the "water hole" that has traditionally been favored by scientists engaged in the Search for Extraterrestrial Intelligence (SETI), meaning that each observatory could provide follow-up observations of putative signals from extraterrestrials detected in this quiet part of the radio spectrum at the other observatory.

The radio telescope site selection team considered 48 candidate locations throughout Xinjiang. The chosen site for the facility is in the foothills of the Tian Shan mountains, near Shihezi village, Banjiegou Town, about 46 km (straight-line distance) south-south-east of the Qitai county seat (Qitai Town). The mountain ridges surrounding the site are supposed to provide some protection from electromagnetic noise. The authorities propose designating a radio quiet zone (a 10 km by 15 km rectangle, much smaller than the United States National Radio Quiet Zone) around the future facility. A paper from October 2023 stated that a radio quiet zone with a radius of 30 km will be established. The zone will have a core zone (2.5x4 km), restricted zone (10x15 km) and coordination zone (r=30 km) with reducing control levels.

China started to build the QTT in September 2022 and it will take six years to complete the telescope. As of June 2025 the main pedestal was complete.

== Antenna ==
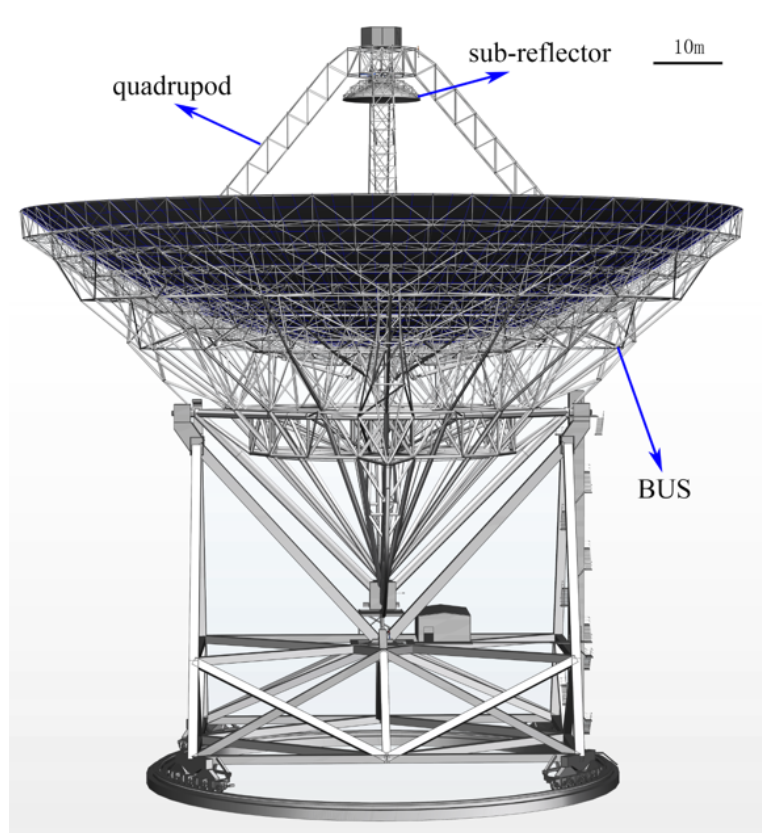
3D model of the QTT, published by Wang et al. 2023

The QTT is a Gregorian parabolic antenna with an active main surface to correct the deformation caused by gravity. The antenna has an azimuth-elevation structure on a wheel-and-track mount. The back of the antenna has design similarities to the umbrella-like structure of the Eiffelsberg telescope. To reduce dead load and thermal deformation, the sub-reflector will use carbon fiber-reinforced plastic. The telescope can switch between Gregorian and primary focus. For the primary focus it uses the prime focus platform (PFP). The PFP is aligned to one of the quadruple legs in stow mode and it is moved horizontally over the sub-reflector in primary operation mode. The PFP contains receivers and auxiliary equipment. To access the telescope an elevator, stairs, catwalks, platforms and a crane are part of the antenna.

== Receivers ==
The QTT will contain broadband, ultra wide-band (UWB), multi-beam and phased array feeds (PAF) low-noise cryogenic receivers from 40 cm to 3 mm bands, all linearly polarized. Currently only 40 cm to 1.3 cm receivers are planned.

Receivers
Type	Band (cm)	Radio Frequency (GHz)	Focus	T_{sys} (K)
Single Beam	40	0.27-1.8	Primary	20
Single Beam	15	0.7-4	Primary	16
Single Beam	5	4-16	Gregory	18
Single Beam	1.3	16-30	Gregory	20
PAF	20	0.7-1.8	Primary	20

== Goals ==
The main goals of the QTT include imaging of pulsars, stellar formation, and the large-scale radio structure of the universe. Other goals are the use of Pulsar Timing Arrays to detect nanoHertz gravitational waves, to be part of Very Long Baseline Interferometry, to study the interstellar medium, to study galaxies and black holes, to study dark matter and to carry out astrometry.

== Similar fully steerable telescopes ==
- Green Bank Telescope, the current largest fully steerable parabolic dish wideband radio telescope, of similar capabilities and 110m x 100m elliptical aperture
- Effelsberg 100-m Radio Telescope
- The three NASA Deep Space Network stations each sport a fully steerable 70m dish telescope, and the counterpart Soviet Deep Space Network likewise uses the comparable 70m aperture RT-70 line
- The Usuda Deep Space Center of Japan has 64 and 54 meter fully steerable antennas.

== See also ==
- List of radio telescopes
