= Pino Hachado Pass =

Mountain pass through the Andes joining Chile and Argentina

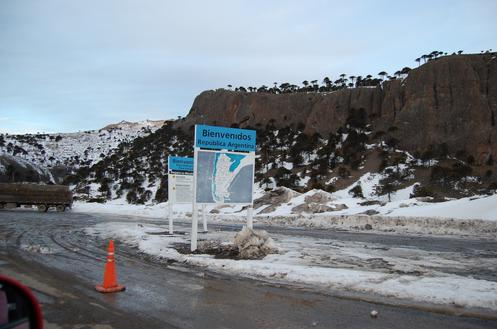
- Image of Argentine customs at Pino Hachado Pass
- Interactive map of Pino Hachado Pass
- Elevation: 1,884 metres (6,181 ft)

Third Approach
- Location: Argentina–Chile border
- Range: Andes
- Coordinates: 38°39′S 70°53′W

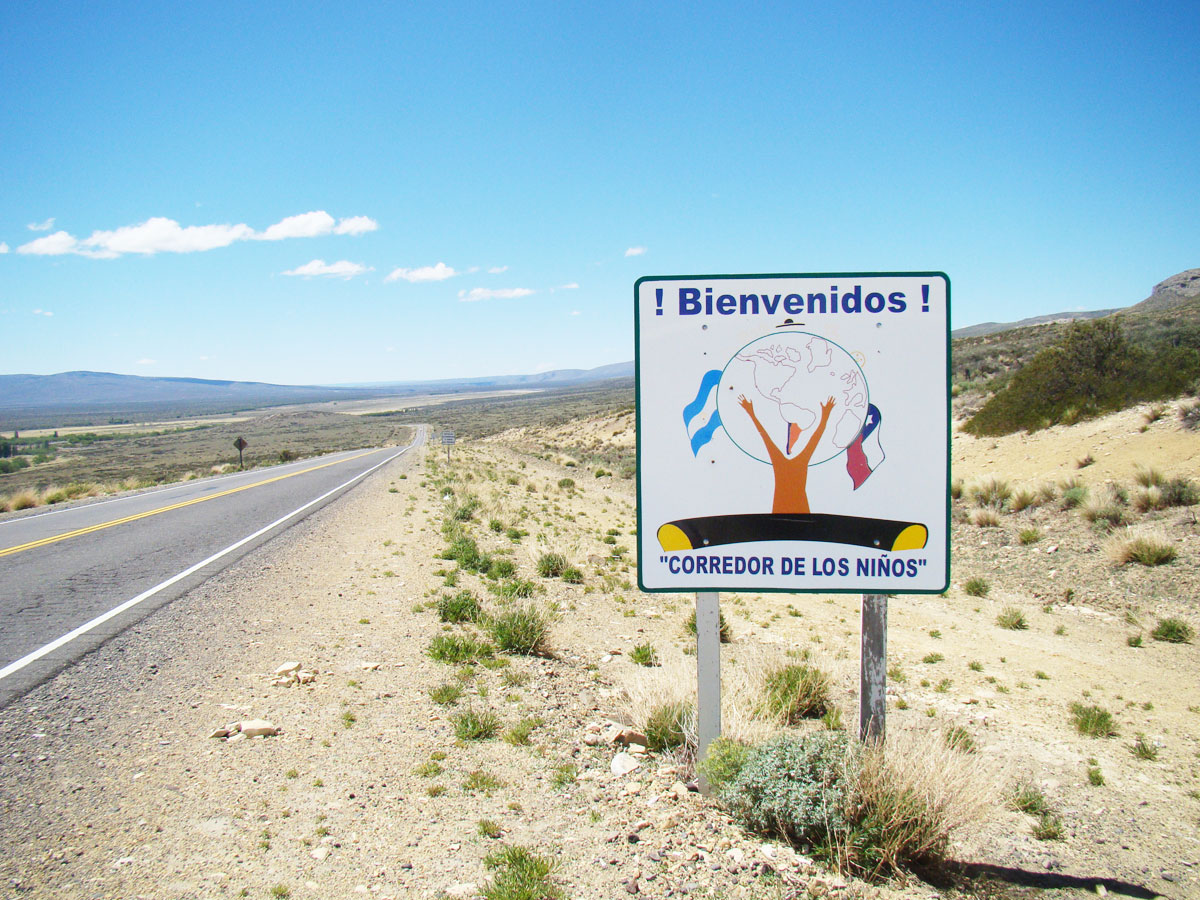
El Corridor de los Niños, Pino Hachado Pass

Pino Hachado Pass (Spanish: Paso Pino Hachado) is a mountain pass through the Andes, joining Chile and Argentina. It is one of the principal passes of the southern Andes, connecting Argentina's route RN-242 and Chile's Route 181-CH.

Transit must pass through Las Raíces Tunnel, on the Chilean side. At its highest peak, Pino Hachado Pass is 1884 meters high. The climate is cold and dry, with summer temperatures recorded at 25 °C/77 °F, and winter temperatures recorded at -15 °C/5 °F. The closest inhabited locations are Las Lajas in Argentina, with approximately 5,000 inhabitants, and Liucura in Chile, with approximately 700 inhabitants. Both Las Lajas and Liucura communities have organized a project called El Corredor de los Niños (The Children's Corridor). This program is focused on uniting school children from both communities and teaching them the value of protecting the route, both environmentally and in the control of transports. In order to pass Pino Hachado, travelers must stop at both the Chilean and Argentinian customs and immigration services.
