= Picunches Department =

Coordinates: 38°31′24″S 70°21′42″W

Picunches
- Department
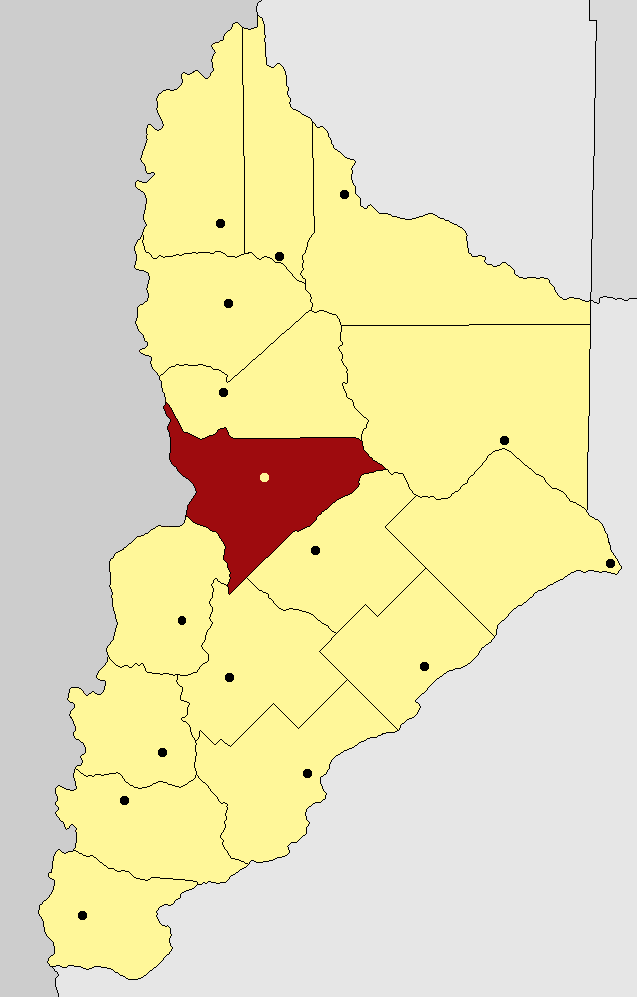
- Country: Argentina
- Province: Neuquén
- Capital: Las Lajas

Area
  - Total: 5,913 km^{2} (2,283 sq mi)

Population (2022)
  - Total: 8,495
  - Density: 1.437/km^{2} (3.721/sq mi)
- Important cities: Las Lajas: Agrio del Medio; Bajada del Agrio; La Buitrera; Mallin Quemado; Quili Malal; Villa del Agrio; Peña Haichol

Picunches is a department located in the west of Neuquén Province, Argentina.

== Geography ==
The Department is surrounded by Loncopué Department in the north, Confluencia Department in the northeast, Zapala Department in the southwest, Catán Lil Department in the south, Aluminé Department in the southwest and Chile in the west.
