= Primeval Structure Telescope =

Chinese radio telescope

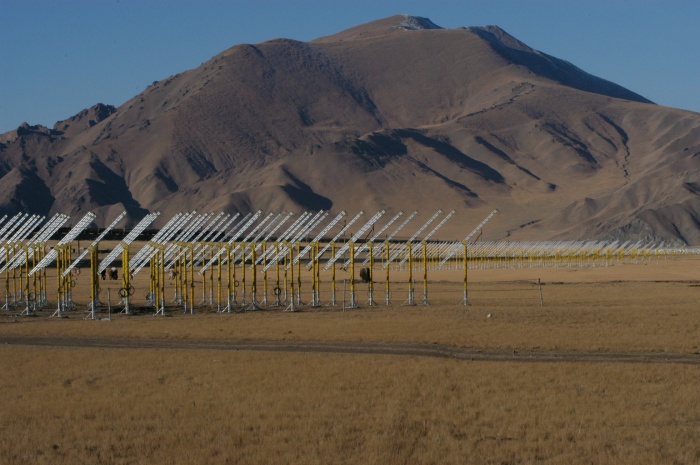
- 21CMA pods pointing to the north celestial pole
- Location: Xinjiang, PRC
- Coordinates: 42°55′27″N 86°42′58″E
- Altitude: 2,500 m (8,200 ft)
- Website: 21cma.bao.ac.cn
- Location within China
- Related media on Commons

The Primeval Structure Telescope (PaST), also called 21 Centimetre Array (21CMA), is a Chinese radio telescope array designed to detect the earliest luminous objects in the universe, including the first stars, supernova explosions, and black holes, in the range of 100 to 1 billion years ago. All of these objects were strong sources of ultraviolet radiation, so they ionised the material surrounding them. The structure of this reionisation reflects the overall density structure at the redshift of luminous-object formation.

== Location ==
The telescope is built on the high plateau of Ulasitai (Chinese: 乌拉斯台) in Xinjiang, close to the southern entrance of the Tianshan Shengli tunnel. This is a remote area away from most television and radios signals that may interfere the weak 21 cm background signals. It is also close to the existing Urumqi VLBI station (Nanshan Observatory) in Gangou township.

== Overview ==
PaST consists of an array of some ten-thousand log-periodic antennas spread over several square kilometers. It will capture a detailed radio image of the sky in the range of 1420 MHz.

The first stars ionized the gas around them, which produced a specific pattern of ionization. PasT detects the brightness of the 21 cm hydrogen line at redshift from 6 to 25. This hydrogen cosmic background radiation disappears on ionization, allowing the study of large scale structure and of star formation at this very early epoch.

== Hardware ==
PaST's detection antennas are located over an area measuring several km². The redshift of 6 to 25 corresponds to a frequency range of 200 MHz to 50 MHz. Despite the remote location, some man-made frequency lines are to be filtered out.

At 100 MHz, the telescope covers an area of the sky of 3 arcminutes.

For detection, PaST's antennas use 20 off-the-shelf interferometers and a total of 10,000 antennae.

== See also ==
- List of radio telescopes
- Five-hundred-meter Aperture Spherical Telescope
