= Caviahue-Copahue =

- Municipality and village
- Location within Neuquén Province Location within Argentina
- Coordinates: 37°49′06″S 71°05′47″W
- Country: Argentina
- Province: Neuquén Province
- Time zone: UTC−3 (ART)

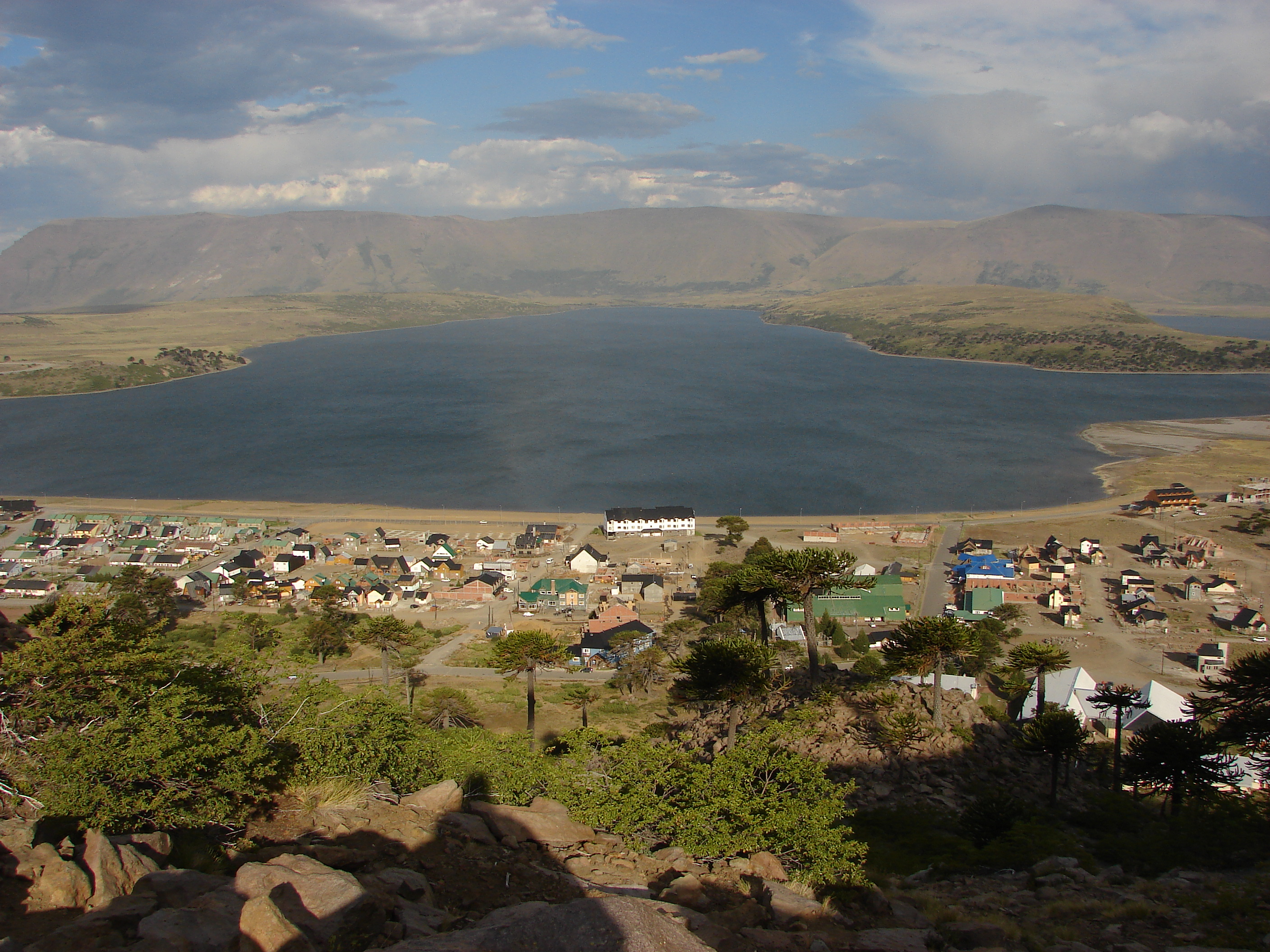
Caviahue

Caviahue-Copahue is a village and municipality in Neuquén Province in southwestern Argentina.
