= Chile Route 181 =

Highway in Chile

Route 181
- Ruta 181
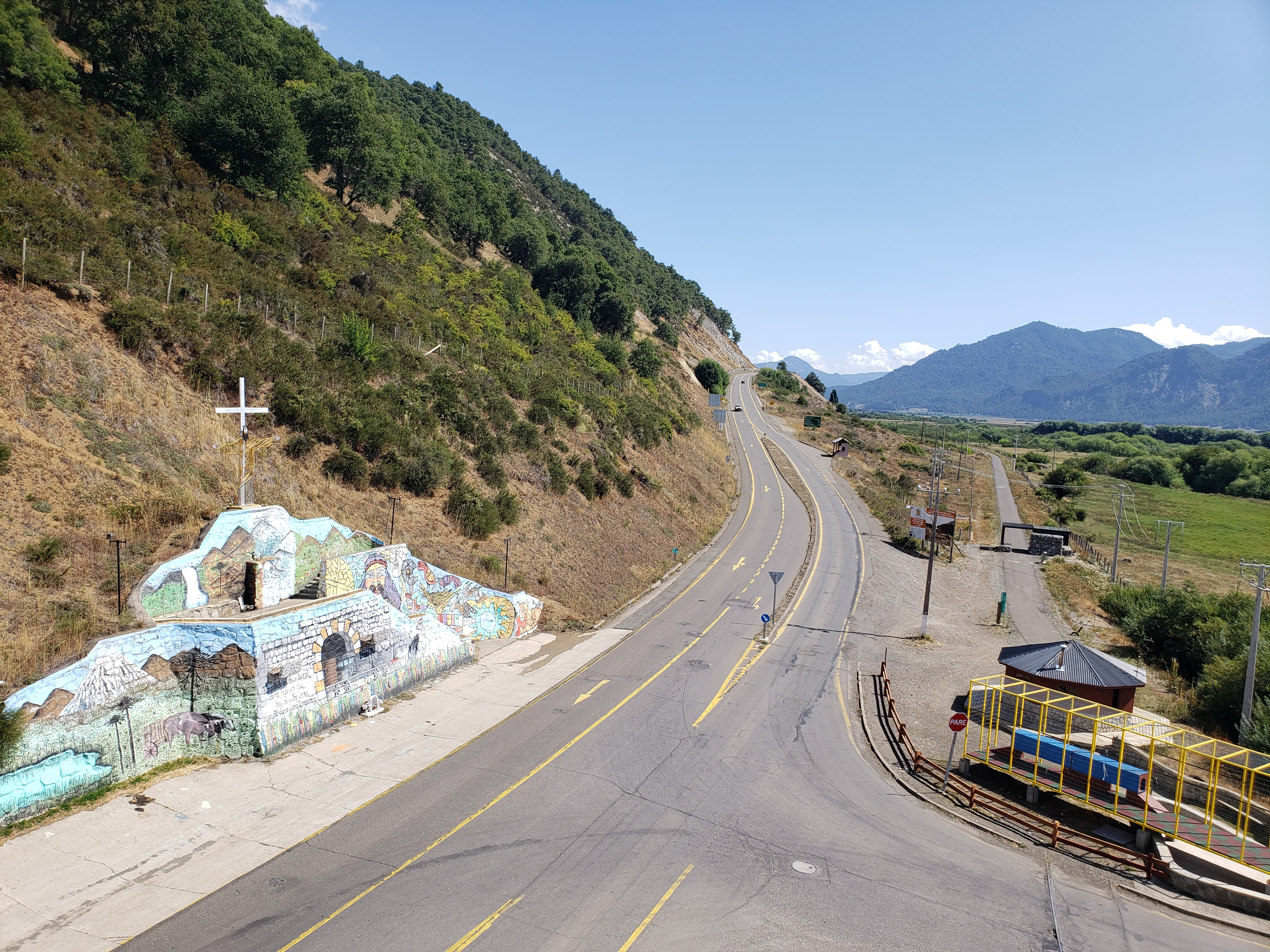
- Route 181-CH next to the town of Lonquimay.

Location
- Country: Chile

Highway system
- Highways in Chile

Route 181-CH is a branch line road going eastward from Chile Highway 5 at Victoria to Pino Hachado Pass at the border to Argentina. Through its length the road passes along or close to the cities and towns of Victoria and Lonquimay. All of the route runs inside La Araucanía Region and between Curacautín and Lonquimay the road runs through Las Raíces Tunnel, Chile's longest tunnel.

== See also ==
- Piedra Santa
