= Qitai County =

Qitai County 奇台县 (Chinese) گۇچۇڭ ناھىيىسى (Uyghur) Kitai, Gucheng
- County
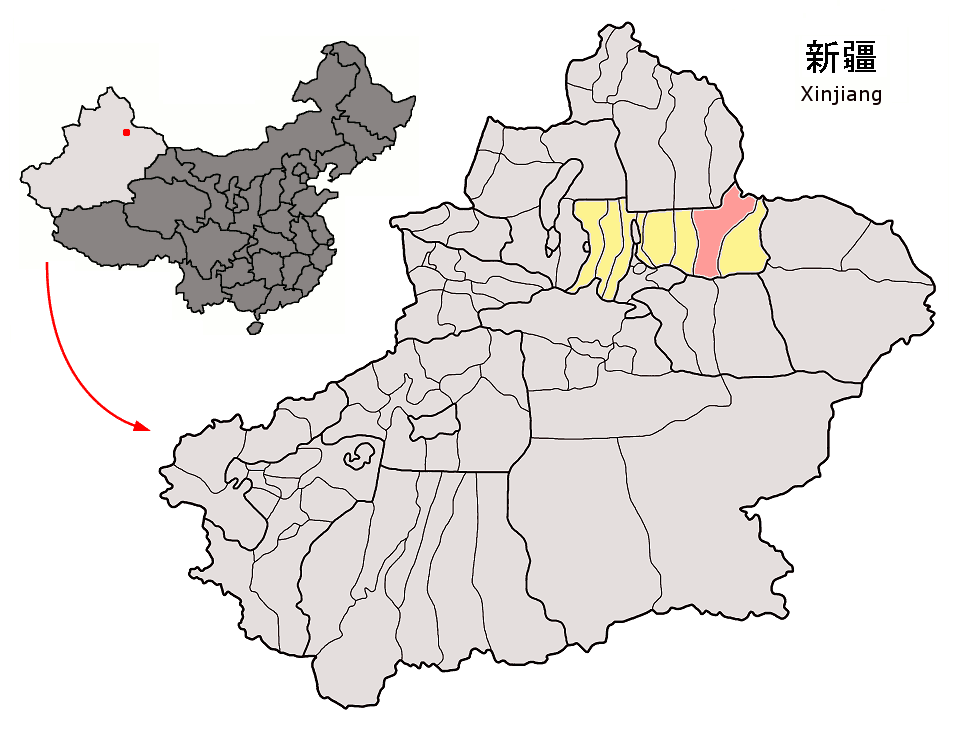
- Location of Qitai (pink) in Changji Prefecture (yellow) and Xinjiang

- Location in Xinjiang Qitai (China)
- Coordinates: 44°01′N 89°35′E
- Country: China
- Region: Xinjiang
- Autonomous prefecture: Changji
- County seat: Qitai Town

Area
  - Total: 16,645 km^{2} (6,427 sq mi)

Population (2020)
  - Total: 219,811
  - Density: 13.206/km^{2} (34.203/sq mi)
- Time zone: UTC+8 (China Standard (Note: Locals in Xinjiang frequently observe UTC+6 (Xinjiang Time), 2 hours behind Beijing.))
- Area code: 0994
- Website: www.xjqt.gov.cn

Qitai County

Chinese name
- Simplified Chinese: 奇台县
- Traditional Chinese: 奇台縣
Transcriptions
Standard Mandarin
- Hanyu Pinyin: Qítái Xiàn
other Mandarin
- Xiao'erjing: کِ‌تَیْ ثِیًا

Alternative Chinese name
- Simplified Chinese: 古城县
- Traditional Chinese: 古城縣
Transcriptions
Standard Mandarin
- Hanyu Pinyin: Gǔchéng Xiàn
other Mandarin
- Xiao'erjing: قُ‌چٍْ ثِیًا

Uyghur name
- Uyghur: گۇچۇڭ ناھىيىسى
Transcriptions
- Latin Yëziqi: Guchung Nahiyisi
- Yengi Yeziⱪ: Guqung Naⱨiyisi
- SASM/GNC: Guqung Nahiyisi
- Siril Yëziqi: Гучуғ Нахийиси

Qitai County (Chinese: 奇台县), also known as Gucheng County (Chinese: 古城县; Uyghur: گۇچۇڭ ناھىيىسى), is a county in the Xinjiang Uyghur Autonomous Region of China under the administration of the Changji Hui Autonomous Prefecture. It covers an area of 16,641 square kilometres (6,425 sq mi) and as of the 2002 census had a population of 230,000.

Qitai County's county seat is in Qitai Town. Gucheng Township is nearby.

== Name ==
There are several theories regarding the origin of the place name "Qitai." One explanation is that in the 24th year of the Qianlong reign of the Qing Dynasty (1759 AD), seven fortresses were built in what is now Laoqitai Town, Qitai County. This seventh fortress east of Ürümqi was called "Qitai" (Seven Fortresses). Since the Chinese characters for "seven" (七, qī) and "strange/unique" (奇, qí) are homophones, the name later evolved into "Qitai." Another theory is that in the old county seat (now Laoqitai Town), due to water shortages, every household dug wells with uniquely shaped "well platforms" called "qi" (奇), which was later abbreviated as Qitai. A third theory suggests that "Qitai" is a transliteration of "Khitan" (契丹), a historic ethnic group.

== History ==
In 119 BC (4th year of Emperor Wu's Yuanshou era), Zhang Qian led his second mission to the Western Regions, opening diplomatic relations with states such as Wusun and Dayuan.

By 68 BC (2nd year of Emperor Xuan's Dijing era), General Zheng Ji conquered Jushi, and the region came under Han control; the Han government then established agricultural colonies and administrative offices.

In 629 AD (14th year of Tang Taizong's Zhenguan), General Li Jing led a successful campaign against the Eastern Turks, after which the Tang dynasty solidified its control over the northern silk route.

In 640 AD, under Tang Zhenguan 14, Pulai County (蒲类县) was established northwest of modern Qitai, under Tingzhou prefecture; by 702 AD, it fell under the Northern Protectorate administration, and by 732 AD the post of military governor was permanently stationed there.

Located on one of the main routes of the Silk Road, the old Gucheng (often referred in the European writing of the past as "Ku Ch'eng-tze", Kucheng, Kuchengtze, etc., using Wade-Giles or Postal Romanization systems), was the western terminal for one of the caravan routes across the Gobi Desert. Owen Lattimore in The Desert Road to Turkestan leaves an account of his travel along this route in 1926–27.

"Under the special circumstances of the caravan trade, camel traffic usually overshoots Hami ["the most easterly point on the arterial cart roads of Chinese Turkestan"], going on all the way to Ku Ch'eng-tze. This is partly because the pastures near Ku Ch'eng-tze are more adequate to caravan needs, but still more because, transport being cheaper by camel than by cart, it is to the advantage of merchants to have their goods carried as far as possible by caravan."

Qitai briefly held city status. In 1953, the Xinjiang Provincial Government—before the region became an autonomous region—promoted the county seat of populous Qitai County to "Qitai City." However, following the 20 September 1954 Constitution of the People's Republic of China, which required all local governments to establish revolutionary committees, the autonomous region abolished the City People's Government in 1956. Qitai Town People's Committee was created, administering the town's 12 subdistricts reorganized into 10 residents' committees, under the Qitai County People's Committee. Since then, Qitai City has ceased to exist.

Qitai has long been a place of multi-century Han Chinese settlement. The local dialect, often referred to as Xinjiang Mandarin or Xinjiang topolect, is considered a highly representative example of Mandarin in Xinjiang. It has been widely used in the region and even featured in performances by famed local sketch comedian Zhao Guozhu, whose "Xinjiang Sketches" are based on the Qitai dialect—earning the county a reputation as a center of Han cultural development in Xinjiang.

In the Cold War era, the United States established a station near Qitai to monitor Soviet nuclear and missile tests, replacing its former station in Iran.

== Climate ==
Climate data for Qitai, elevation 794 m (2,605 ft), (1991–2020 normals, extremes 1971–2010)
Month	Jan	Feb	Mar	Apr	May	Jun	Jul	Aug	Sep	Oct	Nov	Dec	Year
Record high °C (°F)	5.1 (41.2)	7.7 (45.9)	26.0 (78.8)	34.5 (94.1)	36.0 (96.8)	37.6 (99.7)	39.1 (102.4)	40.5 (104.9)	36.1 (97.0)	30.3 (86.5)	25.1 (77.2)	12.4 (54.3)	40.5 (104.9)
Mean daily maximum °C (°F)	−8.9 (16.0)	−4.9 (23.2)	5.8 (42.4)	18.9 (66.0)	24.8 (76.6)	29.3 (84.7)	31.0 (87.8)	30.2 (86.4)	24.6 (76.3)	15.5 (59.9)	3.7 (38.7)	−6.4 (20.5)	13.6 (56.5)
Daily mean °C (°F)	−17.3 (0.9)	−13.0 (8.6)	−1.2 (29.8)	10.8 (51.4)	16.9 (62.4)	21.6 (70.9)	23.1 (73.6)	21.7 (71.1)	15.7 (60.3)	7.1 (44.8)	−3.2 (26.2)	−13.7 (7.3)	5.7 (42.3)
Mean daily minimum °C (°F)	−23.5 (−10.3)	−19.9 (−3.8)	−7.3 (18.9)	3.6 (38.5)	9.3 (48.7)	14.0 (57.2)	15.6 (60.1)	14.0 (57.2)	8.3 (46.9)	1.0 (33.8)	−8.2 (17.2)	−19.4 (−2.9)	−1.0 (30.1)
Record low °C (°F)	−35.5 (−31.9)	−37.6 (−35.7)	−31.4 (−24.5)	−13.7 (7.3)	−3.0 (26.6)	2.2 (36.0)	6.8 (44.2)	0.1 (32.2)	−3.5 (25.7)	−12.9 (8.8)	−31.9 (−25.4)	−40.1 (−40.2)	−40.1 (−40.2)
Average precipitation mm (inches)	7.5 (0.30)	7.1 (0.28)	11.1 (0.44)	18.7 (0.74)	23.0 (0.91)	23.0 (0.91)	34.4 (1.35)	27.7 (1.09)	18.0 (0.71)	15.4 (0.61)	14.1 (0.56)	11.7 (0.46)	211.7 (8.36)
Average precipitation days (≥ 0.1 mm)	7.3	6.1	4.8	5.9	6.2	6.4	7.5	6.3	4.2	4.3	6.5	8.2	73.7
Average snowy days	15.4	12.4	6.3	2.3	0.2	0	0	0	0.1	1.6	8.1	15.5	61.9
Average relative humidity (%)	77	77	70	49	45	48	52	50	49	59	74	79	61
Mean monthly sunshine hours	144.8	171.2	238.9	265.9	303.4	301.4	300.5	298.0	274.0	240.6	168.2	127.4	2,834.3
Percentage possible sunshine	50	57	64	65	66	65	65	70	75	72	59	46	63
Source 1: China Meteorological Administration
Source 2: Weather China

Climate data for Beitashan, Qitai County, elevation 1,654 m (5,427 ft), (1991–2020 normals)
Month	Jan	Feb	Mar	Apr	May	Jun	Jul	Aug	Sep	Oct	Nov	Dec	Year
Mean daily maximum °C (°F)	−6.9 (19.6)	−4.0 (24.8)	1.9 (35.4)	11.1 (52.0)	17.3 (63.1)	22.8 (73.0)	24.6 (76.3)	23.4 (74.1)	17.5 (63.5)	9.1 (48.4)	0.5 (32.9)	−5.3 (22.5)	9.3 (48.8)
Daily mean °C (°F)	−12.4 (9.7)	−10.1 (13.8)	−4.1 (24.6)	4.9 (40.8)	11.1 (52.0)	16.9 (62.4)	18.7 (65.7)	17.2 (63.0)	11.2 (52.2)	3.2 (37.8)	−5.0 (23.0)	−10.5 (13.1)	3.4 (38.2)
Mean daily minimum °C (°F)	−17.5 (0.5)	−15.3 (4.5)	−9.1 (15.6)	−0.1 (31.8)	5.4 (41.7)	11.1 (52.0)	13.2 (55.8)	11.8 (53.2)	6.1 (43.0)	−1.1 (30.0)	−9.5 (14.9)	−15.4 (4.3)	−1.7 (28.9)
Average precipitation mm (inches)	5.2 (0.20)	5.8 (0.23)	8.8 (0.35)	15.8 (0.62)	18.9 (0.74)	24.0 (0.94)	39.4 (1.55)	25.0 (0.98)	12.8 (0.50)	13.6 (0.54)	15.1 (0.59)	7.3 (0.29)	191.7 (7.53)
Average precipitation days (≥ 0.1 mm)	5.5	5.4	6.1	6.1	5.5	6.4	9.2	6.7	5.0	5.7	7.7	6.9	76.2
Average snowy days	8.3	8.0	9.1	5.6	2.4	0.1	0.0	0.1	1.2	6.6	10.0	9.8	61.2
Average relative humidity (%)	56	56	54	46	41	42	46	43	42	50	57	57	49
Mean monthly sunshine hours	194.7	208.5	254.8	262.9	303.2	296.2	295.5	294.7	270.6	231.5	180.4	176.2	2,969.2
Percentage possible sunshine	68	70	68	64	65	63	63	69	74	70	65	65	67
Source: China Meteorological Administration

== Economy ==
Qitai County is the leading grain producer in Xinjiang, ranks second in cultivated land area, and leads in flour and meat production. The county has approximately 2.5 million mu (≈166,700 ha) of arable land, with 1.89 million mu (≈126,000 ha) sown in 2012—the second-highest in Xinjiang after Shache County in Kashgar Prefecture. Its cultivated area exceeds that of Ürümqi, Bayingolin, Kizilsu, Turpan, and Hami combined. Annually, Qitai produces over 800 million kilograms of grain—accounting for one-third of Changji Prefecture's output and one-sixth of Xinjiang's total—and is designated as a national-level major grain-producing county.

Qitai is also known as the "Hometown of Chinese Snacks"—its guoyourou (fried pork) noodles are popular across Xinjiang, and Qitai yellow noodles are sold in every major city in the region. The county is likewise renowned as a "Liquor Hometown": Gucheng Liquor, produced locally, has earned national recognition as a "China Time-honored Brand" and a "Historical and Cultural Famous Liquor," winning gold at the 2nd International Wine Culture Festival. It also serves as the "master" distillery for Xinjiang Ilite Liquor Co.

The county is also nationally famous for its dinosaur fossils and petrified wood. In 2019, the largest-known Asian specimen of Mamenchisaurus—the "Qitai Yellow River Giant"—was excavated there. In 2020, the "Qitai Dino Park" opened to the public. Tourist attractions like scenic Jiangbulak, the Tianshan Strange Slope (a Guinness World Record site), and the Han-era Shule Ancient City draw large seasonal crowds—during peak season, traffic jams occur on the Ürümqi–Qitai Expressway.

Qitai is also rich in mineral resources, including coal, granite, iron, gold, silver, copper, mirabilite, graphite, limestone, bentonite, and perlite among more than 20 types. In particular, the coal reserves in Qitai—part of the Jundong coalfield—are estimated at 280.8 billion tonnes, making it the county with the largest coal reserves in China, surpassing Shenmu (50 bill.), Fugu (20 bill.) in Shaanxi and Ordos (169.6 bill.) in Inner Mongolia. The county's granite reserves are also substantial, estimated at 3 billion m^{3}

== Subdivisions ==
Qitai County is made up of 9 towns, 3 townships, and 3 ethnic townships.

Name	Simplified Chinese	Hanyu Pinyin	Uyghur (UEY)	Uyghur Latin (ULY)	Administrative division code	Notes
Towns
Qitai Town	奇台镇	Qítái Zhèn	گۇچۇڭ بازىرى	guchung baziri	652325100	
Laoqitai Town	老奇台镇	Lǎoqítái Zhèn	لوچىتەي بازىرى (كونا گۇچۇڭ بازىرى)	lochitey baziri (kona guchung baziri)	652325101	
Banjiegou Town	半截沟镇	Bànjiégōu Zhèn	بەنجەگۇ بازىرى	benjegu baziri	652325102	
Jebki Town	吉布库镇	Jíbùkù Zhèn	جېبكى بازىرى	jëbki baziri	652325103	
Dongwan Town	东湾镇	Dōngwān Zhèn	دۇڭۋەن بازىرى	dungwen baziri	652325104	
Xidi Town	西地镇	Xīdì Zhèn	شىدى بازىرى	shidi baziri	652325105	
Biliuhe Town	碧流河镇	Bìliúhé Zhèn	بىلۇخې بازىرى	biluxë baziri	652325106	
Sangezhuangzi Town	三个庄子镇	Sāngèzhuāngzǐ Zhèn	سەنگىجاڭزا بازىرى	sengijangza baziri	652325107	
Xibeiwan Town	西北湾镇	Xīběiwān Zhèn	شىبېيۋەن بازىرى	shibëywen baziri	652325108	
Townships
Kariz Township	坎尔孜乡	Kǎn'ěrzī Xiāng	كارىز يېزىسى	kariz yëzisi	652325202	
Gucheng Township	古城乡	Gǔchéng Xiāng	گۇچۇڭ يېزىسى	guchung yëzisi	652325204	
Qihu Township	七户乡	Qīhù Xiāng	چىخۇ يېزىسى	chixu yëzisi	652325204	
Ethnic townships
Wumachang Kazakh Ethnic Township	五马场乡 (五马场哈萨克族乡)	Wǔmǎchǎng Xiāng (Wǔmǎchǎng Hāsàkèzú Xiāng)	ۋۇماچاڭ قازاق يېزىسى	wumachang qazaq yëzisi	652325203	(Kazakh) ۋماچاڭ قازاق اۋىلى
Qorin Kazakh Ethnic Township	乔仁乡 (乔仁哈萨克族乡)	Qiáorén Xiāng (Qiáorén Hāsàkèzú Xiāng)	چورىن قازاق يېزىسى	chorin qazaq yëzisi	652325205	(Kazakh) ٴشورىن قازاق اۋىلى
Daquan Tatar Ethnic Township	塔塔尔乡 (大泉塔塔尔族乡)	Tǎtǎ'ěr Xiāng (Dàquán Tǎtǎ'ěrzú Xiāng)	داچۈەن تاتار يېزىسى	dachüen tatar yëzisi	652325208	(Tatar); Дацюань-Татар милли волосте

== Transportation ==
In 2009, the Ürümqi–Dzungaria Railway was constructed through the Jiangjun Gobi desert in the northern part of the county. It terminates at a coal mine in Jiangjunmiao. In 2024, the Qitai Jiangbulake Airport opened.

== The radio telescope project ==
In 2012, the officials of the Chinese Academy of Sciences and the Xinjiang government presided over the groundbreaking at the site of the Xinjiang Qitai Astronomical and Science Education Base. The facility, in Qitai County's Banjiegou Town (半截沟镇), will be the home of the proposed Qitai Radio Telescope. Once completed it will be the largest fully steerable single-dish radio telescope in the world.
