= List of equipment of the Argentine Army =

Equipment of the Argentine Army lists weapons, vehicles, aircraft, and other materiel that either are in service or have served with the Argentine Army, since the early 1900s.

Totals for each item are estimated as per sources cited. Items not yet in service but planned for future use are listed in a separate section. Status (confirmed or presumed) of each item is one of the following:

- INS = in active service
- RSV = in reserve (not in active service, stored for eventual use)
- RET = retired (no longer in service or in reserve)
- TBC = to be confirmed (current status unclear)

== Armored fighting vehicles ==
Model	Image	Origin	Quantity	Details
Main battle tank
TAM "Tanque Argentino Mediano"		Argentina; West Germany	250	Including variants. Being upgraded to TAM-2CA2 standard. Some of them being currently outfitted with improvised vehicle armour.
Light tank
SK-105 Kürassier		Austria	112	
Infantry fighting vehicle
TAM VCTP		Argentina; West Germany	139	Including variants. A modernization program is being planned for the VCTP system.

== Engineering and maintenance vehicles ==
Model	Image	Origin	Quantity	Details
Armoured recovery vehicles
Greif		Austria	n/a	

== Armored vehicles ==
Name	Image	Type	Origin	Quantity	Notes
M113		Armoured personnel carrier	United States	388	114 M113A2 (20 mm cannon), 70 M113A1-ACAV, 204 M113A2
M577		Armoured personnel carrier	United States	~20	Command post carrier variant of the M113. M577A1 version.
M548		Armoured personnel carrier	United States	28	Cargo carrier variant of the M113. M548A1 version.
Stryker		Armoured personnel carrier	United States	8	M1126 ICV. Total 235 (including M1256 infantry carrier, M1251A1 command post, M1131A1 fire support, and M1133A1 medical evacuation variants) on order.
WZ-551		Armoured personnel carrier	China	4	WZ-551B1
UR-416		Armoured personnel carrier	Germany	40	In 2016
Mowag Grenadier		Amphibious Transport Vehicle	Switzerland	~60	Armed with the Oerlikon 20 mm cannon
Alvis Tactica		Infantry mobility vehicle	United Kingdom	9	Armoured car used in United Nations Peacekeeping Force in Cyprus.
Humvee		Infantry mobility vehicle	United States	134	M988, M1025A2 and M1097A2 versions.

== Utility vehicles ==
Name	Image	Origin	Type	Quantity	Notes
Light utility vehicles
Mercedes-Benz G-Class		Austria / West Germany	Military light utility vehicle	~1,000	
Agrale Marrua		Brazil	Military light utility vehicle	40	
VLEGA Gaucho		Brazil; Argentina	Military light utility vehicle	28	Airborne light utility vehicle.
Polaris RZR		United States	Military light utility vehicle	~40	Airborne light utility vehicle. New batches oredered in 2024.
Ford Ranger		United States; Argentina	Utility pickup truck	~200	The Argentine Army received its first batch of 10 militarised Ford Ranger in 2020. The new vehicles will begin to replace the service's old Mercedes-Benz G-Class.
Volkswagen Amarok		Germany; Argentina	Utility pickup truck	~50	Used by Military Police.
Ford Super Duty		United States	Utility pickup truck	~30	
M151		United States	Military light utility vehicle	~100	
Toyota Hilux		Japan; Argentina	Ambulance vehicle	~20	between 19 and 23 ambulances ordered
Trucks
Unimog 406		West Germany	4x4 truck	~1,000	To be replaced by Mercedes-Benz Unimog 4000
Mercedes-Benz Atego		Germany; Argentina	4x4 truck	800	
Mercedes-Benz 2624		Germany; Argentina	6x4 truck	100	
Fiat 697		Italy	4x4 truck	~500	to be replaced by newer trucks from Iveco, VW, Mercedes, Ford
Iveco		Italy	4x4 truck	~200	Models in use: Iveco Stralis; Iveco Eurocargo; Iveco Trakker.
Pinzgauer		Austria	6x6 truck	~20	
Shaanxi SX2190		China	6x6 truck	~40	
Oshkosh FMTV		United States	6x6 truck	+40	30 FMTV Cargo 6X6 delivered in 2019.
M35 series 2½-ton 6×6 cargo truck		United States	6x6 truck	~200	
M54 5-ton 6x6 truck		United States	6x6 truck	~100	
M939 series 5-ton 6x6 truck		United States	6x6 truck	~70	30 M931A2 delivered in 2014
M916A3 Freightliner		United States	6x6 truck	~80	
Volkswagen Constellation		Germany; Brazil	6x6 truck	~100	replacement for the Fiat 697N

== Artillery ==
Name	Image	Origin	Type	Quantity	Status	Notes
Self-propelled artillery
TAM VCA		ArgentinaItaly	Self-propelled artillery	20	In service	155 mm self-propelled artillery gun.
TAM VCTM		Argentina	Mortar carrier	13	In service	120 mm mortar carrier variant of TAM
M106 mortar carrier		United States	Mortar carrier	25	In service	120 mm mortar carrier variant of M113
Rocket artillery
Pampero MRL		Argentina	Rocket artillery	5	In service	105mm multiple rocket launcher mounted on Unimog U-416. Fires incendiary rockets. Will be replaced by CP-30.
CITEDEF CP-30		Argentina	Rocket artillery	20	In service	127mm multiple rocket launcher.
TAM VCLC		Argentina	Rocket artillery	2	To be confirmed	160mm multiple rocket launcher mounted on TAM.
Field artillery
OTO Melara Mod 56		Italy	105 mm howitzer	64	In service	
CITER 155mm L33 gun		Argentina	155 mm howitzer	108	In service	
FM-120		Argentina	Mortar	330	In service	120 mm mortar.
FM-81		Argentina	Mortar	1100	In service	81 mm mortar.
FM-60		Argentina	Mortar	214	In service	60 mm mortar.

== Air defense systems ==
Name	Image	Origin	Type	Quantity	Status	Notes
Oerlikon 20 mm cannon		Switzerland	Autocannon	230	In service	20mm autocannon, GAI-D01 version in service.
Oerlikon GDF		Switzerland	Autocannon	38	In service	35mm autocannon, GDF-002 version in service.
Bofors 40 mm gun		Sweden	Autocannon	24	In service	40mm autocannon, B-40/L70 version in service.
RBS 70 NG		Sweden	MANPADS	Classified	In service	MANPADS

== Anti-tank weapons ==
Name	Image	Origin	Type	Caliber	Notes
Anti-tank systems
AT4		Sweden	Disposable Anti-Tank Weapon	84mm	Standard Rocket Propelled Grenade.
Carl Gustav M4		Sweden	Man-portable multi-role weapon system	84mm	Used mainly by special forces units and sometimes by regular units.
M72 LAW		United States	Disposable Anti-Tank Weapon	66mm	Taken out of service and replaced by AT4. In reserve.
BGM-71 TOW		United States	Anti-tank guided missile	152 mm	Mounted on Humvee vehicles.
FM Czekalski		Argentina	Recoilless rifle	105 mm	In reserve.
Loitering munition
HERO-30		Israel	Loitering Munition		Anti-tank use. Purchased in 2022.
HERO-120		Israel	Loitering Munition		Anti-tank and anti-bunker use. Purchased in 2022.

== Small arms ==
Name	Image	Origin	Caliber	Type	Notes
Pistols
Browning Hi-Power "FM Hi-Power"		Belgium; Argentina	9×19mm Parabellum	Semi-automatic pistol	Standard service pistol, used by all units of the armed forces. Manufactured by Fabricaciones Militares with polymer handguards.
Bersa Thunder 9		Argentina	9×19mm Parabellum	Semi-automatic pistol	Limited service pistol.
Glock 19		Austria	9×19mm Parabellum	Semi-automatic pistol	Standard pistol for special forces units in Glock 19X variant. Commonly equipped with silencers.
Glock 17		Austria	9×19mm Parabellum	Semi-automatic pistol	Used by special forces. Replaced by Glock 19X but still being heavily employed.
Submachine guns
FMK-3		Argentina	9×19mm Parabellum	Submachine gun	Standard submachine gun. Variants: FMK-3; FMK-4; In service from 1974 and ondwards. More than 85.000 units produced by Fabricaciones Militares as of 2024.
Brügger & Thomet APC		Switzerland	9×19mm Parabellum	Submachine gun	Standard SMG for special forces. Variants: APC9 PRO G SMG; APC9-K PRO G; APC9-SD PRO G; Used with B&T QD SMG/PDS suppressors and MICRO-T2 sights.
Colt 9mm SMG		United States	9×19mm Parabellum	Submachine gun	Used by special forces units. Replaced by B&G APC but still frequently used.
Shotguns
Bataan 71		United States; Argentina	12 gauge	Shotgun	Standard pump-action shotgun. Indigenous clone of Ithaca 37 in use. Manufactured in the 1970s by Marcati S.A.
Mossberg 500		United States	12 gauge	Shotgun	Used by special forces units.
Benelli M3		Italy	12 gauge	Shotgun	Used by special forces units and regular army units.
Rifles
FN FAL "FM FAL"		Belgium; Argentina	7.62×51mm NATO	Battle rifle	Standard issue rifle. Manufactured by Fabricaciones Militares. Variants: FAL; FAL PARA; FAL Sniper; FAMCA; All FALs being upgraded with the following accessories: Mepro-21 optical sights.; CTR MAGPUL stocks.; DSArms picatinny handguards, ambidextrous select switch and various internal parts.; All kits supplied by DSArms. A replacement is being sought in the same caliber.
IWI ARAD "IWI ARAD 7"		Israel	7.62×51mm NATO	Battle rifle	Replacing the FM FAL and M-16 progressively. First delivery of 250 rifles (200 ARAD-5 for Argentine Air Force and Naval Infantry in 5.56 NATO and 50 ARAD-7 for the Army in 7.62 NATO) from 1,600-rifle contract (1,600 ARAD-5 and ARAD-7 combined) in September 2026. Rifles have MEPRO M-5 red dot electro-optical sights.
DDM4A1 "DDM4A1EA"		United States	5.56×45mm NATO	Assault rifle	Standard rifle of special forces units. DDM4A1EA by Daniel Defense. Accessories: Trijicon ACOG 3.5×35 LED sight.; Steiner PEQ-15A laser module.; DD-Wave suppressor.; Blue Force Gear slings.; M-LOK Daniel Defense polymer grip.; MAGPUL MBUS-Pro sights.; Microsights for ACOG scope.; Sometimes customized with various after-market parts by operators individually.
M4 carbine		United States	5.56×45mm NATO	Assault rifle, Carbine	Used by special forces. Replaced by DDM4A1 but still being commonly used. Most of them employ Trijicon ACOG 4x32 sights and are seen outfitted with M203 grenade launchers.
Steyr AUG		Austria	5.56×45mm NATO	Assault rifle	Used by paratroopers, mountain troops, tank crews and special forces units. Replaced by DDM4A1 but sometimes used due to personal preference.
FARA 83 "FAA 83"		Argentina	5.56×45mm NATO	Assault rifle	Limited service rifle. Over 1,200 rifles produced by FMAP-DM from 1984 to 1990 (some further production later on in the 1990s). Mostly in reserve apart from a few elite units such as the Regiment of Mounted Grenadiers.
M16 rifle		United States	5.56×45mm NATO	Assault rifle	Limited service rifle. Rarely used by special forces units. Completely replaced by DDM4A1.
Machine guns
M249		United States	5.56×45mm NATO	Light machine gun	Standard LMG for special forces units. OOW M249P and OOW M249 from Ohio Ordnance Works. Accessories: Trijicon ACOG 3.5×35 LED sight.; Steiner PEQ-15A laser module.; Suppressor and flash hider.; MAGPUL CTR stock.; MAGPUL Moe grip.; PMAG-D60
FN FAP "Fusil Automatico Pesado"		Belgium; Argentina	7.62×51mm NATO	Squad automatic weapon	FAL rifle in heavy barrel version. Used as a squad automatic weapon. Manufactured by Fabricaciones Militares.
FN MAG "FM MAG"		Belgium; Argentina	7.62×51mm NATO	General-purpose machine gun	Standard general-purpose machine gun. Manufactured by FM. MAG 60.20 used (designated as Spanish: Ametralladora MAG Tipo 60-20 7,62). It is used by infantry and mounted on tripods, vehicles and helicopters.
M240		United States	7.62×51mm NATO	General-purpose machine gun	Used by special forces units.
MG 74		Austria	7.62×51mm NATO	General-purpose machine gun	Machine gun mounted on tanks SK-105.
AA-52		France	7.62×51mm NATO	General-purpose machine gun	General-purpose machine gun mounted on armoured vehicles.
M2 Browning		United States	.50 BMG	Heavy machine gun	Heavy support machine gun mounted on vehicles. The M2HB version is being replaced by the M2QCB.
Sniper rifles
Daniel Defense DD5V3		United States	7.62×51mm NATO	Designated Marksman Rifle	Standard special forces DMR rifle. Accessories: Leupold Mark 5HD 3.6-18×44 TMR; DD-Wave suppressors.; MAGPUL CTR stock.; MBUS pro sights.; Blue Force Gear slings.
FAMTD "Fal Sniper"		Argentina	7.62×51mm NATO	Designated Marksman Rifle	Modernization of the FAL to a designated marksman rifle (DMR). Heavy and Light barrel versions. Accessories: Harris Engineering bipod.; Picatinny rail handguard.; TRIJICON V-COG 1-8x28 Telescopic sight.; Compensator; MAGPUL PRS2 adjustable stock.; 5-round steel magazine.; Many of the accessories mentioned above are supplied by DSA arms.
Steyr SSG 69		Austria	7.62×51mm NATO	Sniper rifle	Standard service sniper rifle for regular army units.
M24 SWS		United States	7.62×51mm NATO	Sniper rifle	Used by special forces units.
CZ 750 S1 M1		Czech Republic	7.62×51mm NATO	Sniper rifle	Used by special forces units.
CG-F1T		Argentina	7.62×51mm NATO	Sniper rifle	Extremely rare but in use within certain special forces units.
Steyr HS .50		Austria	.50 BMG	Anti-materiel rifle	Standard long range & anti-materiel sniper rifle.
Grenade launchers
M203		United States	40 mm	Grenade launcher	Grenade launcher coupled on the DDM4A1, M4 and M16A2 rifles.
Mk 19		United States	40 mm	Automatic grenade launcher	Heavy support grenade launcher mounted on vehicles.

== Infantry equipment ==
Uniforms
Name	Image	Origin	Type	Notes
Uniforme de Combate Argentino (UCA) "Multicam"		Argentina	Uniform System	Battledress, standard uniform system based on Multicam. Parka, gloves, boots and jackets issued. Used since 2010s and onwards.
Woodland "Selva"		United States	Camouflage	Former standard uniform pattern. Replaced by the UCA but in use within certain army groups.
Uniforme Patagonico "Patagonico"		Argentina	Camouflage	Used by regular army units in the Cordillerana region, based on the arid british DPM. Has been replaced by UCA but it is still being occasionally used.
Multicam Alpine		United States	Camouflage	Standard uniform pattern for alpine troops, combined with white overalls.
Tricolor		United States	Camouflage	In use within special forces units. Rare
MARPAT		United States	Camouflage	In use within special forces units.
UCP		United States		In use within special forces units. Very rare
Kryptek Mandrake		United States		In use within mountain troops.
Helmets
MICH		United States	Combat Helmet	Standard issue ballistic helmet. Replacing M1 and PASGT helmets. Manufactured by GENTEX corporation.
ITP ITP "Casco EA"		Argentina	Combat Helmet	Standard issue ballistic helmet used alongside MICH. Mid cut type helmet equipped with rails and night vision mounts. Being manufactured by ITP S.A. High cut version employed by special forces.
FAST		United States	Combat Helmet	Used by special forces units. Bump type helmets are frequently employed.
PASGT		United States	Combat Helmet	Being replaced by MICH.
M1 helmet		United StatesArgentina	Combat Helmet	Used in training. Used with Multicam covers and locally manufactured.
Vests and webbing equipment
MOLLE		United StatesArgentina		Multiple models used in Multicam pattern.
Plate Carrier		United StatesArgentina		Multiple models used in Multicam pattern. Carriers by 5.11 Tactical and Eagle Industries commonly used by special forces.
IOTV		United States		Seen in vehicle crews and infantry units.
Tactical and communication equipment
AN/PVS-7		United States	Night Vision Goggles	Standard night vision goggle.
M949		United States	Night Vision Goggles	In use within helicopter crews.
AN/PVS-5		United States	Night Vision Goggles	Replaced by AN/PVS-7.
Niro		Argentina	Optic Sight	Gen 2 night vision optic for FAL rifle.
Mepro M21		Israel	Optic Sight	Standard optic sight. Employed in the FAMCA rifle.
EOTech		United States	Optic Sight	Multiple models from the company used.
Harris Falcon III		United States		Communications radio systems.
Grenades and mines
GME FMK-2 Mod. 0		Argentina		Standard hand grenade.
M67 grenade		United States		Fragmentation hand grenade.
FMK-1 mine		Argentina		Plastic anti-personnel mine, 8 centimeters in diameter and 150 grams of explosive charge.
FMK-3 mine		Argentina		Plastic anti-tank mine, 24 centimeters in diameter and 6.5 kilograms of explosive charge
FMK-5 mine		Argentina		Metal anti-tank mine, 254 millimeters in diameter.
FMK-1 Mod.0		Argentina		Shaped charge, 2350 grams of TNT and 467 millimeters long.
FMK-3 Mod.0		Argentina		Shaped charge, 5510 grams of TNT and 414 millimeters long.
SB-81 mine		Italy		Plastic anti-tank mine, 24 centimeters in diameter and 2 kilograms of explosive charge.

- Regarding anti-personnel mines, note that many models have stopped being used due to Argentina signing Mine Ban Treaty. The destiny of the stockpiles is unknown but a large part of it has been welded with pressure caps to avoid them being classified as anti-personnel.

== Radars ==
Model	Quantity	Origin	Description
Oerlikon Skyguard	5	Switzerland	Fire-control radar
AN/TPS-44 Alert MK II	3	United States	Airborne 2D radar. In service with the Joint Task Force Fortín to control the northern Argentina airspace.
INVAP RPA-200M	2	Argentina	Airborne 3D radar.
Thales Ground Observer 80	Unknown	France	Secondary surveillance radar.
AN/PPS-15	Unknown	United States	Transportable ground control radar.
RATRAS	18	United States	Ground control radar.
RASIT	44	France; Argentina	Light portable radar, capable for ground and aerial control. Modernized by INVAP.
Aselsan ACAR-K	19	Turkey	Light portable radar.

== Vessels ==
Model	Type	Origin	Quantity	Notes	Photo
BTP	Hopper barge	Argentina	3	–	–
BDT	Hopper barge	Argentina	–	–	–
LCVP	Landing craft	United States	–	–	
Zodiac Futura Commando 470	Boat	United States	130	–	–
Moon 550T	Boat	–	–	–	–
AGT T2	Boat	–	–	–	–
IGT	Recognition boat	–	–	–	–
Lantana	Launch	–	–	–	–
LANRE	Towing and tug launch	–	–	–	–

== Engineers ==
Model	Quantity	Origin	Description
M4T6	–	United States	Tactical floating bridge.
Bailey bridge	–	United Kingdom	Portable bridge.
Krupp	–	Germany	Bridge.
Urdan	–	United States	Anti-mines machine.
Sany STC800	–	China	Truck crane
Mine detector	–	United States	
Failing 1500	–	–	Drill with a capacity of 250 meters.
TC-120	–	–	Drill with a capacity of 120 meters.
M21/22	–	–	Detection and decontamination of chemical substances equipment.

== Aircraft ==
The Argentine Army Aviation service operated since its creation in 1956 both fixed and rotary wing aircraft; these are detailed in a separate list for ease of maintenance.

Fixed wing
Model	Type	Origin	Quantity	Notes	Photo
CASA/Airbus Military C-212-200 Aviocar	STOL military transport aircraft	Spain / Europe	3	The first C-212 incorporated in June 1994, exchanging an A-109A for the government of the province of Santa Fe. In 2015, two units were acquired from Aviacom, for 10 million dollars.	
Diamond DA42M Twin Star	Surveillance aircraft	Austria	3	Acquired exchanging them for eight OV-1s to Mohawk Technologies.	
de Havilland Canada DHC-6-200/300 Twin Otter	STOL utility aircraft	Canada	2	Three DHC-6-200 purchased in 1968 and one DHC-6-300 in 1978. Currently in service a DHC-6-200 and a DHC-6-300.	
Fairchild Swearingen SA226	Utility aircraft	United States	6	One SA226-T Metro IIIB and seven SA226-AT Merlin IVA.	
North American Sabreliner 75A (Sabreliner 80)	Business jet	United States	1	Acquired in 1974.	
Cessna 550B Citation II	Business jet	United States	1	Acquired in 2015 to replace the Merlin IV.	
Cessna T207 Turbo Skywagon	Light aircraft	United States	6	Nine acquired in 1976, three were destroyed, the remaining six are serving while being replaced by new Cessna Caravan.	
Cessna 208B Grand Caravan/Grand Caravan EX	Light aircraft	United States	4	Two Grand Caravan and two Grand Caravan EX acquired between 2016 and 2017.	
Cessna T-41D Mescalero	Trainer aircraft	United States	5	Five T-41D acquired from the United States Air Force in 1974.	
Helicopters
Bell UH-1H Iroquois	Military helicopter	United States	44	(Note: First twenty-five units acquired in 1969. Six 205A civilians acquired in 1978. In 1994, 6 UH-1H were acquired from the United States Army, and 10 UH-1D were converted into UH-1H from the United States Army. In 2001, ten more UH-1H were acquired, some as a source of spare parts. Between 2009 and 2010 all the Huey of the Navy and the Air Force are discharged and are grouped to the army.)	
Bell 212	Utility helicopter	United States	1	Two acquired in 1976, one lost in Antarctica in 1977, the remainder is in VIP configuration.	
Eurocopter AS332B Super Puma	Utility helicopter	France	1	They were acquired in 1986 to supply the Antarctic bases. At the end of the 90s they were immobilized. In 2012 one was returned to service by Heli-Union in France.	
Aérospatiale SA 315B Lama	Utility helicopter	France	5	Six acquired in 1975 for search and rescue tasks in the Cordillera de los Andes. They would be transferred to the Air Force.	
Bell 206	Trainer helicopter	United States / Canada	20	(Note: Five Bell 206B-3 restored by Bell were acquired in 2011 through the FMS. After delays due to economic and bureaucratic problems, the contract was signed in 2016, where it was agreed to exchange twenty AB 206 for three G 222. The helicopters were restored by Heli World and the first five arrived at the port of Zárate in January 2018. The rest of the shipment is scheduled for the rest of the year. It was announced that five of the twenty will go to the Gendarmerie in exchange for two Huey.)	
Sikorsky UH-60L Black Hawk	Military	United States		4 on order, with option for 16 more. Will replace Bell UH-1H.	
Unmanned aerial vehicles
Lipán M3	Unmanned aerial vehicle	Argentina	6		
Mavic	Miniature UAV	China	36		
Tehuelche 320	Miniature UAV	Argentina	1	For anti-aircraft warfare simulation	

== See also ==
- Currently active military equipment by country
