= FMK-3 =

FMK-3 may refer to:

- FMK-3 mine
- FMK-3 submachine gun
