= Alvis Tactica =

RG-12
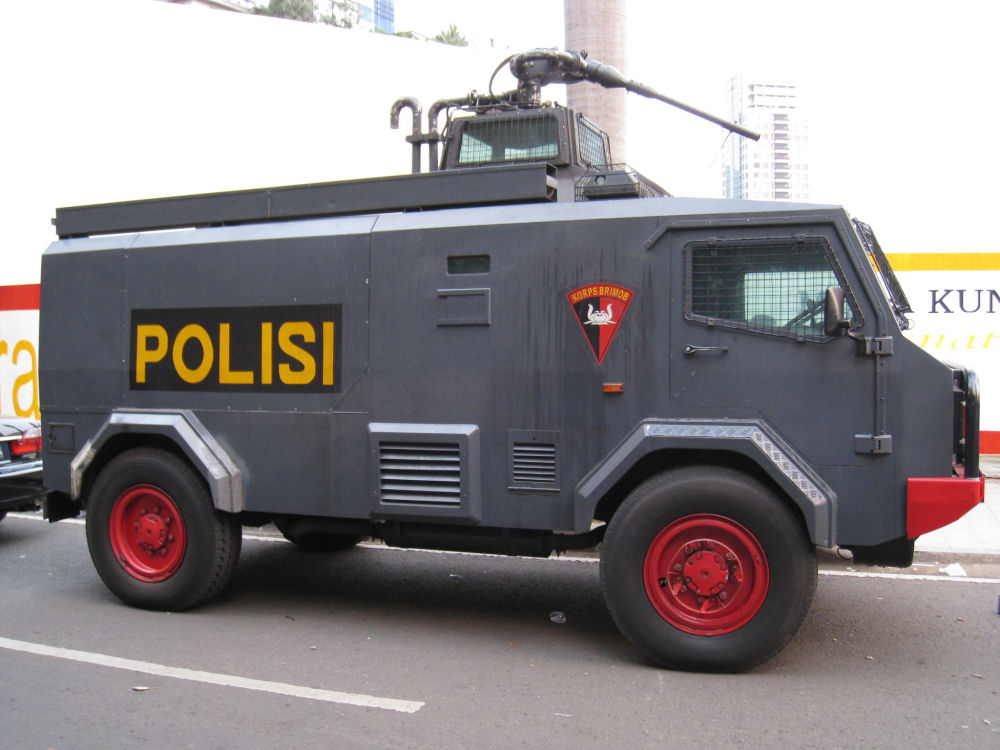
- Tactica of the Indonesian BRIMOB
- Type: Armoured vehicle
- Place of origin: United Kingdom

Specifications
- Mass: 13,500 kg (Gross) 10,000 kg (empty)
- Length: 4 m
- Crew: 14 max
- Engine: Mercedes-Benz 906 series or Mercedes-Benz OM 906LA turbo-charged diesel engine
- Power/weight: 176 hp / 129kW
- Suspension: 4 × 4 wheeled
- Operational range: 650 km
- Maximum speed: 120 km/h

The Alvis Tactica is a 4x4 or 6x6 wheeled military vehicle produced by GKN Defense, Alvis plc and later by BAE Systems Land Systems. The vehicle was designed by Glover Webb and introduced in 1988. It comes in a number of variants including APC and Internal Security and Riot Control. The platform is no longer produced by BAE Systems.

== Users ==
Never an armed military vehicle, the Tactica is also suited for civilian use, namely by police forces. Ideally suited as an armoured personnel carrier the first Tacticas were based on Stonefield chassis and latterly by Mol chassis designed in-house at Glover Webb Limited of Hamble, Hampshire, UK. Variants included ambulances, APCs, water cannons, crowd control, perimeter control, and IEDD.

Variants are in service with the following nations:

- (Argentina) Argentine Army: 10 deployed at United Nations Peacekeeping Force in Cyprus
- Ghana Army
- Indonesia (12 deployed by police force)
- Mauritius (14 deployed by military)
- Norway – (Norwegian Army, 3 in service as ambulances)
- Saudi Arabia – (Saudi Arabian National Guard and Ministry of Interior)
- (United Kingdom) – British Army beginning in 1993 in Northern Ireland; now all retired
- Ukraine 1+

== See also ==
- Anoa (armoured personnel carrier)
- BOV M11
- BRDM-2
- Fahd (armored personnel carrier)
- M1117 armored security vehicle
- Ratel IFV
- RG-12
- Steyr-Puch Pinzgauer
- TPz Fuchs
- Véhicule de l'Avant Blindé
- WZ-551
