= FMK-1 mine =

Anti-personnel mine

The FMK-1 is a small circular Argentina anti-personnel blast mine which, when fitted with a stiffened pressure plate, is also used as the fuze for the FMK-3 and FMK-5 anti-tank mines. The mine has a circular plastic body, with a number of small ribs running vertically around the outside of the mine, with the circular detonator and striker protruding on each side. The pressure plate has a distinctive six pointed star shape ribbing for stiffness. The bottom of the mine has small base plug inside which a small stud is installed. The stud increases the activation pressure of the mine. A metal detector disc can be added to the bottom of the mine, but it is not often used. It is actually in service with the Argentine Army.

The mine may have been based on the Russian PMN mine, and it is similar to the Chinese Type 58 mine and Hungarian GYATA 64 mine.

The mine is found in the Falkland Islands where it was used during the Falklands War. Since Argentina has signed the Mine Ban Treaty, the only stocks of the mine that have been retained have the thick pressure cap welded on.

== Specifications ==
- Diameter: 82 mm
- Height: 40 mm
- Weight: 253 g
- Explosive content: 152 g of a TNT/RDX mix
- Operating pressure:
  - 5 kg (without stud fitted)
  - 15 to 50 kg (with stud fitted)
  - 300 kg (with stud and stiff pressure plate)

== See also ==
- FMK-3 mine – (Argentina)
- FMK-5 mine – (Argentina)
