= FMK-5 mine =

Anti-tank mine

The FMK-5 is a circular Argentinian minimum metal anti-tank blast mine. Like the FMK-3 mine it uses a FMK-1 anti-personnel mine as a trigger. The FMK-1 is fitted with a stiff cap to increase its activation pressure to 300 kg. Without the cap, the mine would be triggered by a load of less than 50 kg.

== Specifications ==
- Diameter: 254 mm
- Height: 88 mm
- Weight: 6.13 kg
- Explosive content: 5 kg of TNT
- Operating pressure: 300 kg
