= Argentine Army =

- Ejército Argentino
- Seal
- Founded: May 29, 1810; 216 years ago
- Country: Argentine Republic
- Branch: Army
- Size: 108,000 active soldiers (2023); 350 medium & light tanks; 800 armored fighting vehicles; 60 self propelled artillery; 400 towed artillery; 30 rocket artillery
- Part of: Argentine Armed Forces
- Motto: "Born with the Fatherland in May 1810"
- Colors: Garnet and gold
- March: Song of the Argentine Army
- Anniversaries: Army Day (29 May)
- Equipment: Equipment of the Argentine Army
- Engagements: List: Argentine War of Independence; Spanish American wars of independence; Portuguese invasion of the Banda Oriental; Argentine Civil Wars; Portuguese conquest of the Banda Oriental; War of Independence of Maynas; Cisplatine War; Desert Campaign (1833–1834); Tarija War; Uruguayan Civil War; French blockade of the Río de la Plata; Anglo-French blockade of the Río de la Plata; Platine War; Paraguayan War; Conquest of the Desert; Operation Independence; Operation Primicia; 1975 Monte Chingolo attack; Falklands War; 1989 attack on La Tablada barracks
- Website: argentina.gob.ar/ejercito

Commanders
- Commander-in-chief: President Javier Milei
- Chief of General Staff: Lieutenant General Oscar Zarich
- Deputy Chief of General Staff: Division General Walter Re

Insignia
- Identification symbol

The Argentine Army (Spanish: Ejército Argentino, EA) is the land force branch of the Armed Forces of the Argentine Republic and the senior military service of Argentina. Under the Argentine Constitution, the president of Argentina is the commander-in-chief of the Armed Forces. Command authority is exercised through the Minister of Defense.

The Army's official foundation date is May 29, 1810 (celebrated in Argentina as the Army Day), four days after the Spanish colonial administration in Buenos Aires was overthrown. The new national army was formed out of several pre-existing colonial militia units and locally manned regiments; most notably the Infantry Regiment "Patricios", which to this date is still an active unit.

== History ==
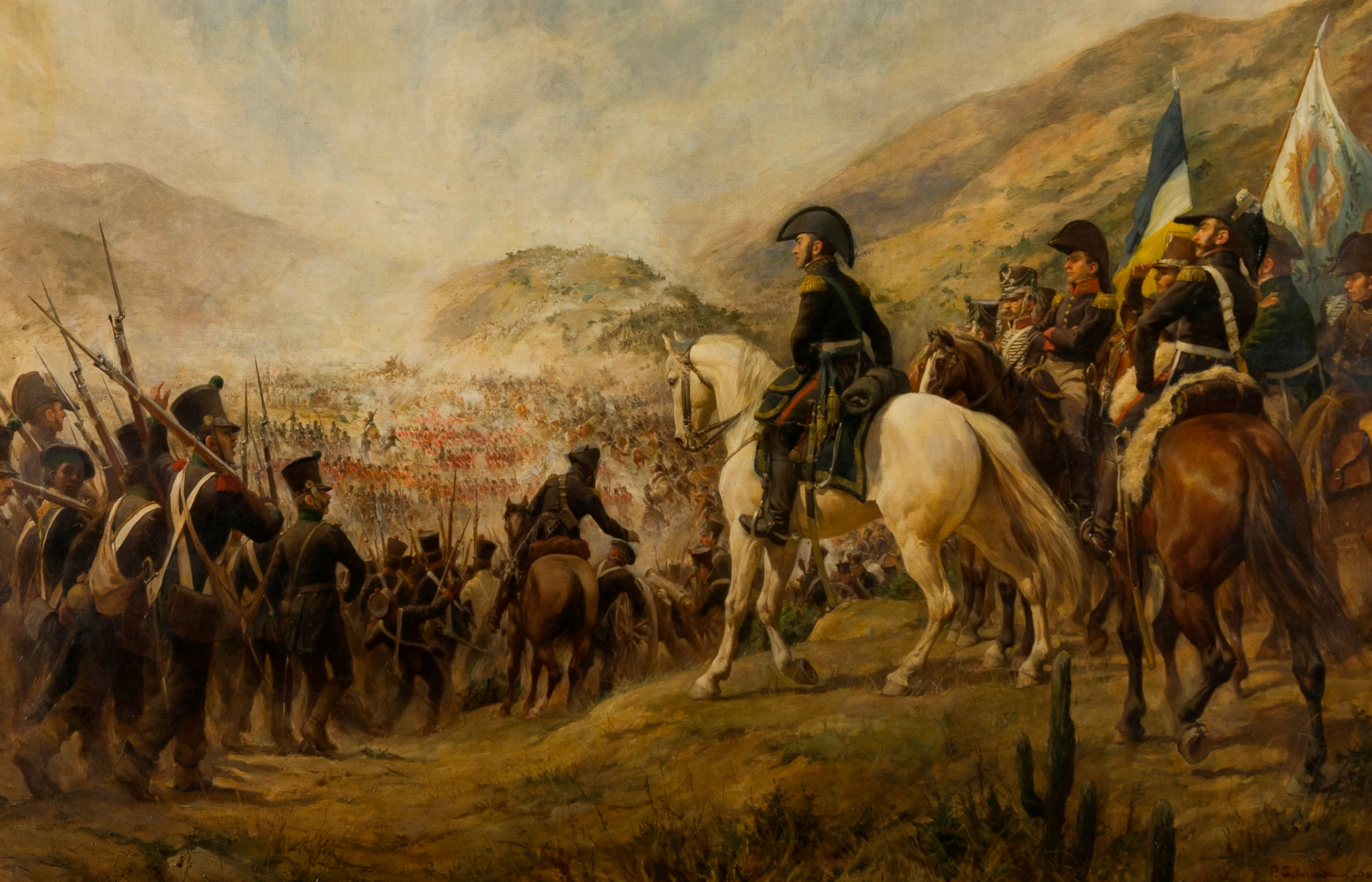
Gral. José de San Martín during Battle of Chacabuco, 1817

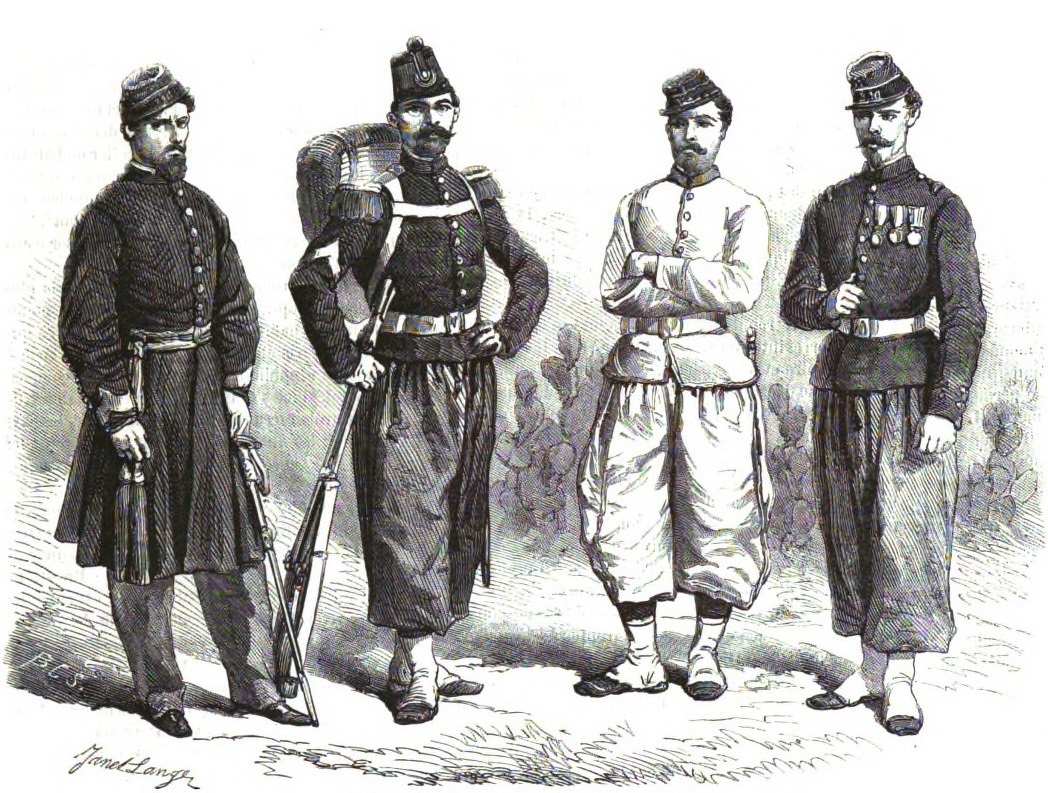
Argentine infantry soldiers in the Paraguayan War illustrated by Ange-Louis Janet for L'Illustration, 1864

Several armed expeditions were sent to the Upper Peru (now Bolivia), Paraguay, Uruguay and Chile to fight Spanish forces and secure Argentina's newly gained independence. The most famous of these expeditions was the one led by General José de San Martín, who led a 5000-man army across the Andes Mountains to expel the Spaniards from Chile and later from Perú. While the other expeditions failed in their goal of bringing all the dependencies of the former Viceroyalty of the Río de la Plata under the new government in Buenos Aires, they prevented the Spaniards from crushing the rebellion.

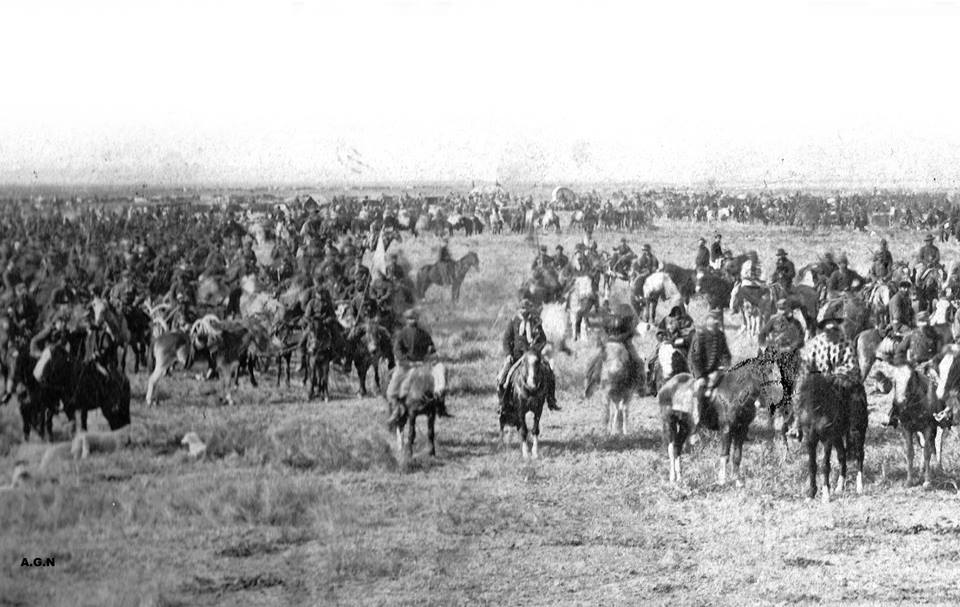
Argentine Army, led by General Julio A. Roca, commemorating an anniversary of the May Revolution in 1879

During the civil wars of the first half of the nineteenth century, the Argentine Army became fractionalized under the leadership of the so-called caudillos ("leaders" or "warlords"), provincial leaders who waged a war against the centralist Buenos Aires administration. However, the Army was briefly re-unified during the war with the Brazilian Empire (1824–1827).

It was only with the establishment of a constitution (which explicitly forbade the provinces from maintaining military forces of their own) and a national government recognized by all the provinces that the Army became a single force, absorbing the older provincial militias. The Army went on to fight the War of the Triple Alliance in the 1860s together with Brazil and Uruguay against Paraguay. After that war, the Army became involved in Argentina's Conquista del Desierto ("Conquest of the Desert"): the campaign to occupy Patagonia and root out the natives, who conducted looting raids throughout the country.

=== 1880–1960s ===
Between 1880 and 1930, the Army sought to become a professional force without active involvement in politics, even though many a political figure -President Julio Argentino Roca, for example- benefitted from a past military career. The Army prevented the fall of the government in a number of Radical-led uprisings. Meanwhile, the military in general and the Army, in particular, contributed to develop Argentina's unsettled southern frontier and its nascent industrial complex.

The main foreign influence during this period was, by and large, the Prussian (and then German) doctrine. Partly because of that, during both World Wars most of the officers supported the Germans, more or less openly, while the Argentine Navy favored the British instead.

When workers at the Vasena metal works went on strike in Buenos Aires in early January 1919 there was soon a full-scale bolshevik-led uprising in the Argentine capital. The city erupted in street battles, with two policemen (Corporal Teófilo Ramírez and Agent Ángel Giusti) killed fighting off thousands of strikers attempting to overrun 8 police stations in order to seize their weapons. General Luis Dellepiane and his 2nd Division along with reinforcements in the form of 500 Marines restored order. These events became known in Argentina, because of the violence and bloodshed, as 'Tragic Week'.

Between 1920 and 1922, there were another violent uprising this time in the form of rural workers in Santa Cruz Province led again by anarchists and bolsheviks in Southern Argentina, that was followed by a violent suppression on the part of the Argentine Army 10th Cavalry Regiment (under Colonel Héctor Benigno Varela) that resulted in the execution of some 300-1,500 workers that had earlier on killed 5 policemen and taken hostage some 1,000 ranch-owners along with their families (many of them British, Scottish, and Spanish) along with their employees.

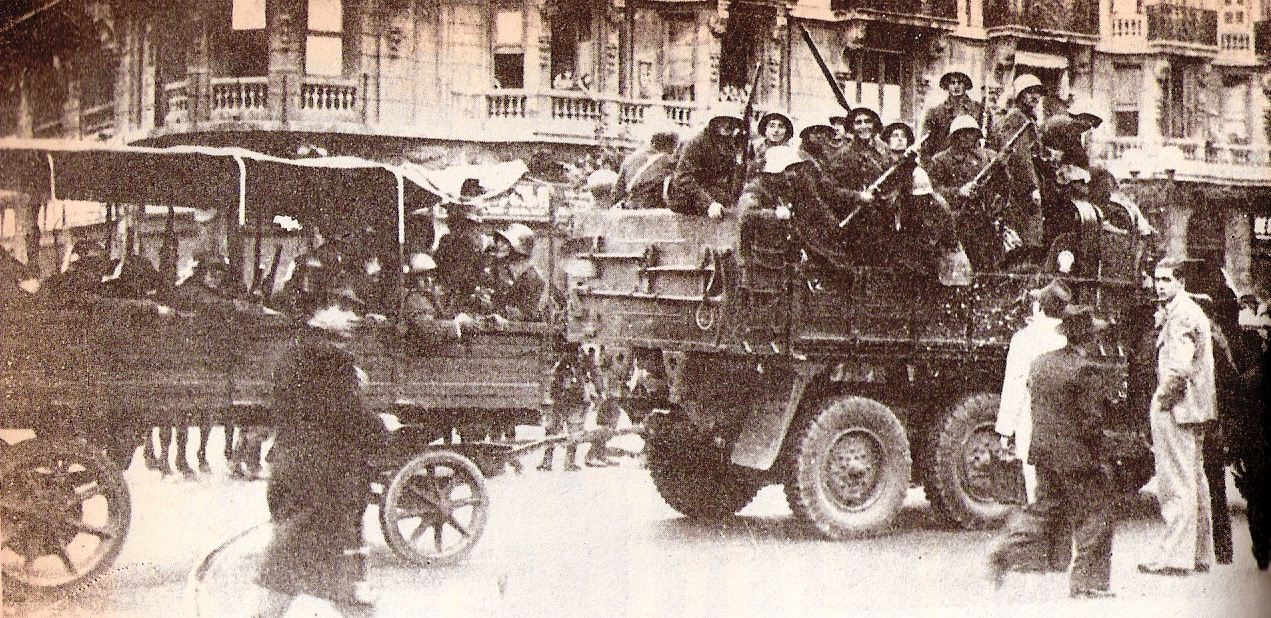
Argentine troops in 1943

In 1930, a small group of Army forces (not more than 600 troops) deposed President Hipólito Yrigoyen without much response from the rest of the Army and the Navy. This was the beginning of a long history of political intervention by the military. Another coup, in 1943, was responsible for bringing an obscure colonel into the political limelight: Juan Perón.

Even though Perón had the support of the military during his two consecutive terms of office (1946–1952 and 1952–1955), his increasingly repressive government alienated many officers, which finally led to a military uprising which overthrew him in September 1955. Between 1955 and 1973 the Army and the rest of the military became vigilant over the possible re-emergence of Peronism in the political arena, which led to two new coups against elected Presidents in 1962 (deposing Arturo Frondizi) and 1966 (ousting Arturo Illia). Political infighting eroded discipline and cohesion within the army, to the extent that there was armed fighting between contending military units during the early 1960s.

=== 1960s and the military junta ===
The military government ruled Argentina between 1966 and 1973. During that decade the saw the rise of several terrorist groups including Montoneros and the ERP. During Héctor Cámpora's first months of government, a rather moderate and left-wing Peronist, approximatively 600 social conflicts, strikes and factory occupations took place. Following the June 20, 1973 Ezeiza massacre, left and right-wing Peronism broke apart, and the Triple A a far-right terrorist group founded by José López Rega, the right-hand man of Juan Perón and, later, Isabel Perón, started a campaign of terror and death against any perceived political rivals. Isabel Perón herself was ousted during the March 1976 coup by a military junta.

The new military government, self-named Proceso de Reorganización Nacional, initially tried to end the guerrilla's campaigns, but the nation rapidly descended into a state of civil unrest. Terrorist organisations and guerrilla movements were often met with a mixture of state terror and general paranoia. The civilian population was now caught in a police state between a paranoid and brutal military dictatorship and violent dissident communist guerrillas. The PRN called this period the "Dirty War" — a term refused by jurists during the 1985 Trial of the Juntas. Batallón de Inteligencia 601 (the 601st Intelligence Battalion) became infamous during this period. It was a special military intelligence service set up in the late 1970s, active in the Dirty War and Operation Condor, and disbanded in 2000. Its personnel collected information on and infiltrated guerrilla groups and human rights organisations, and coordinated killings, kidnappings and other abuses. The unit also participated in the training of Nicaraguan Contras with US assistance, including from John Negroponte.

==== "Annihilation decrees" ====
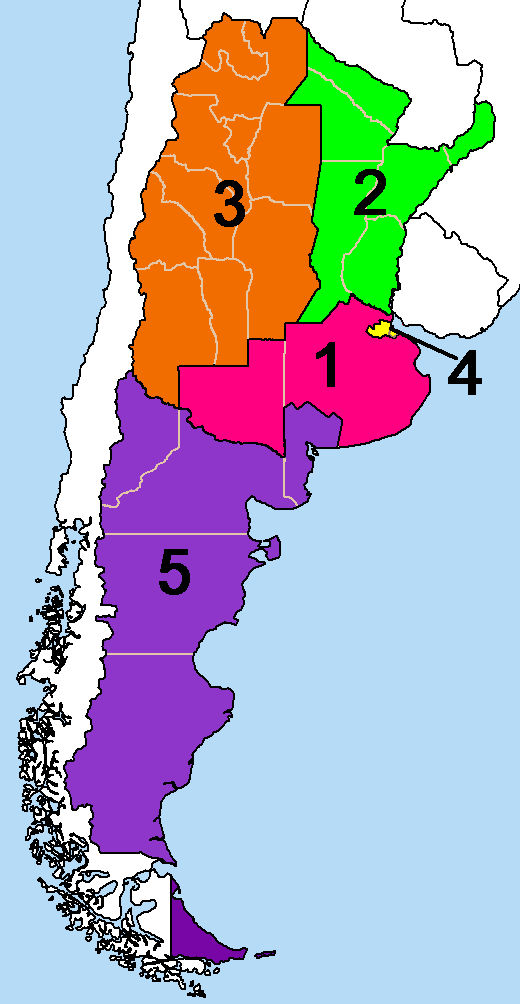
Military zones of Argentina, 1975–1983

Meanwhile, the Guevarist People's Revolutionary Army (ERP), led by Roberto Santucho and inspired by Che Guevara's foco theory, began a rural insurgency in the province of Tucumán, in the mountainous northwest of Argentina. It started the campaign with no more than 100 men and women of the Marxist ERP guerrilla force and ended with about 300 in the mountains (including reinforcements in the form of the elite Montoneros 65-strong "Compañía de Monte" (Jungle Company) and the ERP's "Decididos de Córdoba" Urban Company), which the Argentine Army managed to defeat, but at a cost.

On 5 January 1975, an Army DHC-6 transport plane was downed near the Monteros mountains, apparently shot down by the guerrillas. All thirteen on board were killed. The military believe a heavy machine gun or sabotage had brought down the aircraft.

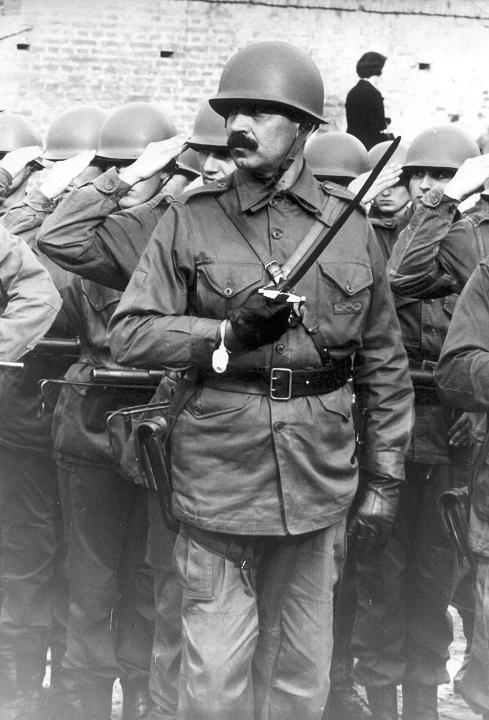
Argentine troops in 1977

In response, Ítalo Luder, President of the National Assembly who acted as interim President substituting himself to Isabel Perón who was ill for a short period, signed in February 1975 the secret presidential decree 261, which ordered the army to neutralize and/or annihilate the insurgency in Tucumán, the smallest province of Argentina. Operativo Independencia gave power to the Armed Forces to "execute all military operations necessary for the effects of neutralizing or annihilating the action of subversive elements acting in the Province of Tucumán." Santucho had declared a 620-mile (1,000 km) "liberated zone" in Tucumán and demanded Soviet-backed protection for its borders as well as proper treatment of captured guerrillas as POWs.

The Argentine Army Fifth Brigade, then consisting of the 19th, 20th and 29th Mountain Infantry Regiments and commanded by Brigadier-General Acdel Vilas received the order to move to Famaillá in the foothills of the Monteros mountains on 8 February 1975. While fighting the guerrillas in the jungle, Vilas concentrated on uprooting the ERP support network in the towns, using tactics later adopted nationwide, as well as a civic action campaign.

By July 1975, anti-guerrilla commandos were mounting search-and-destroy missions in the mountains. Army special forces discovered Santucho's base camp in August, then raided the ERP urban headquarters in September. Most of the Compañia de Monte's general staff was killed in October and was dispersed by the end of the year.

The leadership of the rural guerrilla force was mostly eradicated and many of the ERP guerrillas and civilian sympathizers in Tucumán were either killed or forcefully disappeared. Efforts to restrain the rural guerrilla activity to Tucumán, however, remained unsuccessful despite the use of 24 recently arrived US-made Bell UH-1H Huey troop-transport helicopters that helped equip the 601st Combat Aviation Battalion for counter-insurgency-operations. In early October, the 5th Brigade suffered a major blow at the hands of the Montoneros, when more than one hundred, and possibly several hundred Montoneros and supporters were involved in the Operation Primicia, the most elaborate operation of the "Dirty War", which involved hijacking a civilian airliner, taking over the provincial airport, attacking the 29th Infantry Regiment (which had retired to barracks in Formosa Province) and capturing its cache of arms, and finally escaping by air. Once the operation was over, they escaped towards a remote area in Santa Fe Province. The aircraft, a Boeing 737, eventually landed on a crop field not far from the city of Rafaela.

In the aftermath, twelve soldiers and two policemen were killed and several wounded. The sophistication of the operation, and the getaway cars and safehouses they used to escape from the crash-landing site, suggest several hundred guerrillas and their supporters were involved. The Argentine Armed Force and Police admitted to 84 army troops, policemen, Gendarmerie troops and supporting militia volunteers killed operating in Tucumán and surrounding provinces in northern Argentina between 1975 and 1977. By December 1975, the Argentine military could, with some justification claim that it was winning the 'Dirty War', but it was dismayed to find no evidence of overall victory.

On 23 December 1975, several hundred ERP fighters and their underground supporters, staged an all-out battle with the Monte Chingolo-based 601st Arsenal Battalion and army and police reinforcements some nine miles (14 km) from Buenos Aires and occupied four local police stations and the La Plata Barracks. 63 guerrillas, seven army troops and three policemen were killed. In addition 20 civilians were killed in the crossfire. Many of the civilian deaths occurred when the guerrillas and supporting militants burned 15 city buses near the arsenal to hamper reinforcements from the Buenos Aires-based Rapid Deployment Force in the form of the 10th Mechanized Infantry Brigade. This development was to have far-reaching ramifications. On 30 December 1975, urban guerrillas exploded a bomb inside the Army's headquarters in Buenos Aires, injuring at least six soldiers.

The Montoneros movement successfully utilized demolition frogmen in underwater infiltrations and blew the pier where the Argentine destroyer ARA Santísima Trinidad was being built, on 22 August 1975. The ship was effectively immobilized for several years.

The worst year of the Argentine insurgency, 1976, saw 156 members of the Argentine Armed Forces killed. During 1977, in just Buenos Aires alone, 36 police were reported killed in action against the remaining urban guerrillas operating in the Argentine capital.

==== French cooperation ====
French journalist Marie-Monique Robin has found in the archives of the Quai d'Orsay, the French Minister of Foreign Affairs, the original document proving that a 1959 agreement between Paris and Buenos Aires instaured a "permanent French military mission", formed of veterans who had fought in the Algerian War, and which was located in the offices of the chief of staff of the Argentine Army. She showed how Valéry Giscard d'Estaing's government secretly collaborated with Jorge Rafael Videla's junta in Argentina and with Augusto Pinochet's regime in Chile.

Green deputies Noël Mamère, Martine Billard and Yves Cochet deposed on September 10, 2003, a request for the constitution of a Parliamentary Commission on the "role of France in the support of military regimes in Latin America from 1973 to 1984" before the Foreign Affairs Commission of the National Assembly, presided by Edouard Balladur. Apart from Le Monde, newspapers remained silent about this request. However, deputy Roland Blum, in charge of the commission, refused to hear Marie-Monique Robin, and published in December 2003 a 12 pages report qualified by Robin as the summum of bad faith. It claimed that no agreement had been signed, despite the agreement found by Robin in the Quai d'Orsay

When Minister of Foreign Affairs Dominique de Villepin traveled to Chile in February 2004, he claimed that no cooperation between France and the military regimes had occurred.

==== Falklands war ====
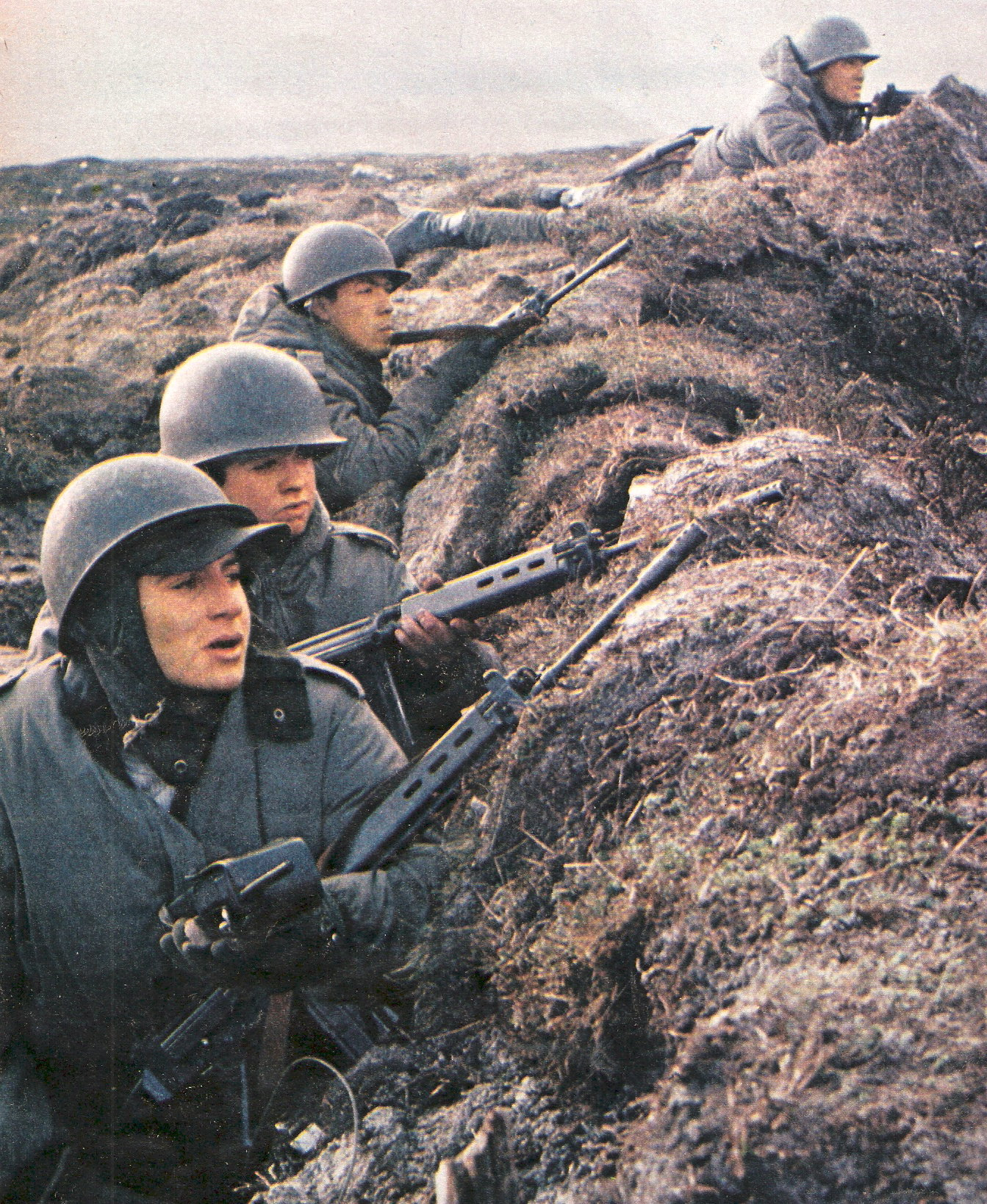
Argentine soldiers with FN FAL rifles, Falklands War

On 2 April 1982, Leopoldo Galtieri initiated the 1982 invasion of the Falkland Islands or Operation Rosario as a result of negotiations with the United Kingdom running long. The Argentine Army contributed forces to Operation Rosario and occupation that followed. Army forces also opposed the amphibious landing in San Carlos Water on 21 May, and fought the British at Goose Green, Mount Kent, and the battles around Port Stanley that lead to the ceasefire of 14 June followed by the surrender of the Argentine troops.

A total of 11 platoon-sized and company-sized counterattacks involving 600 officers, NCOs and national servicemen, had been conducted on the part of the Argentine defenders at Goose Green and Port Stanley, that at times stalled or threatened to completely derail the British advance with one helicopter-borne offensive on the part of the Argentine commandos being conducted against the British Special Air Service on Mount Kent known as Operación Autoimpuesta (Operation Self-Imposed-Initiative) with Colonel Mike Rose from the SAS later admitting, "Because we hadn't moved to Mount Kent when we should have done on 25th May, the Argentines had already flown in some special forces units to knock us off the top of Mount Kent. By the time we got there the Argentine Special Force were almost up onto the ridge from which they could have brought direct fire down onto the landing helicopters. Then, as Julian Thompson said, it would have been Game Over."

The Argentine Army suffered 194 men killed and 1,308 wounded and lost much equipment. The war left the army weakened in equipment, personal, moral and supremacy in the region. The Dirty War events, coupled with the defeat in the Falklands War, precipitated the fall of the military junta that ruled the country, then enters the General Reynaldo Bignone, who began the process of return to democracy in 1983.

=== 1980s to present ===
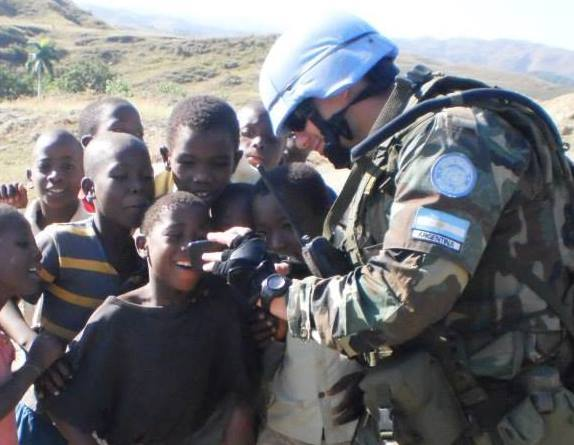
Soldier of the Argentine Joint Battalion of MINUSTAH entertains some children.

Since the return to civilian rule in 1983, the Argentine military have been reduced both in number and budget and, by law, cannot intervene anymore in internal civil conflicts. They became more professional, especially after conscription was abolished.

On 23 January, armed leftist militants stormed the La Tablada Barracks in Buenos Aires. The attack was led by the All For The Fatherland Movement (Movimiento Todos Por La Patria or MTP) comprising mainly former members of the People's Revolutionary Army (Ejército Revolucionario del Pueblo or ERP) the main rural guerrilla force operating in northern Argentina in the early to mid 1970s.

As a result, the Argentine Army was allowed to take part in urban warfare again in the 1989 attack on La Tablada barracks and the National Strategic Force in the form of the Córdoba-based 4th Airborne Infantry Brigade was airlifted to Buenos Aires in case the fighting spread out across the Argentine capital and Lieutenant-Colonel Eugenio Dalton became Director of the Argentine National Security Agency in 1989 in the wake of the attack.

In 1998, Argentina was granted Major non-NATO ally status by the United States. The modern Argentine Army is fully committed to international peacekeeping under United Nations mandates, humanitarian aid and emergencies relief.

In 2010, the Army incorporated Chinese Norinco armored wheeled APCs to deploy with its peacekeeping forces.

In 2016 President Mauricio Macri modified a decree made by the 1984 government of Raúl Alfonsín which had removed much of the military's autonomy.

A major problem of today's Army is that most of its combat units are understrength in manpower due to budgetary limitations; the current Table of Organization and Equipment being established at a time during which the Army could rely on larger budgets and conscripted troops. Current plans call for the expansion of all combat units until all combat units are again full-strength, as soon as budget constraints allow for the induction of new volunteer service personnel of both genders.

== Structure ==
=== Army General Staff ===
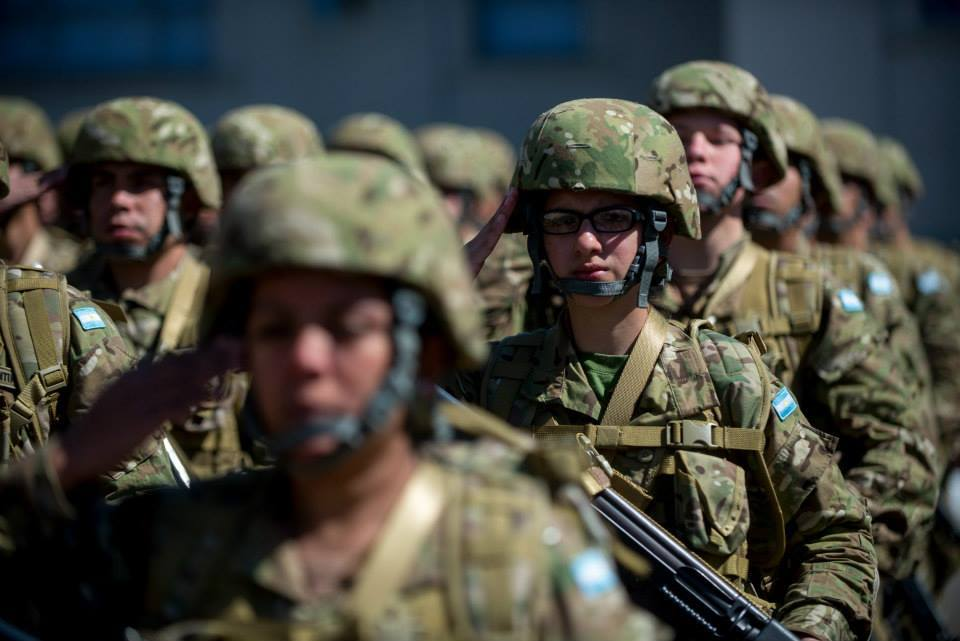
Parade of the Argentine Army, 2016.

The Army is headed by a Chief of General Staff directly appointed by the President. The current Chief of the General Staff (since September 2008) is General Luis Alberto Pozzi. The General Staff of the Army (Estado Mayor General del Ejército) includes the Chief of Staff, a Deputy Chief of the General Staff and the heads of the General Staff's six departments (Jefaturas). The current departments of the General Staff (known also by their Roman numerals) are:

There are also a number of Commands and Directorates responsible for development and implementation of policies within the Army regarding technological and operational areas. They also handle administrative affairs. As of 2020, these include the following:

- Communications and Computer Directorate (Dirección General de Comunicaciones e Informática)
- Education Directorate (Dirección General de Educación)
- Engineers and Infrastructure Directorate (Dirección de Ingenieros e Infraestructura)
- Remount and Veterinary Directorate (Dirección de Remonta y Veterinaria)
- Health Directorate (Dirección General de Salud)
- Personnel and Welfare Directorate
- Materiel Directorate (Dirección General de Material)
- Intelligence Directorate
- Organization and Doctrine Directorate
- Research and Development Directorate (Dirección General de Investigación y Desarrollo)
- Planning Directorate (Dirección de Planeamiento)
- Finance Directorate
- Historical Service Directorate

=== Field organization ===
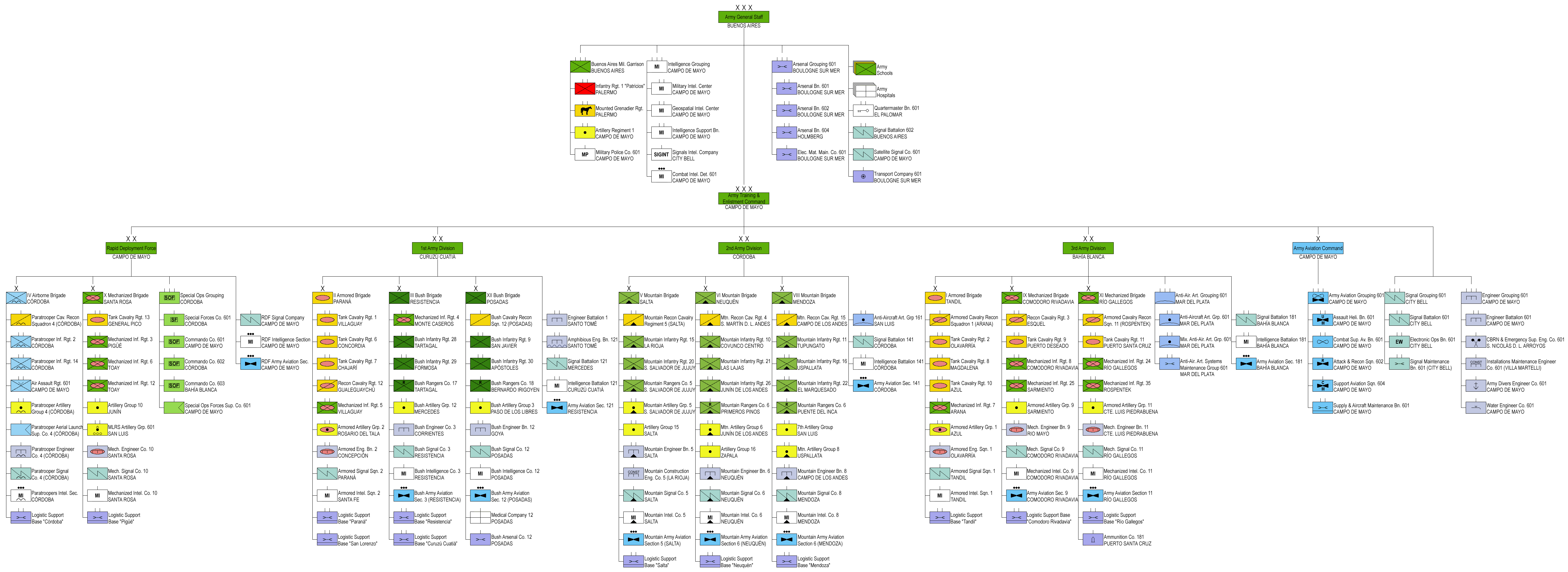
Structure of the Argentine Army 2020 (click to enlarge)

In the 1960s, the Army was reorganised into five Army Corps. This structure replaced the old structure based on divisions following the French model. There was a further reorganisation in 1991, when brigades were assigned to six new divisions, two stationed at Santa Cruz and Mendoza.

Until late 2010, the First, Second and Third Army Divisions were designated as the Second, Third and Fifth Army Corps (Cuerpos de Ejército) respectively, without any intermediate division-level commands. These redesignations took place as part of a major reorganization of the Armed Forces' administrative and command structure. Two additional Army Corps, the First and Fourth, had already been dissolved in 1984 and 1991 respectively, with their dependent units reassigned to the remaining three Army Corps.

As of 2011, army forces are geographically grouped into three Army Divisions (Divisiones de Ejército), each roughly equivalent in terms of nominal organization to a U.S. Army division (+). Each Army Division has an area of responsibility over a specific region of the country; First Army Division covers the northeast of the country, Second Army Division covers the center and northwest of Argentina and Third Army Division covers the south and Patagonia. In addition to the three Army Divisions, the Rapid Deployment Force (Fuerza de Despliegue Rápido, FDR) forms an additional fourth divisional-level formation, while the Buenos Aires Military Garrison operates independently from any division-sized command. There are also several separate groups, including an anti-aircraft group and the Argentine Army Aviation group.

Each division has varying numbers of brigades of armor, mechanized forces and infantry.

As of 2011, the Argentine Army has eleven brigades:

- two armored brigades (1st and 2nd),
- three mechanized brigades (9th, 10th and 11th),
- three mountain brigades (5th, 6th and 8th),
- one paratrooper brigade (4th) and
- two bush brigades (3rd and 12th).

Note: The 7th Infantry Brigade was dissolved in early 1985, while the 3rd Infantry Brigade was converted into a motorized training formation, which was ultimately dissolved in 2003.

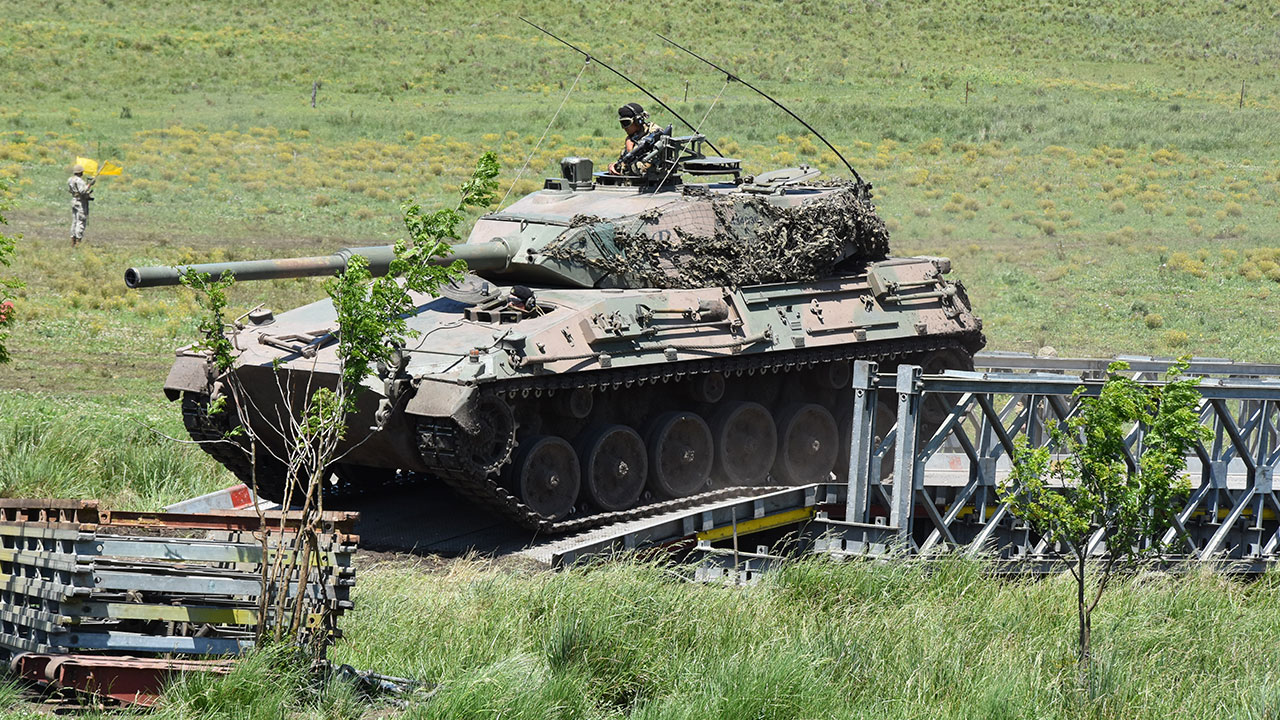
TAM tank in exercise

Depending on its type, each brigade includes two to five Cavalry or Infantry Regiments, one or two Artillery Groups, a scout cavalry squadron, one battalion or company-sized engineer unit, one intelligence company, one communications company, one command company and a battalion-sized logistical support unit. The terms "regiment" and "group", found in the official designations of cavalry, infantry and artillery units, are used due to historical reasons. During the Argentine War of Independence, the Argentine Army fielded traditional regiment-sized units. 'Regiments' are more accurately described as battalions; similar-sized units that do not belong to the above-mentioned services are referred to as "battalions". In addition to their service, Regiments and Groups are also specialized according to their area of operations (Mountain Infantry, Jungle Infantry, Mountain Cavalry), their equipment (Tank Cavalry, Light Cavalry, Mechanized Infantry) or their special training (Paratroopers, Commandos, Air Assault, Mountain Cazadores or Jungle Cazadores). Regiments are made up by four maneuver sub-units (companies in infantry regiments and squadrons in cavalry regiments) and one command and support sub-unit for a total of 350 to 700 troops.

In 2006, a Rapid Deployment Force was created based on the 4th Paratrooper Brigade.

In 2008, a Special Operations Forces Group was created comprising two Commando Companies, one Special Forces Company and one psychological operations company.

== Ranks ==
Insignia for all ranks except volunteers is worn on shoulder boards. Ranks from colonel major onwards use red-trimmed shoulderboards and the suns denoting rank are gold-braid; the suns on other officers' shoulder boards are metallic. Generals also wear golden wreath leaves on their coat lapels.

The rank insignia for volunteers 1st class, 2nd class and commissioned 2nd class is worn on the sleeves. Collar versions of the ranks are used in combat uniforms.

The highest army rank in use is lieutenant-general. A higher army rank, captain-general, was awarded twice in the nineteenth century: to José de San Martín and to Bernardino Rivadavia. As a promotion to this rank is not foreseen, no insignia for the rank currently exists.

=== Officers ===
Rank group	General / flag officers				Senior officers			Junior officers
Argentine Army
Argentine Army	Teniente general	General de división	General de brigada	Coronel mayor	Coronel	Teniente coronel	Mayor	Capitán	Teniente primero	Teniente	Subteniente

The rank of coronel mayor (senior colonel) is an honorary distinction for colonels occupying general's positions (such as brigade commander), but who are not senior enough to be promoted.

=== NCOs and enlisted ===
Rank group	Senior NCOs					Junior NCOs		Enlisted
Argentine Army
Argentine Army	Suboficial mayor	Suboficial principal	Sargento ayudante	Sargento primero	Sargento	Cabo primero	Cabo	Voluntario primero	Voluntario segundo	Soldado de segunda en comisión

== Image gallery ==
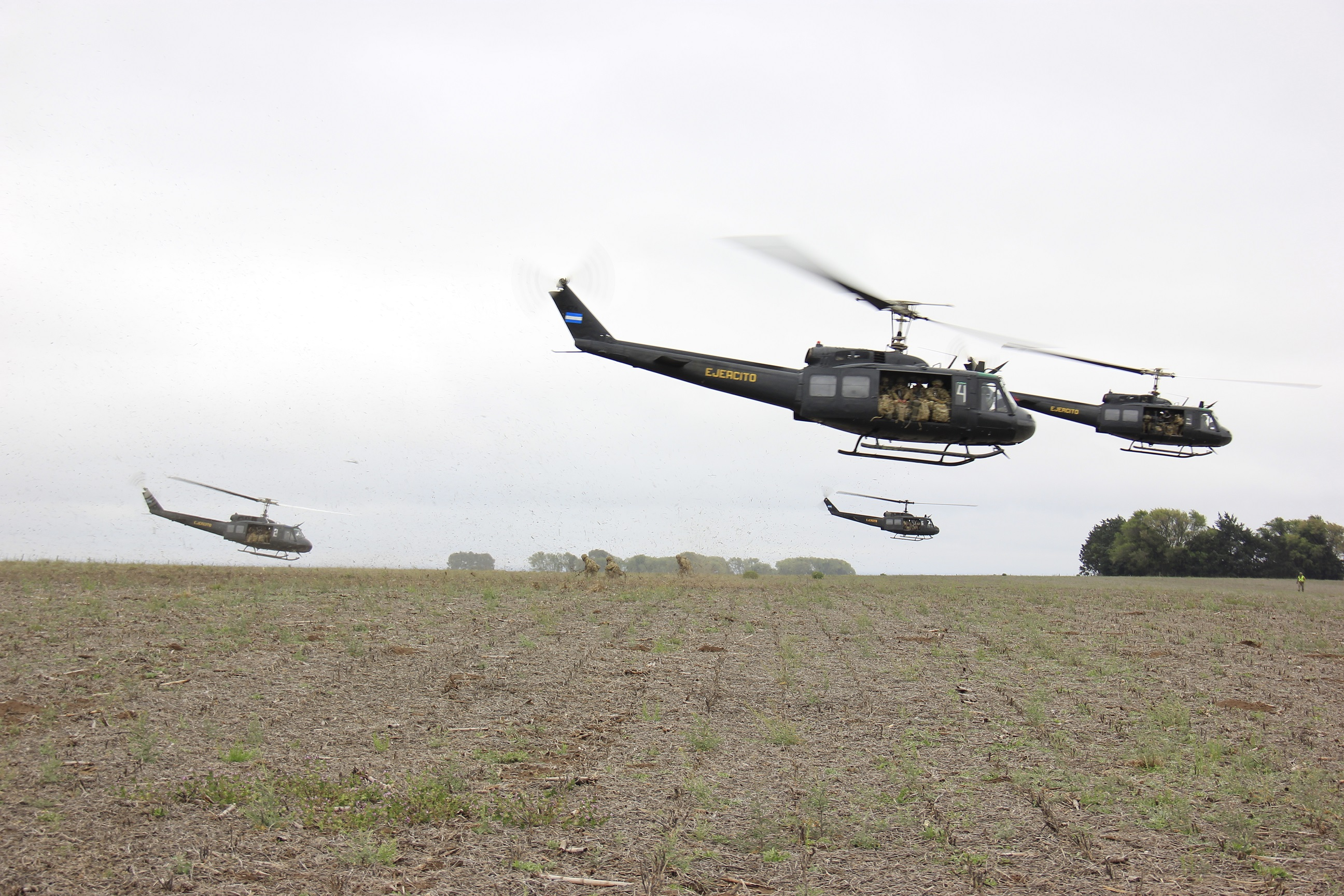
"Air cavalry" of the Argentine Army.

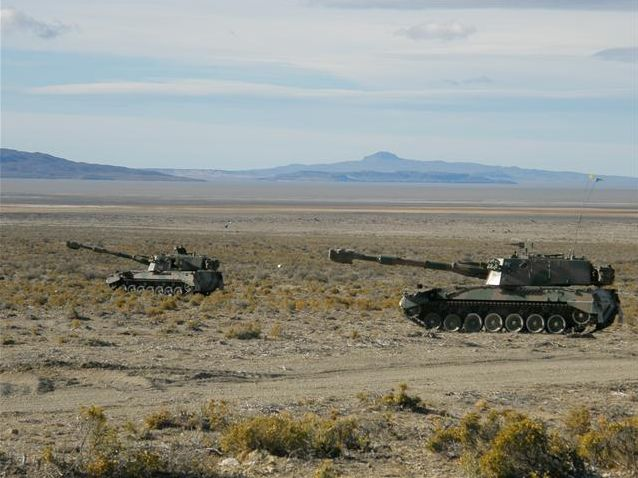
Two TAM VCA in exercise.

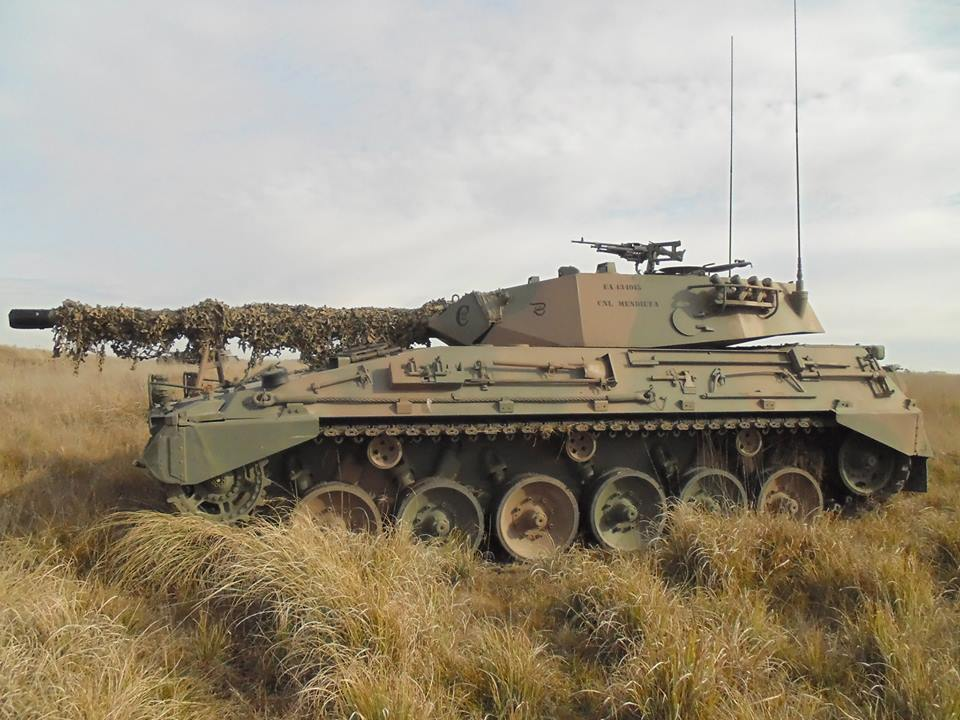
Medium Argentine Tank.

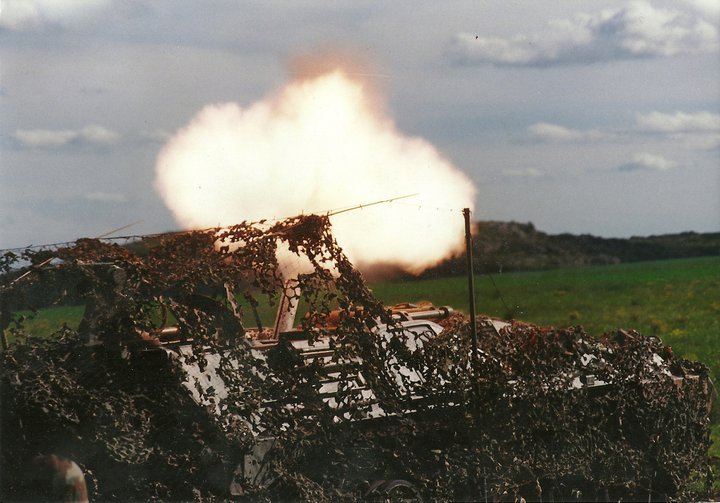
Self-propelled mortar VCTM opening fire.

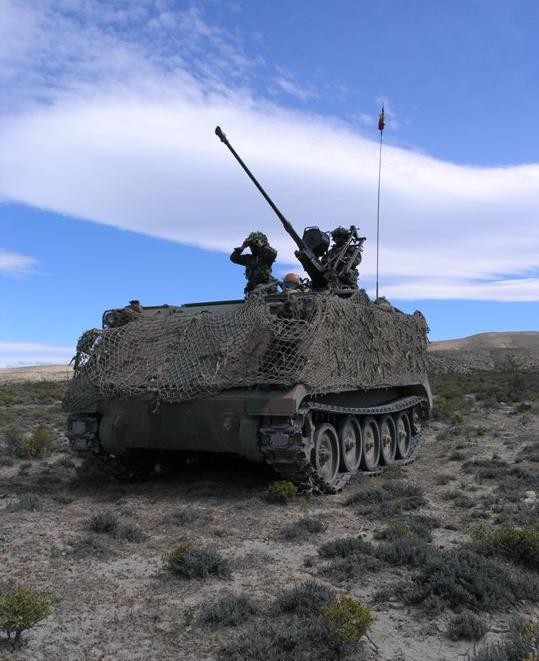
Argentine M-113 equipped with AA cannon.

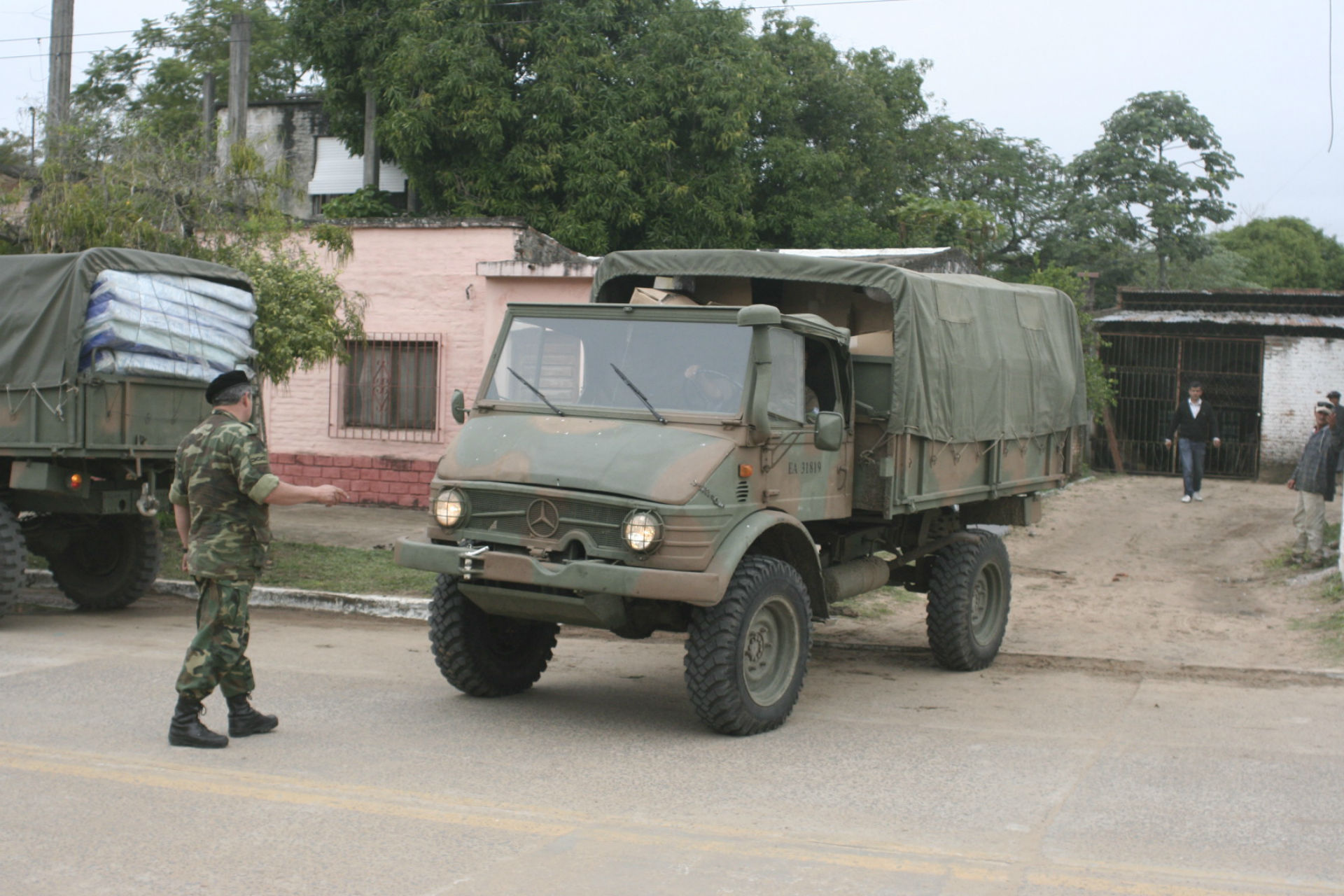
Unimog truck of the Argentine Army.

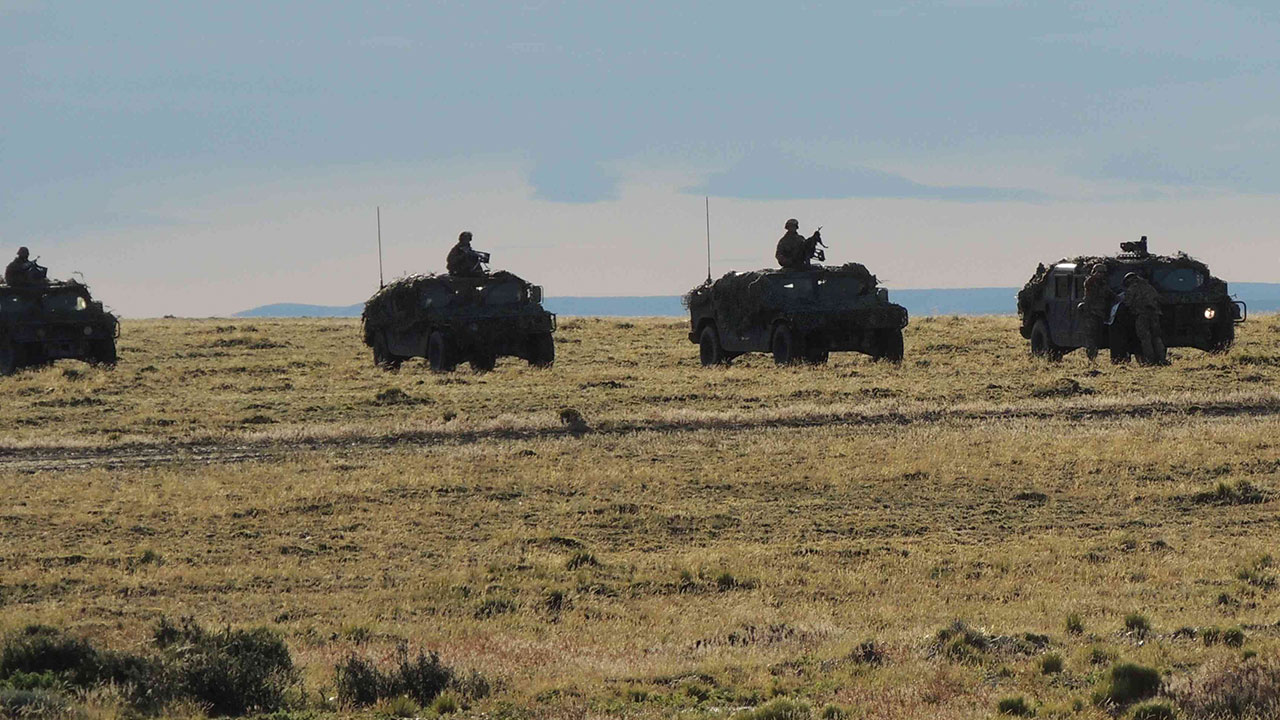
Argentine Army Exploration Squadron.

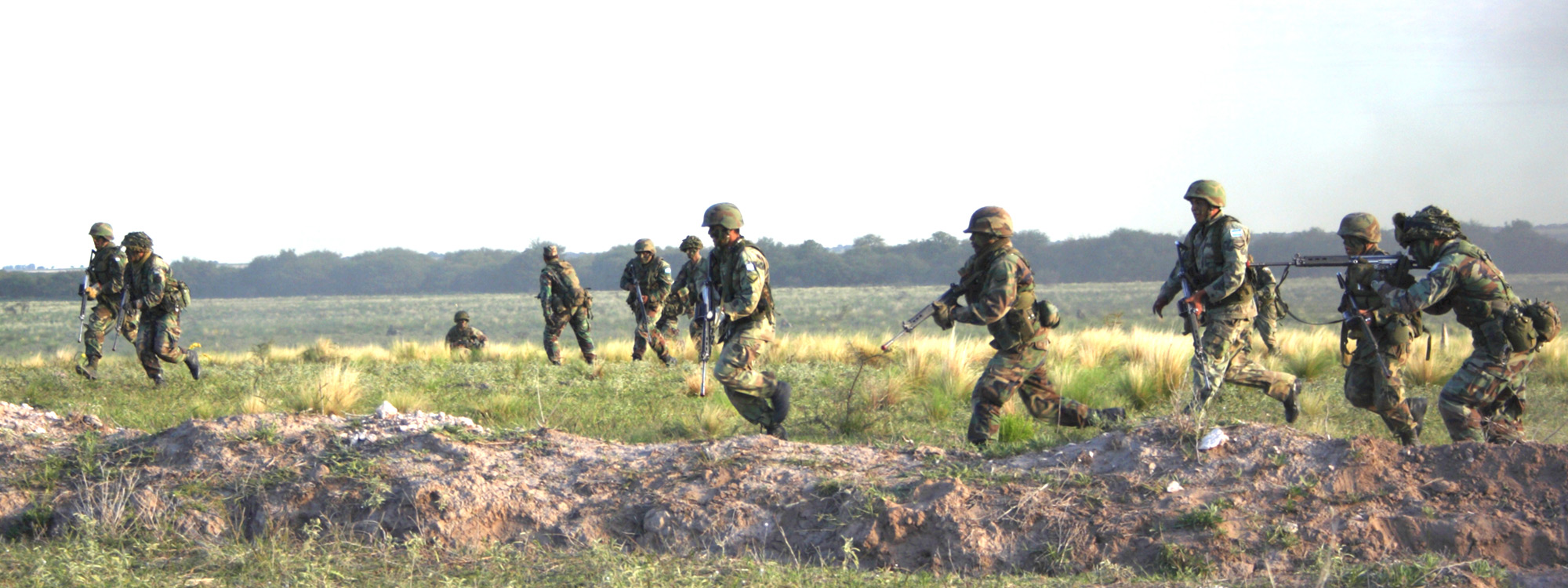
Argentine Infantry.

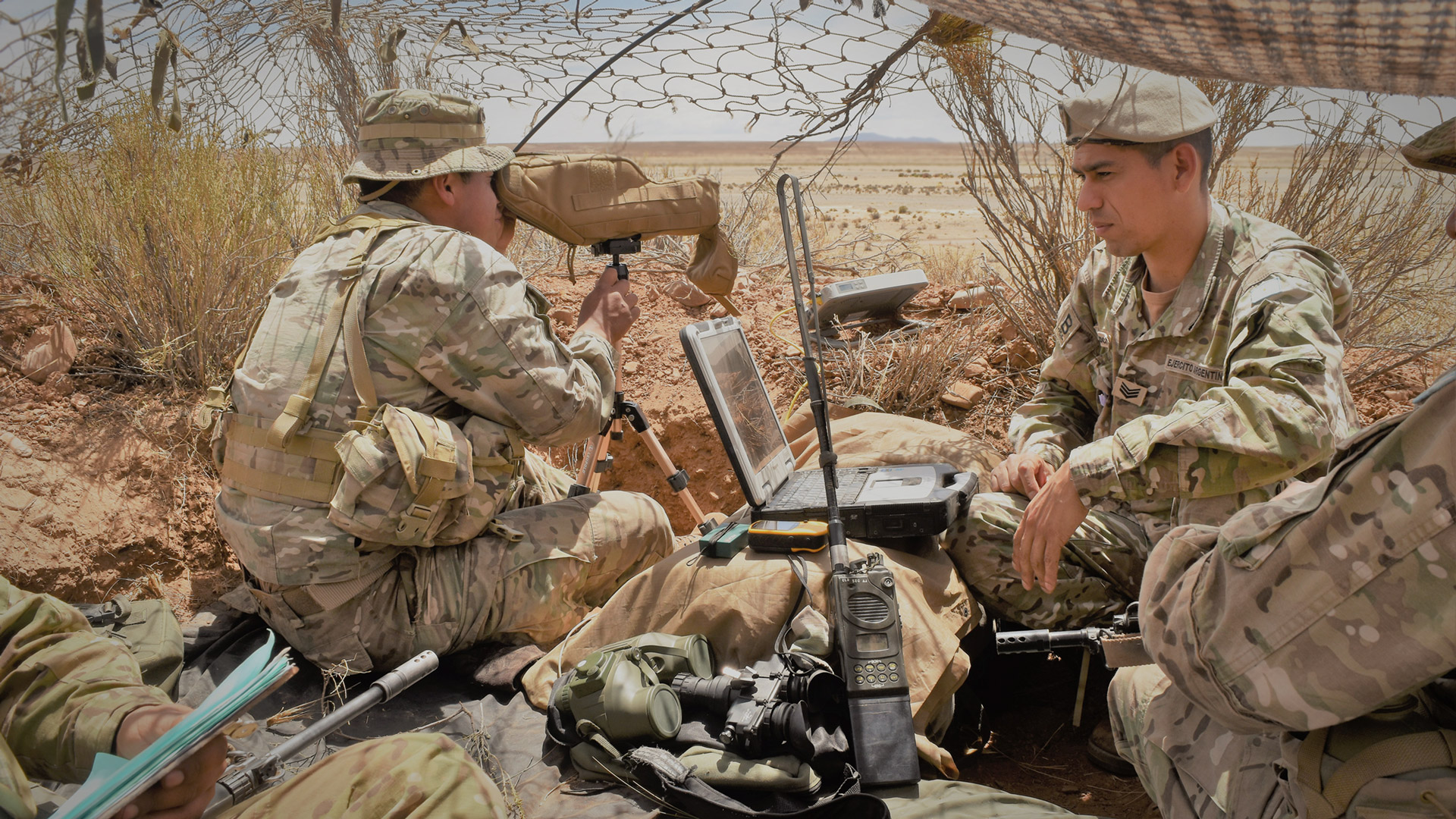
Argentine soldiers on surveillance at the border.

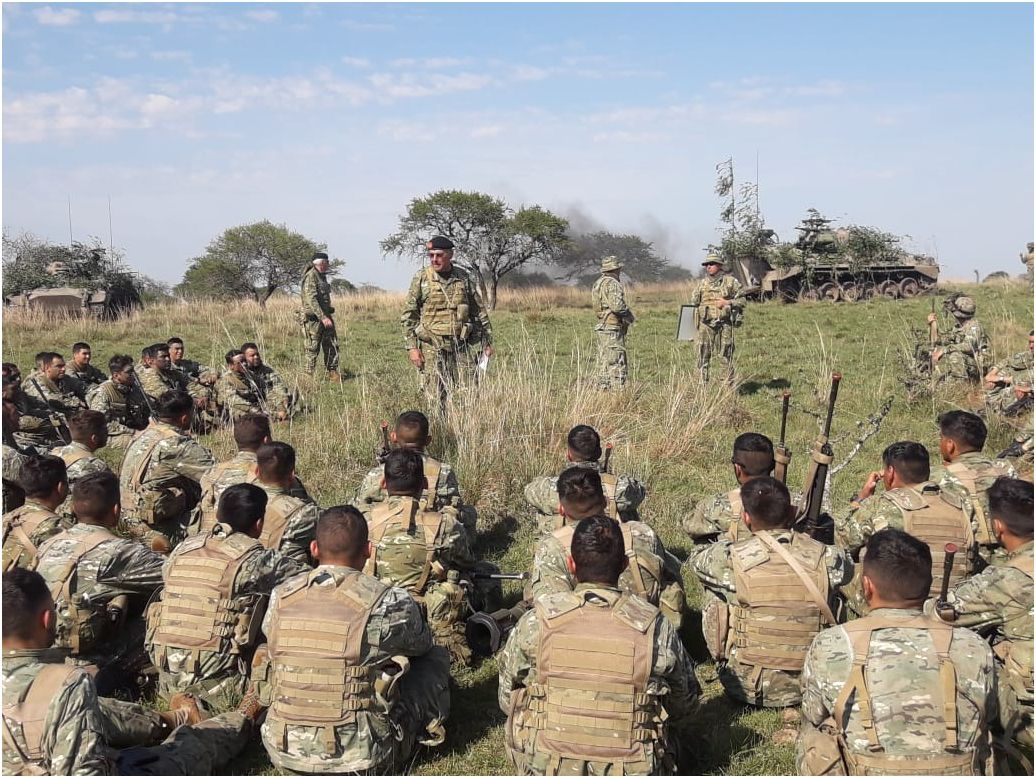
Argentine soldiers receiving instructions before exercise.

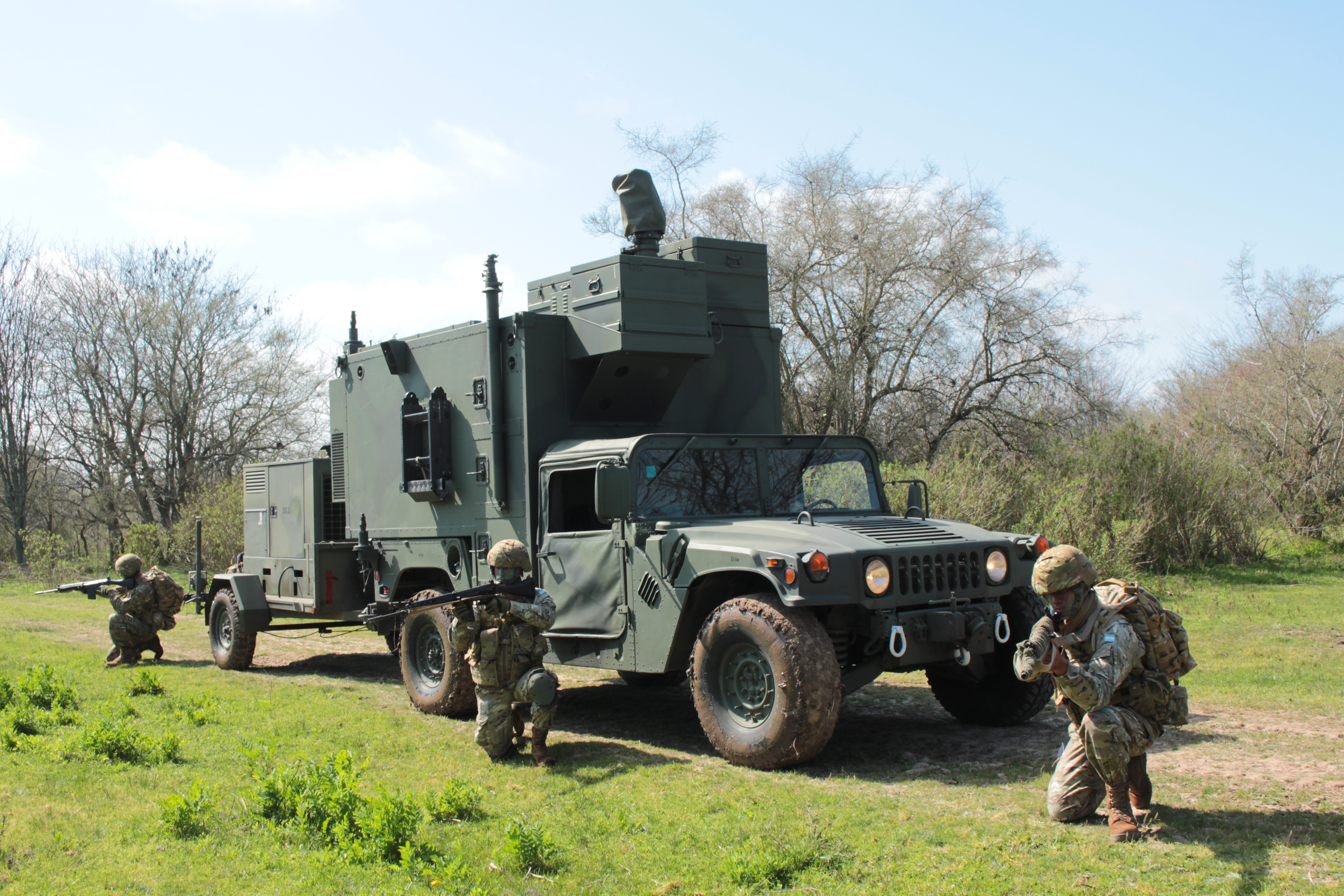
communications platoon of the Argentine army.

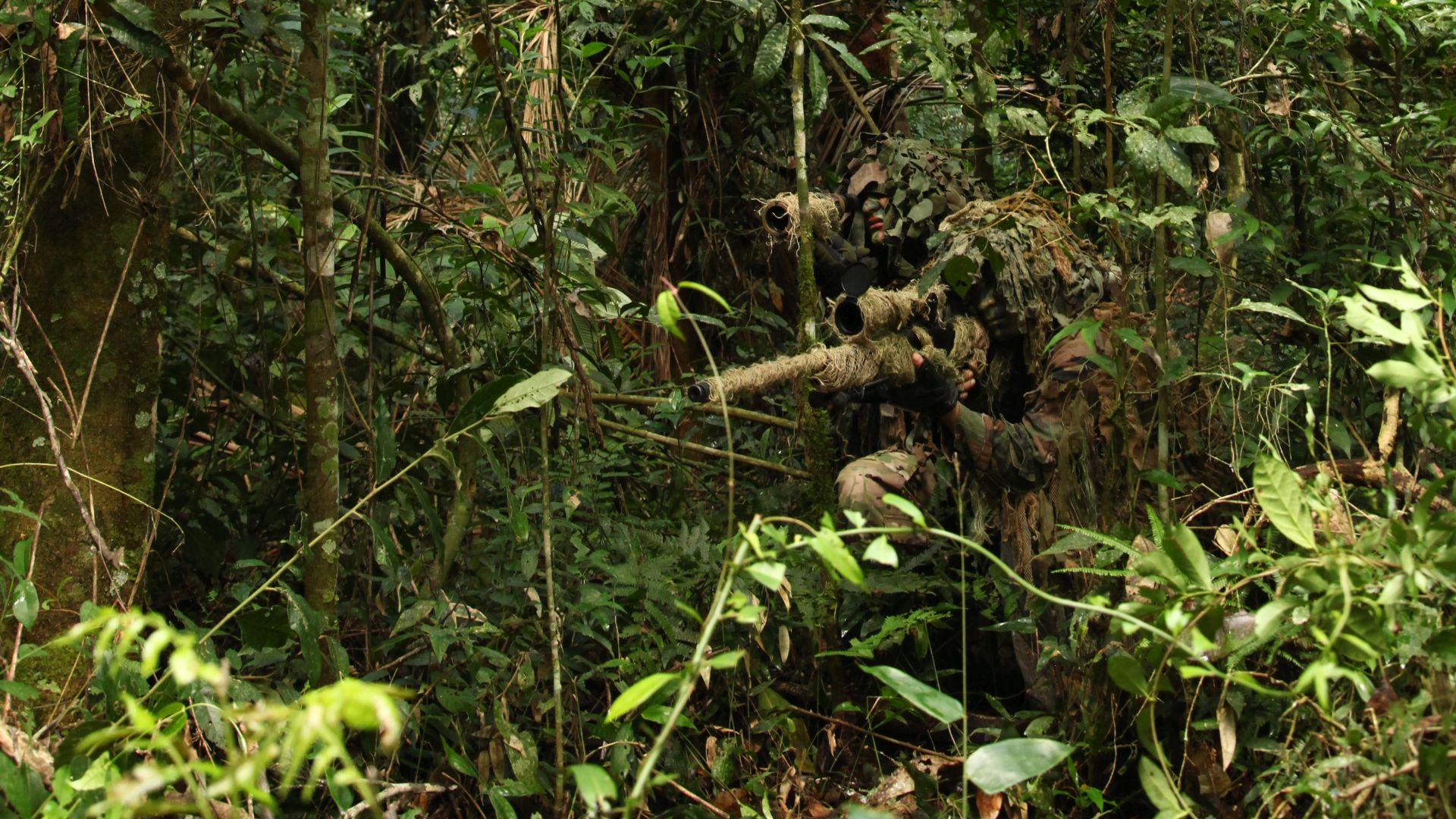
Argentine hunter infantry.

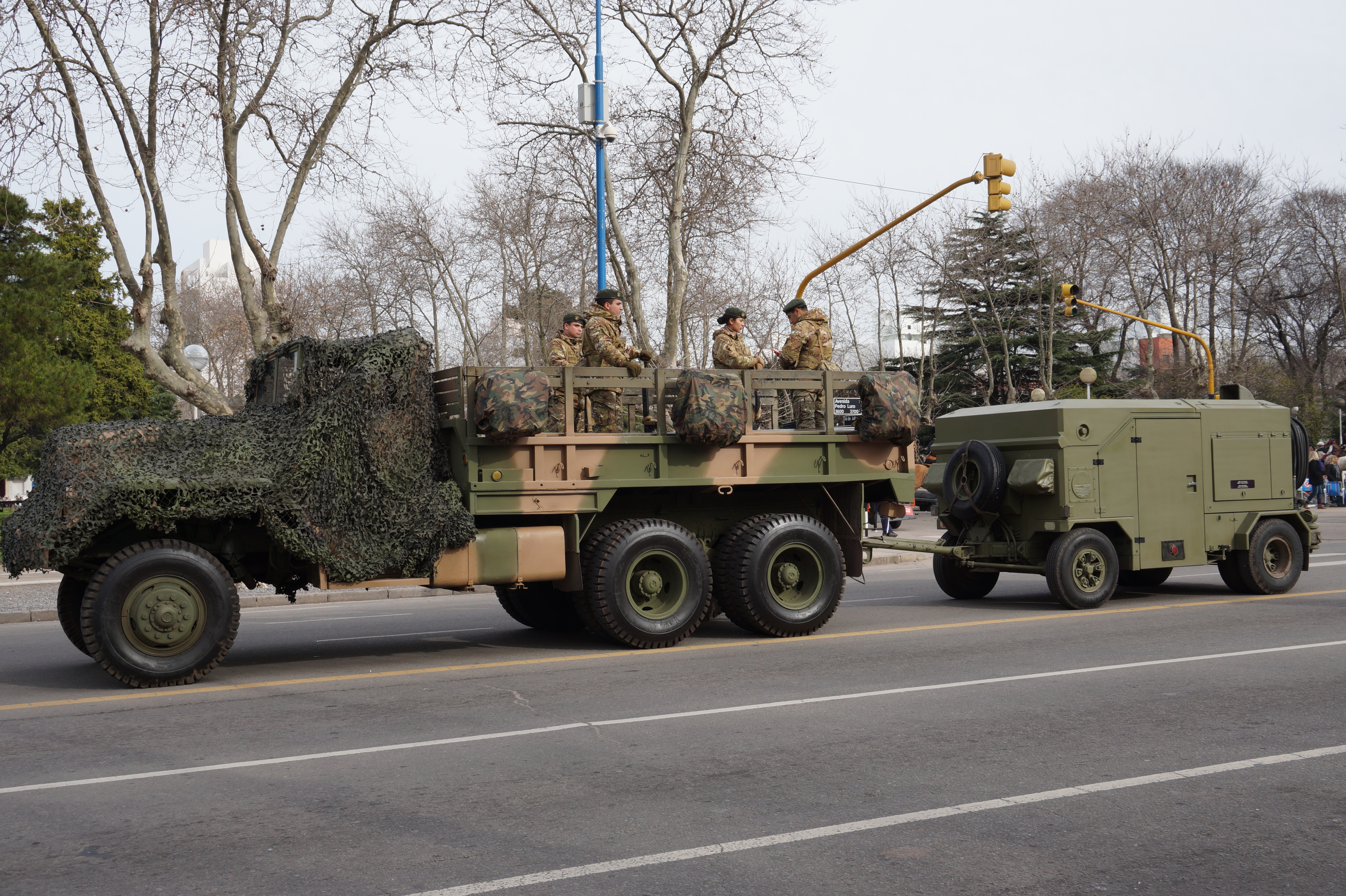
REO M35 truck

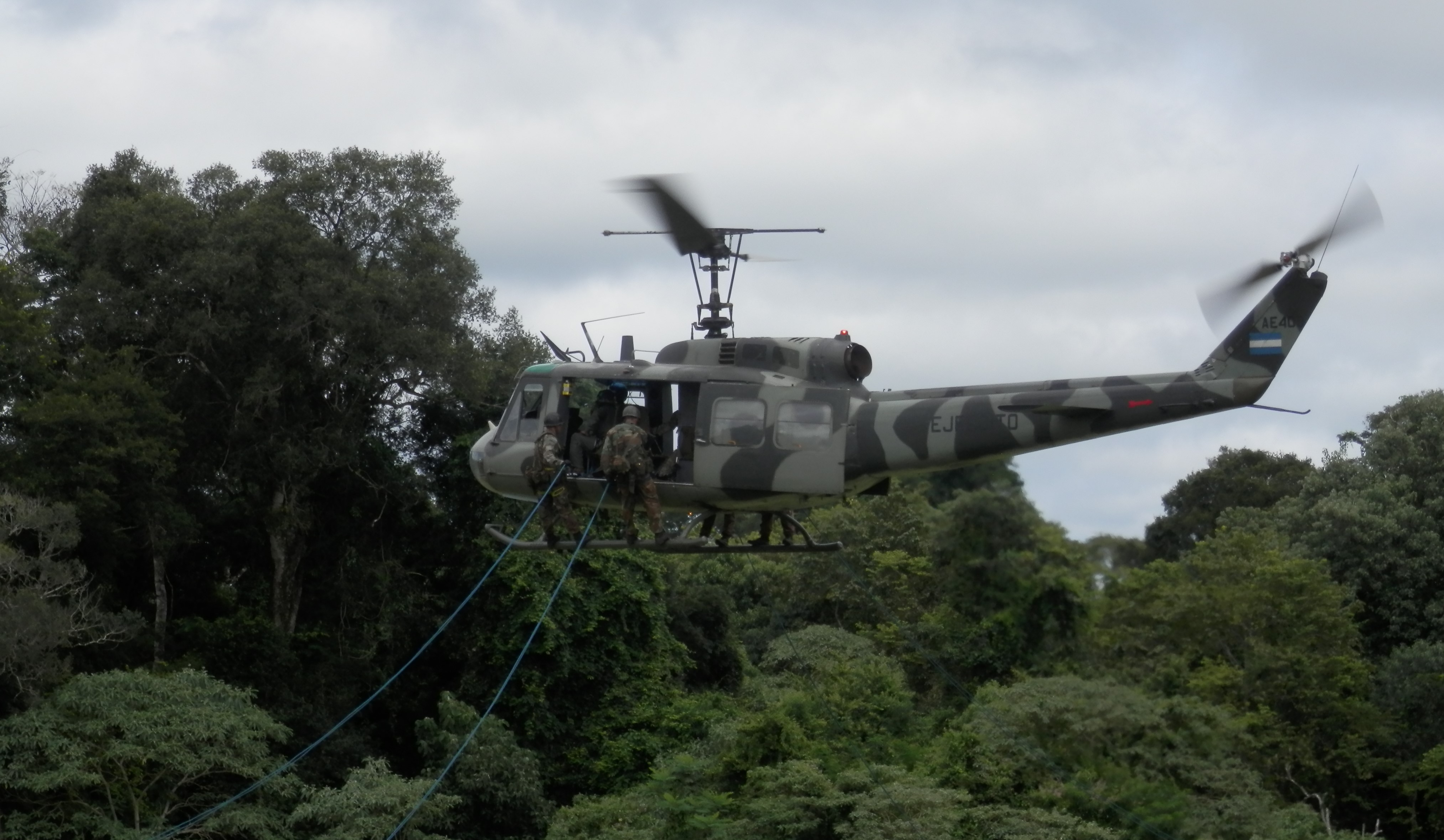
Bell UH-1 Huey of the Argentine Army

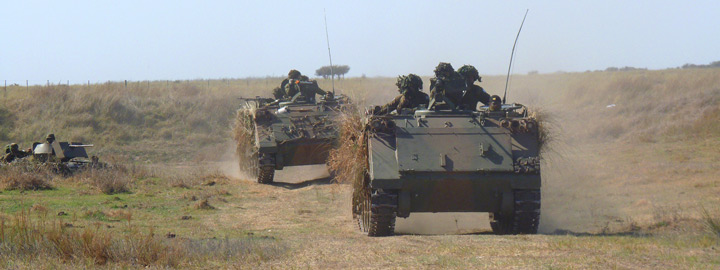
Armored infantry in M-113s

== See also ==
- Argentine Naval Aviation
- Argentine Army Aviation
- Equipment of the Argentine Army
