= FMK-3 mine =

Argentine anti-tank blast mine

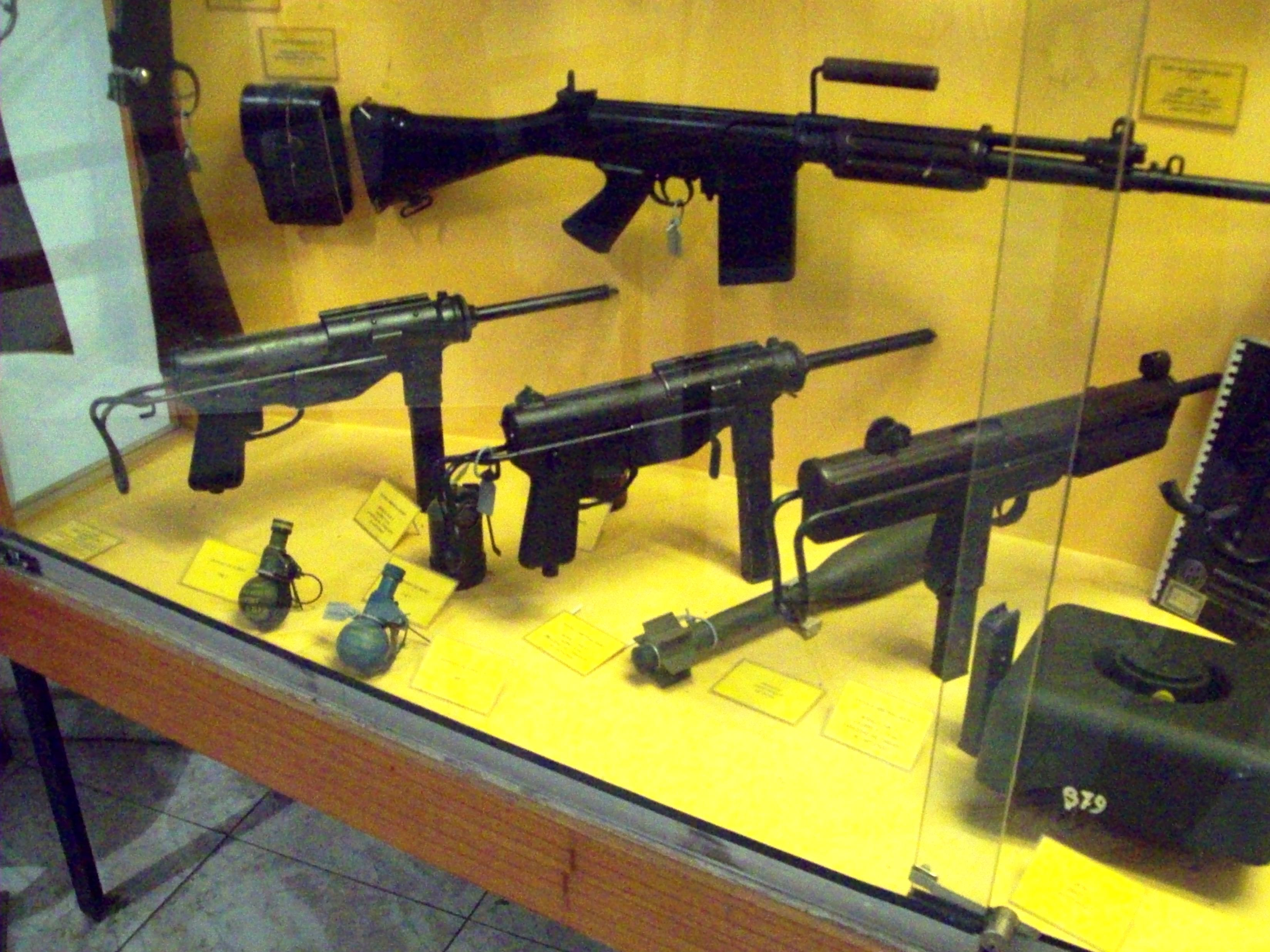

The FMK-3 is a fibreglass cased Argentine anti-tank blast mine. It is produced by Direccion General de Fabricaciones Militares. The mine actually uses a FMK-1 anti-personnel mine as a fuze, the FMK-1 is modified with a pressure cap to increase the activation pressure. Argentina's stock of FMK-1 mines was modified in 2003 to prevent their use as anti-personnel mines, this involved welded an additional plastic pressure cap onto the mine. The mine has very little metal content, although an optional detection ring is provided with the FMK-1.

It is found in the Falkland Islands.

== Specifications ==
- Weight: 7.1 kg
- Explosive content: 6.1 kg of RDX/TNT and Wax
- Length: 250 mm
- Height: 90 mm
- Width: 250 mm
- Operating pressure: 150 to 250 kg. 300 kg (post 2003)

== See also ==
- The FMK-5 mine is similar but uses a round case.
- Not to be confused with the FMK-3 submachine gun.
