= List of erethizontids =

Species in mammal family Erethizontidae

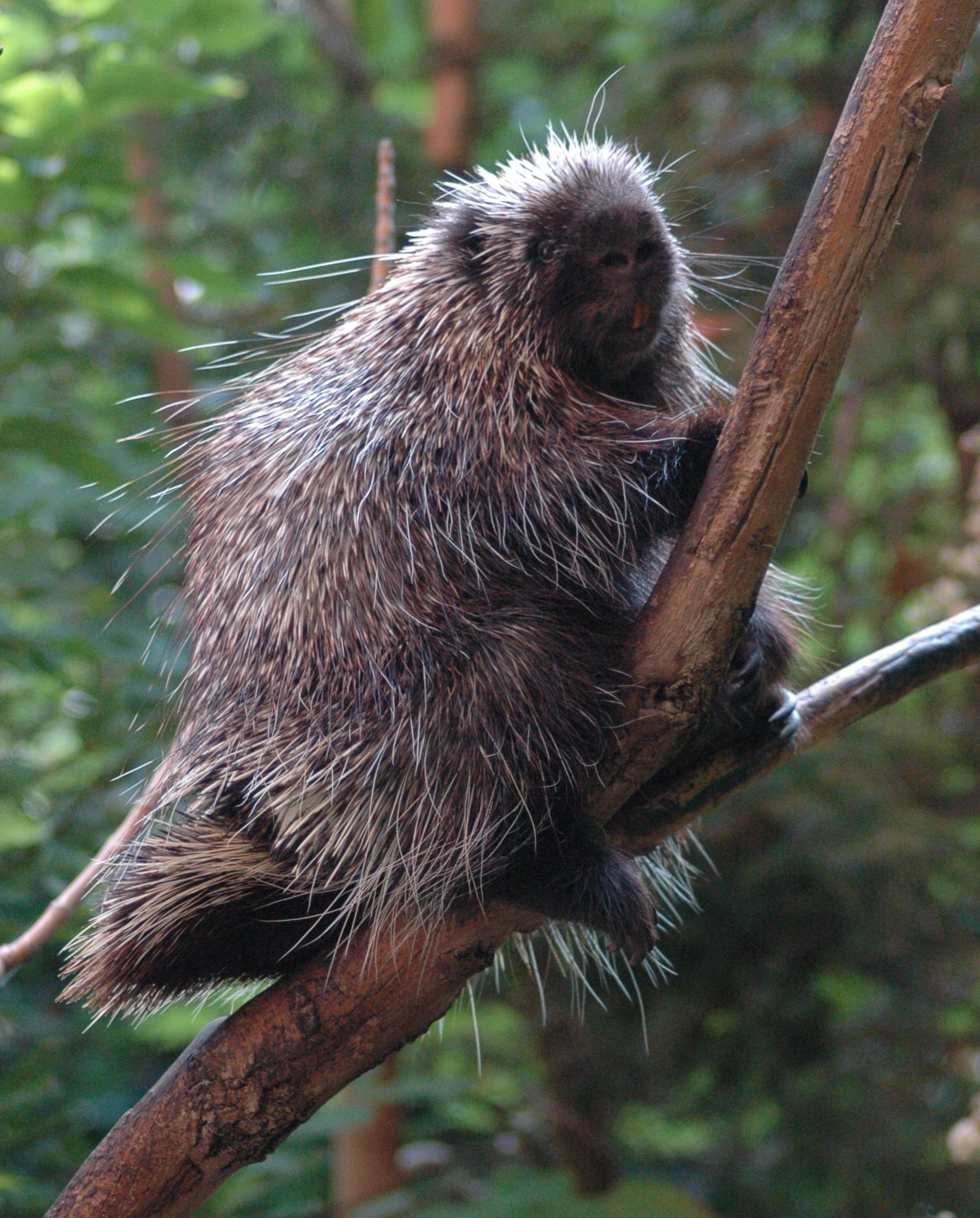
North American porcupine (Erethizon dorsatum)

Erethizontidae is a family of mammals in the order Rodentia and part of the Caviomorpha parvorder. Members of this family are called erethizontids or New World porcupines. They are found in North America, Central America, and South America, primarily in forests, though some species can be found in shrublands, grasslands, and savannas. They range in size from the Paraguaian hairy dwarf porcupine, at 24 cm (9 in) plus a 9 cm (4 in) tail, to the North American porcupine, at 130 cm (51 in) plus a 25 cm (10 in) tail. Erethizontids are herbivores and primarily eat leaves, stems, fruit, flowers, and roots. No erethizontids have population estimates and none are categorized as an endangered species or critically endangered.

The eighteen extant species of Erethizontidae are divided into two subfamilies: Chaetomyinae consists of a single species, the bristle-spined rat, and Erethizontinae contains seventeen species of porcupines in two genera. A few extinct prehistoric erethizontid species have been discovered, though due to ongoing research and discoveries, the exact number and categorization is not fixed.

== Conventions ==
IUCN Red List categories
Conservation status
- EX: Extinct (0 species)
- EW: Extinct in the wild (0 species)
- CR: Critically endangered (0 species)
- EN: Endangered (0 species)
- VU: Vulnerable (2 species)
- NT: Near threatened (0 species)
- LC: Least concern (9 species)

Other categories
- DD: Data deficient (6 species)
- NE: Not evaluated (1 species)

The author citation for the species or genus is given after the scientific name; parentheses around the author citation indicate that this was not the original taxonomic placement. Conservation status codes listed follow the International Union for Conservation of Nature (IUCN) Red List of Threatened Species. Range maps are provided wherever possible; if a range map is not available, a description of the erethizontid's range is provided. Ranges are based on the IUCN Red List for that species unless otherwise noted.

== Classification ==
Erethizontidae is a family consisting of eighteen extant species in three genera, divided between two subfamilies. Chaetomyinae consists of a single species, and Erethizontinae contains seventeen species of porcupines in two genera.

- Family Erethizontidae
  - Subfamily Chaetomyinae
    - Genus Chaetomys (bristle-spined rat): one species
  - Subfamily Erethizontinae
    - Genus Coendou (prehensile-tailed porcupines): sixteen species
    - Genus Erethizon (North American porcupine): one species

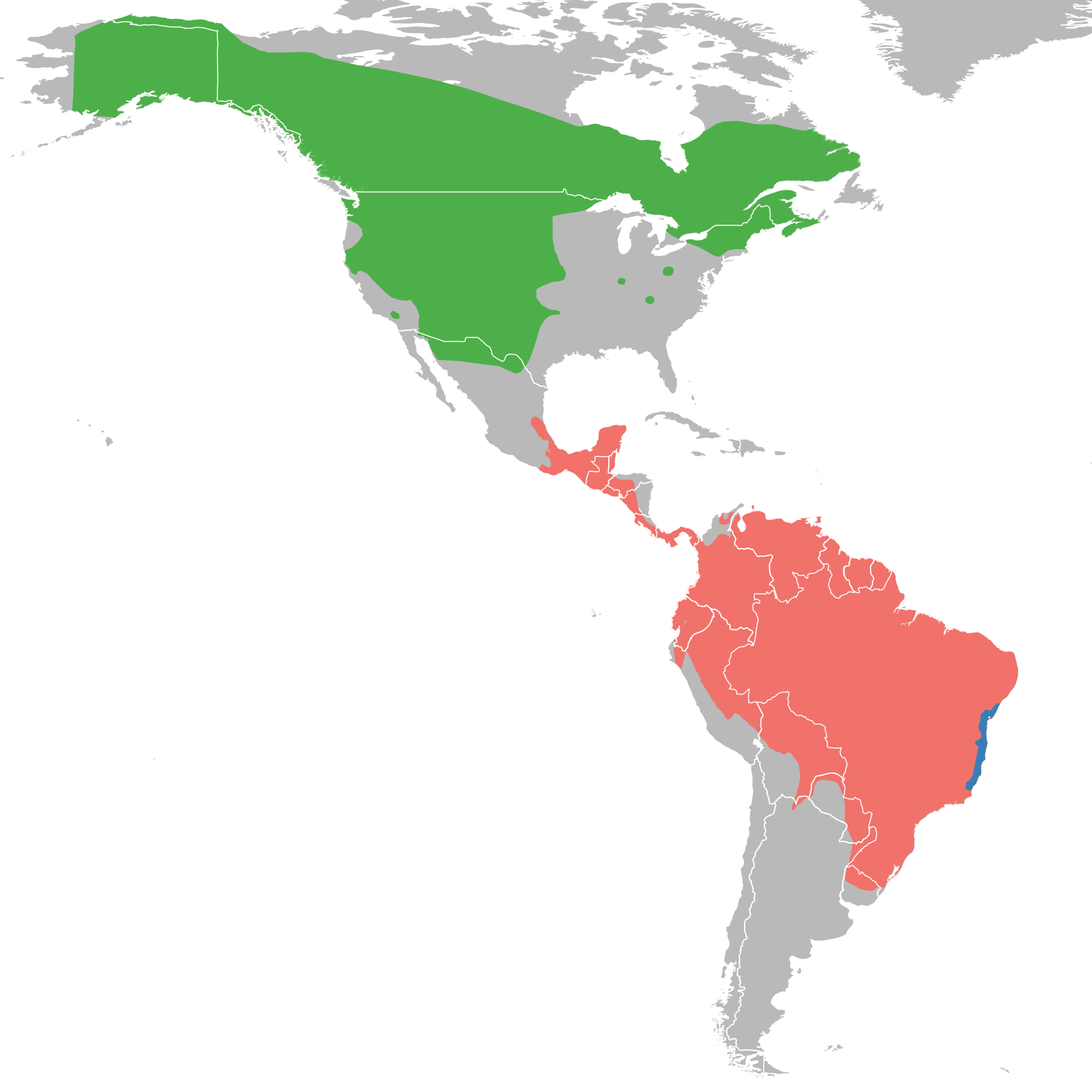
Erethizontidae distribution. Coendou in red, Erethizon in green, Chaetomys in blue (overlaps Coendou range).

== Erethizontids ==
The following classification is based on the taxonomy described by the reference work Mammal Species of the World (2005), with augmentation by generally accepted proposals made since using molecular phylogenetic analysis, as supported by both the IUCN and the American Society of Mammalogists.

=== Subfamily Chaetomyinae ===
Genus Chaetomys – J. E Gray, 1843 – one species
| Common name | Scientific name and subspecies | Range | Size and ecology | IUCN status and estimated population |
|---|---|---|---|---|
| Bristle-spined rat | C. subspinosus (Olfers, 1818) | Eastern Brazil | Size: 36–45 cm (14–18 in) long, plus 26–27 cm (10–11 in) tail Habitat: Forest Diet: Nuts | VU Unknown |

=== Subfamily Erethizontinae ===
Genus Coendou – Lacépède, 1799 – sixteen species
| Common name | Scientific name and subspecies | Range | Size and ecology | IUCN status and estimated population |
|---|---|---|---|---|
| Andean porcupine | C. quichua Thomas, 1899 | Panama and northeastern South America | Size: 33–44 cm (13–17 in) long, plus 26–41 cm (10–16 in) tail Habitat: Forest Diet: Leaves, stems, fruit, flowers, and roots | DD Unknown |
| Bahia porcupine | C. insidiosus (Olfers, 1818) | Eastern Brazil | Size: 29–35 cm (11–14 in) long, plus 18–22 cm (7–9 in) tail Habitat: Forest Diet: Leaves, stems, fruit, flowers, and roots | LC Unknown |
| Baturite porcupine | C. baturitensis Feijó & Langguth, 2013 | Northeastern Brazil | Size: 46–55 cm (18–22 in) long, plus 32–47 cm (13–19 in) tail Habitat: Forest Diet: Leaves, stems, fruit, flowers, and roots | DD Unknown |
| Bicolored-spined porcupine | C. bicolor (Tschudi, 1844) Four subspecies: C. b. bicolor; C. b. quichua; C. b. richardsoni; C. b. simonsi | Western and northwestern South America | Size: 38–50 cm (15–20 in) long, plus 33–54 cm (13–21 in) tail Habitat: Forest Diet: Leaves, stems, fruit, flowers, and roots | LC Unknown |
| Black dwarf porcupine | C. nycthemera (Olfers, 1818) | Northern Brazil | Size: 29–38 cm (11–15 in) long, plus 28–37 cm (11–15 in) tail Habitat: Forest Diet: Leaves, stems, fruit, flowers, and roots | DD Unknown |
| Black-tailed hairy dwarf porcupine | C. melanurus (Wagner, 1842) | Northern South America | Size: 28–38 cm (11–15 in) long, plus 22–36 cm (9–14 in) tail Habitat: Forest Diet: Leaves, stems, fruit, flowers, and roots | LC Unknown |
| Brazilian porcupine | C. prehensilis (Linnaeus, 1758) | South America | Size: 29–48 cm (11–19 in) long, plus 31–43 cm (12–17 in) tail Habitat: Forest Diet: Leaves, stems, fruit, flowers, and roots | LC Unknown |
| Brown hairy dwarf porcupine | C. vestitus Thomas, 1899 | Central Colombia | Size: 29–37 cm (11–15 in) long, plus 17–19 cm (7–7 in) tail Habitat: Forest Diet: Leaves, stems, fruit, flowers, and roots | DD Unknown |
| Dwarf porcupine | C. speratus Pontes, Gadelha, Melo, de Sá, Loss, Caldara Jr., Costa, & Leite, 2013 | Eastern Brazil | Size: 33–44 cm (13–17 in) long, plus 29–32 cm (11–13 in) tail Habitat: Forest Diet: Leaves, stems, fruit, flowers, and roots | VU Unknown |
| Frosted hairy dwarf porcupine | C. pruinosus Thomas, 1905 | Colombia and Venezuela | Size: 32–38 cm (13–15 in) long, plus about 19 cm (7 in) tail Habitat: Forest Diet: Leaves, stems, fruit, flowers, and roots | LC Unknown |
| Mexican hairy dwarf porcupine | C. mexicanus (Kerr, 1792) | Mexico and Central America | Size: 35–46 cm (14–18 in) long, plus 20–36 cm (8–14 in) tail Habitat: Forest Diet: Leaves, stems, fruit, flowers, and roots | LC Unknown |
| Paraguaian hairy dwarf porcupine | C. spinosus (Cuvier, 1822) | Southeastern South America | Size: 24–55 cm (9–22 in) long, plus 20–38 cm (8–15 in) tail Habitat: Forest and savanna Diet: Leaves, stems, fruit, flowers, and roots | LC Unknown |
| Roosmalen's dwarf porcupine | C. roosmalenorum Voss & da Silva, 2001 | Western Brazil | Size: About 29 cm (11 in) long, plus about 26 cm (10 in) tail Habitat: Forest Diet: Leaves, stems, fruit, flowers, and roots | DD Unknown |
| Rothschild's porcupine | C. rothschildi Thomas, 1902 | Panama | Size: 33–44 cm (13–17 in) long, plus 26–41 cm (10–16 in) tail Habitat: Forest Diet: Leaves, stems, fruit, flowers, and roots | NE Unknown |
| Streaked dwarf porcupine | C. ichillus Voss & da Silva, 2001 | Eastern Ecuador | Size: 26–29 cm (10–11 in) long, plus 21–25 cm (8–10 in) tail Habitat: Forest Diet: Leaves, stems, fruit, flowers, and roots | DD Unknown |
| Stump-tailed porcupine | C. rufescens (J. E. Gray, 1865) | Northwestern and central South America | Size: 31–37 cm (12–15 in) long, plus 10–15 cm (4–6 in) tail Habitat: Forest Diet: Leaves, stems, fruit, flowers, and roots | LC Unknown |

Genus Erethizon – F. Cuvier, 1823 – one species
| Common name | Scientific name and subspecies | Range | Size and ecology | IUCN status and estimated population |
|---|---|---|---|---|
| North American porcupine | E. dorsatum (Linnaeus, 1758) Seven subspecies: E. d. bruneri; E. d. couesi; E. d. dorsata; E. d. epixanthus; E. d. myops; E. d. nigrescens; E. d. picinum | North America | Size: 60–130 cm (24–51 in) long, plus 16–25 cm (6–10 in) tail Habitat: Forest, shrubland, and grassland Diet: Buds, twigs, roots, stems, leaves, flowers, seeds, berries, nuts, and other vegetation | LC Unknown |

== Sources ==
- Chernasky, Amy; Motis, Anna; Burgin, Connor, eds. (2023). All the Mammals of the World. Lynx Nature Books. ISBN 978-84-16728-66-4.
- Nowak, Ronald M. (1999). Walker's Mammals of the World. Vol. 2 (6th ed.). Johns Hopkins University Press. ISBN 978-0-8018-5789-8.
- Woods, Charles A.; Kilpatrick, C. William (2005). Wilson, Don E.; Reeder, DeeAnn M. (eds.). Mammal Species of the World. Vol. 2 (3rd ed.). Johns Hopkins University Press. ISBN 978-0-8018-8221-0.
