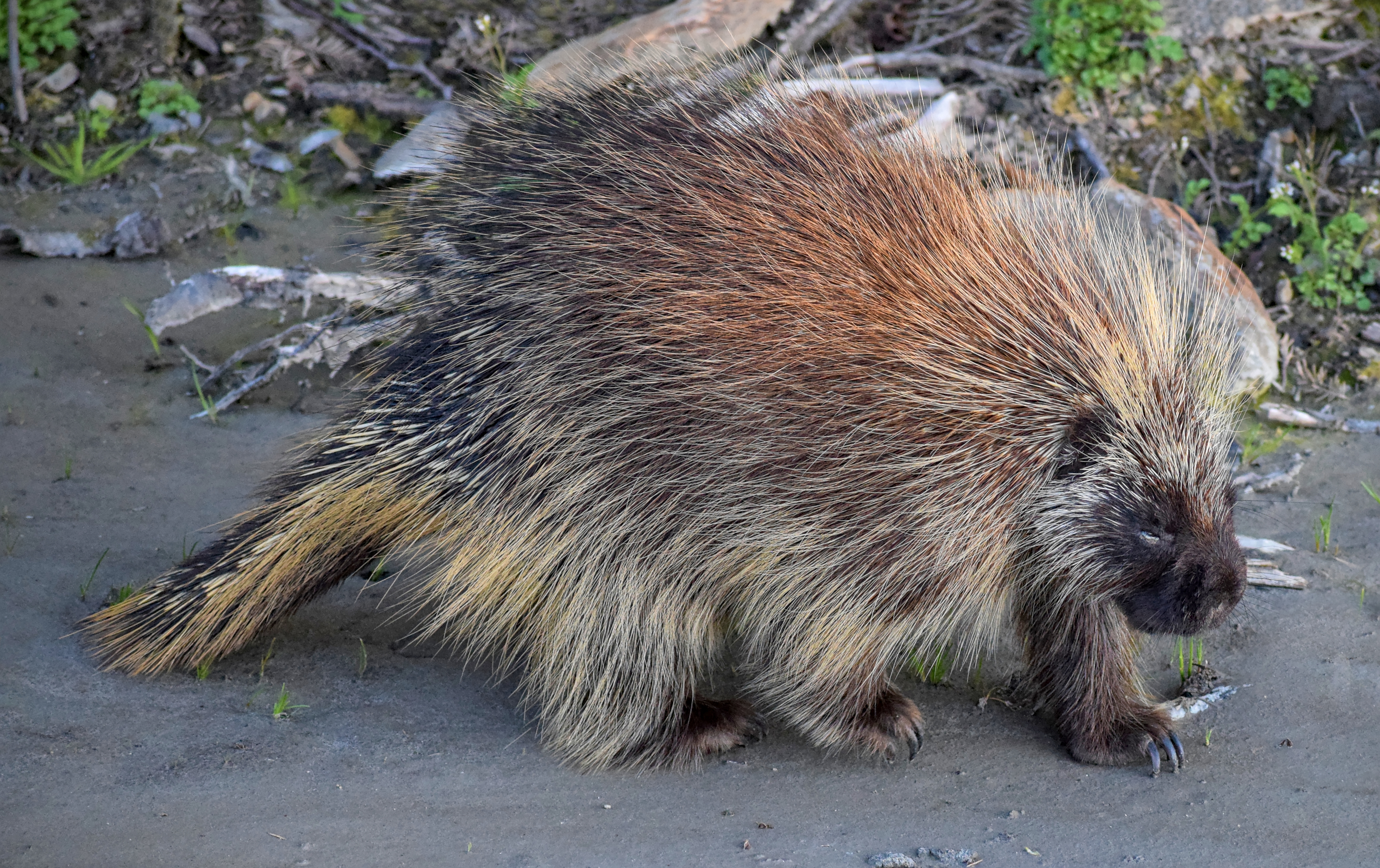
- North American porcupine

Scientific classification
- Kingdom: Animalia
- Phylum: Chordata
- Class: Mammalia
- Order: Rodentia
- Suborder: Hystricomorpha
- Infraorder: Hystricognathi

Groups included
- Hystricidae (Old World porcupines); Erethizontidae (New World porcupines)

Cladistically included but traditionally excluded taxa
- †Bathyergoididae; Bathyergidae; †Myophiomyidae; †Diamantomyidae; †Phiomyidae; †Kenyamyidae; Petromuridae; Thryonomyidae; Chinchillidae; †Neoepiblemidae; Dinomyidae; †Cephalomyidae; †Eocardiidae; Caviidae; Dasyproctidae; Cuniculidae; Ctenomyidae; Octodontidae; Abrocomidae; Echimyidae; Myocastoridae; Capromyidae; †Heptaxodontidae

= Porcupine =

Rodent with a coat of sharp spines

Porcupines are large rodents with coats of sharp spines, or quills, that protect them against predators. The term covers two families of animals, the Old World porcupines in the family Hystricidae, and the New World porcupines in the family Erethizontidae. Both families display superficially similar coats of rigid or semirigid quills, which are modified hairs composed of keratin, and belong to the infraorder Hystricognathi within the diverse order Rodentia. The two groups are distinct and are not closely related to each other within the Hystricognathi. The largest species of porcupine is the third-largest living rodent in the world, after the capybara and beaver.

The Old World (Hystricidae) live in Italy, West and South Asia, and most of Africa. They are large, terrestrial, and strictly nocturnal. New World porcupines (Erethizontidae) are indigenous to North America and northern South America. They live in wooded areas and can climb trees, where some species spend their entire lives. They are generally smaller than their Old World counterparts and are less strictly nocturnal.

Most porcupines are about 60–90 cm (25–36 in) long, with a 20–25 cm (8–10 in) long tail. Weighing 5–16 kg (12–35 lb), they are rounded, large, and slow. Their colouration consists of various shades of brown, grey, and white. Porcupines have various methods to defend themselves from predators, the most prominent being the use of their quills, which advertises their unsuitability for being preyed upon. This strategy is known as aposematism. To some degree, the spiny protection resembles that of the hedgehogs, echidnas, and tenrecs, none of which share any spiny ancestors; all of them, and also the Old World and New World porcupines, are products of convergent evolution. The spines of the various groups also vary markedly.

Humans have a varied history with porcupines, with some cultures considering them symbols of self-defense or cautiousness. Porcupines appear in mythology in regions where the animal has economic significance, such as for food or in the production of quillwork textiles.

== Terminology and etymology ==
The word "porcupine" comes from the Latin porcus 'pig' + spina 'spine, quill', from Old Italian porcospino, 'thorn-pig'. A regional American name for the animal is "quill-pig".

A baby porcupine is known as a porcupette. When born, a porcupette's quills are soft hair; they harden within a few days, forming the sharp quills of adults.

== Taxonomy and evolution ==
=== Classification ===
A porcupine is any of 29 species of rodents belonging to the families Erethizontidae (genera: Coendou, Erethizon, and Chaetomys) or Hystricidae (genera: Atherurus, Hystrix, and Trichys). The two families of porcupines are quite different, and although both belong to the Hystricognathi branch of the vast order Rodentia, they are not closely related.

Porcupines are distributed into two evolutionarily independent groups within the infraorder Hystricognathi, part of the suborder Hystricomorpha of the Rodentia:

- Parvorder incertae sedis (formerly Phiomorpha)
  - Family Hystricidae: Old World porcupines
    - African brush-tailed porcupine, Atherurus africanus
    - African crested porcupine, Hystrix cristata
    - Asiatic brush-tailed porcupine, Atherurus macrourus
    - Cape porcupine, Hystrix africaeaustralis
    - Indian crested porcupine, Hystrix indicus
    - Malayan porcupine, Hystrix brachyura
    - Sunda porcupine, Hystrix javanica
    - Sumatran porcupine, Hystrix (Thecurus) sumatrae
    - Thick-spined porcupine, Hystrix (Thecurus) crassispinis
    - Philippine porcupine, Hystrix (Thecurus) pumilis
    - Long-tailed porcupine, Trichys fasciculata
- Parvorder Caviomorpha
  - Family Erethizontidae: New World porcupines
    - North American porcupine, Erethizon dorsatum
    - Brazilian porcupine, Coendou prehensilis
    - Bicolored-spined porcupine, Coendou bicolor
    - Andean porcupine, Coendou quichua
    - Black dwarf (Koopman's) porcupine, Coendou nycthemera
    - Rothschild's porcupine, Coendou rothschildi
    - Santa Marta porcupine, Coendou sanctemartae
    - Mexican hairy dwarf porcupine, Coendou mexicanus
    - Paraguaian hairy dwarf porcupine, Coendou spinosus
    - Bahia porcupine, Coendou insidiosus
    - Brown hairy dwarf porcupine, Coendou vestitus
    - Streaked dwarf porcupine, Coendou ichillus
    - Black-tailed hairy dwarf porcupine, Coendou melanurus
    - Roosmalen's dwarf porcupine, Coendou roosmalenorum
    - Frosted hairy dwarf porcupine, Coendou pruinosus
    - Stump-tailed porcupine, Coendou rufescens
    - Bristle-spined porcupine, Chaetomys subspinosus (sometimes considered an echimyid)

=== Evolution ===
Studies on the physical characteristics of New World porcupines initially described them as being the most basal (earliest to diverge) group among the hystricognaths, and fossil records point to a common ancestor of the Erethizontidae and all other hystricognaths occurring 37.2 to 33.9 million years ago in the early Oligocene. Dorothée Huchon and Emmanuel Douzery wrote in 2001 on the diversification of the hystricognaths, reporting that molecular phylogenetic studies using nuclear genes (e.g., the von Willebrand factor gene) suggested that the Hystricidae (Old World porcupines), Phiomorpha, and Caviomorpha (which includes New World porcupines) lineages split some 63 to 43 million years ago. This supported a single colonization event of South America by hystricognaths. A 2013 study of nuclear and mitochondrial genomes supports a mid-Eocene diversification of New World hystricognaths, with family-level splits occurring in the early Miocene.

Fossils belonging to the genus Hystrix date back to the late Miocene of Africa and Asia. One of the oldest known porcupine fossils is Hystrix primigenia, an Old World porcupine that lived in the late Miocene to the Pliocene; the oldest known porcupine fossil in Asia, Hystrix lufengensis, dates back 8 million years, also in the late Miocene.

== Biology ==
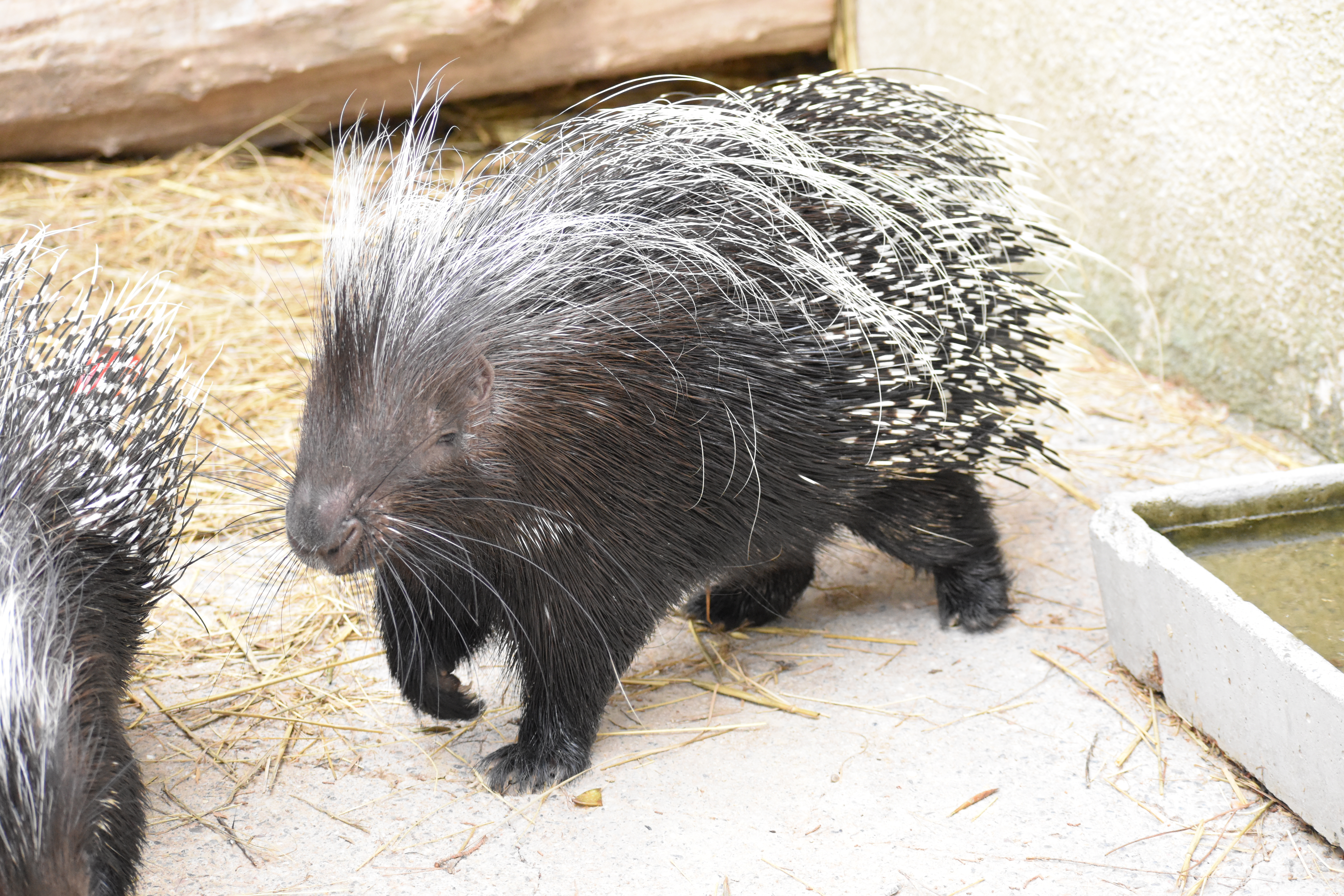
An Old World porcupine, the Cape porcupine

=== Old World compared with New World species ===
The 11 Old World porcupines tend to be fairly large and have spines grouped in clusters.

The two subfamilies of New World porcupines are mostly smaller (although the North American porcupine reaches about 85 cm (33 in) in length and 18 kg (40 lb)), have their quills attached singly rather than grouped in clusters, and are excellent climbers, spending much of their time in trees. The New World porcupines evolved their spines independently (through convergent evolution) and are more closely related to several other families of rodents than they are to the Old World porcupines.

The quills of New World porcupines are unique among spined rodents, being stiff with a circular cross-section that is small in proportion to their length, which allows them to penetrate further into a potential predator before breaking off near the base. In contrast, the spines of Old World porcupines are similar to those of other rodents with spiny hair, such as the bristly mouse and short-tailed spiny rat, in that they have a concave cross-section and are shorter and softer, making them break off closer to the tip.

=== Description ===
Porcupines are rodents of varying fur color that are characterized by their abundance of protruding spines, or quills, found all along the head and body of the animal. Some species have quills that extend from the tail, as well. They vary in size considerably: an adult Andean porcupine weighs roughly 2 kg (4.4 lb), while the crested porcupine can grow to weigh up to 27 kg (60 lb).

=== Longevity ===
Porcupines have relatively long lifespans and hold the record for being the longest-living rodent, with one individual named Cooper living over 32 years.

=== Diet ===
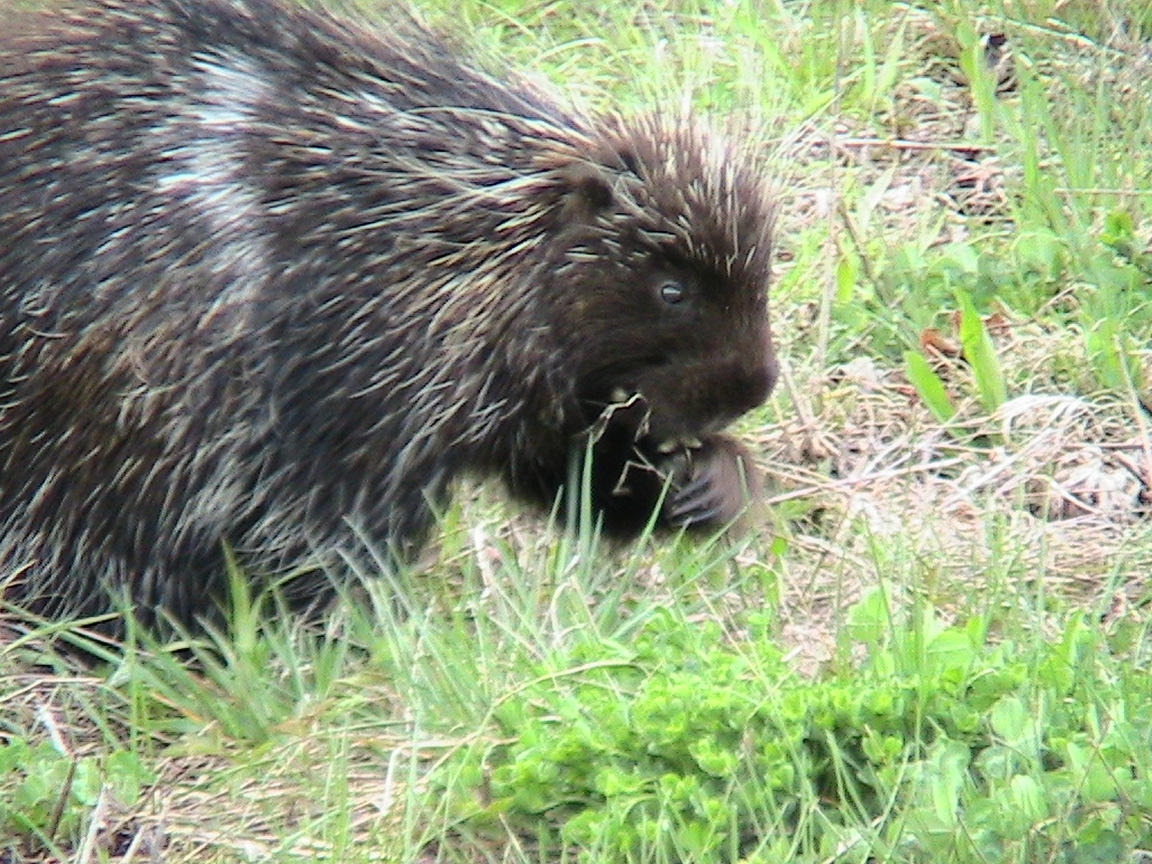
North American porcupine eating grass and clover

The North American porcupine is an herbivore and often climbs trees for food; it eats leaves, herbs, twigs, and green plants such as clover. In the winter, it may eat bark. The African porcupine is not a climber; instead, it forages on the ground. It is mostly nocturnal but sometimes forages for food during the day, eating bark, roots, fruits, berries, and farm crops. Porcupines have become a pest in Kenya and are eaten as a delicacy.

=== Defense ===
Defensive behaviour displays in a porcupine depend on sight, scent, and sound. Often, these displays are shown when a porcupine becomes agitated or annoyed. The four main displays seen in a porcupine are (in order from least to most aggressive) quill erection, teeth clattering, odour emission, and attack. A porcupine's colouring aids in part of its defence, as most of the predators are nocturnal and colour-blind. A porcupine's markings are black and white. The dark body and coarse hair of the porcupine are dark brown/black and when quills are raised, present a white strip down its back mimicking the look of a skunk. This, along with the raising of the sharp quills, deters predators. Along with the raising of the quills, porcupines clatter their teeth to warn predators not to approach. The incisors vibrate against each other, the strike zone shifts back, and the cheek teeth clatter. This behaviour is often paired with body shivering, which is used to further display the dangerous quills. The rattling of quills is aided by the hollow quills at the back end of the porcupine. The use of odour is when the sight and sound have failed. An unpleasant scent is produced from the skin above the tail in times of stress and is often seen with a quill erection. If these processes fail, the porcupine attacks by running sideways or backwards into predators. A porcupine's tail can also be swung in the direction of the predator. Notably, their quills allow porcupines to impale potential predators, injuring them or even causing their death (antipredatory killing).

==== Quills ====
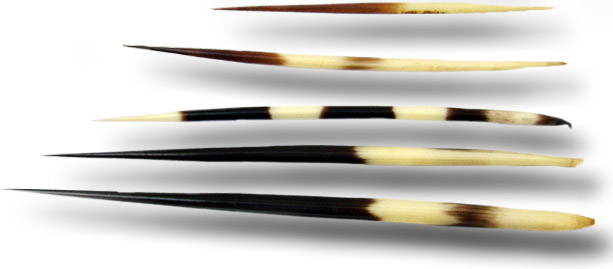
Quills grow in varying lengths and colours, depending on the animal's age and species.

Porcupines' quills, or spines, take on various forms depending on the species, but all are modified hairs coated with thick plates of keratin and are embedded in the skin musculature. Old World porcupines have quills embedded in clusters, whereas in New World porcupines, single quills are interspersed with bristles, underfur, and hair.

Quills are released by contact or may drop out when the porcupine shakes its body. New quills grow to replace lost ones. Despite what is commonly assumed and depicted in media, porcupines cannot launch their quills at range.

Some possible antibiotic properties are within the quills, specifically associated with the free fatty acids coating them. The antibiotic properties are believed to aid a porcupine that has suffered from self-injury.

== Ecology ==
=== Behavior ===
Porcupines are slow-moving animals. All are social to some degree, though only Old World porcupines are known to form clans or family units.

=== Habitat and range ===
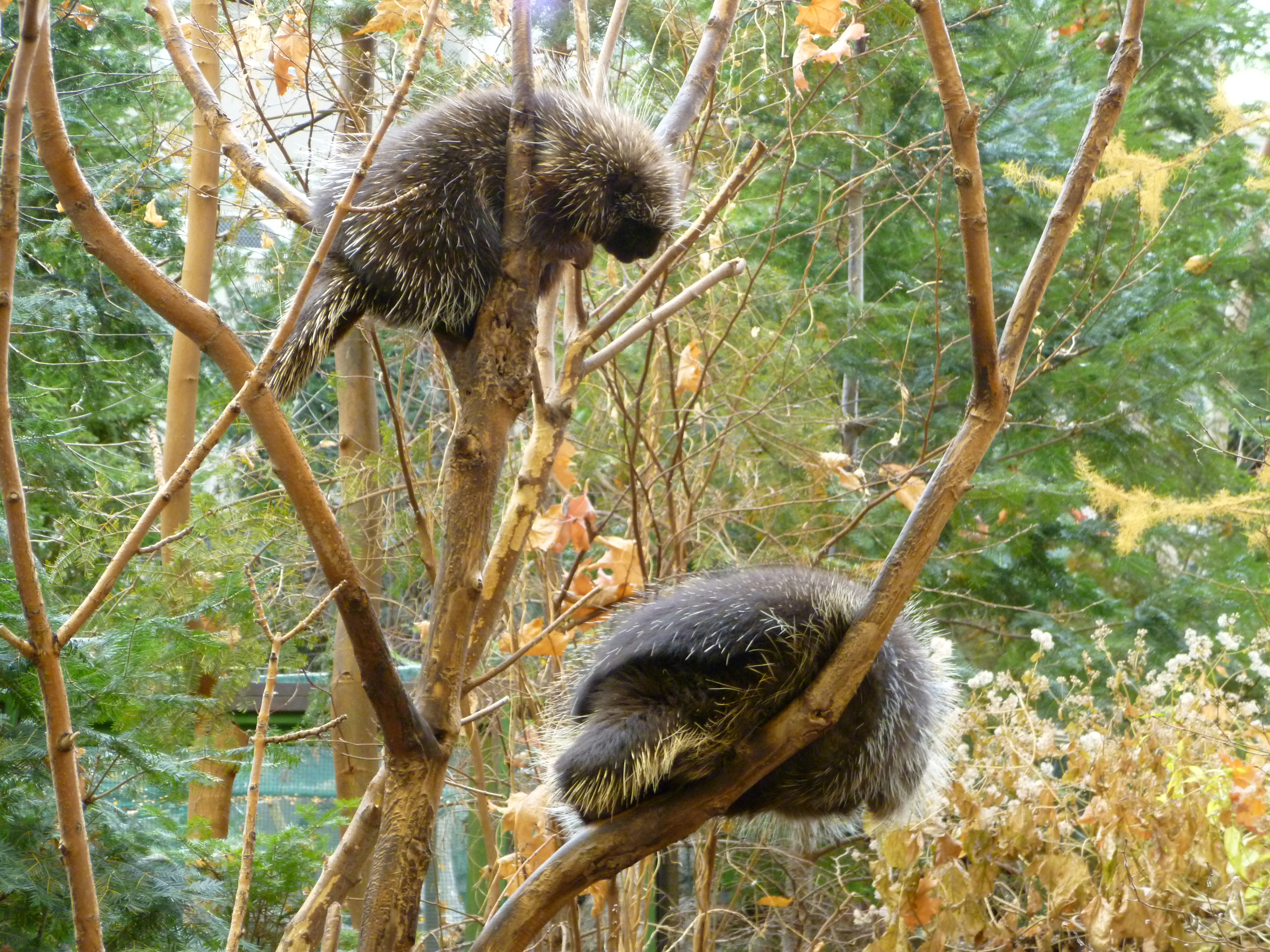
A pair of North American porcupines in their habitat in Quebec

Porcupines occupy a small range of habitats in tropical and temperate parts of Asia, Southern Europe, Africa, and North and South America. They live in forests and deserts, rocky outcrops, and hillsides. Some New World porcupines live in trees, but Old World porcupines prefer a rocky environment. Porcupines can be found on rocky areas up to 3,700 m (12,100 ft) high. They are generally nocturnal, but are occasionally active during daylight.

== Relationships with humans ==
=== Use as food and clothing ===
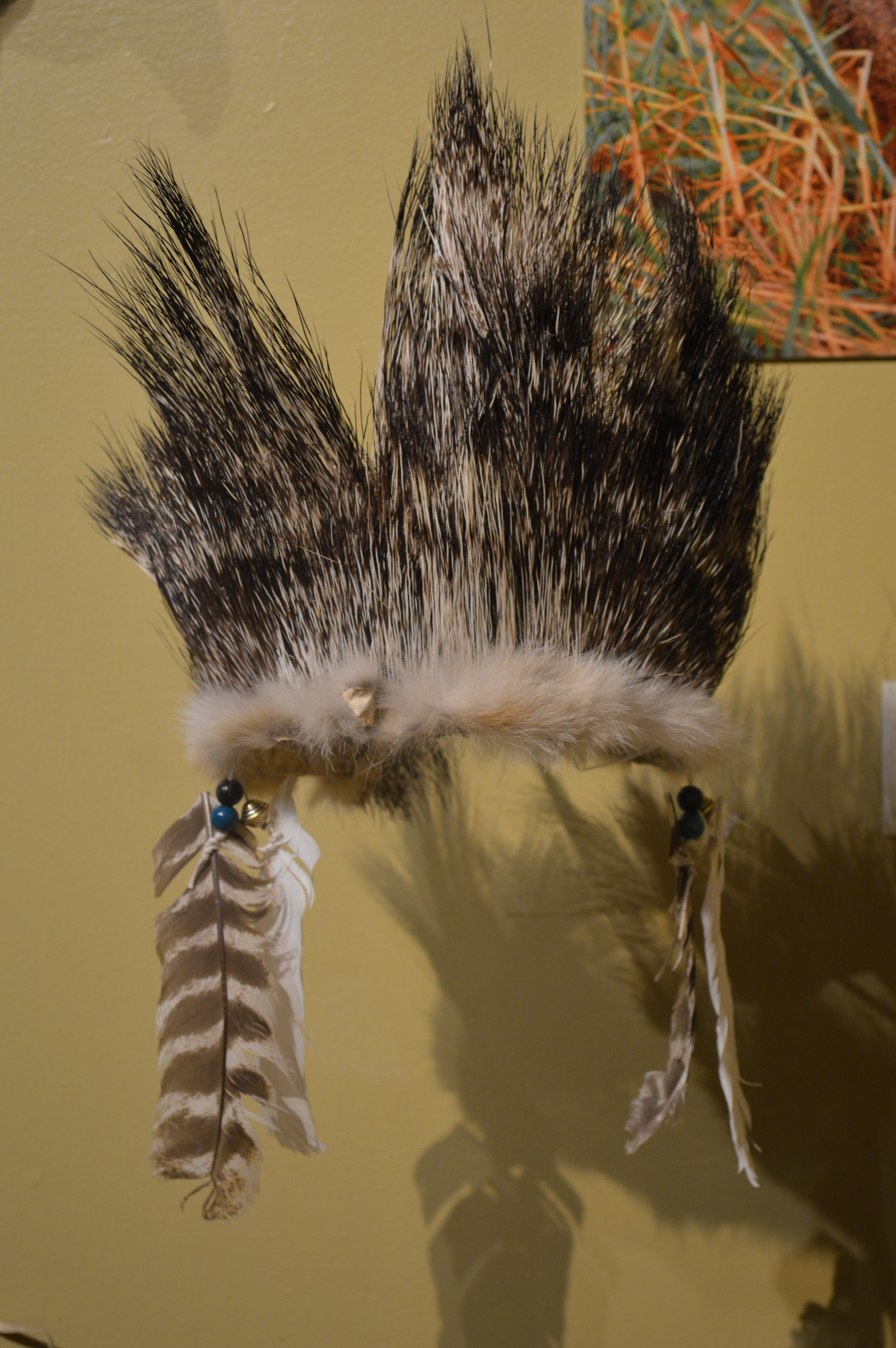
Porcupine guard hair headdress made by native peoples from Sonora displayed at the Museo de Arte Popular in Mexico City

Porcupines are seldom eaten in Western culture, but are eaten often in Southeast Asia, particularly Vietnam, where the prominent use of them as a food source has contributed to declines in their populations. In China, the Chinese porcupine (Hystrix brachyura hodgsoni), a subspecies of the Malayan porcupine, was one of several wild animals that was widely farmed for its meat, but a broad ban on the consumption of many wild animals in 2020 led to stoppage of this practice across the country.

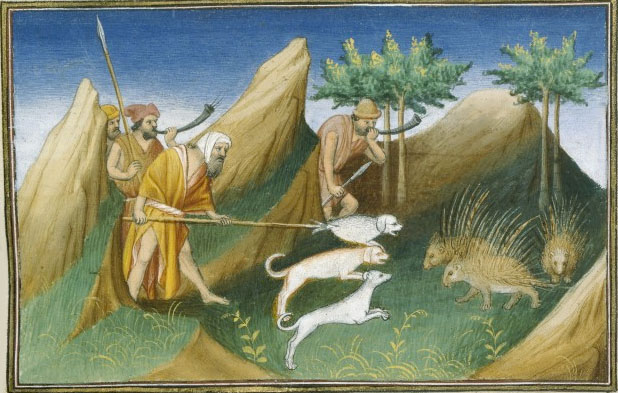
Hunting porcupine near the town of Cassem, in a miniature from The Book of Wonders by Italian explorer Marco Polo (first book, manuscript 2810)

Naturalist William J. Long reported the taste of the North American porcupine as "vile" and "malodorous" and delightful only to a lover of strong cheese.

More commonly, their quills and guard hairs are used for traditional decorative clothing; for example, their guard hairs are used in the creation of the Native American "porky roach" headdress. The main quills may be dyed and then applied in combination with thread to embellish leather accessories, such as knife sheaths and leather bags. Lakota women harvested the quills for quillwork by throwing a blanket over a porcupine and retrieving the quills left stuck in the blanket.

=== Use in research ===
The presence of barbs, acting like anchors, causes increased pain when removing a quill that has pierced the skin. The shape of the barbs makes the quills effective for penetrating the skin and for remaining in place. The quills have inspired research for such applications as the design of hypodermic needles and surgical staples. In contrast to the current design for surgical staples, the porcupine quill and barb design would cause less damage to the skin when removed.

Porcupine quills have been the subject of research due to their composition and ability to withstand compression. Quills are made of alpha-keratin and are filled with a foam core. Structural units that replicate the design of porcupine quills have been created through stereolithogaphy, a 3D printing technique.

=== Domestication ===
Porcupines are sometimes kept as exotic pets. They are also raised in captivity for research purposes and to aid in conservation efforts.

=== In culture ===
Porcupines appear in the mythology of various cultures where the animal is endemic or economically important. It is one of the 28 animals noted as being underdeveloped in some senses in the Bhagavata Purana, classified with other "five-nailed" animals such as the tiger and the tortoise. In San culture, it is grouped alongside animals that have significant reserves of fat or association with honey, such as the hyrax.

As the North American porcupine is widely distributed across the continent, it appears in the mythology of various Native American tribes. In some, such as the Pit River Tribe, they can signify good fortune in hunting. The Arapaho, originally settled in the Red River Valley, made extensive use of quillwork and continued to seek out quills through trade or long expeditions after forced migration to the Great Plains, where porcupines were scarce. They are one of several groups who made use of the North American porcupine for clothing and art, as the practice is recorded from Maine to Alaska.

The porcupine is seen as a pest in some areas due to their salt-seeking behavior. Porcupines seek out any source of sodium to replenish their reserves after consuming significant amounts of plant matter and resort to gnawing on anything that has residues of sodium on or in it, including those from human perspiration. They may chew on tool handles or salt licks, and bite marks are often found in plywood and rubber tires or hoses due to the sodium salts in adhesives used in their manufacture.
