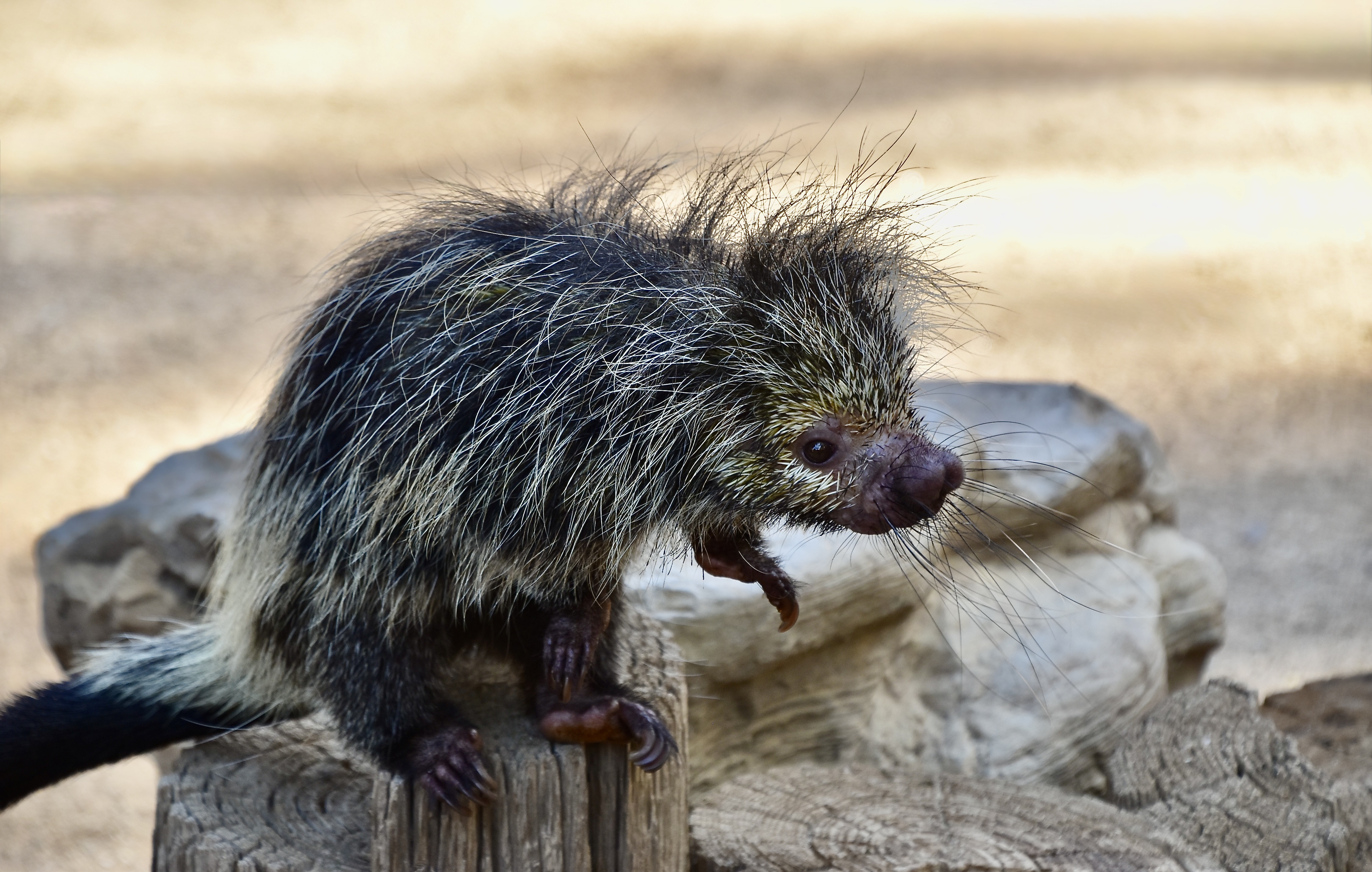

Conservation status
- Least Concern (IUCN 3.1)

Scientific classification
- Kingdom: Animalia
- Phylum: Chordata
- Class: Mammalia
- Order: Rodentia
- Family: Erethizontidae
- Genus: Coendou
- Species: C. melanurus

Binomial name
- Coendou melanurus (Wagner, 1842)

= Black-tailed hairy dwarf porcupine =

Species of rodent

The black-tailed hairy dwarf porcupine (Coendou melanurus) is a porcupine species from the family Erethizontidae. It is found in Brazil, Colombia, Ecuador, French Guiana, Guyana, Suriname and Venezuela.

This species was formerly sometimes assigned to Sphiggurus, a genus no longer recognized since genetic studies showed it to be polyphyletic. Its closest relatives are the frosted hairy dwarf porcupine (Coendou pruinosus), the brown hairy dwarf porcupine (Coendou vestitus) and the streaked dwarf porcupine (Coendou ichillus).
