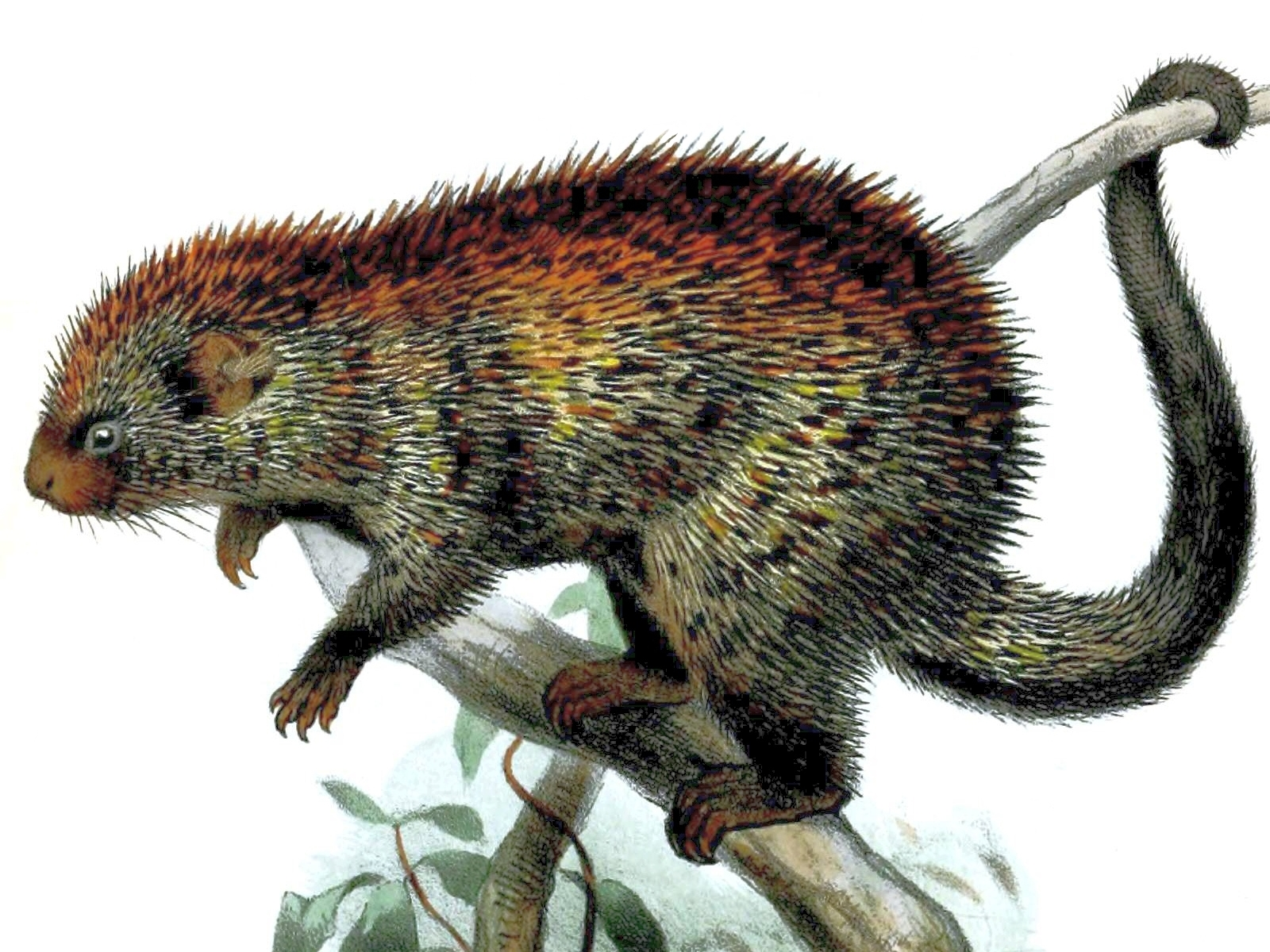

Conservation status
- Least Concern (IUCN 3.1)

Scientific classification
- Kingdom: Animalia
- Phylum: Chordata
- Class: Mammalia
- Order: Rodentia
- Family: Erethizontidae
- Genus: Coendou
- Species: C. spinosus

Binomial name
- Coendou spinosus (F. Cuvier, 1822)

= Paraguaian hairy dwarf porcupine =

Species of rodent

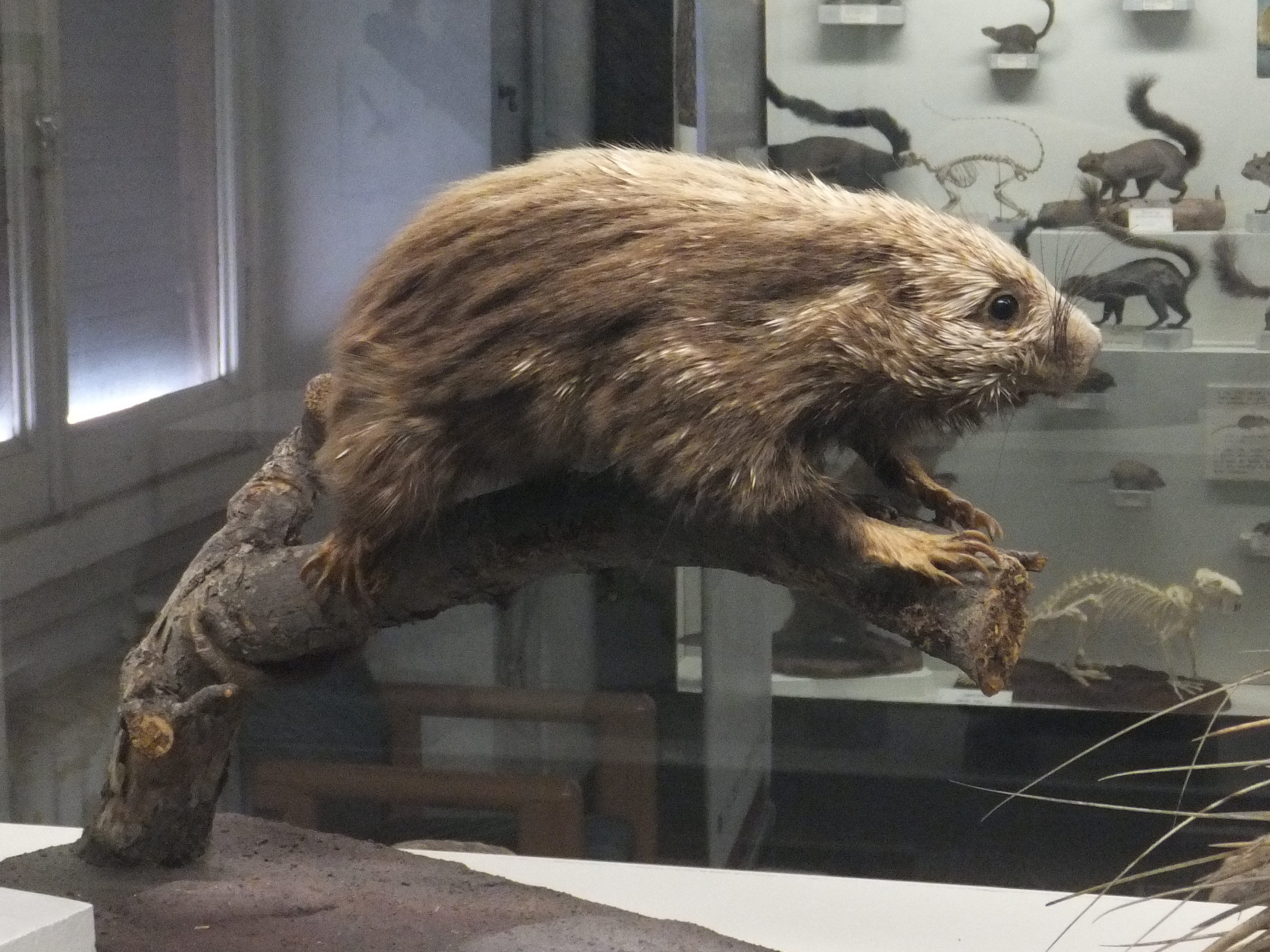
Taxidermized specimen at the Museo Civico di Storia Naturale di Genova

The Paraguaian hairy dwarf porcupine (Coendou spinosus) is a porcupine species from the family Erethizontidae. It is found in Argentina, Brazil, Paraguay and Uruguay.

They have a short tail and gray brown quills and feed on fruits, ant pupae, vegetables and roots.

This species was formerly sometimes assigned to Sphiggurus, a genus no longer recognised since genetic studies showed it to be polyphyletic. The population formerly recognised as the orange-spined hairy dwarf porcupine (Sphiggurus villosus) has been reclassified to this species. Its closest relatives are the bicolored-spined porcupine (Coendou bicolor) and the black dwarf porcupine (Coendou nycthemera).
