= Coendou vossi =

Scientific classification
- Kingdom: Animalia
- Phylum: Chordata
- Class: Mammalia
- Order: Rodentia
- Family: Erethizontidae
- Genus: Coendou
- Species: C. vossi

Binomial name
- Coendou vossi Ramírez-Chávez et al., 2025

Species of mammal endemic to Colombia

Coendou vossi, commonly known as Voss' porcupine, is a small porcupine of the Coendou genus endemic to Colombia.

== Distribution ==
Specimens of Coendou vossi can be found in the humid and dry forests of the Magdalena River Valley. It inhabits dry areas of the departments of Caldas, Cesar, Cundinamarca, Santander, Sucre and Tolima.

== Description ==
Unlike C. quichua and C. rothschildi, to which it is closely related, C. vossi is smaller, measuring between 26 and 33 cm (10 and 13 in). Its tail is more elongated, covering 70% of its body, facilitating arboreal behaviour. The barbs of C. vossi are bicoloured or tricoloured, being lighter at the base, measuring 27 to 55 mm (1.1 to 2.2 in). On the face they measure 5 to 10 mm (0.2 to 0.4 in).

The back has a sparse dark brown coat, darker than the other species with which it has been confused in the past. Its skull is less elongated.

== See also ==
- List of living mammal species described in the 2020s
