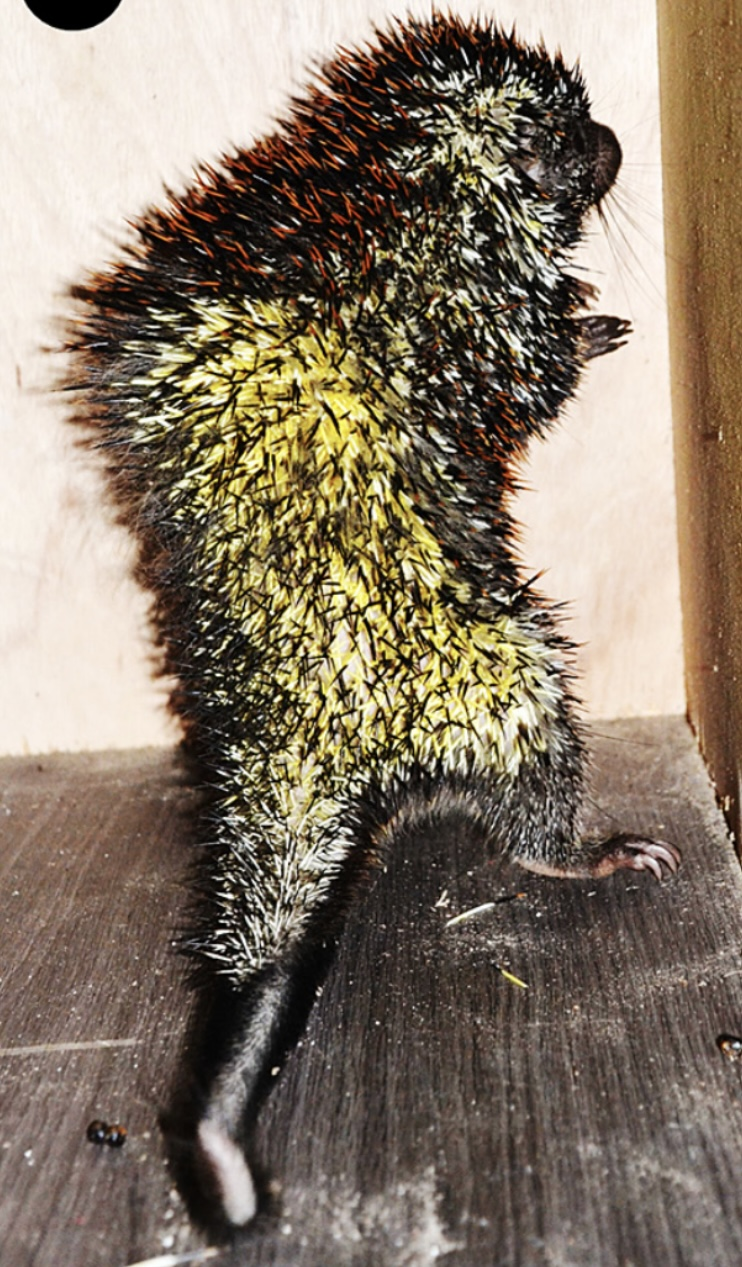

Conservation status
- Endangered (IUCN 3.1)

Scientific classification
- Kingdom: Animalia
- Phylum: Chordata
- Class: Mammalia
- Order: Rodentia
- Family: Erethizontidae
- Genus: Coendou
- Species: C. speratus

Binomial name
- Coendou speratus Pontes, Gadelha, Melo, de Sá, Loss Junior, Costa & Leite, 2013

= Coendou speratus =

Species of mammal

Coendou speratus, known locally as coandumirim and commonly as the dwarf porcupine, is small porcupine of the Coendou genus found in northeastern Brazil. This small porcupine has a long tail and a spiny appearance as its dorsal fur is not long. Its dorsal colouring is blackish which contrasts with the brownish tips of its quills. It is distinguished from Coendou nycthemera by its tricolored quills whereas nycthemera is bicoloured.

Originally found in the Pernambuco Centre of Endemism in 2013, it was later discovered also at Murici Ecological Station and later at Garanhuns as well.
