= Streaked dwarf porcupine =

Conservation status
- Data Deficient (IUCN 3.1)

Scientific classification
- Kingdom: Animalia
- Phylum: Chordata
- Class: Mammalia
- Order: Rodentia
- Family: Erethizontidae
- Genus: Coendou
- Species: C. ichillus

Binomial name
- Coendou ichillus Voss & da Silva, 2001
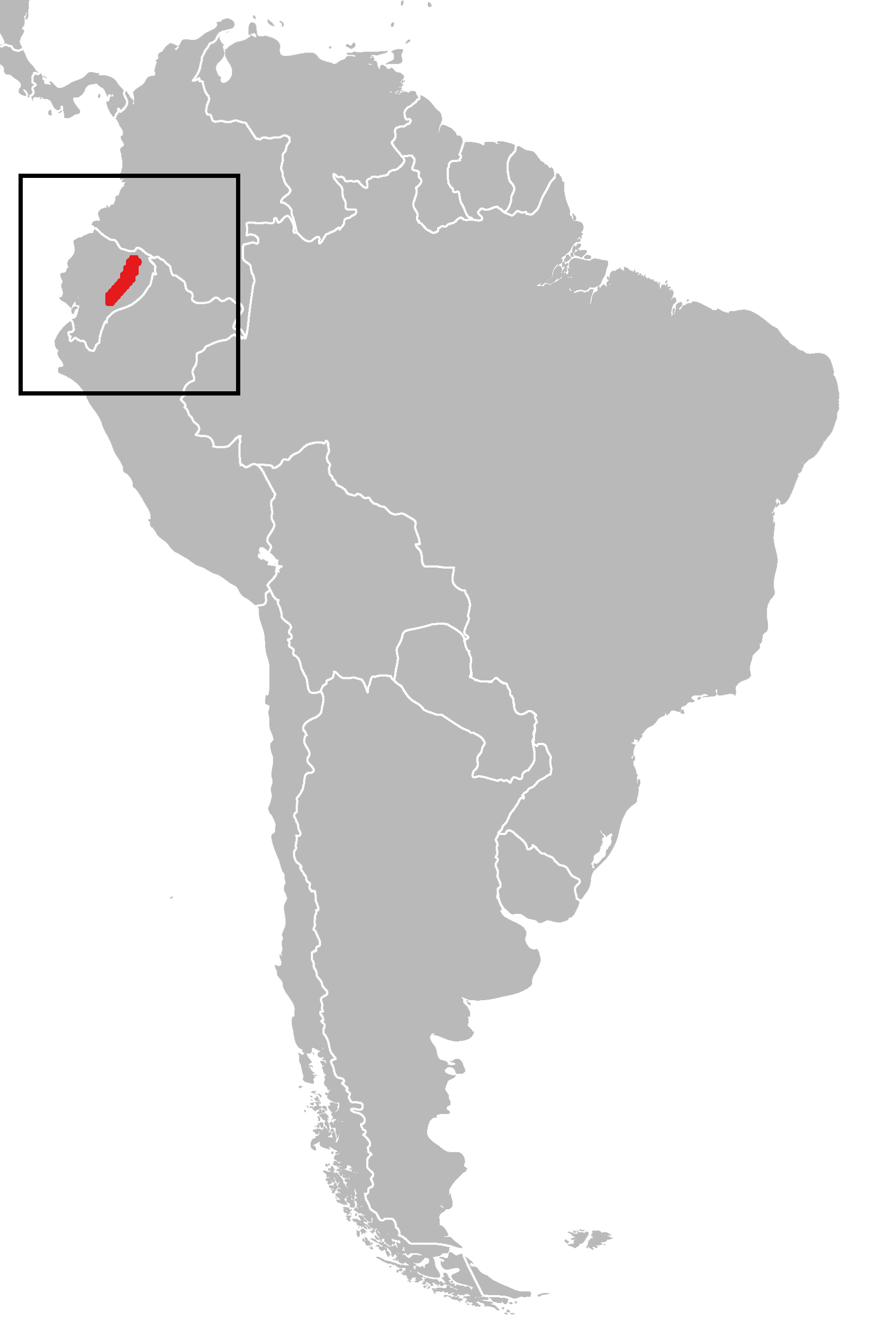
- Range of C. ichillus

Species of rodent

The streaked dwarf porcupine (Coendou ichillus) is a porcupine species in the family Erethizontidae. It is known from the lowlands (below an altitude of 400 m) of eastern Ecuador, and may be present in Peru as well. It appears to be nocturnal and arboreal in its habits.

This species was formerly sometimes assigned to Sphiggurus, a genus no longer recognized since genetic studies showed it to be polyphyletic. Its closest relatives are the frosted hairy dwarf porcupine (Coendou pruinosus) and the brown hairy dwarf porcupine (Coendou vestitus).
