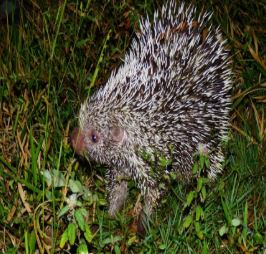

Scientific classification
- Kingdom: Animalia
- Phylum: Chordata
- Class: Mammalia
- Order: Rodentia
- Family: Erethizontidae
- Genus: Coendou
- Species: C. sanctamartae

Binomial name
- Coendou sanctamartae Allen, 1904

= Santa Marta porcupine =

Species of rodent

The Santa Marta porcupine (Coendou sanctamartae) is a rodent in the family Erethizontidae. It is known from dry forests on the lower slopes of the Sierra Nevada de Santa Marta and Serranía del Perijá mountains of northern Colombia, at altitudes below 500 and 1,100 m (1,600 and 3,600 ft), respectively, and intervening lowlands, and may also be present in nearby parts of Venezuela. It has been described as a subspecies of C. prehensilis, although the latter may be a species complex. Its karyotype has 2n = 74, FN = 82.
