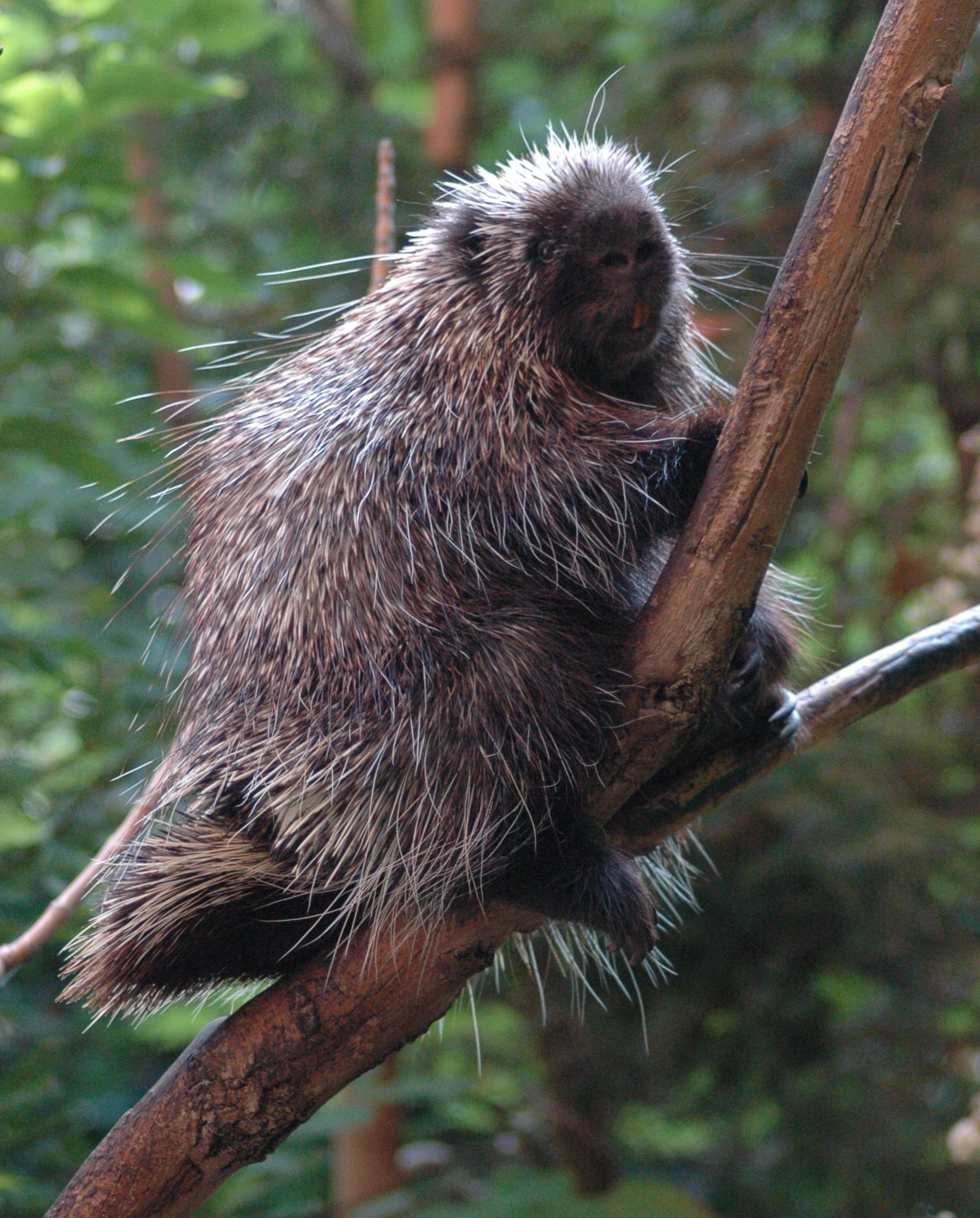
- North American porcupine (Erethizon dorsatum)

Scientific classification
- Domain: Eukaryota
- Kingdom: Animalia
- Phylum: Chordata
- Class: Mammalia
- Order: Rodentia
- Family: Erethizontidae
- Subfamily: Erethizontinae; Bonaparte, 1845

Genera
- Coendou; Erethizon

= Erethizontinae =

Subfamily of rodents

Erethizontinae is a subfamily of the New World porcupine family Erethizontidae, and includes all species of the family with the exception of the bristle-spined rat, Chaetomys subspinosus, which is classified in its own subfamily, Chaetomyinae.
