= Roosmalen's dwarf porcupine =

Conservation status
- Data Deficient (IUCN 3.1)

Scientific classification
- Kingdom: Animalia
- Phylum: Chordata
- Class: Mammalia
- Order: Rodentia
- Family: Erethizontidae
- Genus: Coendou
- Species: C. roosmalenorum

Binomial name
- Coendou roosmalenorum Voss & da Silva, 2001
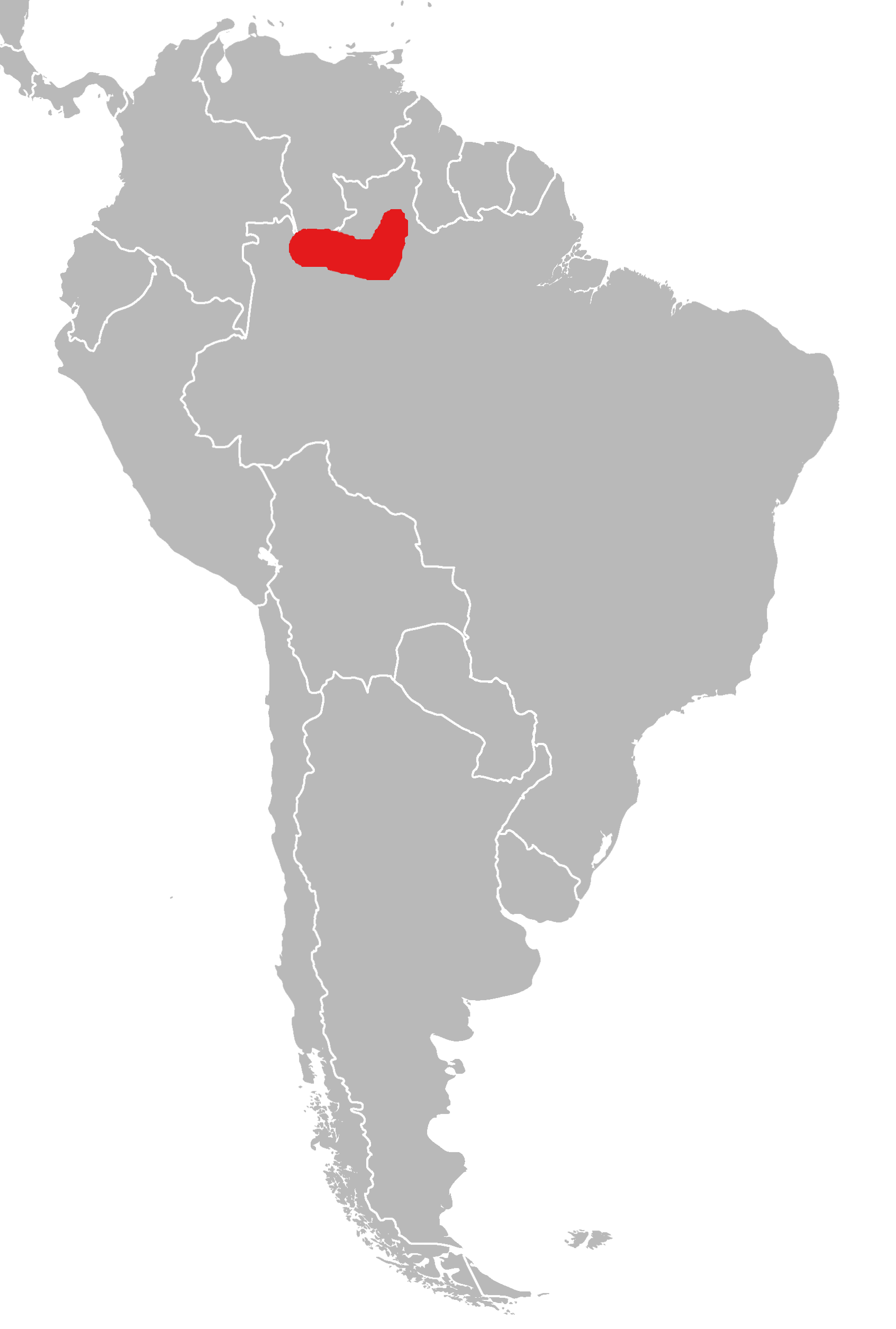

Synonyms
- Sphiggurus roosmalenorus (Voss & da Silva, 2001)

Species of rodent

Roosmalen's dwarf porcupine (Coendou roosmalenorum) is a porcupine species from the New World porcupine family likely endemic to northern Brazil. Only three specimens were known at the time, and only one had a collection locality. It is named for Marc van Roosmalen and his son Tomas, whose collections from the middle Madeira included the first known specimens. It was soon assigned to the genus Sphiggurus, although this genus was not recognized by the authors. Genetic studies in 2013 have since showed Sphiggurus to be polyphyletic (this taxon was omitted from the study). Nonetheless, it is commonly classified as Sphiggurus roosmalenorum. Coendou roosmalenorum may be misspelled due to a conflicting basionym combination.
