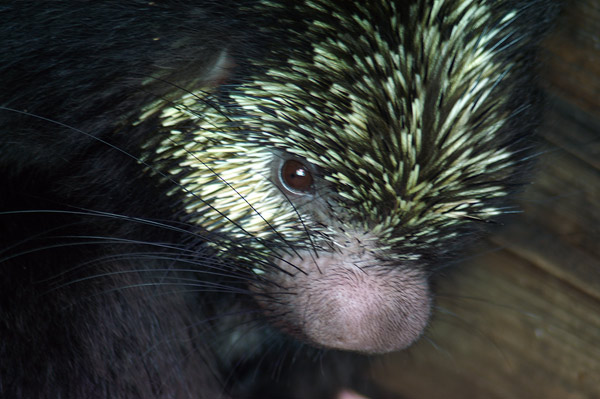

Conservation status
- Least Concern (IUCN 3.1)

Scientific classification
- Kingdom: Animalia
- Phylum: Chordata
- Class: Mammalia
- Infraclass: Placentalia
- Order: Rodentia
- Family: Erethizontidae
- Genus: Coendou
- Species: C. mexicanus

Binomial name
- Coendou mexicanus (Kerr, 1792)

= Mexican hairy dwarf porcupine =

Species of rodent

The Mexican hairy dwarf porcupine or Mexican tree porcupine (Coendou mexicanus) is a species of rodent in the family Erethizontidae. It is found in Costa Rica, El Salvador, Guatemala, Honduras, Panama, Mexico, Nicaragua and Belize.

This species was formerly sometimes assigned to Sphiggurus, a genus no longer recognized since genetic studies showed it to be polyphyletic. Its closest relatives are the Andean porcupine (Coendou quichua) and the stump-tailed porcupine (Coendou rufescens).

== Description ==
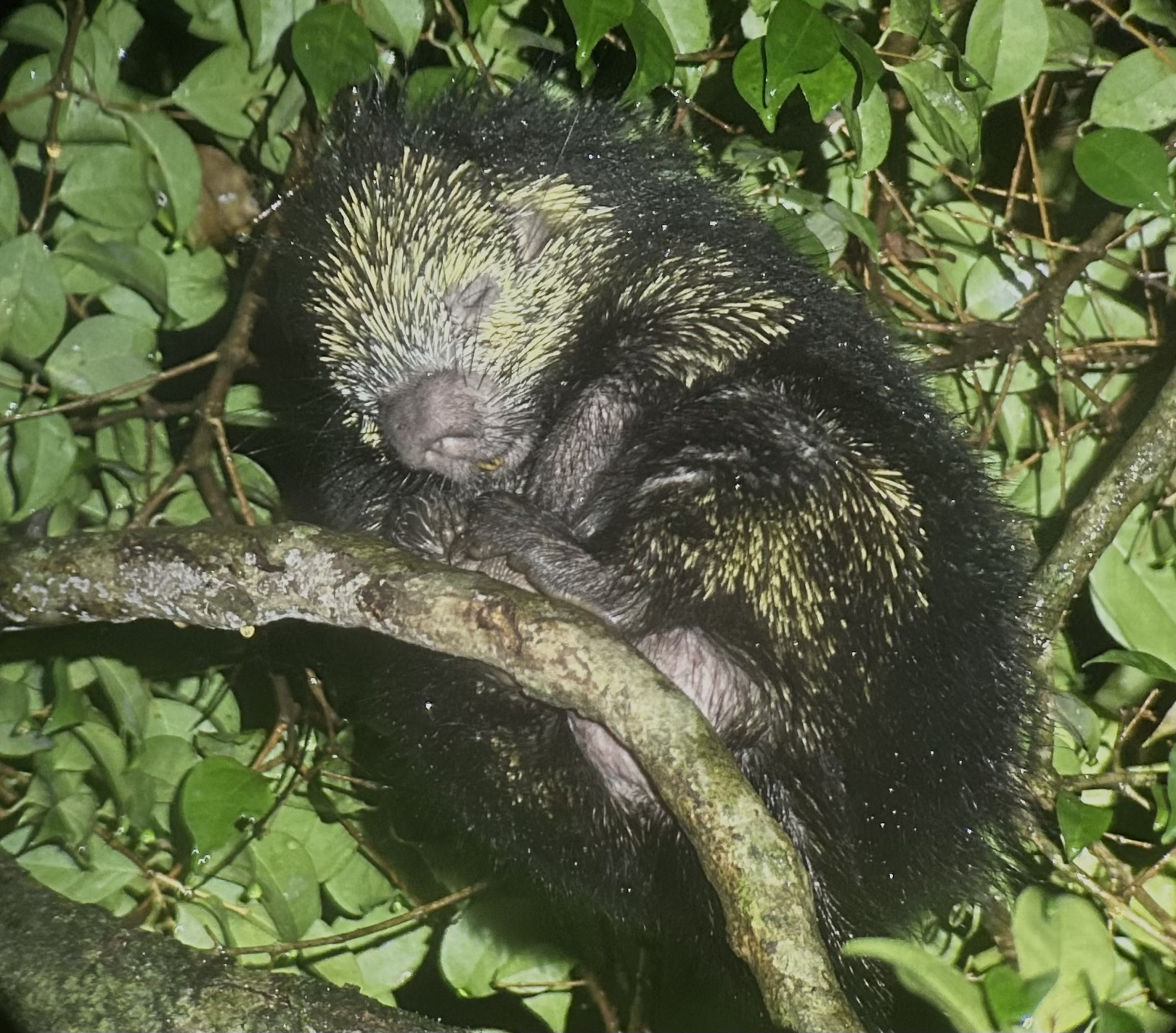
A Mexican hairy dwarf porcupine sleeping in tree in Costa Rica

This porcupine has a pale head and a dark-coloured body. The head-and-body length ranges between about 320 and 457 mm (12.6 and 18.0 in), with a tail ranging from 200 to 358 mm (8 to 14 in). The maximum weight is about 2.6 kg (6 lb). This porcupine is covered with short yellowish spines but these are almost entirely obscured by the long black hair on the body. Sometimes the spines on the shoulders and back are visible projecting through the hairs. By contrast, the head is hairless, revealing the yellowish spines. The snout is pink, broad and bulbous, and the eyes are small. The tail is prehensile, spiny and broad at the base, tapering to a point. This porcupine differs from Rothschild's porcupine (Coendou rothschildi) in that Rothschild's is more obviously spiny and lacks the hairy coat.

== Ecology ==
An arboreal species, it uses its prehensile tail to hold onto branches. It is nocturnal and is usually more active on dark nights. The day is spent in a hollow tree, concealed on a leafy branch, or in highland areas, in a clump of bamboos. As it uses the same hiding place each day, a pile of droppings accumulates which produces a strong odour. The diet consists of buds, young leaves, fruits and seeds. It particularly favours fruiting trees such as Inga, Cecropia, Ficus and Brosimum. Individuals normally live alone and are silent, but in the breeding season it is more vocal, emitting screams and yowls. The female usually bears a single offspring.
