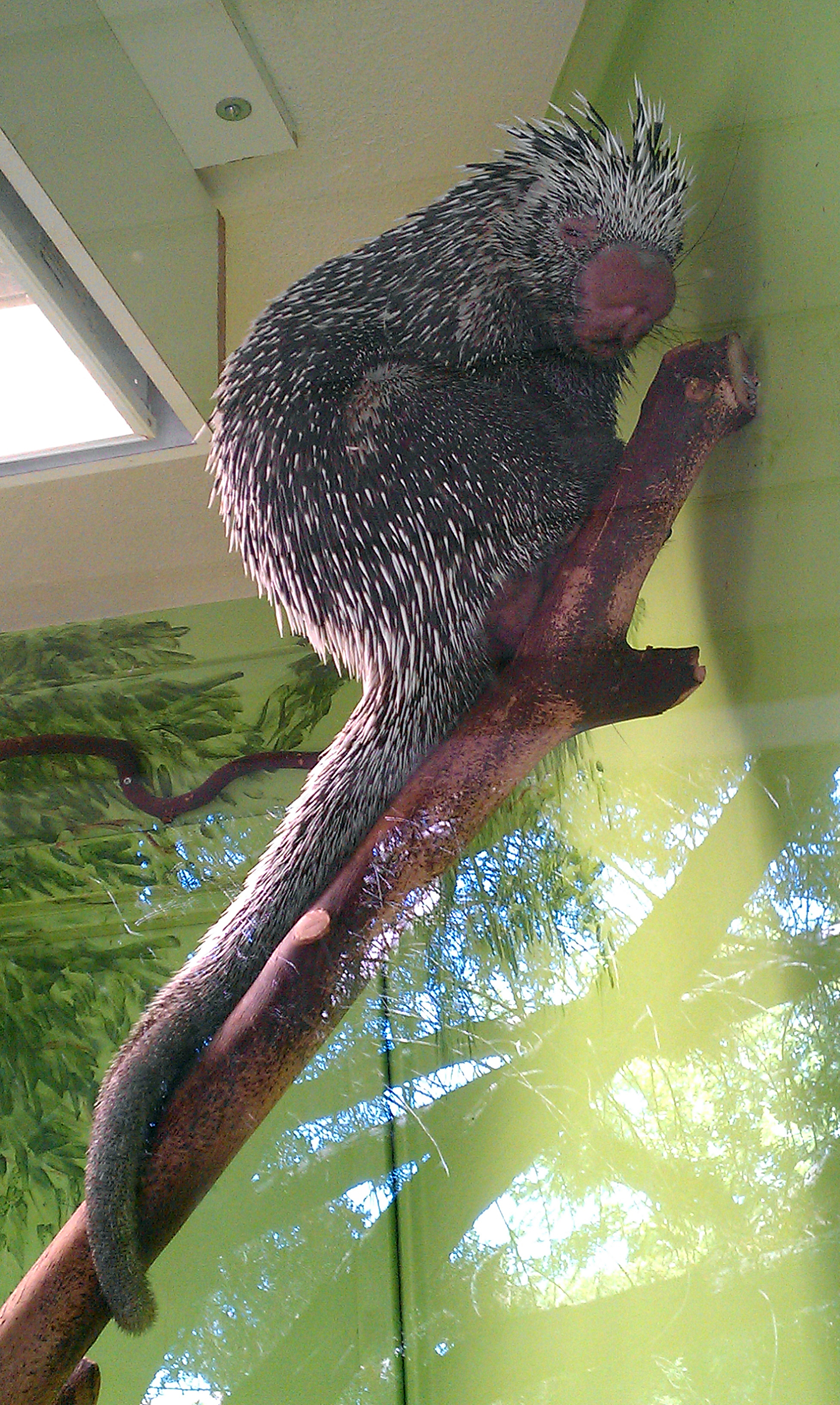
- Coendou prehensilis

Scientific classification
- Kingdom: Animalia
- Phylum: Chordata
- Class: Mammalia
- Order: Rodentia
- Family: Erethizontidae
- Subfamily: Erethizontinae
- Genus: Coendou; Lacépède, 1799

Type species
- Coendou prehensilis (as Hystrix prehensilis) (Linnaeus, 1758)

Species
- See text
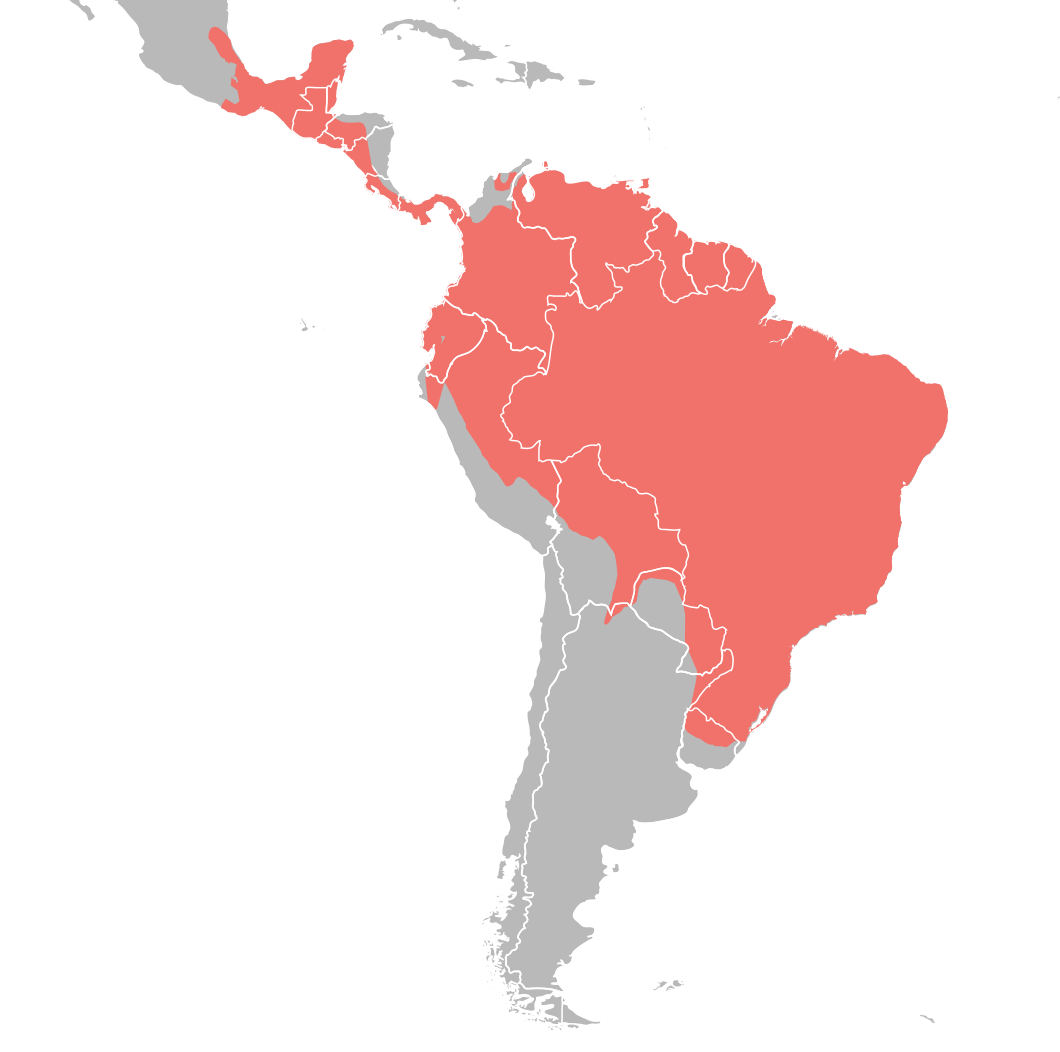
- Coendou distribution

= Prehensile-tailed porcupine =

Prehensile-tailed porcupines Temporal range: Early Pleistocene to Recent

Genus of rodents

The prehensile-tailed porcupines or coendous (genus Coendou) are found in Central and South America. Two other formerly recognized Neotropical tree porcupine genera, Echinoprocta and Sphiggurus, have been subsumed into Coendou, since Sphiggurus was shown by genetic studies to be polyphyletic, while Echinoprocta nested within Coendou.

== Characteristics ==
Among the most notable features of Coendou porcupines are their unspined prehensile tails. The front and hind feet are also modified for grasping. These limbs all contribute to making this animal an adept climber, an adaptation to living most of their lives in trees.

They feed on leaves, shoots, fruits, bark, roots, and buds. They can be pests of plantation crops. They also make a distinctive "baby-like" sound to communicate in the wild.

Their young are born with soft hair that hardens to quills with age. Adults are slow-moving and will roll into a ball when threatened and on the ground. The record longevity is 27 years.

== Species ==
- Genus Coendou – prehensile-tailed porcupines
  - Baturite porcupine – C. baturitensis
  - Bicolored-spined porcupine – C. bicolor
  - Streaked dwarf porcupine – C. ichillus
  - Bahia porcupine – C. insidiosus
  - Black-tailed hairy dwarf porcupine – C. melanurus
  - Mexican hairy dwarf porcupine – C. mexicanus
  - Black dwarf porcupine – C. nycthemera
  - Amazonian long-tailed porcupine – C. longicaudatus
  - Brazilian porcupine – C. prehensilis
  - Frosted hairy dwarf porcupine – C. pruinosus
  - Andean porcupine – C. quichua
  - Roosmalen's dwarf porcupine – C. roosmalenorum
  - Stump-tailed porcupine – C. rufescens
  - Santa Marta porcupine – C. sanctamartae
  - Dwarf porcupine – C. speratus
  - Paraguaian hairy dwarf porcupine – C. spinosus
  - Brown hairy dwarf porcupine – C. vestitus
  - Voss' porcupine – C. vossi
