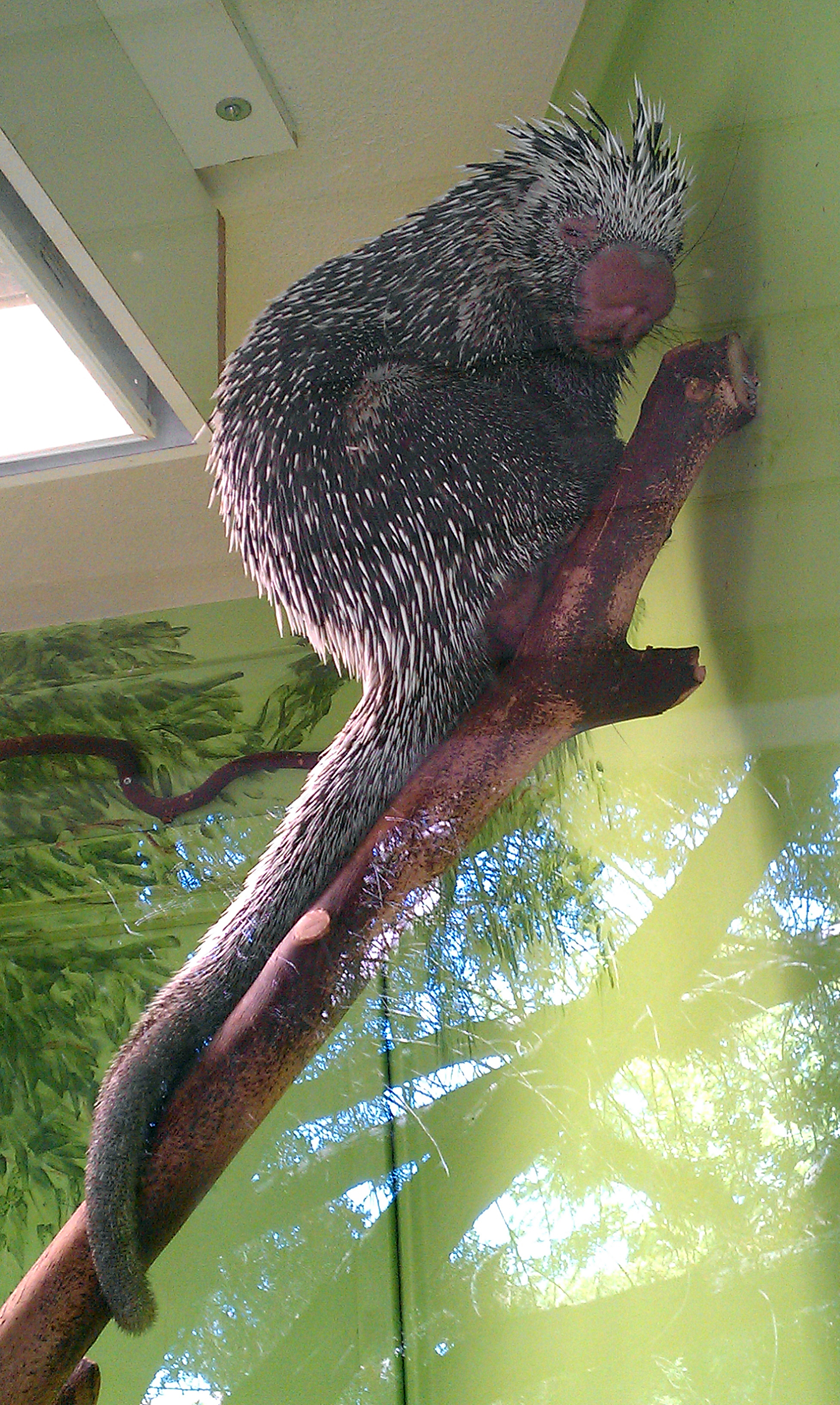

Conservation status
- Least Concern (IUCN 3.1)

Scientific classification
- Kingdom: Animalia
- Phylum: Chordata
- Class: Mammalia
- Order: Rodentia
- Family: Erethizontidae
- Genus: Coendou
- Species: C. prehensilis

Binomial name
- Coendou prehensilis (Linnaeus, 1758)
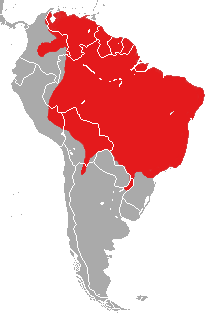
- Brazilian porcupine distribution

Synonyms
- Hystrix prehensilis Linnaeus, 1758

= Brazilian porcupine =

Species of rodent

The Brazilian porcupine (Coendou prehensilis) is a porcupine found in Brazil, Argentina, Uruguay, Colombia, Venezuela, Guyana, French Guiana, Peru, Paraguay, Suriname, Bolivia and Trinidad, with a single record from Ecuador. It inhabits tropical forests at elevations up to 1,500 m (4,900 ft).

== Description ==
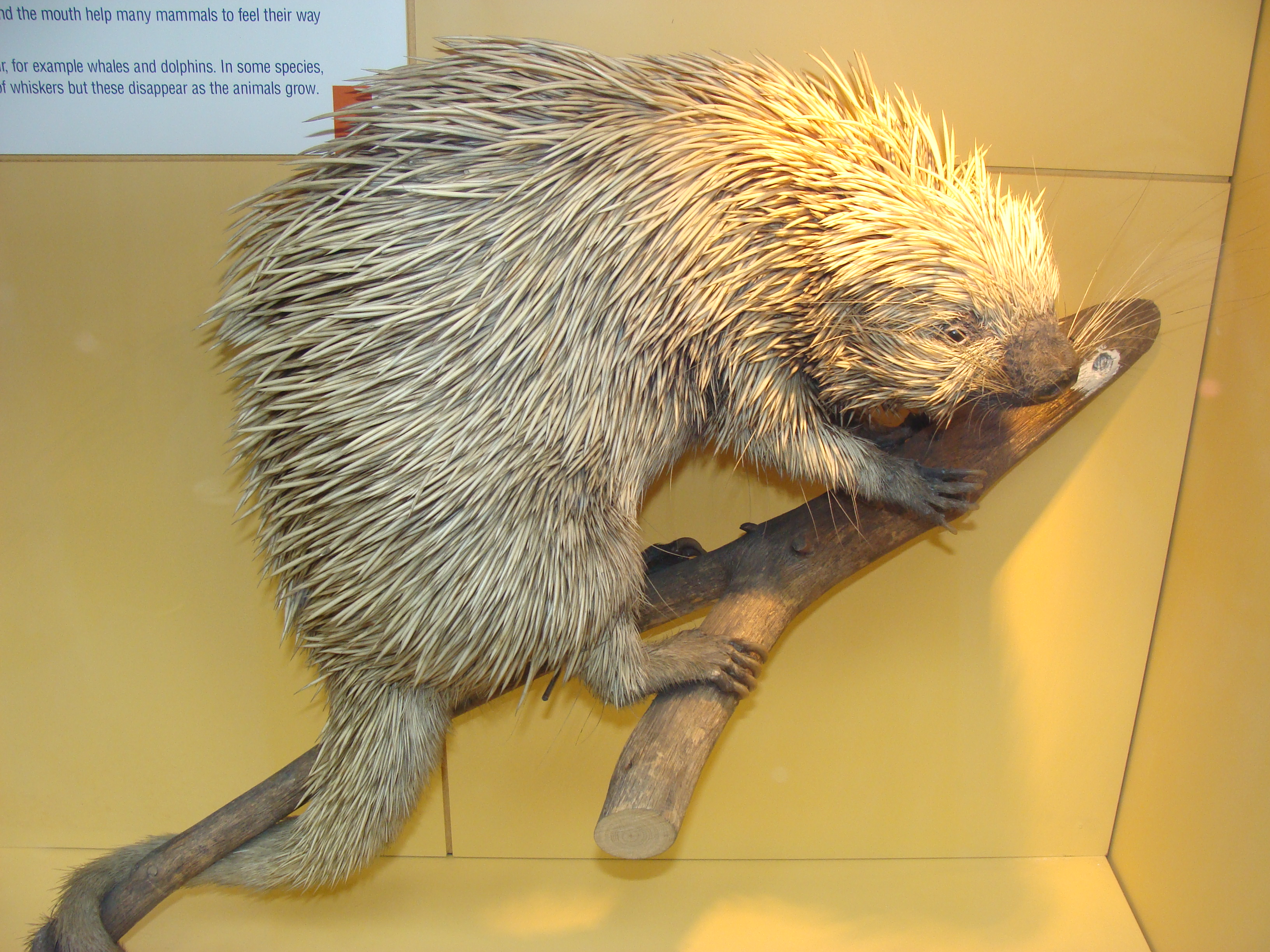
Stuffed specimen at the Natural History Museum of London

The body is covered with short, thick spines that are whitish or yellowish in color, mixed with the darker hair, while the underside is grayish. The lips and nose are fleshy. The tail is prehensile, with the tip curling upward so as to get a better grip on tree branches. This porcupine can grow to forty inches long (1 m), but half of that is tail. It weighs about nine pounds (4.1 kg). No spines are found on the tail, which is long (330–485 mm (13.0–19.1 in)). Its feet are reflective of their arboreal lifestyle, well-adapted for gripping branches, with four long-clawed toes on each.

== Behavior ==
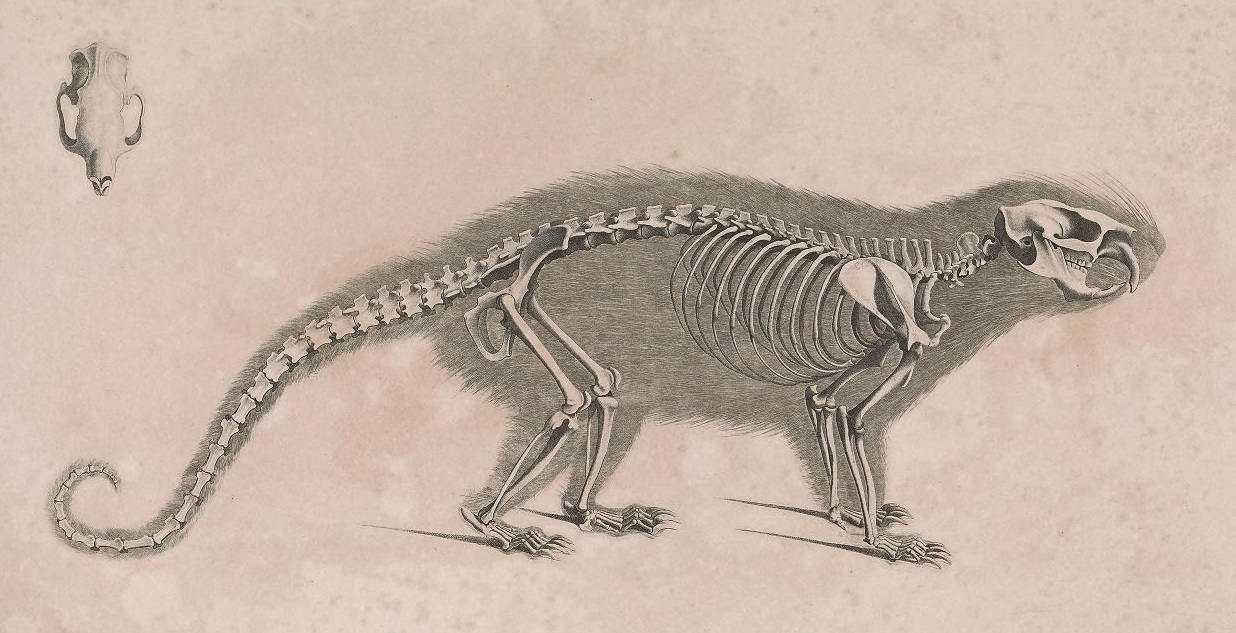
Skeleton

This shy, nocturnal porcupine is solitary or lives in pairs in the branches of trees. During the day it rests in a cavity in a hollow tree or in a well-shaded area of the canopy, 6 to 10 meters (20 to 33 ft) above the ground. It rarely descends to the ground, but it shows little fear if it happens to be caught. It is not aggressive but will defend itself ferociously if attacked. Its diet consists of leaves, fruit, small fresh twigs and shoots, seeds, roots, flowers, stems, bark and cambium layer of some trees, buds and agricultural crops like corn and bananas. This creature can easily be tamed enough to be kept in captivity. Intra-specific interactions consist of biting and attempts to injure adversaries with their sharp quills. When excited, porcupines stamp their hind feet. Vocalizations consist of growls and cries. If caught, the porcupine rolls into a ball. The prehensile tail is used to curl around branches when climbing.

== Reproduction ==
As a rule the female gives birth to a single young one in the spring. The newborn porcupine is covered with red hairs and small spines, which harden shortly after birth.
