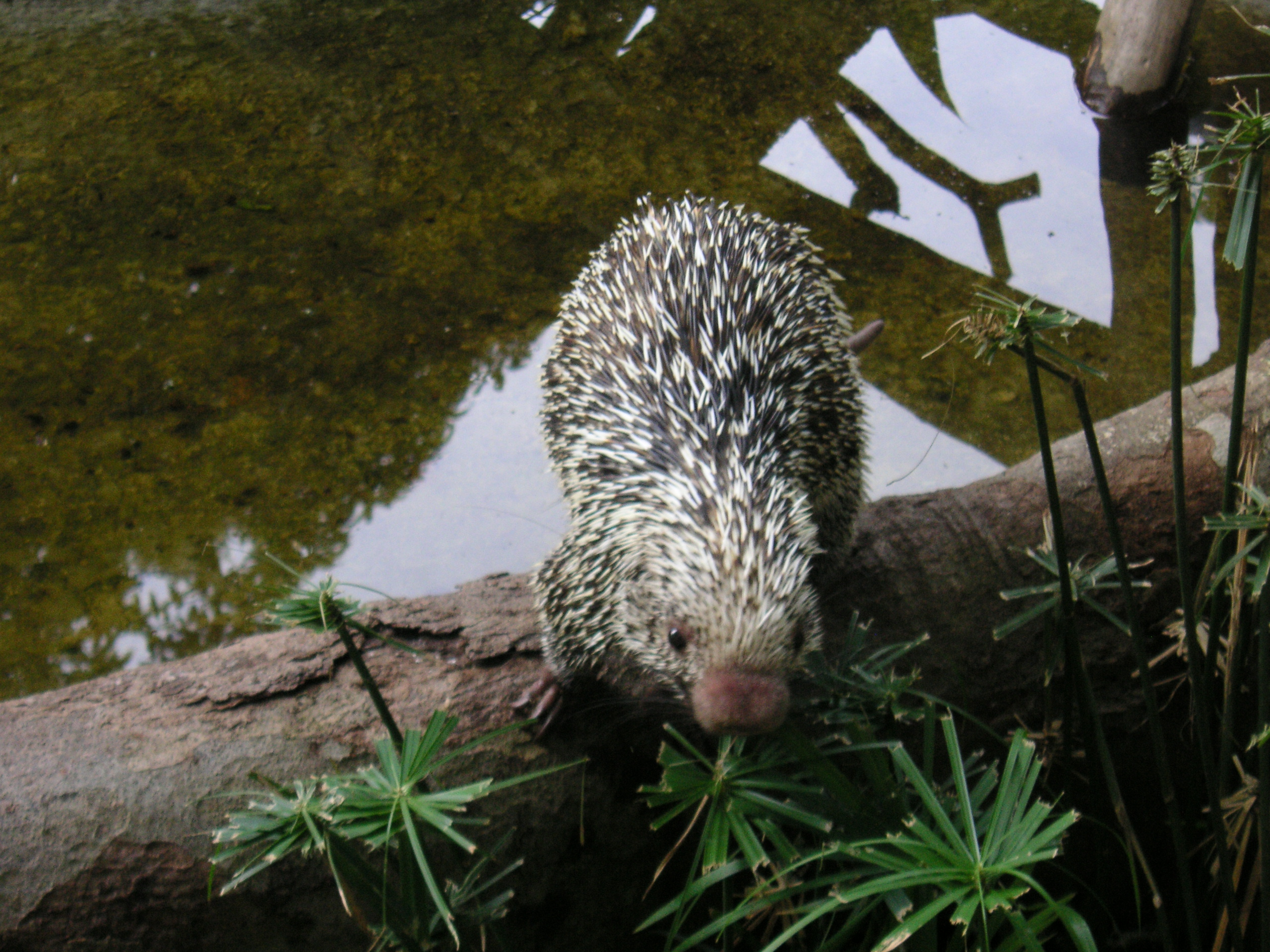

Conservation status
- Data Deficient (IUCN 3.1)

Scientific classification
- Kingdom: Animalia
- Phylum: Chordata
- Class: Mammalia
- Order: Rodentia
- Family: Erethizontidae
- Genus: Coendou
- Species: C. quichua

Binomial name
- Coendou quichua Thomas, 1899
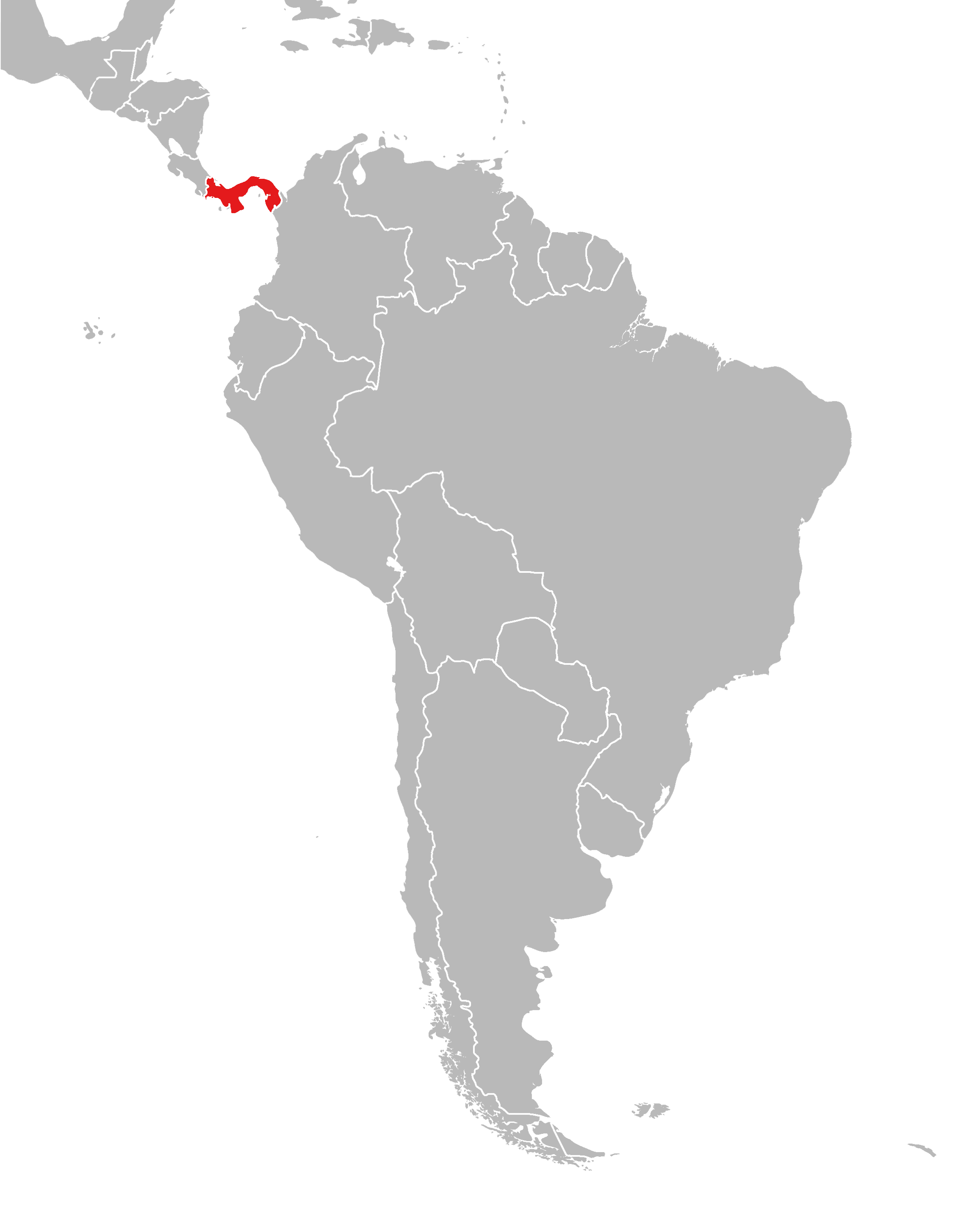
- Range in Panama

Synonyms
- Coendou rothschildi (Thomas, 1902)

= Andean porcupine =

Species of rodent

The Andean porcupine (Coendou quichua) or Quichua porcupine is a species of rodent in the family Erethizontidae. It is found in the Andes of northern Ecuador and Colombia as well as in Panama. This porcupine is little known, but is probably arboreal, nocturnal and solitary like its relatives. The species is thought to be uncommon to rare and the population decreasing. It is threatened by deforestation, habitat fragmentation and agriculture.

== Taxonomy ==
Although it is morphologically distinctive, it has sometimes been described as a subspecies of the bicolored-spined porcupine (C. bicolor). However, genetic studies have shown it to be closest to the stump-tailed porcupine (C. rufescens). Rothschild's porcupine (C. rothschildi) of Panama was formerly considered a distinct species, but phylogenetic evidence indicates that both are synonymous.

== Description ==
The Andean porcupine is a medium-sized porcupine with a head-and-body length of between 332 and 420 mm (13.1 and 16.5 in) and a tail length of between 290 and 413 mm (11.4 and 16.3 in). A fully grown adult weighs in the region of 2 kg (4 lb). The nose is pink and large, and the eyes are small. The body is spiny all over, the evenly spaced spines being dark with yellowish tips in the animal's mid section. The tail tapers from a broad base and is prehensile. This porcupine could be confused with the Mexican hairy dwarf porcupine (Sphiggurus mexicanus), but that species has long black hair which largely conceals the spines while the Andean is more obviously spiny.

== Ecology ==
The ecology of this species is little known. Its behaviour is likely to resemble that of its close relatives in being nocturnal and arboreal, and feeding on fruit and leaves.

== Status ==
The Andean porcupine is listed by the International Union for Conservation of Nature as "data deficient". This is because of its uncertain taxonomic status as well as the lack of recent information on its abundance, the threats it faces and its needs. It is generally an uncommon or rare species and it is suspected that its population is decreasing, due to degradation and fragmentation of its habitat as the forest is felled for conversion to agricultural use.
