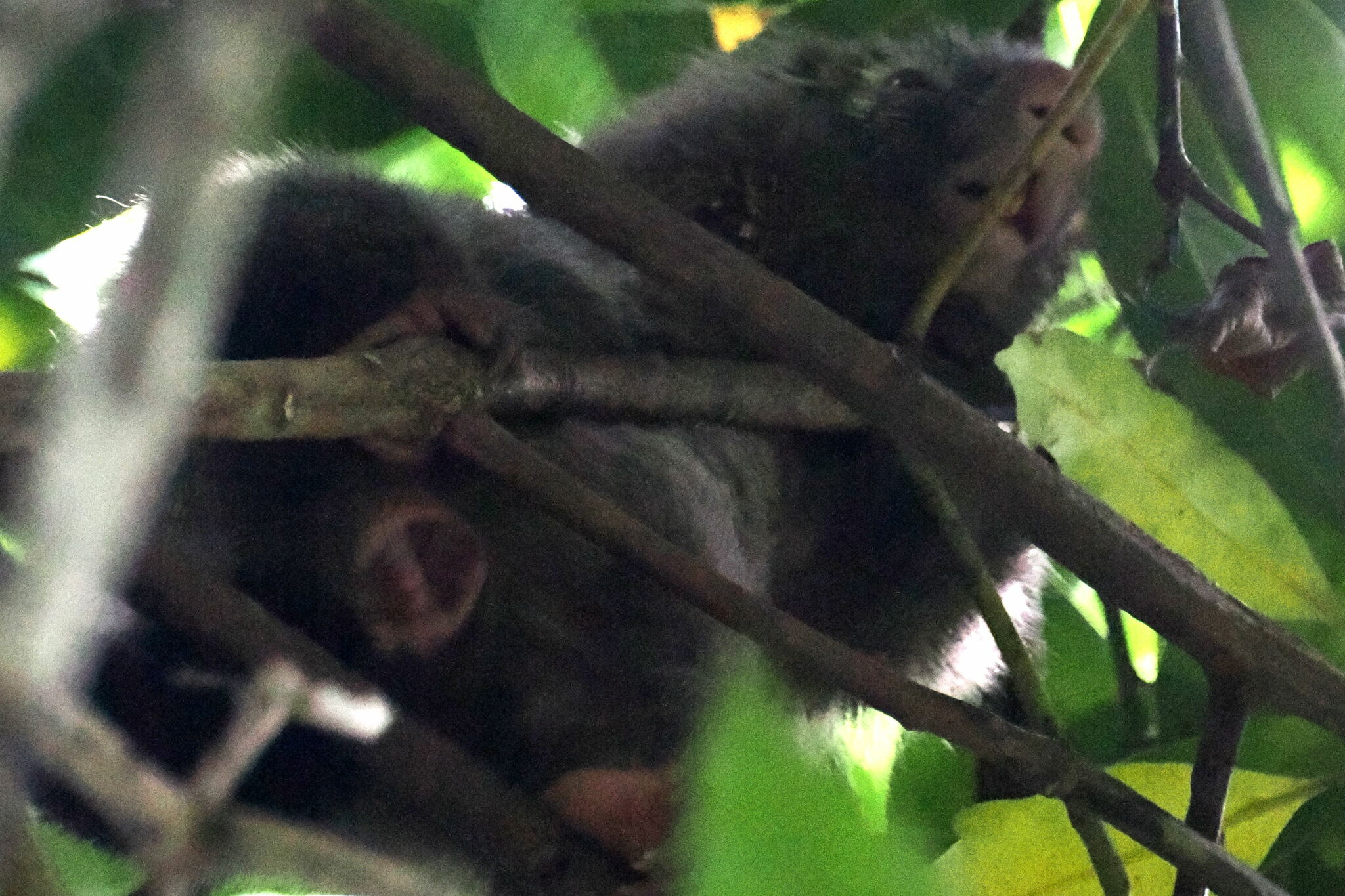

Conservation status
- Least Concern (IUCN 3.1)

Scientific classification
- Kingdom: Animalia
- Phylum: Chordata
- Class: Mammalia
- Order: Rodentia
- Family: Erethizontidae
- Genus: Coendou
- Species: C. insidiosus

Binomial name
- Coendou insidiosus (Olfers, 1818)

= Bahia porcupine =

Species of rodent

The Bahia porcupine (Coendou insidiosus), is a New World porcupine species in the family Erethizontidae endemic to the Atlantic Forest of southeastern Brazil. It was formerly sometimes assigned to Sphiggurus, a genus no longer recognized since genetic studies showed it to be polyphyletic. Sphiggurus pallidus, formerly considered a separate species but known from two young specimens only, is a synonym of this species.

== Predation ==
Bahia porcupines are eaten by birds of prey, cats, snakes, and humans.
