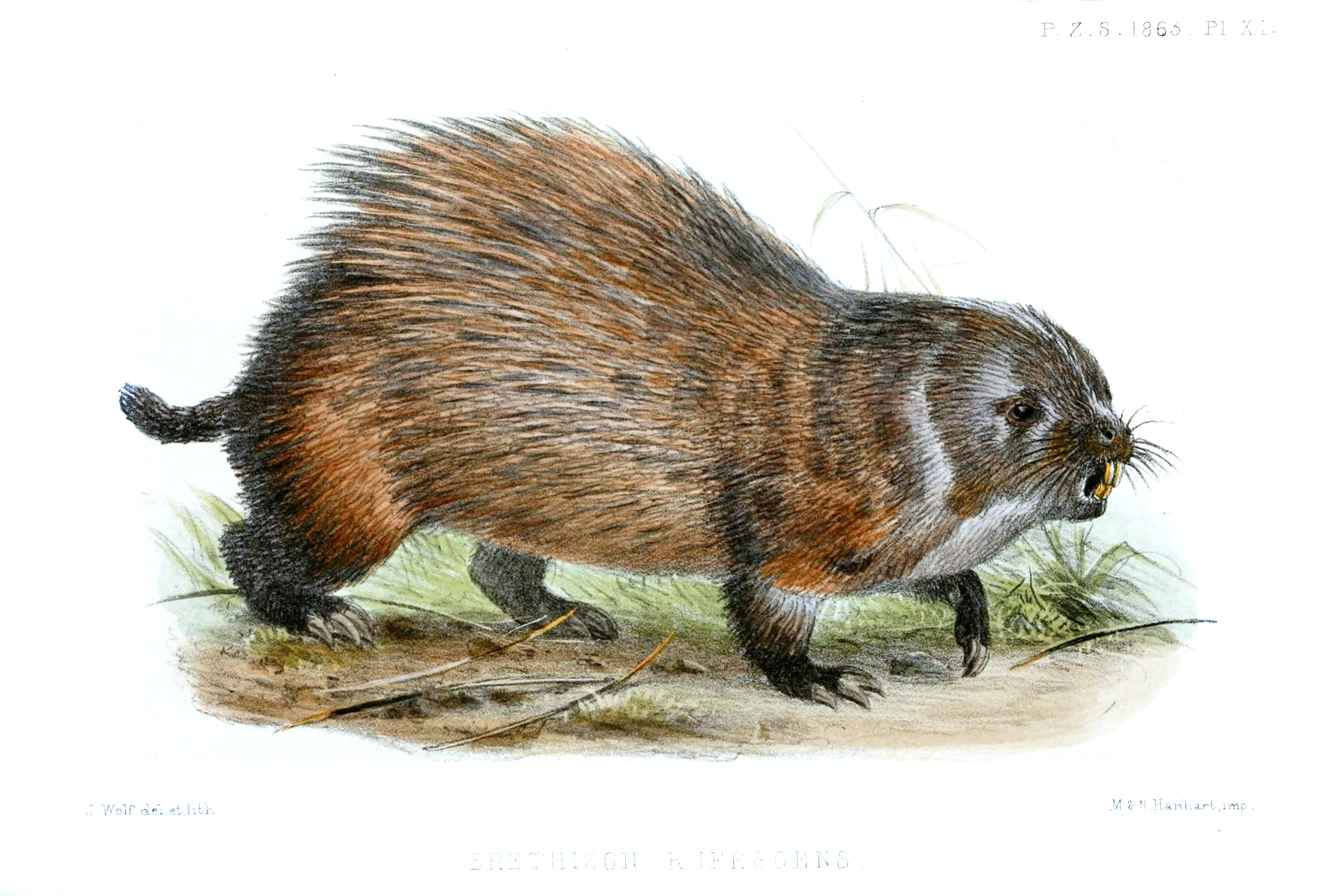

Conservation status
- Least Concern (IUCN 3.1)

Scientific classification
- Kingdom: Animalia
- Phylum: Chordata
- Class: Mammalia
- Order: Rodentia
- Family: Erethizontidae
- Genus: Coendou
- Species: C. rufescens

Binomial name
- Coendou rufescens (J. E. Gray, 1865)

= Stump-tailed porcupine =

Species of rodent

The stump-tailed porcupine (Coendou rufescens) is a species of rodent in the family Erethizontidae. It is found mainly in Colombia, with a few records from Ecuador.

This species was formerly sometimes assigned to Echinoprocta, a genus no longer recognized since genetic studies showed it to nest within Coendou. Its closest relative is the Andean porcupine (Coendou quichua).
