= Frosted hairy dwarf porcupine =

Conservation status
- Least Concern (IUCN 3.1)

Scientific classification
- Kingdom: Animalia
- Phylum: Chordata
- Class: Mammalia
- Order: Rodentia
- Family: Erethizontidae
- Genus: Coendou
- Species: C. pruinosus

Binomial name
- Coendou pruinosus Thomas, 1905

Species of rodent

The frosted hairy dwarf porcupine (Coendou pruinosus) is a porcupine species in the family Erethizontidae from Colombia and northern and eastern Venezuela. It was formerly sometimes assigned to Sphiggurus, a genus no longer recognized since genetic studies showed it to be polyphyletic. The species lives in lowland tropical rainforest and cloud forest at elevations from 50 to 2,600 meters (160 to 8,530 ft). Its karyotype has 2n = 42 and FN = 76. Its closest relative is the brown hairy dwarf porcupine (Coendou vestitus).
