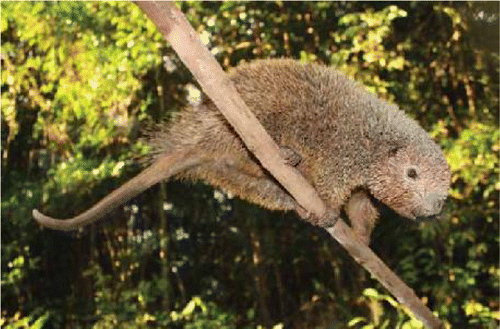

Conservation status
- Vulnerable (IUCN 3.1)

Scientific classification
- Kingdom: Animalia
- Phylum: Chordata
- Class: Mammalia
- Order: Rodentia
- Family: Erethizontidae
- Subfamily: Chaetomyinae; Thomas, 1897
- Genus: Chaetomys; J. E Gray, 1843
- Species: C. subspinosus

Binomial name
- Chaetomys subspinosus (Olfers, 1818)
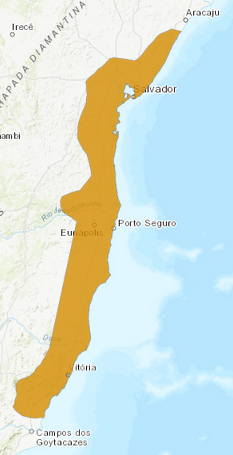

= Bristle-spined rat =

Species of rodent

The bristle-spined rat (Chaetomys subspinosus) is an arboreal rodent from the Atlantic forest in eastern Brazil. Also known as the bristle-spined porcupine or thin-spined porcupine, it is the only member of the genus Chaetomys and the subfamily Chaetomyinae. It was officially described in 1818, but rarely sighted since, until December 1986, when two specimens—one a pregnant female—were found in the vicinity of Valencia in Bahia. Since then it has been recorded at several localities in eastern Brazil, from Sergipe to Espírito Santo (there are no recent records from Rio de Janeiro), but it remains rare and threatened due to habitat loss, poaching and roadkills.

== Characteristics ==
Bristle-spined rats are named because the spines on the back are more bristle-like in texture than the spines on the rest of the body. They have long, naked tails which are not prehensile. Adult animals weigh around 1.3 kg (2.9 lb).

Their skulls are unusual in several ways. The eye socket is almost completely surrounded by a ring of bone. Incisors are distinctly narrow. Overall, the animal displays a mix of New World porcupine cranial characters, spiny rat cranial characters, and characters that set it apart from all other rodents.

The bristle-spined rat is restricted to remnant forests and forest edges in the Atlantic coastal forests on the east coast of Brazil. Its habitat is dwindling rapidly and the species may be vulnerable to extinction. It is classified as vulnerable by the IUCN and endangered by the U.S. Fish and Wildlife Service.

== Taxonomic controversy ==
No consensus has been reached as to the taxonomic position of Chaetomys. It is commonly placed with the New World porcupines in the family Erethizontidae or with the spiny rats the family Echimyidae. Both are South American hystricognaths with hairs modified as spines or quills. Chaetomys has more highly developed spines than the spiny rats, but less developed than the porcupines. Characteristics of the premolar suggest that it belongs with the Echimyidae, but characteristics of the incisor enamel suggest that it belongs in the Erethizontidae.

Patterson and Pascual (1968), Patterson and Wood (1982), Woods (1982, 1984, 1993) Patton and Reig (1989), Nowak (1999), and Carvalho (2000) support the inclusion of this animal in Echimyidae whereas Martin (1994), McKenna and Bell (1997), Carvalho and Salles (2004), and Woods and Kilpatrick (2005) argue that it belongs in Erethizontidae. Emmons (2005) mentions the family Chaetomyidae without much further comment except to exclude it from Echimyidae.

A molecular phylogeny based on the mitochondrial gene coding for cytochrome b combined to karyological evidence actually suggests that Chaetomys is more closely related to the Erethizontidae than to the Echimyidae, although it branches as the sister group to the rest of the Erethizontidae.
