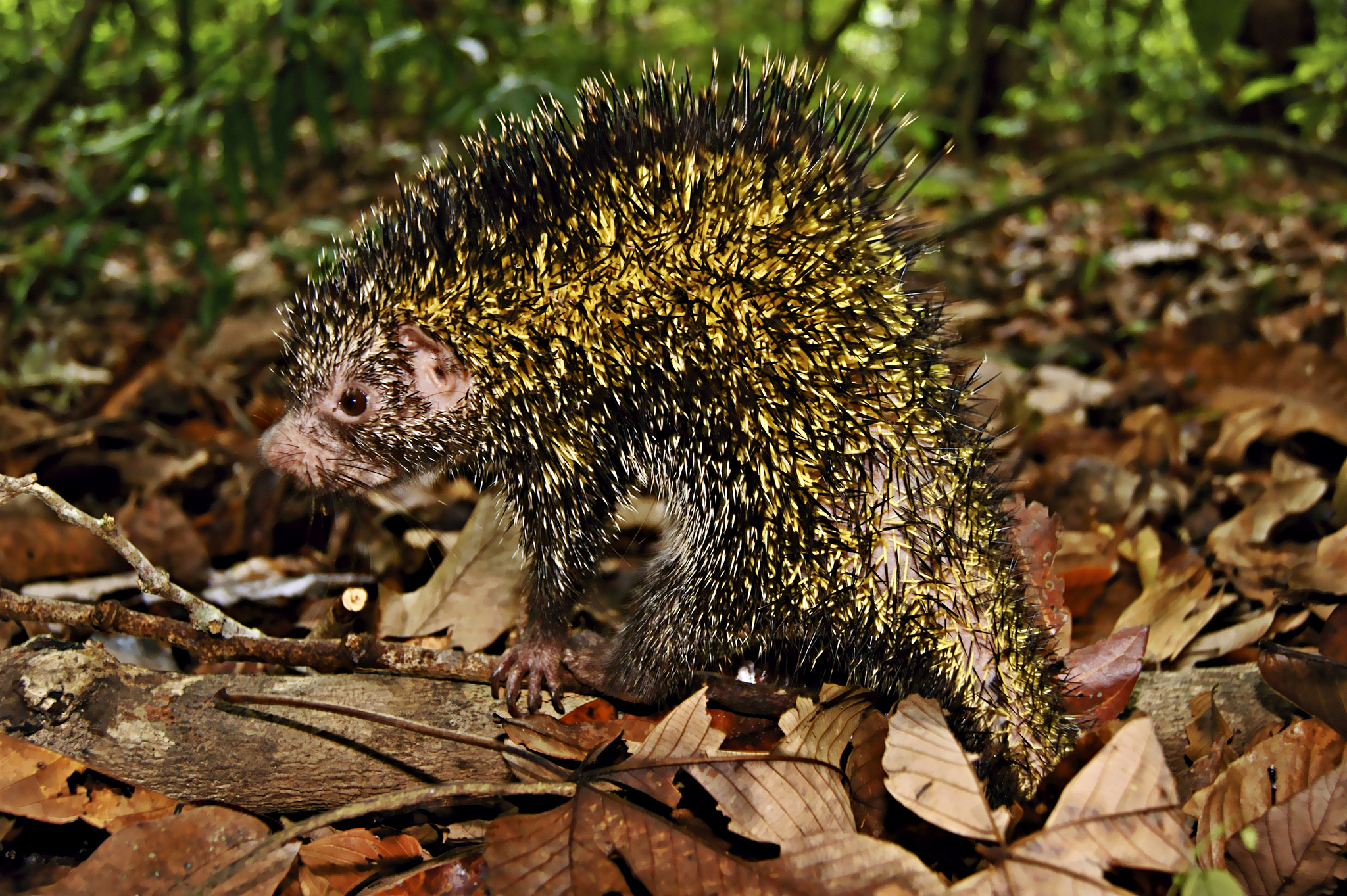

Conservation status
- Data Deficient (IUCN 3.1)

Scientific classification
- Kingdom: Animalia
- Phylum: Chordata
- Class: Mammalia
- Order: Rodentia
- Family: Erethizontidae
- Genus: Coendou
- Species: C. nycthemera

Binomial name
- Coendou nycthemera (Olfers, 1818)
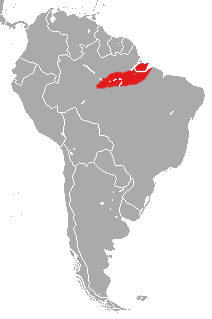

Synonyms
- Coendou koopmani Handley & Pine, 1992

= Black dwarf porcupine =

Species of rodent

The black dwarf porcupine, also known as Koopman's porcupine (Coendou nycthemera), is a porcupine species from the New World porcupine family endemic to northern Brazil. It occurs in the Amazon rainforest east of the Madeira River and south of the Amazon River. It inhabits primary forest and possibly second growth. It was described as Coendou koopmani by Charles O. Handley Jr. and Ronald H. Pine in 1992, but was subsequently found to be identical to a species described in 1818. It is nocturnal and herbivorous.
