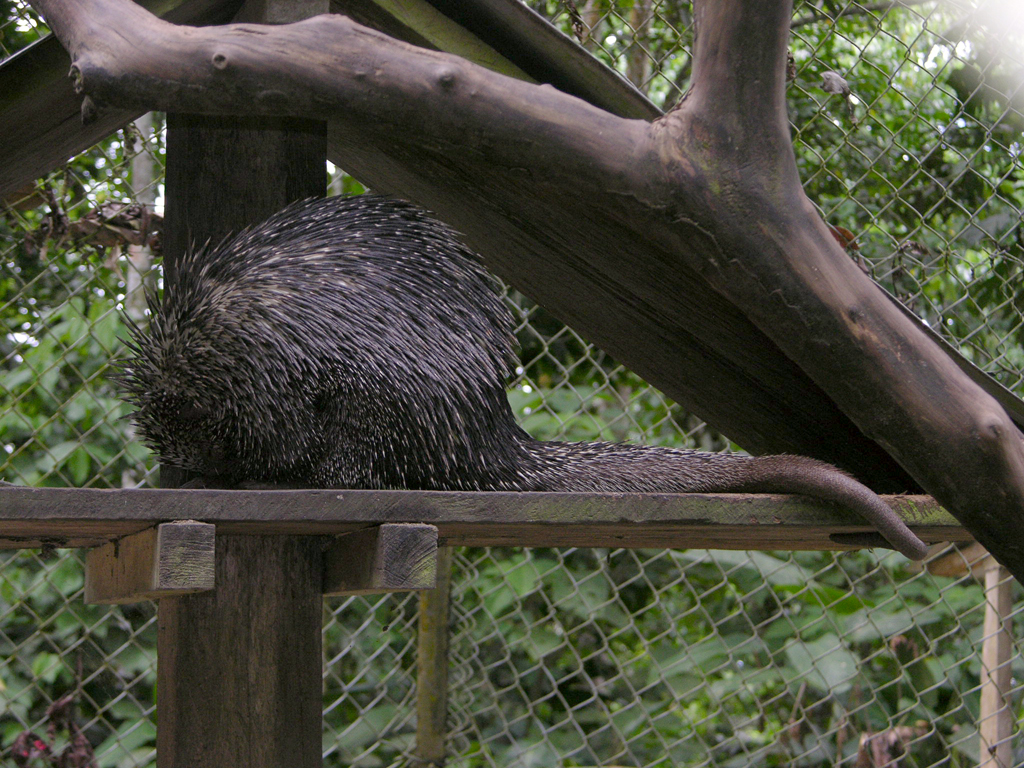

Conservation status
- Least Concern (IUCN 3.1)

Scientific classification
- Kingdom: Animalia
- Phylum: Chordata
- Class: Mammalia
- Order: Rodentia
- Family: Erethizontidae
- Genus: Coendou
- Species: C. bicolor

Binomial name
- Coendou bicolor (Tschudi, 1844)

Subspecies
- C. b. bicolor Tschudi, 1844; C. b. quichua Thomas, 1899; C. b. richardsoni Allen, 1913; C. b. simonsi Thomas, 1902
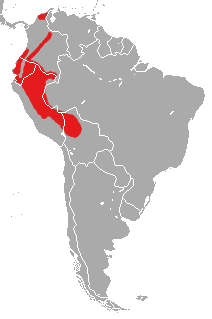

= Bicolored-spined porcupine =

Species of rodent

The bicolored-spined porcupine (Coendou bicolor) is a species of nocturnal and arboreal rodent in the family Erethizontidae. It is found in Bolivia, Colombia, Ecuador, and Peru.

The head and body of Coendou bicolor measure about 543 mm (21.4 in), and another 481 mm (18.9 in) is tail. The body is covered with dense spines, pale yellow at the base and black-tipped, and significantly darker on the midback. The bicolored-spined porcupine has a fully prehensile tail that is primarily free of spines.
