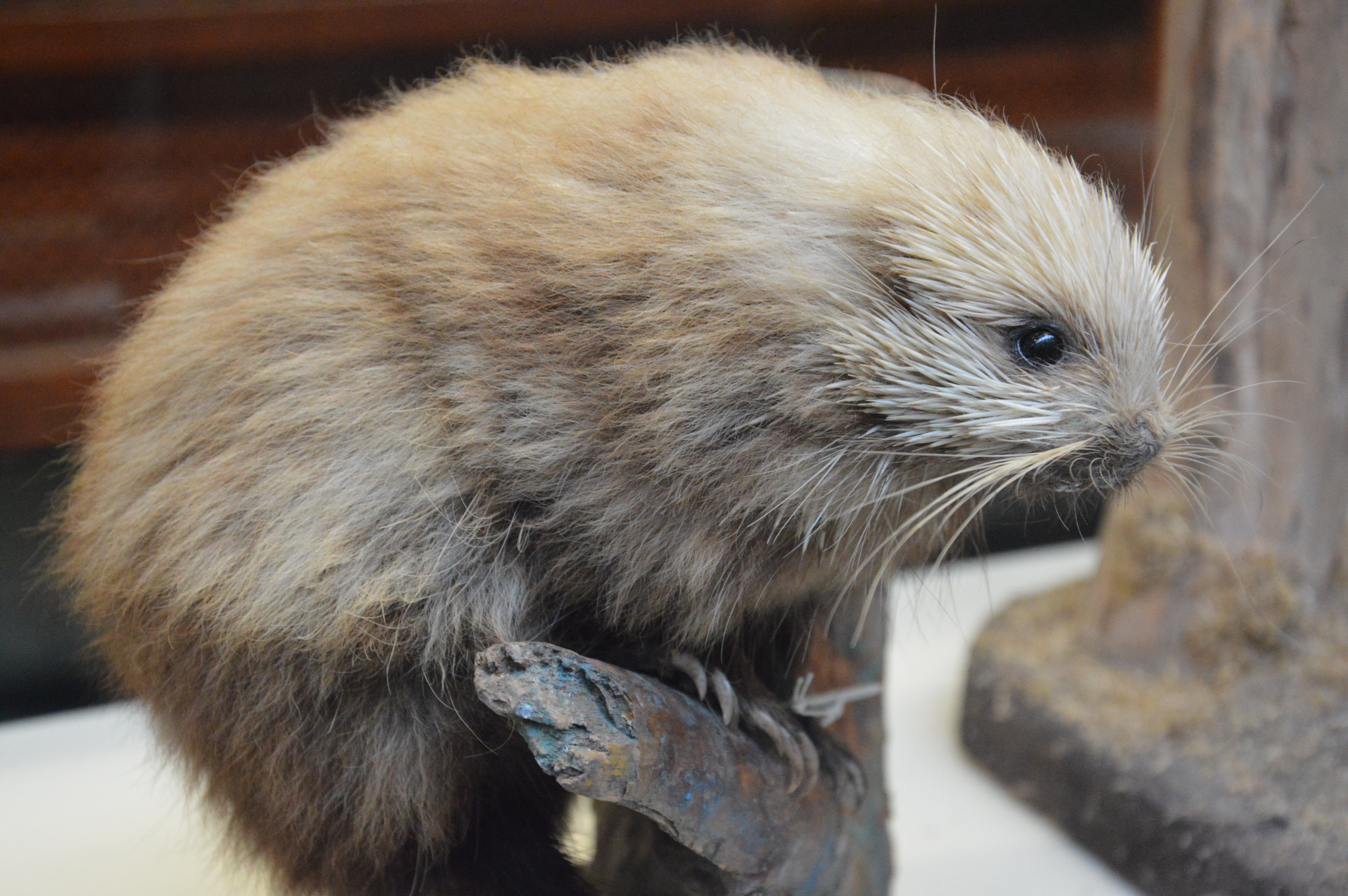

Conservation status
- Data Deficient (IUCN 3.1)

Scientific classification
- Kingdom: Animalia
- Phylum: Chordata
- Class: Mammalia
- Order: Rodentia
- Family: Erethizontidae
- Genus: Coendou
- Species: C. vestitus

Binomial name
- Coendou vestitus Thomas, 1899

= Brown hairy dwarf porcupine =

Species of rodent

The brown hairy dwarf porcupine (Coendou vestitus) is a species of rodent in the family Erethizontidae. Found in the Andes in Colombia and Venezuela, its natural habitat is subtropical or tropical moist lowland forests. It is not easy to study as it is known only from a few specimens and was not recorded from 1925 until the 2000s. The porcupine is nocturnal and arboreal, feeding on leaves, shoots, and fruits. Habitat loss severely threatens it, and it may even be extinct. Formerly listed as vulnerable, it is now designated data deficient. It is not known from any protected areas or conservation measures.

This species was formerly sometimes assigned to Sphiggurus, a genus no longer recognized since genetic studies showed it to be polyphyletic. Its closest relative is the frosted hairy dwarf porcupine (Coendou pruinosus).
