= List of hystricids =

Species in mammal family Hystricidae

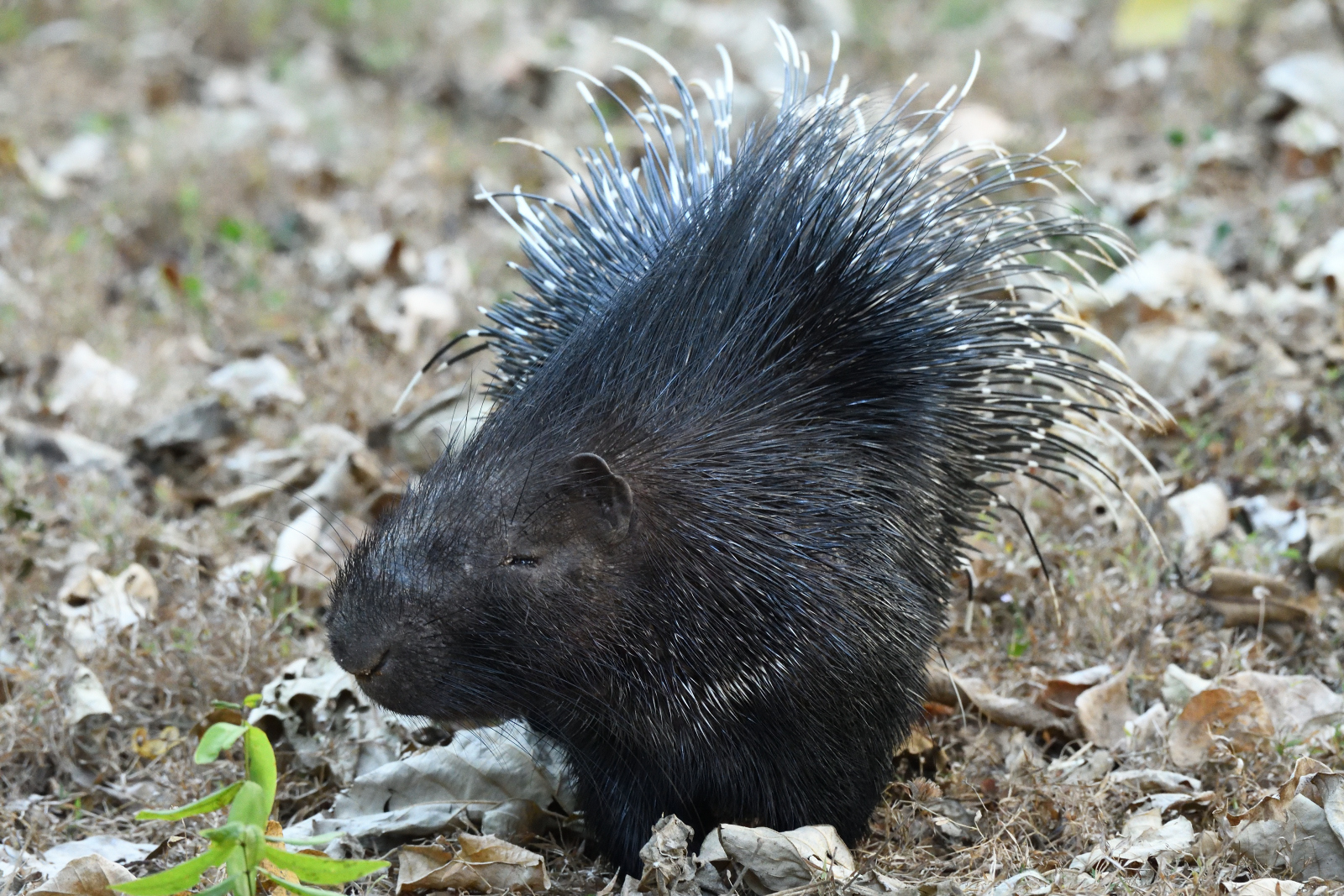
Indian crested porcupine (Hystrix indica)

Hystricidae is a family of mammals in the order Rodentia and part of the infraorder Hystricognathi. Members of this family are called hystricids or Old World porcupines. They are found in Southern Europe, the Levant, Africa, India, and Southeast Asia, and can be found in shrublands, grasslands, forests and savannas, though some species have particular habitat and dietary requirements. They range in size from the long-tailed porcupine, at 48 cm (19 in) plus a 23 cm (9 in) tail, to the crested porcupine, at 93 cm (37 in) plus a 17 cm (7 in) tail. Hystricids are primarily herbivores and eat grasses, bulbs, tubers, fruit, bark, and roots, though insects and carrion are occasionally eaten. No hystricids have population estimates, and none are categorized as an endangered species or critically endangered.

The eleven extant species of Hystricidae are divided into three genera: Atherurus consists of two species, the African and Asiatic brush-tailed porcupine, Hystrix contains eight species of porcupines in three subgenera, and Trichys consists of a single species, the long-tailed porcupine. At least eight extinct prehistoric hystricid species have been discovered, with the most recent new description of an extinct species occurring in 2023.

== Conventions ==
IUCN Red List categories
Conservation status
- EX: Extinct (0 species)
- EW: Extinct in the wild (0 species)
- CR: Critically endangered (0 species)
- EN: Endangered (0 species)
- VU: Vulnerable (1 species)
- NT: Near threatened (0 species)
- LC: Least concern (10 species)

Other categories
- DD: Data deficient (0 species)
- NE: Not evaluated (0 species)

The author citation for the species or genus is given after the scientific name; parentheses around the author citation indicate that this was not the original taxonomic placement. Conservation status codes listed follow the International Union for Conservation of Nature (IUCN) Red List of Threatened Species. Ranges are based on the IUCN Red List data for that species.

== Classification ==
Hystricidae is a family consisting of eleven species in three genera.

- Family Hystricidae
  - Genus Atherurus (brush-tailed porcupines): two species
  - Genus Hystrix (Old World porcupines): eight species
  - Genus Trichys (long-tailed porcupine): one species

Hystricidae distribution map

== Hystricids ==
The following classification is based on the taxonomy described by the reference work Mammal Species of the World (2005), with augmentation by generally accepted proposals made since using molecular phylogenetic analysis, as supported by both the IUCN and the American Society of Mammalogists.

Genus Atherurus – F. Cuvier, 1829 – two species
Common name	Scientific name and subspecies	Range	Size and ecology	IUCN status and estimated population
African brush-tailed porcupine	A. africanus (J. E. Gray, 1842)	Central Africa	Size: 36–60 cm (14–24 in) long, plus 10–26 cm (4–10 in) tail Habitat: Forest Diet: Vegetation, bark, roots, tubers, and fruit, as well as cultivated crops, insects, and carrion	LC Unknown
Asiatic brush-tailed porcupine	A. macrourus (Linnaeus, 1758)	Southeast Asia, southern China	Size: 38–57 cm (15–22 in) long, plus 16–20 cm (6–8 in) tail Habitat: Forest, shrubland Diet: Vegetation, bark, roots, tubers, and fruit, as well as cultivated crops, insects, and carrion	LC Unknown

Genus Hystrix – Linnaeus, 1758 – eight species
Common name	Scientific name and subspecies	Range	Size and ecology	IUCN status and estimated population
Cape porcupine	H. africaeaustralis Peters, 1852 Two subspecies: H. a. africaeaustralis; H. a. zuluensis	Southern Africa	Size: 63–81 cm (25–32 in) long, plus 10–13 cm (4–5 in) tail Habitat: Savanna, shrubland, grassland Diet: Bark, roots, tubers, rhizomes, bulbs, fruit, and cultivated crops, occasionally insects, small vertebrates, and carrion	LC Unknown
Crested porcupine	H. cristata (Linnaeus, 1758)	Africa, Italy	Size: 45–93 cm (18–37 in) long, plus 6–17 cm (2–7 in) tail Habitat: Forest, savanna, shrubland, grassland, rocky areas Diet: Bark, roots, tubers, rhizomes, bulbs, fruit, and cultivated crops, as well as carrion	LC Unknown
Indian crested porcupine	H. indica Kerr, 1792	The Levant and south Asia	Size: 45–93 cm (18–37 in) long, plus 6–17 cm (2–7 in) tail Habitat: Forest, shrubland, grassland Diet: Bark, roots, tubers, rhizomes, bulbs, fruit, and cultivated crops, as well as carrion	LC Unknown
Malayan porcupine	H. brachyura (Linnaeus, 1758) Five subspecies: H. b. brachyura; H. b. bengalensis; H. b. hodgsoni; H. b. subcristata; H. b. yunnanensis	China, Nepal, Malaysia, Indonesia	Size: 45–93 cm (18–37 in) long, plus 6–17 cm (2–7 in) tail Habitat: Forest, shrubland, grassland Diet: Bark, roots, tubers, rhizomes, bulbs, fruit, and cultivated crops, as well as carrion	LC Unknown
Philippine porcupine	H. pumila (Günther, 1879)	Palawan	Size: 45–67 cm (18–26 in) long, plus 6–19 cm (2–7 in) tail Habitat: Forest, shrubland Diet: Bark, roots, tubers, rhizomes, bulbs, fruit, and cultivated crops, as well as carrion	VU Unknown
Sumatran porcupine	H. sumatrae (Lyon, 1907)	Sumatra	Size: 45–56 cm (18–22 in) long, plus 9–11 cm (4–4 in) tail Habitat: Forest, shrubland Diet: Bark, roots, tubers, rhizomes, bulbs, fruit, and cultivated crops, as well as carrion	LC Unknown
Sunda porcupine	H. javanica (F. Cuvier, 1823)	Java	Size: 45–66 cm (18–26 in) long, plus 6–17 cm (2–7 in) tail Habitat: Forest, shrubland Diet: Bark, roots, tubers, rhizomes, bulbs, fruit, and cultivated crops, as well as carrion	LC Unknown
Thick-spined porcupine	H. crassispinis (Günther, 1877)	Borneo	Size: 45–67 cm (18–26 in) long, plus 6–19 cm (2–7 in) tail Habitat: Forest Diet: Bark, roots, tubers, rhizomes, bulbs, fruit, and cultivated crops, as well as carrion	LC Unknown

Genus Trichys – Günther, 1877 – one species
Common name	Scientific name and subspecies	Range	Size and ecology	IUCN status and estimated population
Long-tailed porcupine	T. fasciculata (Shaw, 1801)	Brunei, Indonesia, Malaysia	Size: 35–48 cm (14–19 in) long, plus 17–24 cm (7–9 in) tail Habitat: Forest Diet: Seeds, vegetation from trees, shrubs, and bamboo	LC Unknown

== Sources ==
- Barthelmess, Erika L. (2016). Wilson, D. E.; Lacher, T. E.; Mittermeier, R. A. (eds.). Handbook of the Mammals of the World. Vol. 6. Lagomorphs and Rodents I. Lynx Edicions. ISBN 978-84-941892-3-4.
- Nowak, Ronald M. (1999). Walker's Mammals of the World. Vol. 2 (6th ed.). Johns Hopkins University Press. ISBN 978-0-8018-5789-8.
- Woods, Charles A.; Kilpatrick, C. William (2005). Wilson, Don E.; Reeder, DeeAnn M. (eds.). Mammal Species of the World. Vol. 2 (3rd ed.). Johns Hopkins University Press. ISBN 978-0-8018-8221-0.
