= List of porcupines =

Porcupines are large rodents with coats of sharp spines, or quills, that protect them against predation. The term covers two families of animals: the Old World porcupines of the family Hystricidae, and the New World porcupines of the family Erethizontidae.

- For species in the family Hystricidae, see list of hystricids
- For species in the family Erethizontidae, see list of erethizontids
