= Hystrix velunensis =

Hystrix velunensis Temporal range: Pliocene

Scientific classification
- Kingdom: Animalia
- Phylum: Chordata
- Class: Mammalia
- Order: Rodentia
- Family: Hystricidae
- Genus: Hystrix
- Species: †H. velunensis

Binomial name
- †Hystrix velunensis Czernielewski, 2023

Hystrix velunensis is an extinct species of Old World porcupine that lived during the Pliocene.

== Distribution ==
Hystrix velunensis is known from the site of Węże 1 in Poland.
