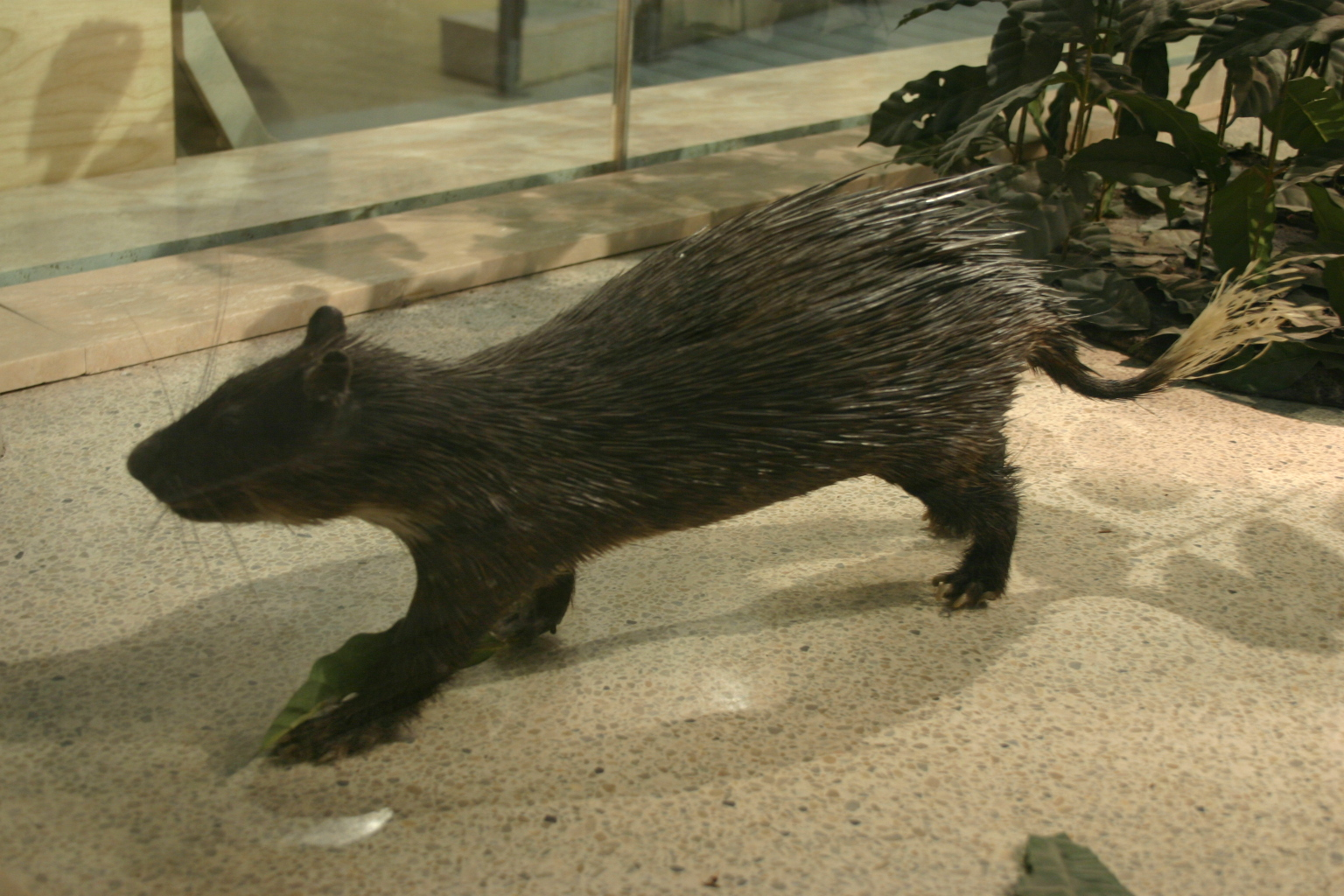
- African brush-tailed porcupine in the National Museum of Natural History

Scientific classification
- Kingdom: Animalia
- Phylum: Chordata
- Class: Mammalia
- Infraclass: Placentalia
- Order: Rodentia
- Family: Hystricidae
- Genus: Atherurus; F. Cuvier, 1829

Type species
- Hystrix macroura Linnaeus, 1758

Species
- Atherurus africanus Atherurus macrourus

= Brush-tailed porcupine =

Brush-tailed porcupines Temporal range: Early Pleistocene to Recent

Genus of mammals

The brush-tailed porcupines are a genus, Atherurus, of Old World porcupines found in Asia and Africa.

== Characteristics ==
The brush-tailed porcupines have bodies covered in quills like their New World relatives. These quills are shorter and not as visually prominent as those seen in the genus Hystrix, but considerably more so than in Trichys. They have a prominent tuft on the tip of their tails which leads to their common name. The tail breaks off easily when the animal is threatened.

Their bodies are long and somewhat rat-like. They are forest dwellers and nocturnal, and feed on vegetation, but may take insects or carrion. The animals may live in social groups usually numbering six to eight. The longevity record for a captive animal was almost 23 years.

Due to their small size (the typical brush-tailed porcupine weighs about 3 kg), it is a popular bushmeat to the urban and rural residents of Gabon, Nigeria, Cameroon or Congo.

== Species ==
The two species of Atherurus, an Asian and an African variety, are:

- A. africanus – African brush-tailed porcupine
- A. macrourus – Asiatic brush-tailed porcupine

== Predators ==
The brush-tailed porcupine has many native predators: leopards, large raptors and snakes; however, humans are their most prominent and constant predators.
