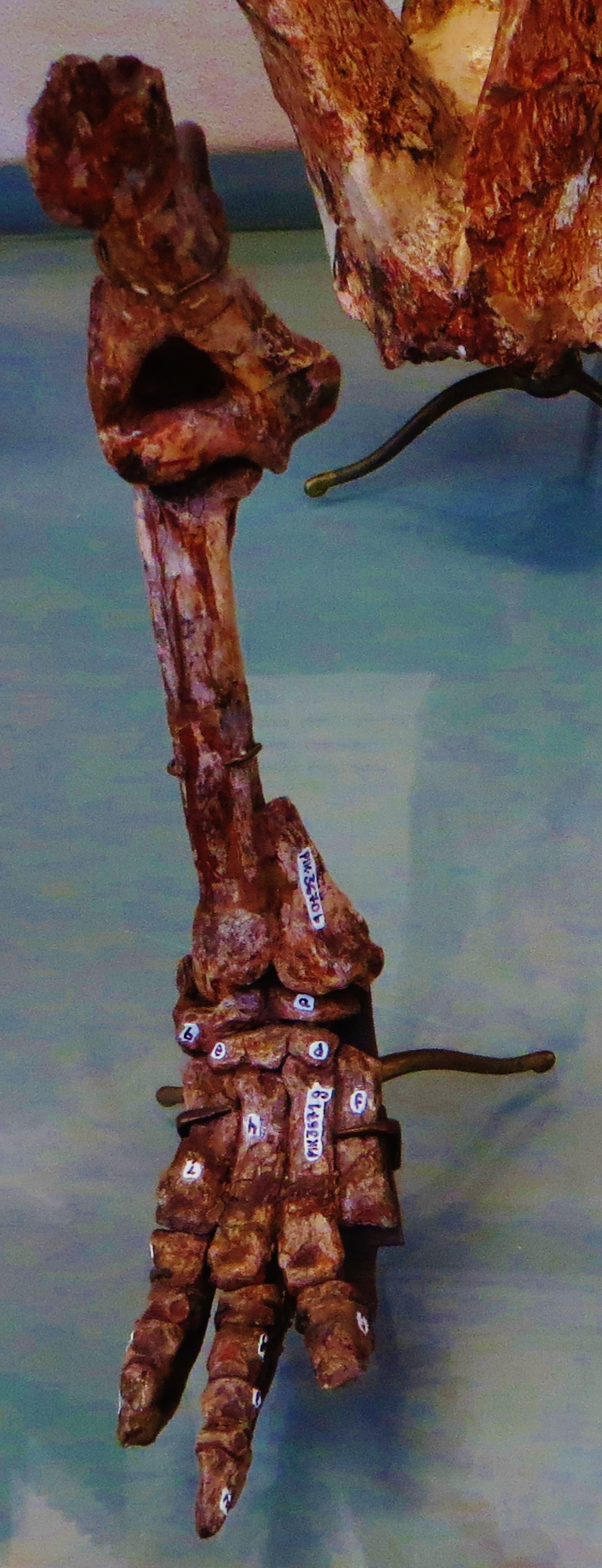
- Fossil foot of Hystrix primigenia at the Gallery of Paleontology and Comparative Anatomy, Paris.

Scientific classification
- Kingdom: Animalia
- Phylum: Chordata
- Class: Mammalia
- Order: Rodentia
- Family: Hystricidae
- Genus: Hystrix
- Species: †H. primigenia

Binomial name
- †Hystrix primigenia (Wagner, 1848)

Synonyms
- Lamprodon primigenius

= Hystrix primigenia =

Hystrix primigenia Temporal range: Late Miocene - Late Pliocene

Extinct species of rodent

Hystrix primigenia is an extinct species of Old World porcupine that lived during the Late Miocene and Pliocene. Fossils of this species were recovered mainly from southern Europe, from Spain to Turkey and North Africa as well. The earliest fossils were found in Greece and the Balkan Peninsula.

Hystrix primigenia was much larger than living porcupines, perhaps as much as twice the size of the largest living species. It probably descended from a smaller, more primitive species known as Hystrix suevica. Hystrix primigenia seems to have been adapted to warm dry climate, and inhabited areas rich in forests and open woodland environments.
