= Sivacanthion =

Sivacanthion Temporal range: middle Miocene

Scientific classification
- Domain: Eukaryota
- Kingdom: Animalia
- Phylum: Chordata
- Class: Mammalia
- Order: Rodentia
- Family: Hystricidae
- Genus: †Sivacanthion; Colbert, 1933

Species
- S. complicatus Colbert, 1933 (type)

Extinct genus of rodents

Sivacanthion is an extinct genus of rodent from the Miocene of India. The build of Sivacanthion is very like that of a modern Old World porcupine, although details of the anatomy suggest that it is not a direct ancestor but a side branch of Hystricidae known in the Indian sub-continent.

Sivacanthion lived on the ground and ate plants and fruit.

== Sources ==
- World Encyclopedia of Dinosaurs & Prehistoric Creatures - Dougal Dixon
