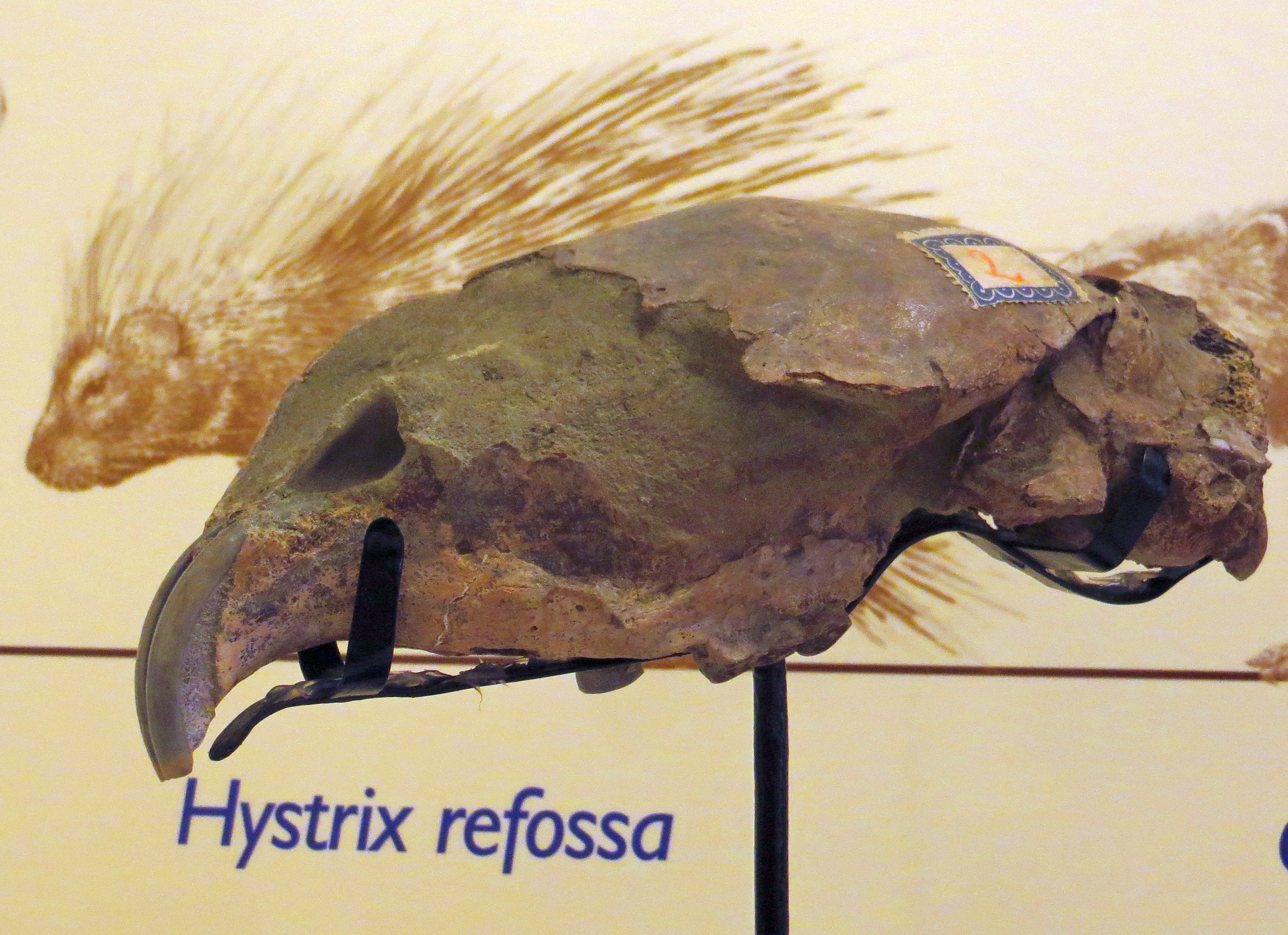
- Skull of Hystrix refossa

Scientific classification
- Kingdom: Animalia
- Phylum: Chordata
- Class: Mammalia
- Order: Rodentia
- Family: Hystricidae
- Genus: Hystrix
- Species: †H. refossa

Binomial name
- †Hystrix refossa Gervais, 1852

Synonyms
- Hystrix major Hystrix crassidens Hystrix etrusca Hystrix angressi Hyatrix gigantea Hystrix magna

= Hystrix refossa =

Hystrix refossa Temporal range: Pleistocene

Extinct species of rodent

Hystrix refossa is an extinct species of large porcupine that was widespread in Eurasia during the Pleistocene epoch.

== Taxonomy ==
Hystrix refossa was first described by palaeontologist Paul Gervais in 1852. Over the years, other large species of Hystrix have been described, including H. angressi from Israel and H. gigantea of Java. These forms are now considered synonymous with H. refossa.

== Distribution ==
H. refossa had a very wide geographic range, and has been found in countries including Spain, Greece, Israel, and Indonesia.

== Description ==
H. refossa was larger than living porcupines. It was approximately 20% larger than its closest relative, the living Indian porcupine (H. indica), reaching lengths of over 115 cm (45 in). It also differs from the Indian porcupine in having a high and narrow occipital region, in the anteriorly convergent arrangement of maxillary cheek-teeth series, and in its mandible and the cheek-teeth pattern.

== Palaeobiology ==
=== Palaeoecology ===
The earliest remains of H. refossa are dated to the start of the Villafranchian and were found at the site of Milea, Grevena in Northern Greece. It presumably inhabited vegetated river banks within a mosaic of open and forested terrain under warm and humid conditions.
