= Hystrix paukensis =

Hystrix paukensis Temporal range: late Miocene–early Pliocene

Scientific classification
- Kingdom: Animalia
- Phylum: Chordata
- Class: Mammalia
- Order: Rodentia
- Family: Hystricidae
- Genus: Hystrix
- Species: †H. paukensis

Binomial name
- †Hystrix paukensis Nishioka et al., 2011

Extinct species of rodent

Hystrix paukensis is an extinct Old World porcupine which existed during the late Miocene-early Pliocene in what is now Myanmar. It was described by Nishioka, et al. in 2011. The species epithet refers to Pauk Township, the type locality of the species.
