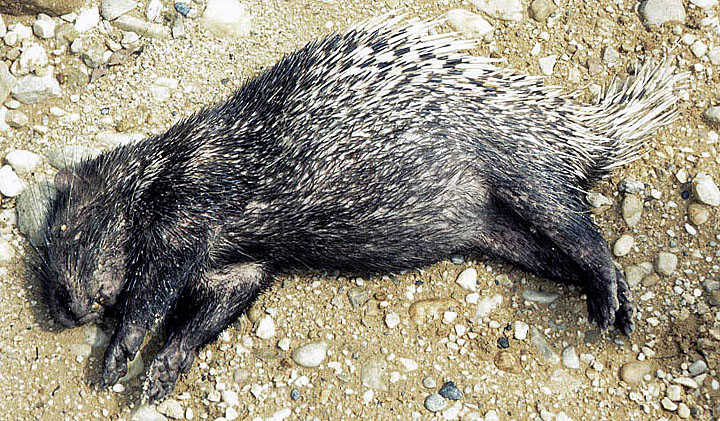
- Sumatran porcupine killed by a truck in central Sumatra

Conservation status
- Least Concern (IUCN 3.1)

Scientific classification
- Kingdom: Animalia
- Phylum: Chordata
- Class: Mammalia
- Order: Rodentia
- Family: Hystricidae
- Genus: Hystrix
- Species: H. sumatrae

Binomial name
- Hystrix sumatrae (Lyon, 1907)
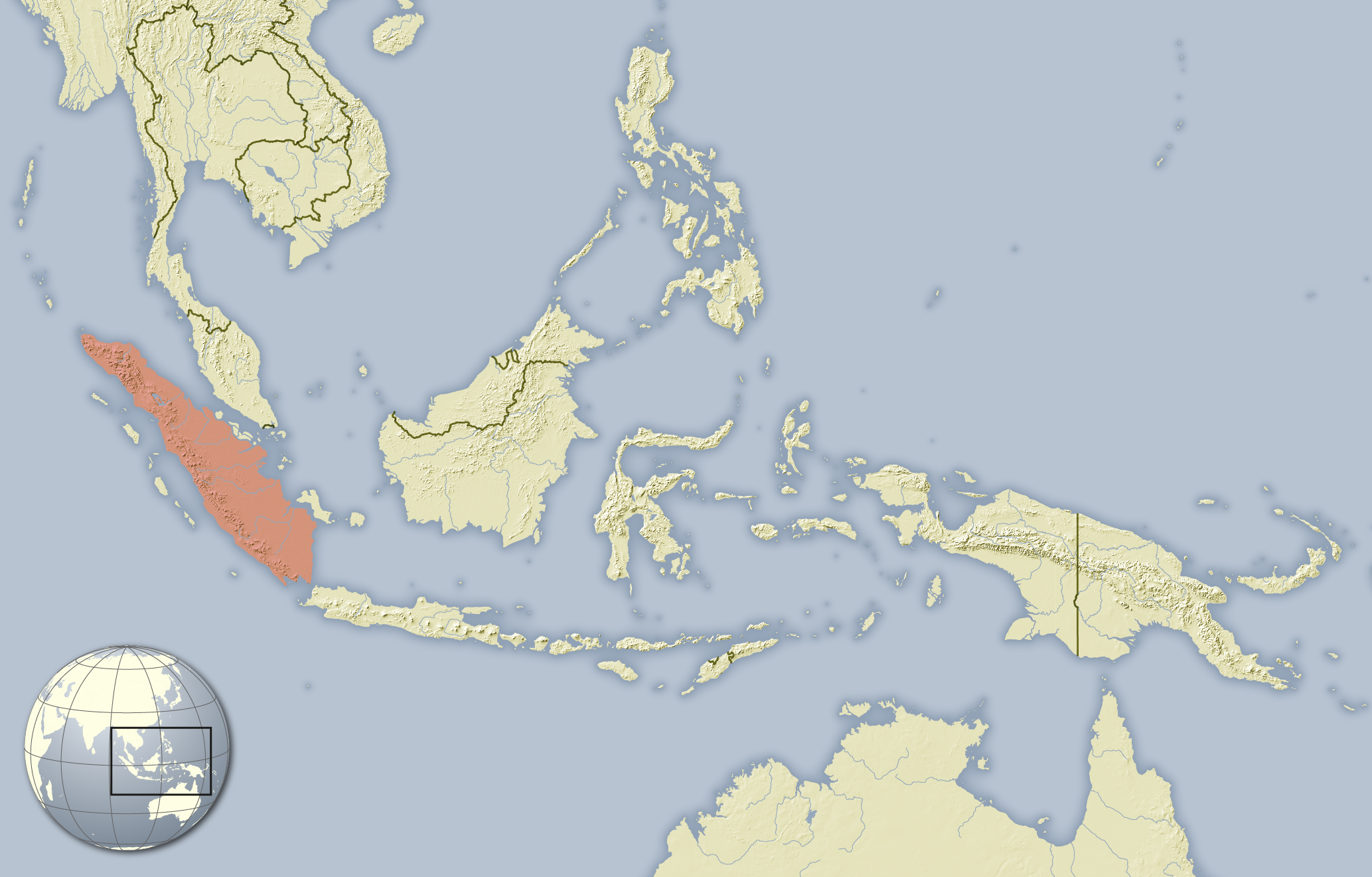

= Sumatran porcupine =

Species of rodent

The Sumatran porcupine (Hystrix sumatrae) is a species of rodent in the family Hystricidae. It is endemic to the Indonesian island of Sumatra, where it is hunted for food.
