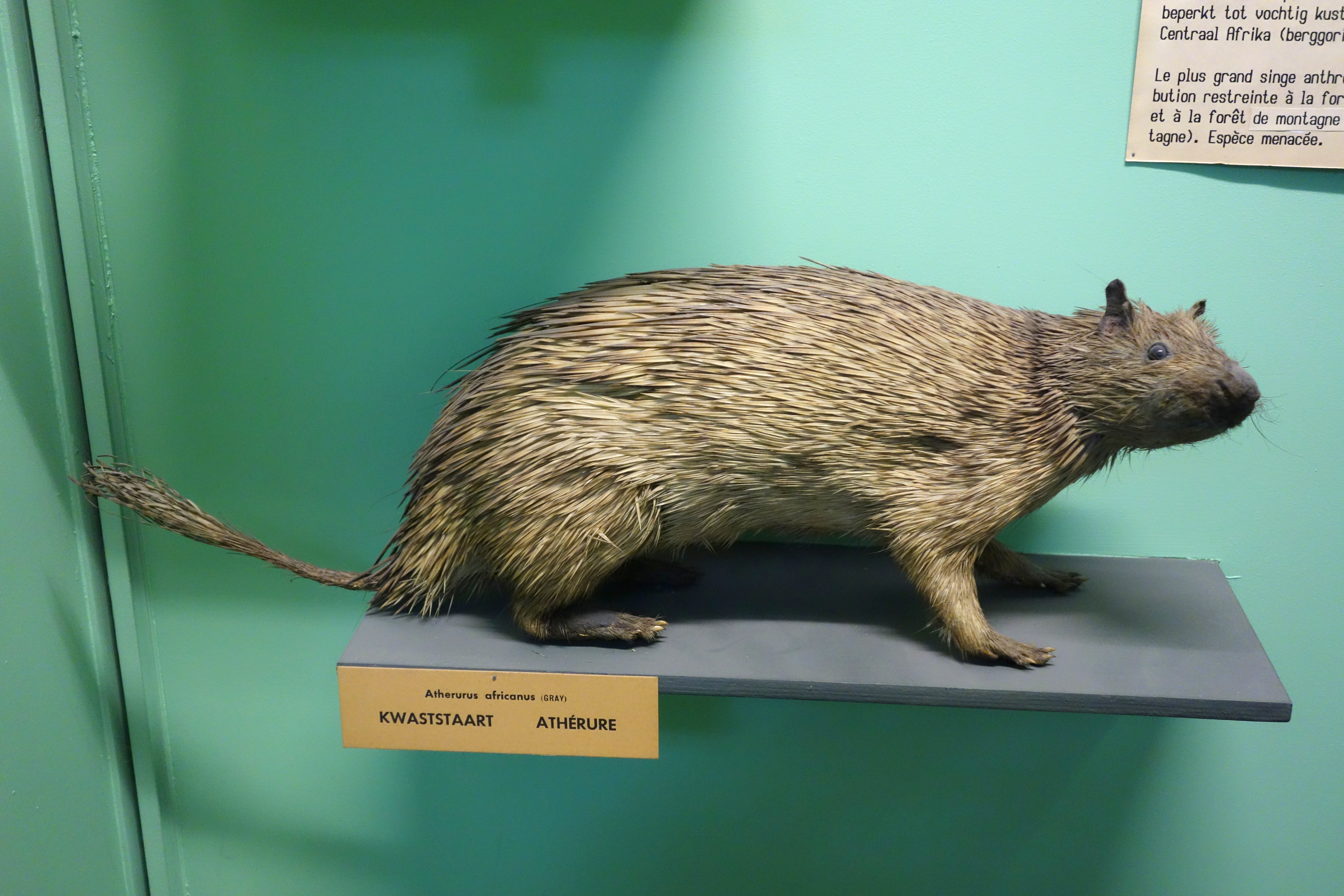

Conservation status
- Least Concern (IUCN 3.1)

Scientific classification
- Kingdom: Animalia
- Phylum: Chordata
- Class: Mammalia
- Infraclass: Placentalia
- Order: Rodentia
- Family: Hystricidae
- Genus: Atherurus
- Species: A. africanus

Binomial name
- Atherurus africanus J. E. Gray, 1842
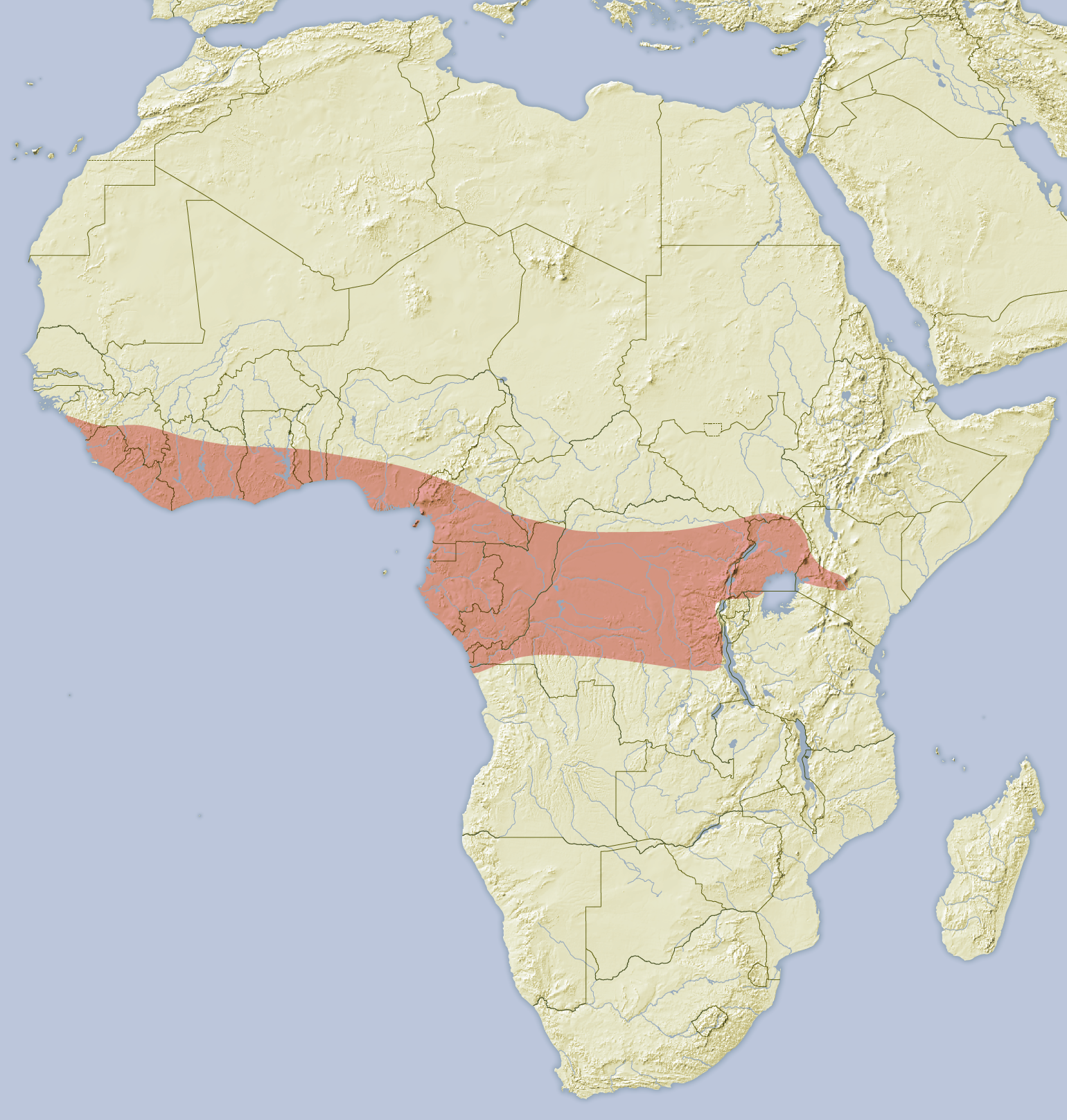

= African brush-tailed porcupine =

Species of rodent

The African brush-tailed porcupine (Atherurus africanus) is a species of rat-like Old World porcupine, indigenous to a broad belt of Africa ranging from Guinea on the west coast to Kenya on the east. This is a common species with a very wide range, and despite it being used extensively for bushmeat, the International Union for Conservation of Nature has rated its conservation status as being of "least concern".

== Description ==
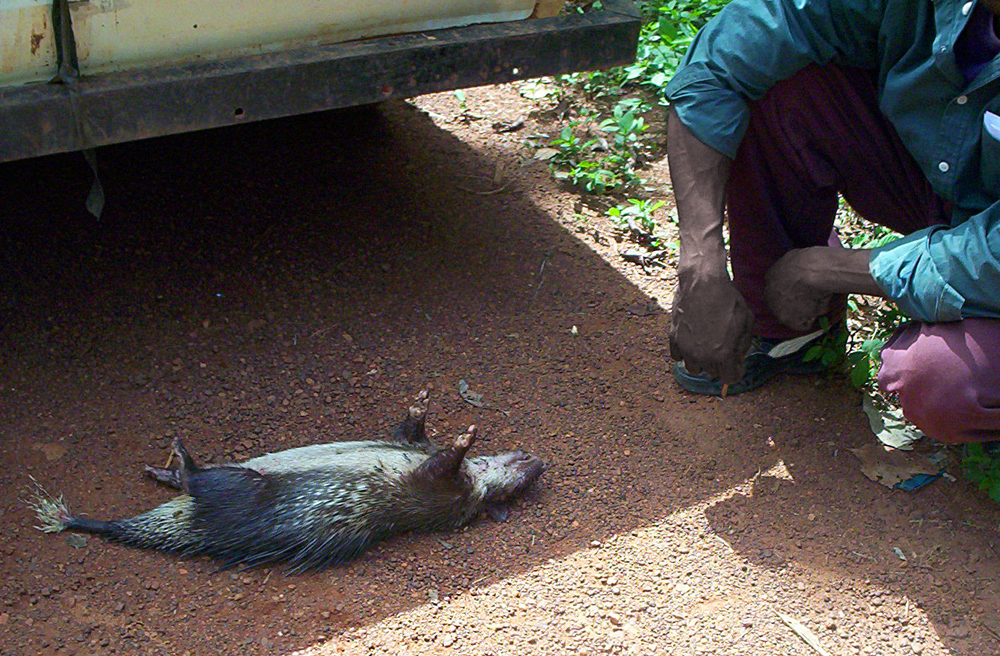
African brush-tailed porcupine sold for meat in Cameroon

The brush-tailed porcupine reaches 40 to 50 cm in length, not counting the tail. The adult weighs about 3 kg. It has an elongated, rat-like face and body and short legs, tipped with clawed and webbed feet. Unlike most other porcupines, the brush-tailed porcupine has light, small quills. On the tail, these quills are thinner and brush-like. These can make noise when rattled.

== Distribution ==
The brush-tailed porcupine occurs in Benin, Cameroon, Congo, the Democratic Republic of Congo, Equatorial Guinea, Gabon, Gambia, Ghana, Guinea, Ivory Coast, Kenya, Liberia, Nigeria, Sierra Leone, South Sudan, Togo and Uganda, in tropical rainforest at altitudes up to

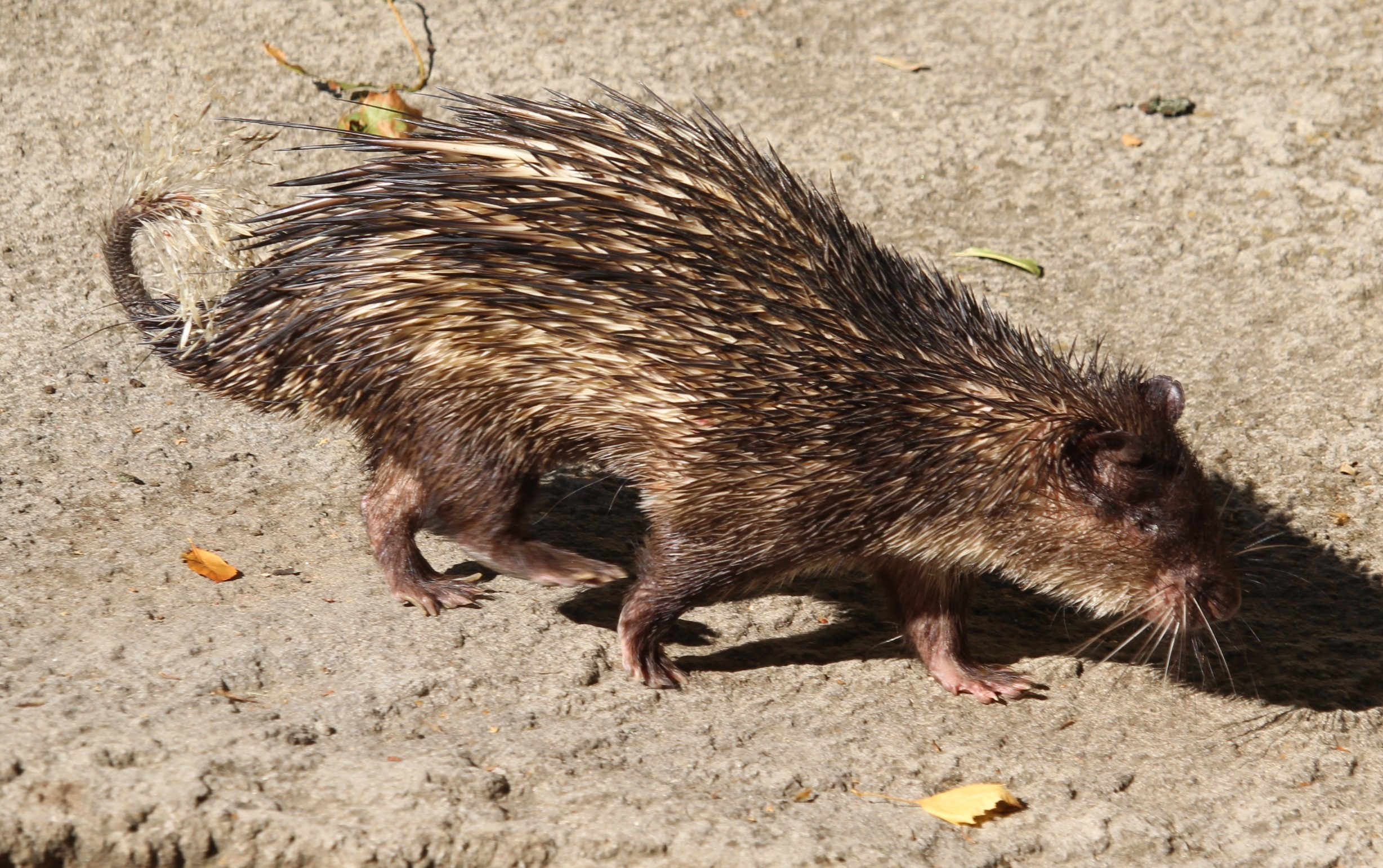
African brush-tailed porcupine in zoo berlin

3,000 m (9,800 ft).

== Ecology ==
Brush-tailed porcupines live in small family groups of about eight members. Different family groups can share resources. When attacked by a predator (such as a leopard or a human), the porcupine raises its quills so it looks twice its size, rattles its tail quills, and stomps its feet. As with all porcupines, the brush-tailed porcupine backs into the attacker and inflicts damage with its quills.

Brush-tailed porcupines live in forests, usually at high elevations, and are nocturnal, sleeping in caves and burrows during the day. They are herbivorous, feeding on leaves, flowers and fruits which have fallen to the forest floor. They also eat roots and palm nuts, and occasionally carrion, and invade crops of maize, cassava and bananas when these are grown adjacent to the forest.

Male and female form a pair bond during breeding season. The female has a long pregnancy compared to other rodents: 110 days at the longest. The young are born well-developed or precocial. They are mature at about 2 years of age. The meat of the brush-tailed porcupine is popular and is consumed in large quantities.
