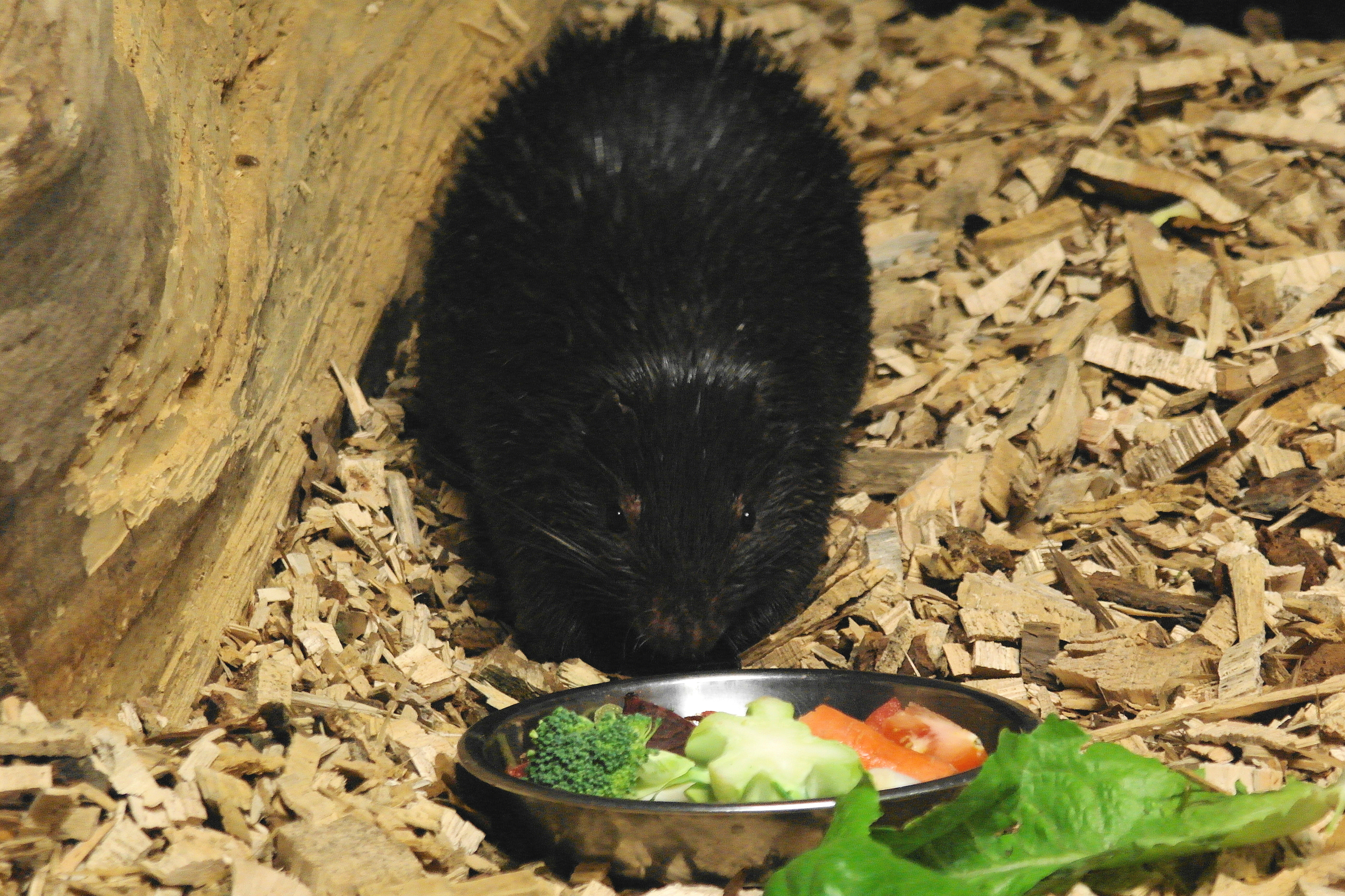

Conservation status
- Vulnerable (IUCN 3.1)

Scientific classification
- Kingdom: Animalia
- Phylum: Chordata
- Class: Mammalia
- Order: Rodentia
- Family: Hystricidae
- Genus: Hystrix
- Species: H. pumila

Binomial name
- Hystrix pumila (Günther, 1879)
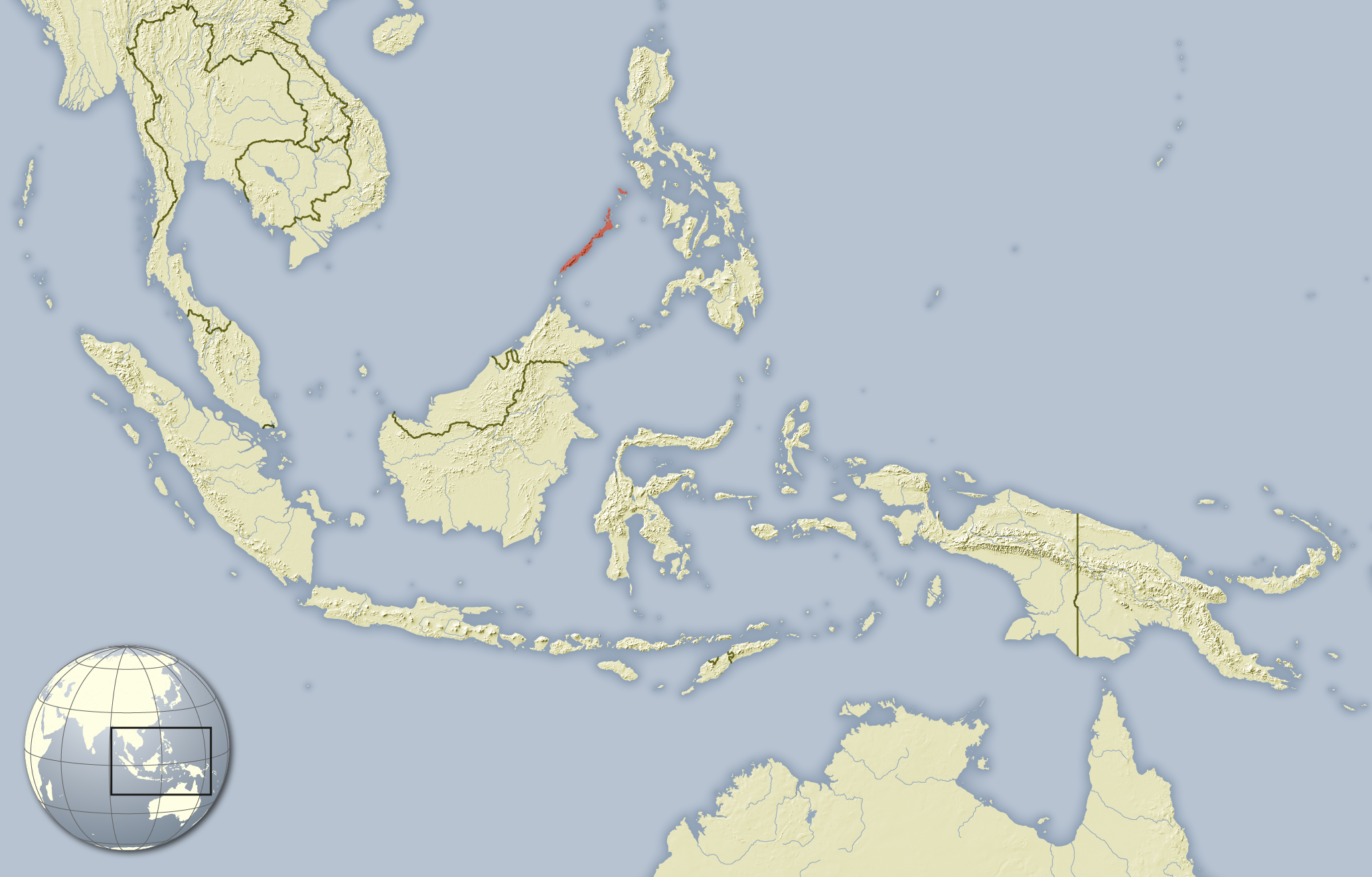

= Philippine porcupine =

Species of rodent

The Philippine porcupine or Palawan porcupine (Hystrix pumila) is a species of rodent in the family Hystricidae (Old World porcupines) endemic to the island of Palawan in the Philippines. It is known locally as durian or landak.

Apparently, its population is stable, but it is reported to be persecuted by farmers as pests in coconut plantations. Locally common to uncommon, the species is found in primary and secondary forest in the mountains and in the lowlands. This species also inhabits caves, but is commonly found under tree buttresses or in rock crevices. It is endemic and restricted to the Palawan Faunal Region. It has been recorded in the islands of Busuanga, Calauit, and Coron, and on the mainland at the Puerto Princesa Subterranean River National Park, and the forested areas of El Nido.

This mammal appears to have no natural enemies. Its outer covering of spines serves as its protection and defense system. It measures about 42–93 cm (1.38–3.05 ft) long, not counting a tail of about 2.5–19 cm (0.98–7.48 in) and weighs 3.8–5.4 kg (8.4–11.9 lb).

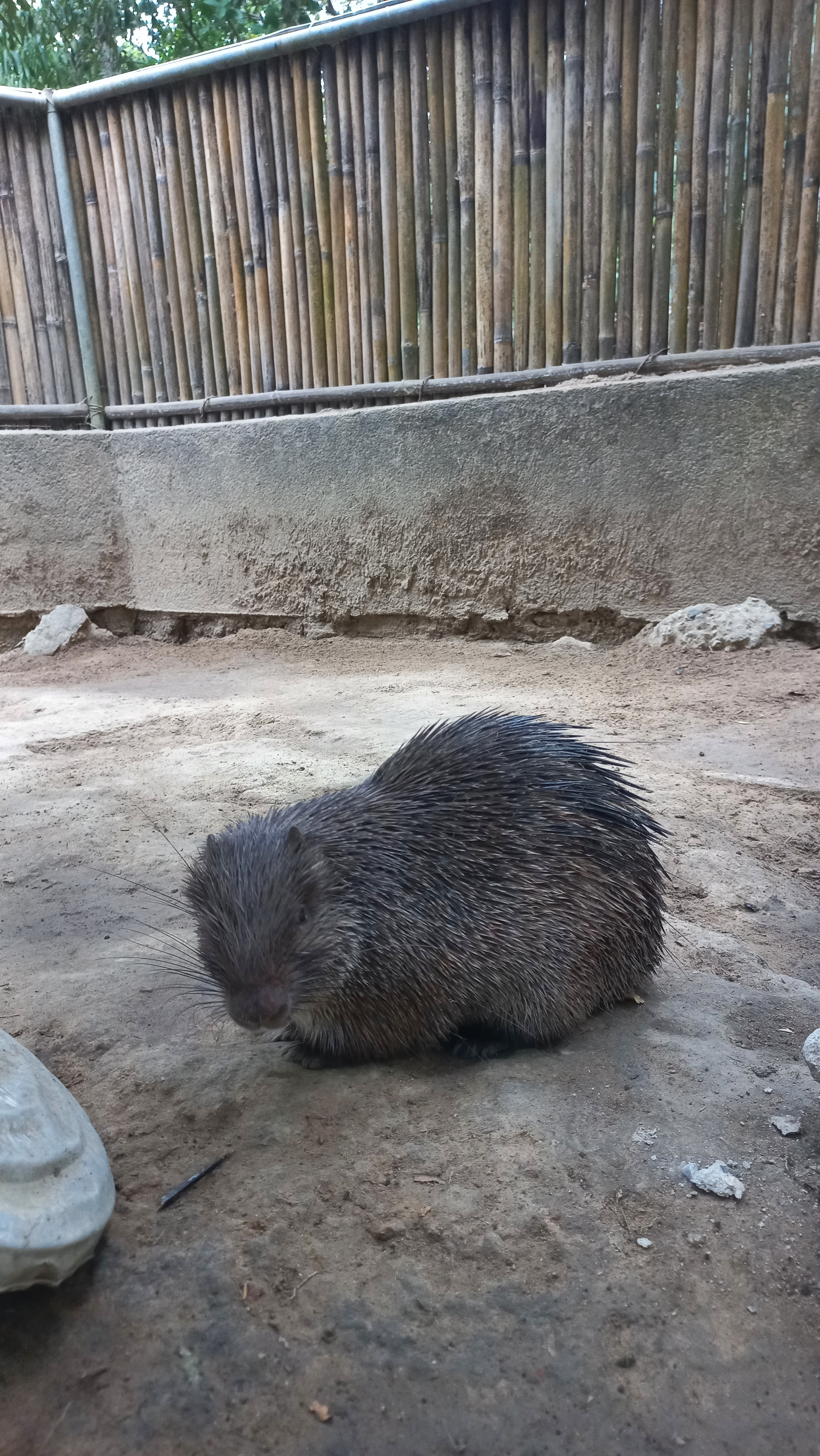
Philippine porcupine from Calauit Safari Park in Busuanga, Philippines
