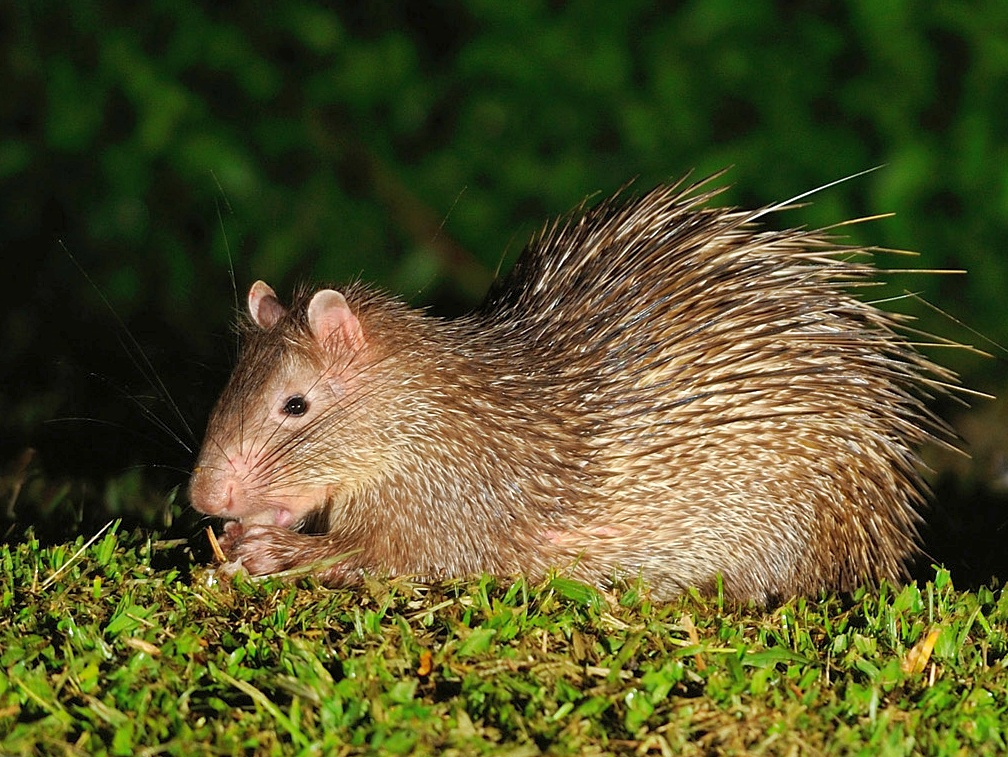

Conservation status
- Least Concern (IUCN 3.1)

Scientific classification
- Kingdom: Animalia
- Phylum: Chordata
- Class: Mammalia
- Infraclass: Placentalia
- Order: Rodentia
- Family: Hystricidae
- Genus: Atherurus
- Species: A. macrourus

Binomial name
- Atherurus macrourus (Linnaeus, 1758)
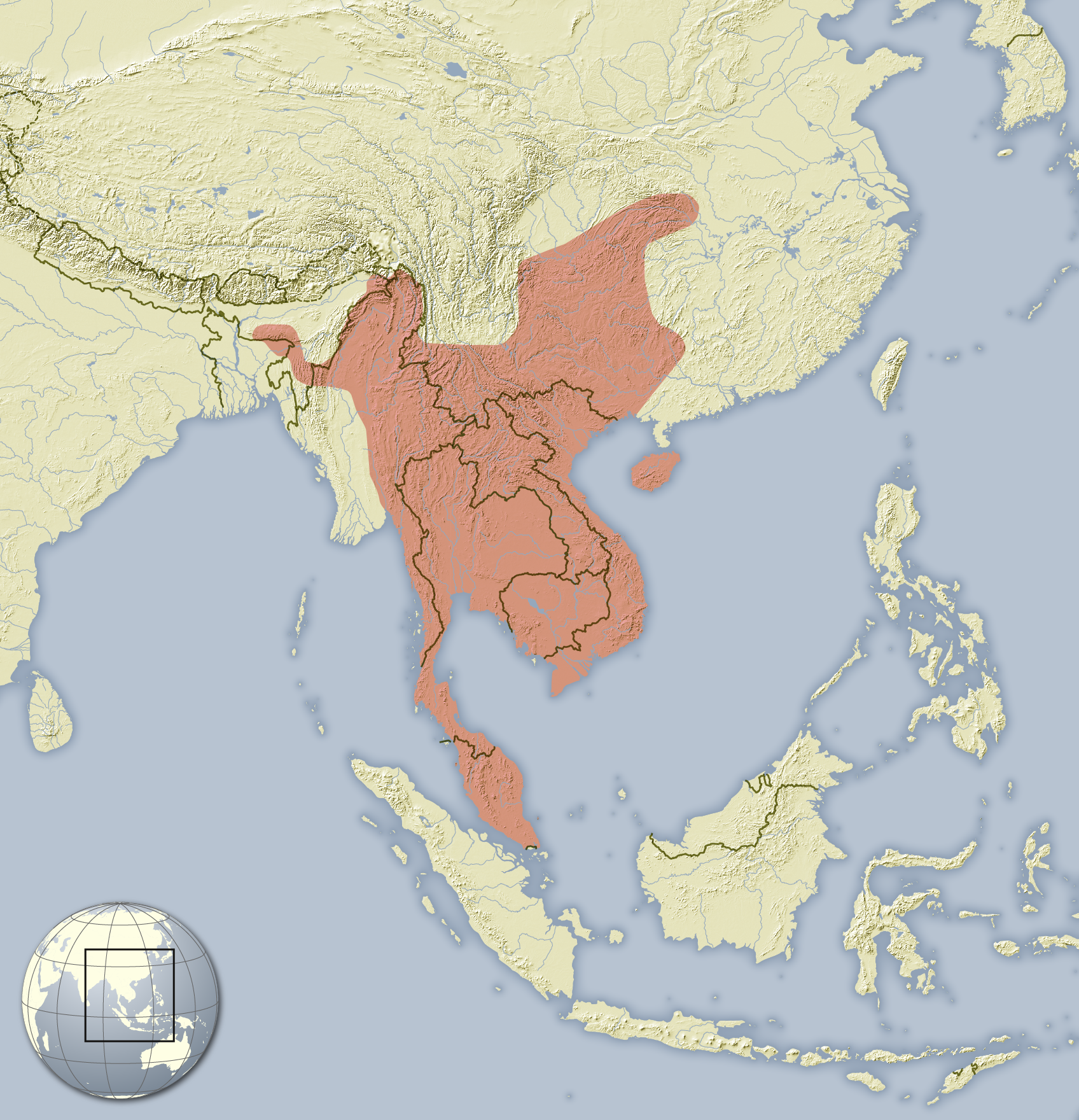

Synonyms
- Hystrix macroura Linnaeus, 1758

= Asiatic brush-tailed porcupine =

Species of rodent

The Asiatic brush-tailed porcupine (Atherurus macrourus) is a species of rodent in the family Hystricidae. It is found in Cambodia, China, Bhutan, India, Laos, Malaysia, Myanmar, Thailand, and Vietnam.

== Taxonomy ==
The synonyms of this species are Atherurus assamensis (Thomas, 1921), and Atherurus macrourus (Thomas, 1921) subspecies assamensis.

== Habitat ==
It is a nocturnal and fossorial species, occurring in subtropical and tropical montane forests. It is found on the forest floor, often in areas with profuse undergrowth interspersed with cane and bamboo brakes and palms.

== Breeding ==
It constructs burrows, which may be occupied by up to three animals. The female produces one or two litters a year, of a single young, after a gestation period of 100 to 110 days.

== Conservation ==
Known to be one of the rarest porcupines in South Asia, the species is protected under Schedule II of the Indian Wildlife (Protection) Act, though not listed in CITES. It has been recorded from Namdapha National Park in Arunachal Pradesh, India. It is present in a number of protected areas in Southeast Asia.

== Behavior ==
In one study using camera traps, it was found that the porcupine typically hunts at night, with a single activity peak during the three-hour period before midnight. To avoid predators (such as Asian golden cats, cloud cats, leopard cats, and clouded leopards) on nights when the moon is full, foraging activity is limited to dawn and dusk.
