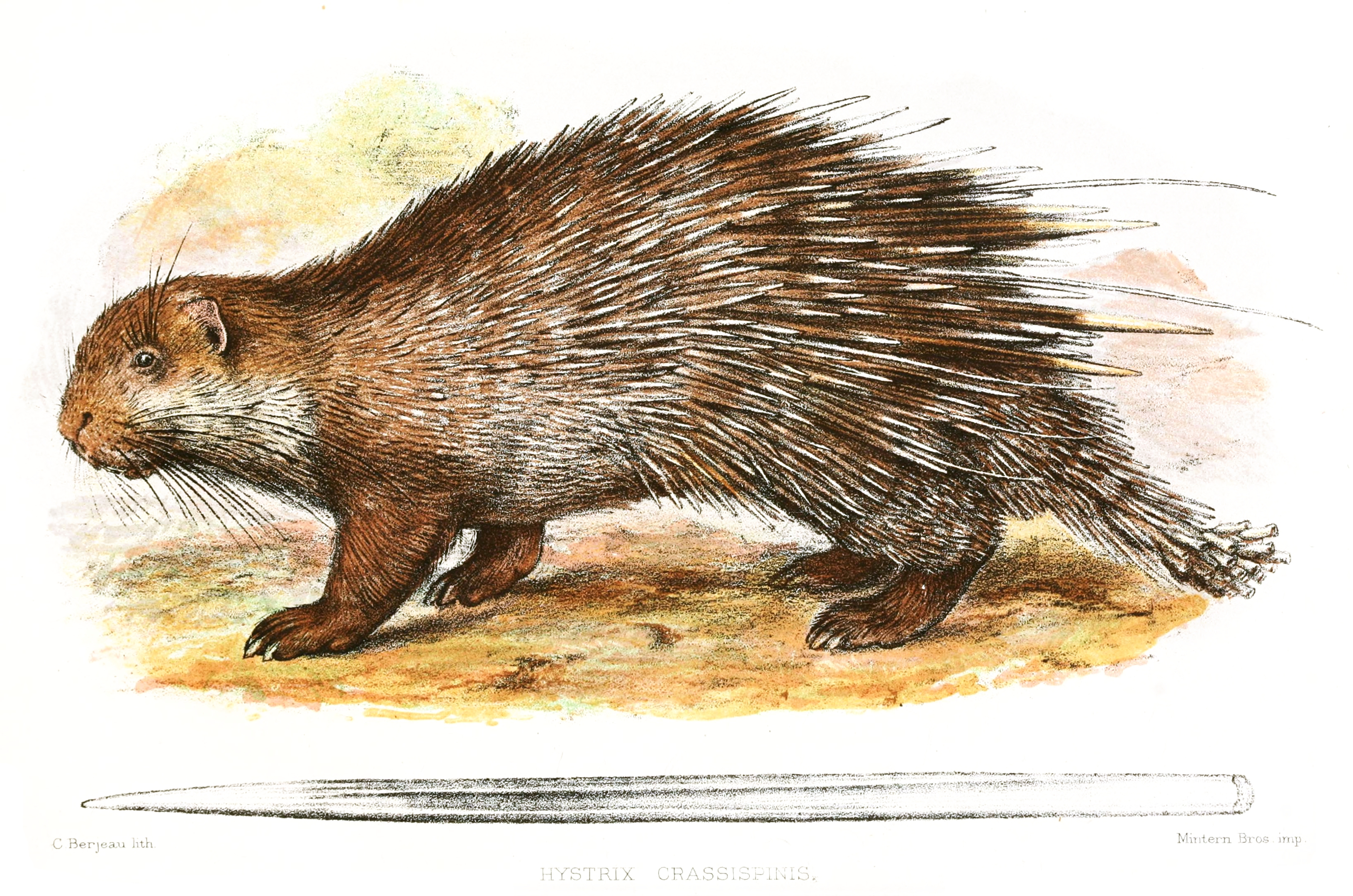

Conservation status
- Least Concern (IUCN 3.1)

Scientific classification
- Kingdom: Animalia
- Phylum: Chordata
- Class: Mammalia
- Order: Rodentia
- Family: Hystricidae
- Genus: Hystrix
- Species: H. crassispinis

Binomial name
- Hystrix crassispinis (Günther, 1877)
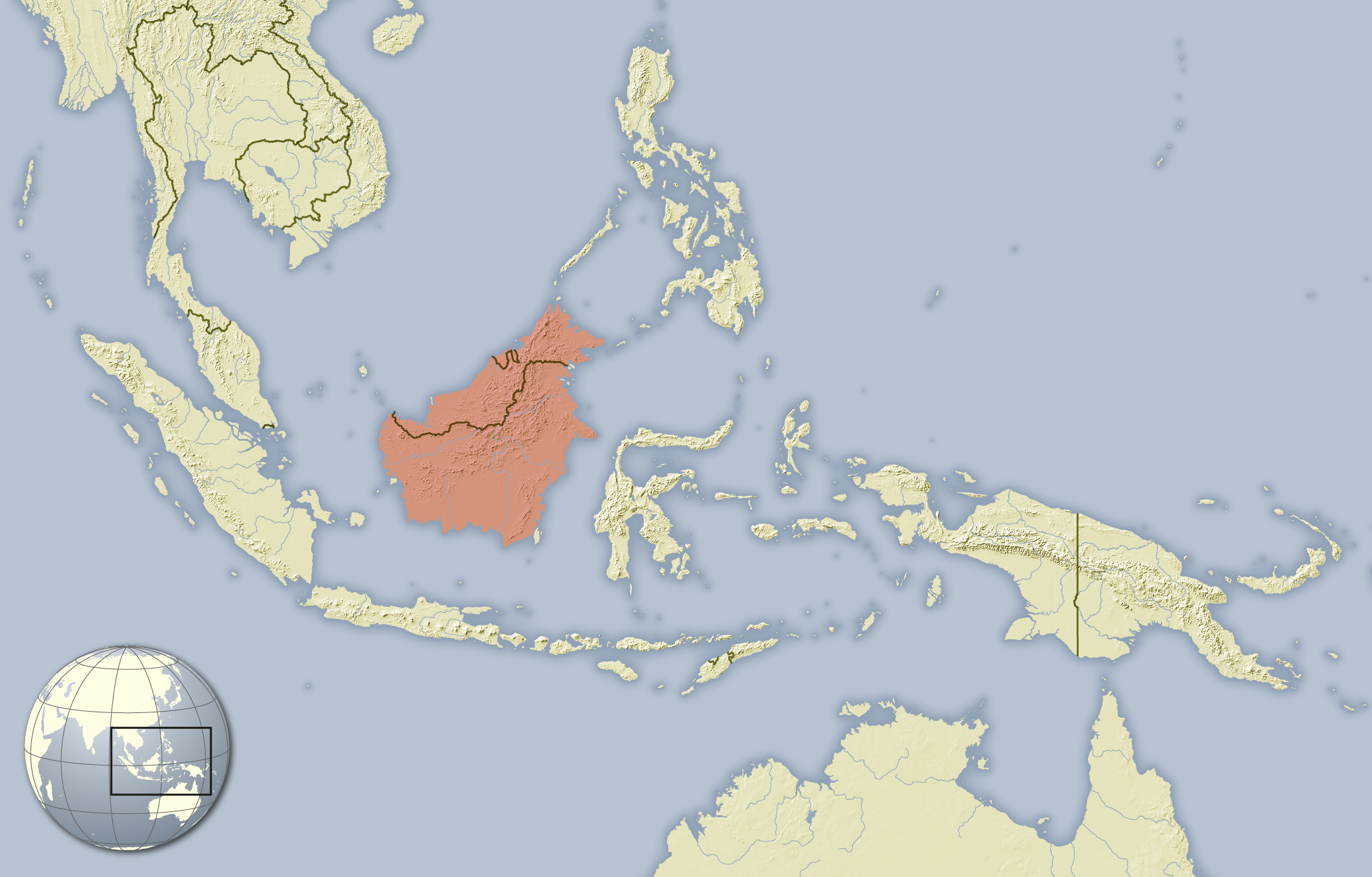

= Thick-spined porcupine =

Species of rodent

The thick-spined porcupine (Hystrix crassispinis) is a species of rodent in the family Hystricidae. It is endemic to the island of Borneo and found in Brunei, Indonesia, and Malaysia.

== History ==
In 1996, the species was considered Near Threatened, but in 2008, this was lowered to Least Concern.

== Distribution ==
It is found in a wide variety of habitats ranging from natural forest to agricultural areas, with an elevation distribution of sea level to at least 1,200 m (3,900 ft).

== Threats ==
Although this porcupine is hunted for food, it is not a concern due to its wide distribution and high tolerance for habitat changes.
