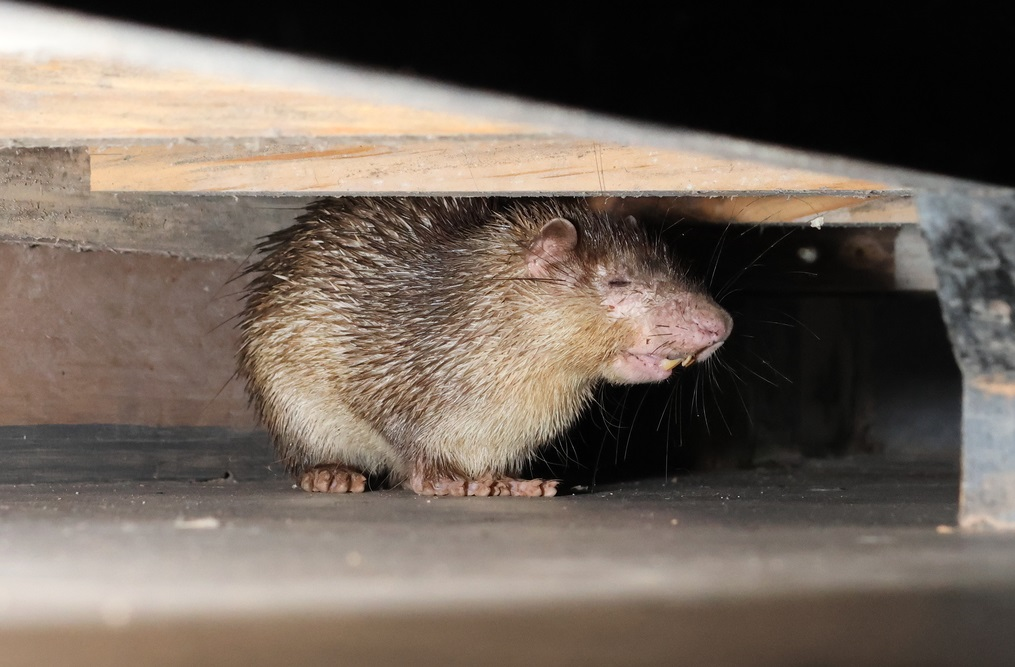
- Keningau, Malaysia

Conservation status
- Least Concern (IUCN 3.1)

Scientific classification
- Kingdom: Animalia
- Phylum: Chordata
- Class: Mammalia
- Order: Rodentia
- Family: Hystricidae
- Genus: Trichys; Günther, 1877
- Species: T. fasciculata

Binomial name
- Trichys fasciculata (Shaw, 1801)
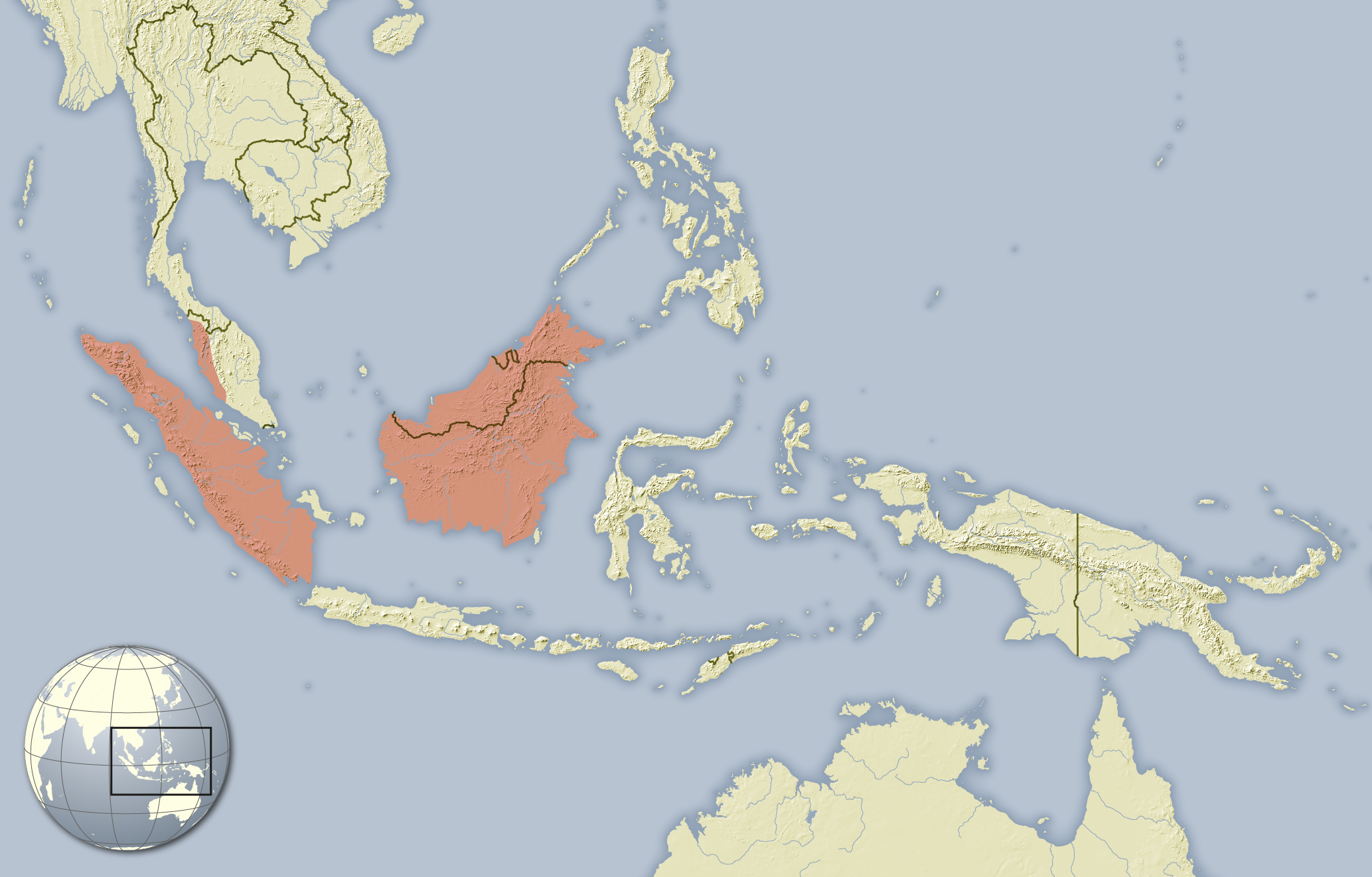

= Long-tailed porcupine =

Long-tailed porcupine Temporal range: Middle Pleistocene – Recent

Species of rodent

The long-tailed porcupine (Trichys fasciculata) is a species of rodent in the family Hystricidae found in Brunei, Indonesia, and Malaysia. It is the only species in the genus Trichys.

It is a brown, rat-like animal covered in bristles except for its head and underneath its body. Its long tail can fall off when grabbed by predators, but does not regenerate.

== Description ==
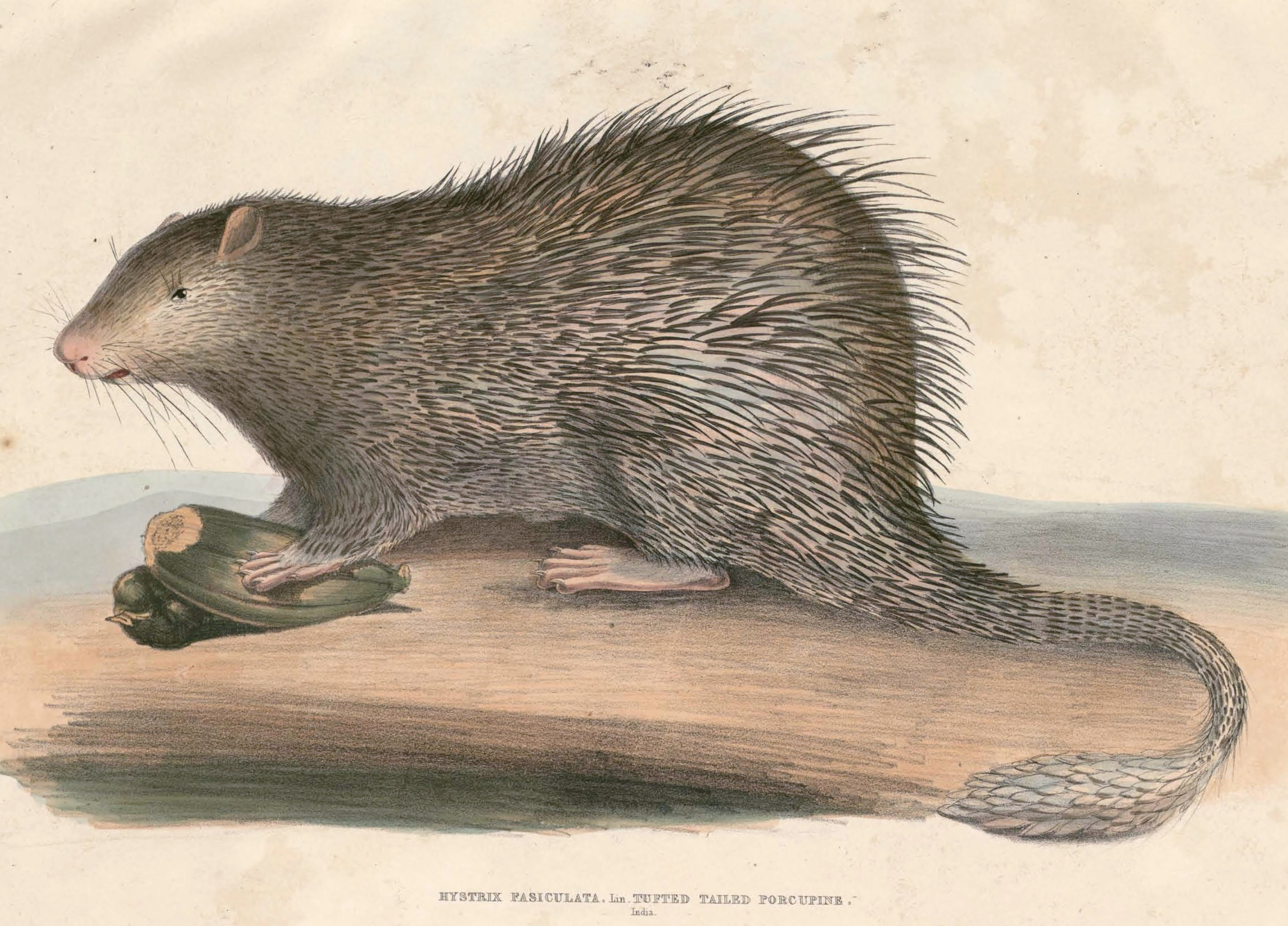
Illustration of the long-tailed porcupine by Thomas Hardwicke, 1833-1834

Long-tailed porcupines' appearances are somewhat rat-like, commonly being black or brown in colour with a typically white underside. The short dark brown flattened spines with white base cover their entire body with bristle-like hair in between, except their head and underside, which are covered entirely with hair. Their spines are shorter than 5 cm (2.0 in), the shortest among the Old World porcupines. Long-tailed porcupines' tails are brown in colour and are mostly covered with scales. The tips of the tail, their rear and the hindquarters are covered in brush-like hollow quills which do not produce sound when shaken, unlike those of other porcupine species.

Their weight is usually around 1.7–2.3 kg (3.7–5.1 lb) but can be as small as 1.5 kg (3.3 lb) and their length can be between 27.9 and 48 cm (11.0 and 18.9 in) excluding their tail which is usually up to 24 cm (9.4 in). To save themselves from predators including larger mammals, snakes, and birds, their tails can be lost when grabbed (through autotomy) but does not regenerate. Long-tailed porcupine's broad paws, with four toes on the forefeet and five on the back, allow them to be good climbers, hence they are able to climb trees and shrubs to search for food.

== Diet ==
Long-tailed porcupines are primarily herbivores, consuming foliage (folivory) and wood (lignivory), primarily consuming leaves, wood, roots, bark and cambium layers, fruits, seeds, and bamboo shoots. They may occasionally consume invertebrates such as insects and other terrestrial arthropods.

Long-tailed porcupine helps in seed dispersal as they are food hoarders who collect fruits and seeds. Additionally, they feed on the cambium layer, causing the death of the trees through girdling which contributes both negatively and positively, positive being that the dead trees create habitats for some bird species. To humans, they are considered pests as they destroy crops such as pineapple.
