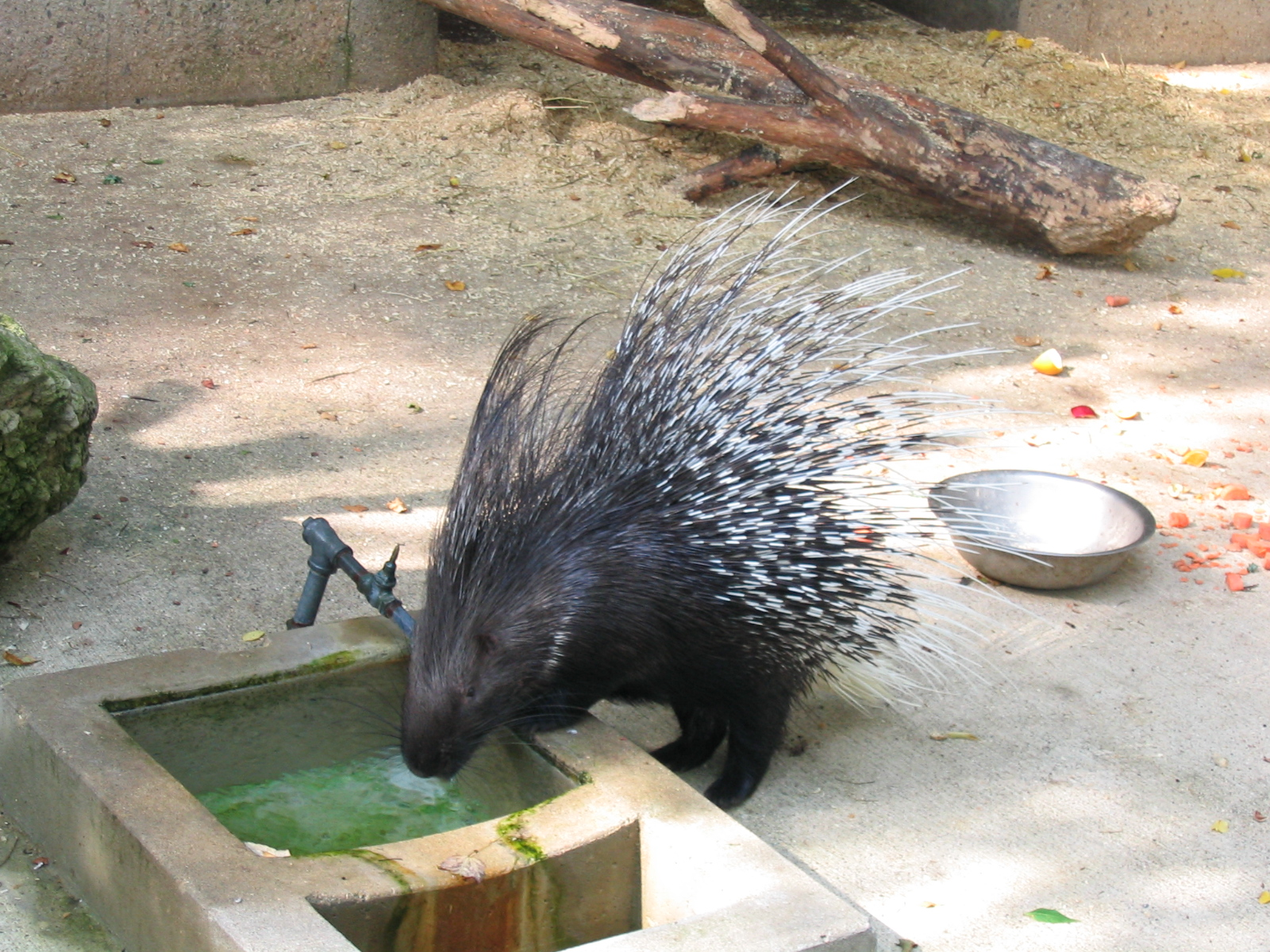
- Hystrix indica (Henry Vilas Zoo, Madison, Wisconsin)

Scientific classification
- Kingdom: Animalia
- Phylum: Chordata
- Class: Mammalia
- Order: Rodentia
- Family: Hystricidae
- Genus: Hystrix; Linnaeus, 1758

Type species
- Hystrix cristata Linnaeus, 1758

Species
- Hystrix africaeaustralis Hystrix brachyura Hystrix crassispinis Hystrix cristata Hystrix indica Hystrix javanica Hystrix pumila Hystrix sumatrae
- Distribution of Old World porcupines

= Hystrix (mammal) =

Hystrix Temporal range: Early Miocene - Recent

Genus of rodents

Hystrix is a genus of porcupines containing most of the Old World porcupines. Fossils belonging to the genus date back to the late Miocene of Africa.

The name Hystrix (from Ancient Greek ὕστριξ (hústrix, “porcupine”) was chosen by the 18th-century Swedish botanist Carl Linnaeus.

== Species ==
- Genus Hystrix
  - Subgenus Hystrix
    - Hystrix africaeaustralis - Cape porcupine
    - Hystrix cristata - African crested porcupine
    - Hystrix indica - Indian crested porcupine
  - Subgenus Acanthion
    - Hystrix brachyura - Malayan porcupine or Himalayan crestless porcupine
    - Hystrix javanica - Sunda porcupine
  - Subgenus Thecurus
    - Hystrix crassispinis - thick-spined porcupine
    - Hystrix pumila - Philippine porcupine
    - Hystrix sumatrae - Sumatran porcupine

=== Fossil species ===
- †Hystrix arayanensis - Late Miocene
- †Hystrix depereti - Pliocene
- †Hystrix kayae - Late Miocene
- †Hystrix leucurus - Pleistocene
- †Hystrix makapanensis - Late Pliocene-Early Pleistocene
- †Hystrix paukensis - Late Miocene-Pliocene
- †Hystrix primigenia - Late Miocene-Pliocene
- †Hystrix refossa - Pleistocene
- †Hystrix suevica - Late Miocene
- †Hystrix velunensis - Pliocene
