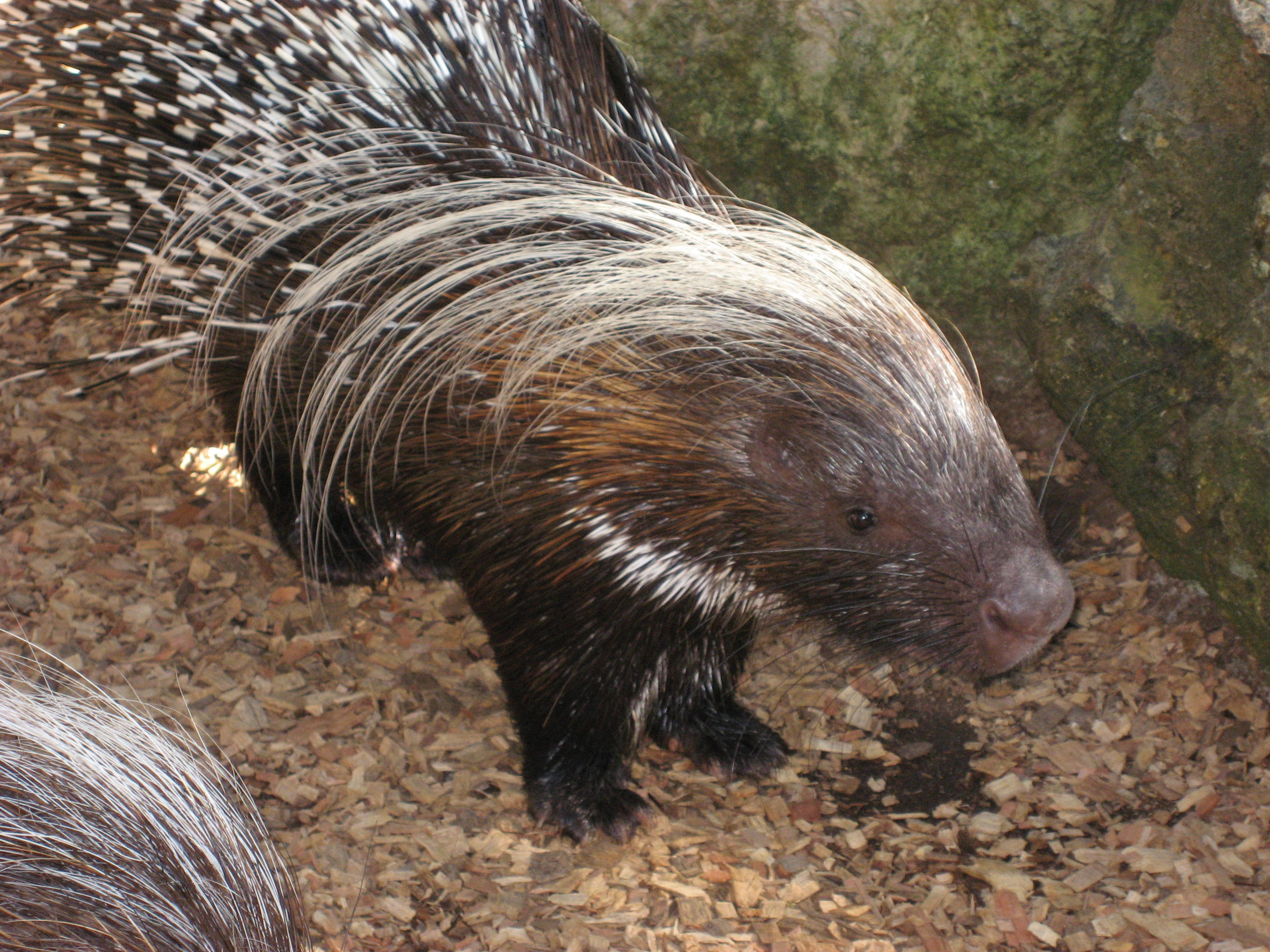
- Old World porcupine

Scientific classification
- Kingdom: Animalia
- Phylum: Chordata
- Class: Mammalia
- Infraclass: Placentalia
- Order: Rodentia
- Infraorder: Hystricognathi
- Family: Hystricidae; Fischer de Waldheim, 1817

Type genus
- Hystrix Linnaeus, 1758

Genera
- Hystrix; Atherurus; Trichys

= Old World porcupine =

Old World porcupines Temporal range: Miocene – recent

Family of rodents

Hystricidae distribution

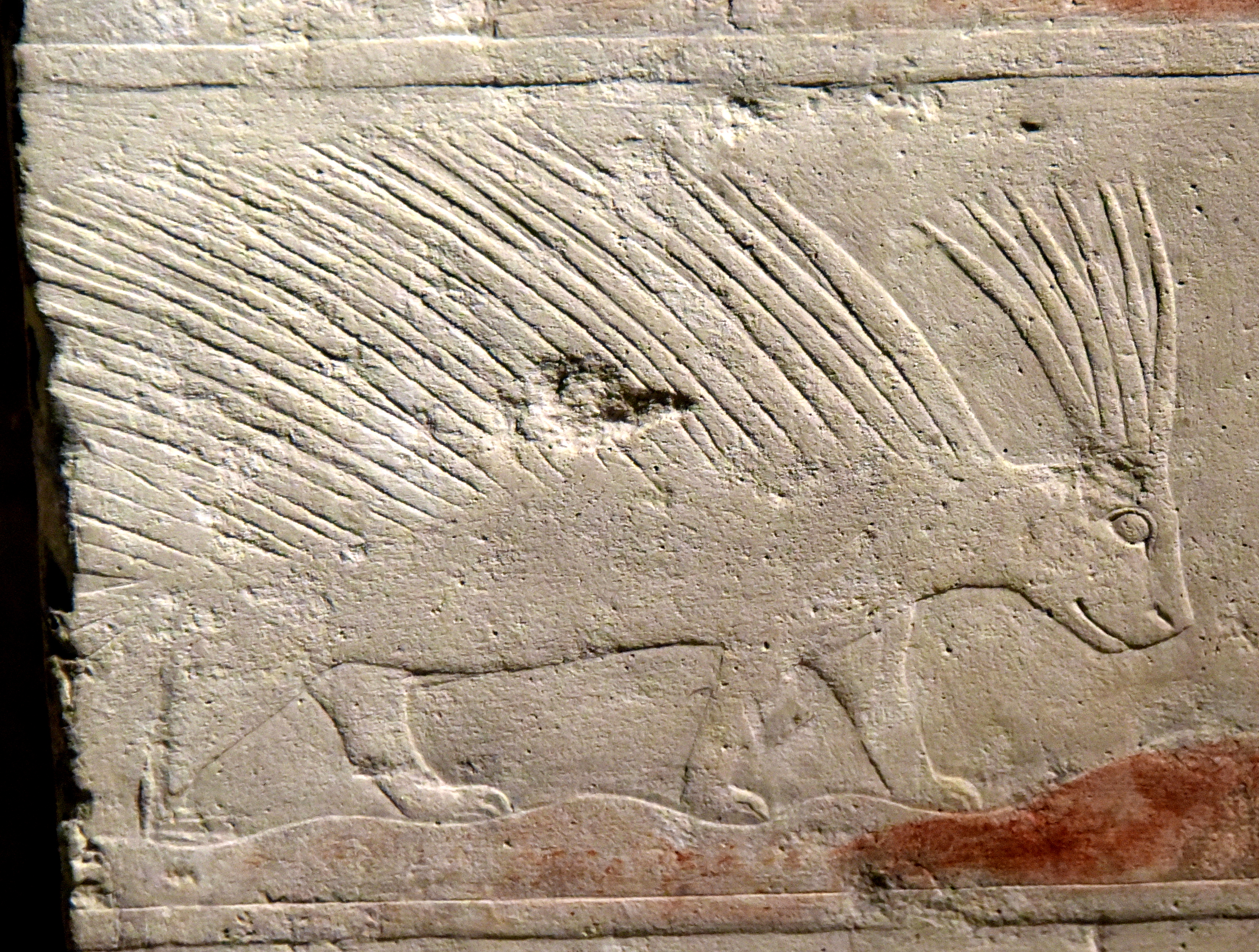
Relief of a porcupine in an Egyptian desert, detail of a wall fragment from the grave of Pehenuikai at Saqqara, Egypt, Old Kingdom, 5th Dynasty, c. 2500 BCE. Neues Museum, Berlin

The Old World porcupines, or Hystricidae, are large terrestrial rodents, distinguished by the spiny covering from which they take their name. They range over Southern Europe (Italy) and the Levant, most of Africa, South Asia, and Southeast Asia as far east as Flores. Although both the Old World and New World porcupine families belong to the infraorder Hystricognathi of the vast order Rodentia, they are quite different and are not particularly closely related.

== Characteristics ==
Old World porcupines are stout, heavily built animals, with blunt, rounded heads, fleshy, mobile snouts, and coats of thick cylindrical or flattened spines, which form the whole covering of their bodies, and are not intermingled with ordinary hairs. The habits of most species are strictly terrestrial. They vary in size from the relatively small long–tailed porcupine with body lengths of 27.9 to 48 cm (11.0 to 18.9 in), and a weight of 1.5 to 2.3 kg (3.3 to 5.1 lb), to the much larger crested porcupines, which are 60 to 83 cm (24 to 33 in) long, discounting the tail, and weigh from 13 to 27 kg (29 to 60 lb).

The various species are typically herbivorous, eating fruit, roots, and bulbs. Some species also gnaw on dry bones, perhaps as a source of calcium. Like other rodents, they have powerful gnawing incisors, and no canine teeth. Their dental formula is 1.0.1.31.0.1.3. The prominent diastema allows the lips to be drawn inwards while gnawing. Similar to other hystricomorphs, their chewing muscles are unique. Through an arm of the masseter muscles, passing through the infraorbital foramen, chewing movements are very efficient.

One or two (or, rarely, three) young are born after a gestation period between 90 and 112 days, depending on the species. Females typically give birth only once a year, in a grass-lined underground chamber within a burrow system. The young are born more or less fully developed, and the spines, which are initially soft, harden within a few hours of birth. Although they begin to take solid food within two weeks, they are not fully weaned until 13 to 19 weeks after birth. The young remain with the colony until they reach sexual maturity at around two years of age, and share the burrow system with their parents and siblings from other litters. Males, in particular, help defend the colony from intruders, although both sexes are aggressive towards unrelated porcupines.

These rodents are also characterized by the imperfectly rooted cheek-teeth, imperfect clavicles or collar-bones, cleft upper lip, rudimentary first front-toes, smooth soles, six teats arranged on the side of the body, and many cranial characters.

== Species ==
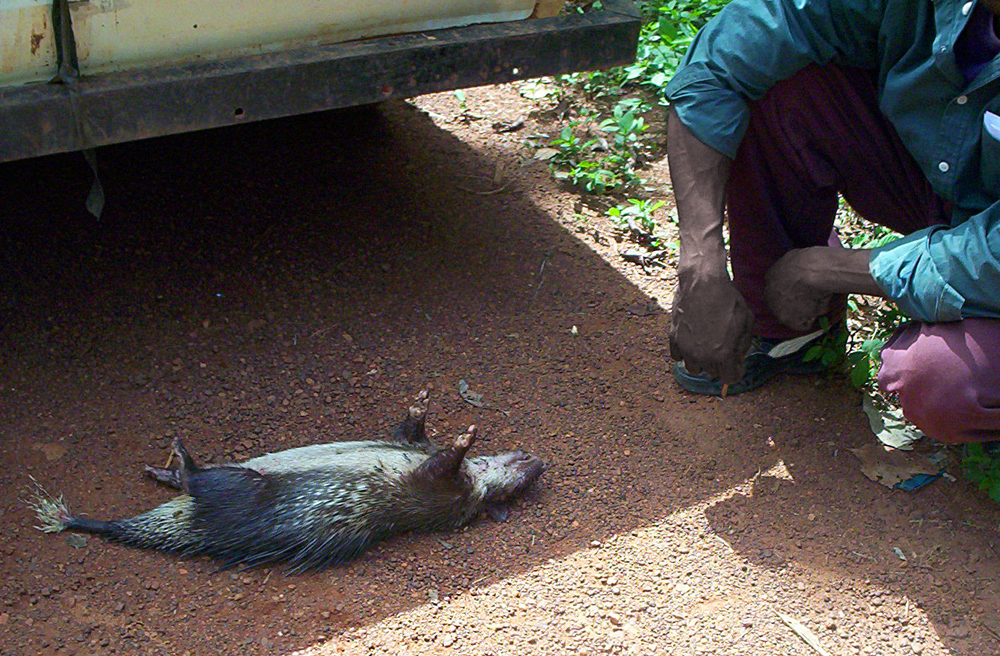
African brush-tailed porcupine sold for meat in Cameroon

Of the three genera, Hystrix is characterized by an inflated skull, in which the nasal cavity is often considerably larger than the brain case, and a short tail, tipped with numerous slender-stalked open quills, which make a rattling noise whenever the animal moves. When threatened, most porcupines will wag their tails, making a louder rattling noise to scare off predators. The African brush-tailed porcupine (Atherurus africanus) will simultaneously raise sharp quills, 40 cm (16 inches) in length, on its back and sides.

The crested porcupine (Hystrix cristata), a typical representative of the Old World porcupines, occurs throughout the south of Europe and North and West Africa. It is replaced in southern and central Africa by the Cape porcupine, H. africaeaustralis, and in India by the Malayan porcupine (H. brachyura) and Indian (crested) porcupine (H. indica). The latter also lives throughout the Middle East.

Besides these large-crested species, several smaller species without crests occur in northeast India, and the Malay region from Nepal to Borneo.

The genus Atherurus includes the brush-tailed porcupines which are much smaller animals, with long tails tipped with bundles of flattened spines. One species is found in the Malay region and one in Central and West Africa. The latter species, the African brush-tailed porcupine, is often hunted for its meat.

Trichys, the last genus, contains one species, the long-tailed porcupine (T. fasciculata) of Borneo. This species is externally very similar to Atherurus, but differs from the members of that genus in many cranial characteristics.

Fossil species are also known from Africa and Eurasia, with one of the oldest being Sivacanthion from the Miocene of present-day Pakistan. However, it was probably not a direct ancestor of modern porcupines.

=== Species list ===
The extant species and fossil genera are:

- Family Hystricidae
  - Hystrix
    - Subgenus Acanthion
      - Malayan porcupine (H. brachyura)
      - Sunda porcupine (H. javanica)
    - Subgenus Hystrix
      - Cape porcupine (H. africaeaustralis)
      - Crested porcupine (H. cristata)
      - Indian porcupine (H. indica)
    - Subgenus Thecurus
      - Thick-spined porcupine (H. crassispinis)
      - Philippine porcupine (H. pumila)
      - Sumatran porcupine (H. sumatrae)
    - †Hystrix arayanensis
    - †Hystrix depereti
    - †Hystrix paukensis
    - †Hystrix primigenia
    - †Hystrix refossa
  - †Miohystrix
  - †Xenohystrix
  - †Sivacanthion
  - Atherurus
    - African brush-tailed porcupine (A. africanus)
    - Asiatic brush-tailed porcupine (A. macrourus)
  - Trichys
    - Long-tailed porcupine (T. fasciculata)

== See also ==
- Porcupine
