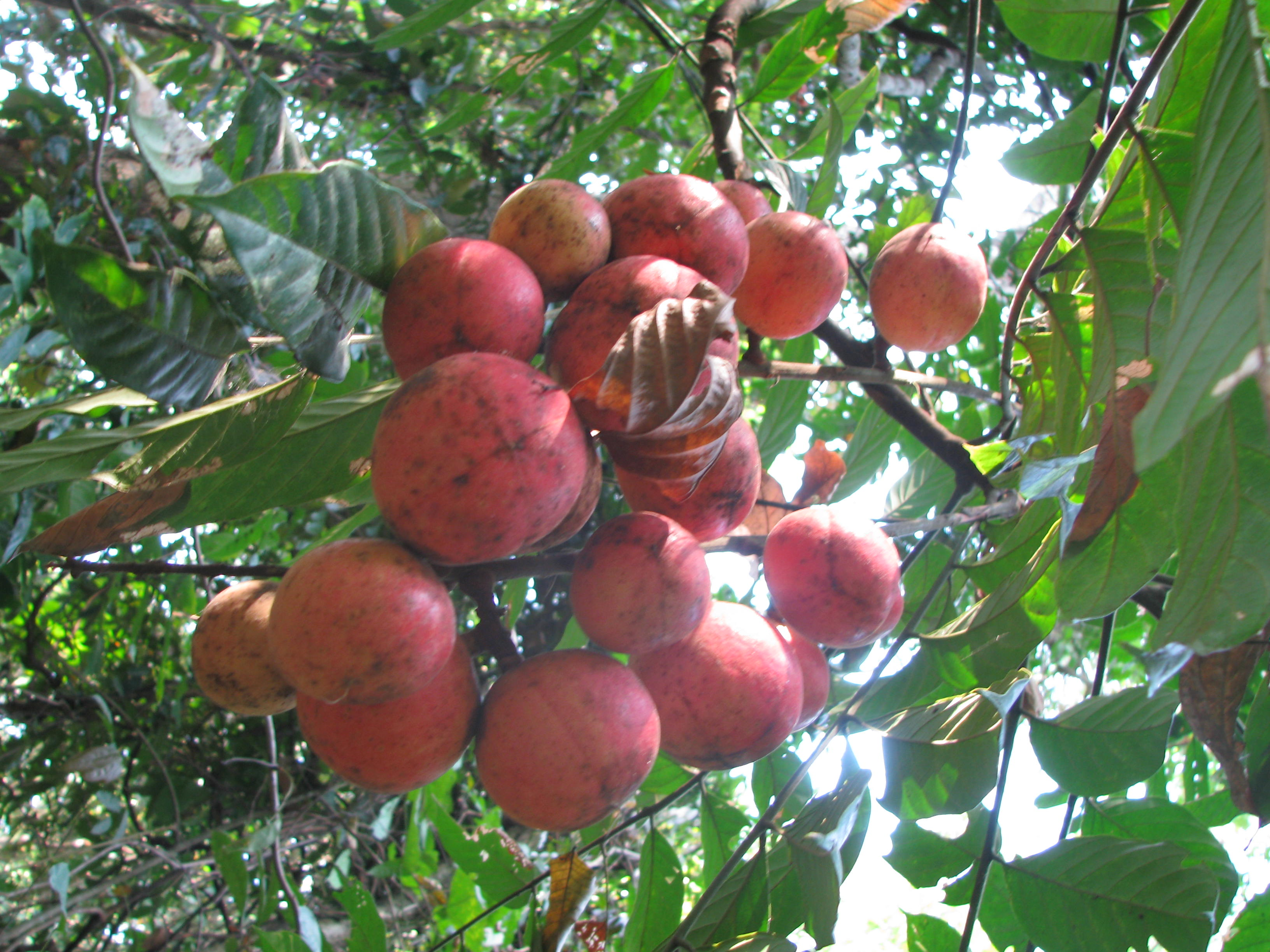
- Fruits

Scientific classification
- Kingdom: Plantae
- Clade: Tracheophytes
- Clade: Angiosperms
- Clade: Eudicots
- Clade: Rosids
- Order: Sapindales
- Family: Meliaceae
- Genus: Chisocheton
- Species: C. cumingianus
- Subspecies: C. c. subsp. balansae

Trinomial name
- Chisocheton cumingianus subsp. balansae (C.DC.) Mabb.

Synonyms
- Chisocheton balansae C.DC.; Chisocheton chinensis Merr.; Chisocheton cochinchinensis Pierre; Chisocheton coriaceus Pierre; Chisocheton harmandianus Pierre; Chisocheton paniculatus Hiern; Chisocheton siamensis Craib; Chisocheton thorelii Pierre; Guarea paniculata Buch.-Ham.; Guarea paniculata Roxb.

= Chisocheton cumingianus subsp. balansae =

Subspecies of tree

Chisocheton cumingianus subsp. balansae is a subspecies of Chisocheton cumingianus. It is a tree in the Meliaceae family. The tree is named for the French botanist Benjamin Balansa. The habitat is tropical forests: C. cumingianus subsp. balansae is found in mainland Asia.
