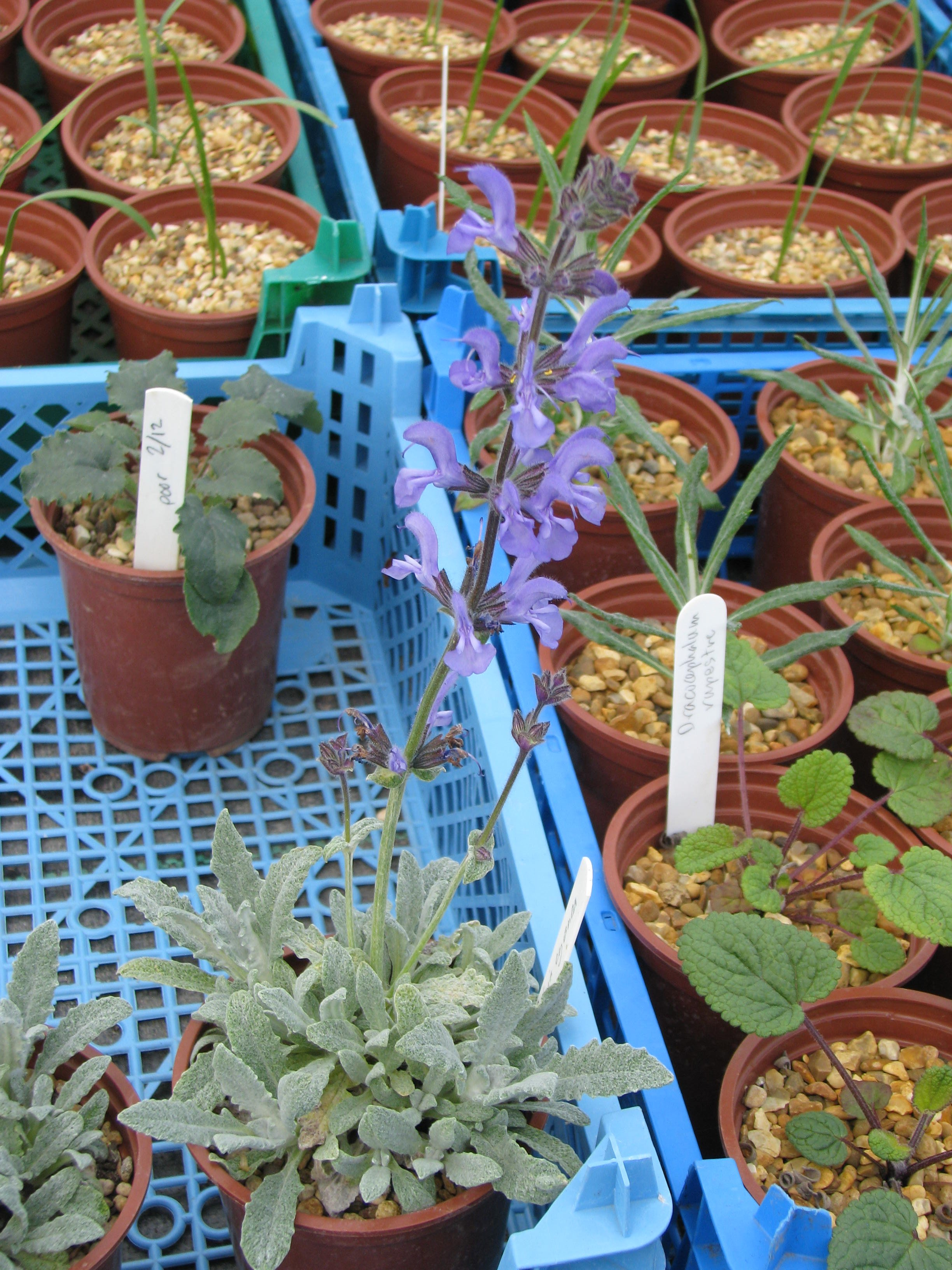

Scientific classification
- Kingdom: Plantae
- Clade: Tracheophytes
- Clade: Angiosperms
- Clade: Eudicots
- Clade: Asterids
- Order: Lamiales
- Family: Lamiaceae
- Genus: Salvia
- Species: S. cyanescens

Binomial name
- Salvia cyanescens Boiss. & Balansa

= Salvia cyanescens =

Species of plant in the mint family

Salvia cyanescens is a perennial shrub in the Lamiaceae family. It is native to Iran and Turkey, and was introduced to horticulture in 1959. It freely hybridizes in its native habitat with Salvia candidissima.

In mild climates it is evergreen, growing into 1 ft (0.3 m) clumps. The gray-green leaves are 2 in long by 1 in wide and covered with hairs. It blooms in summer and late autumn, with delicate 1 in purple-violet flowers growing on 1 ft candelabra-like inflorescences. The epithet, cyanescens, means 'bluish', which is not entirely accurate regarding the flower.
