= Chisocheton cumingianus subsp. kinabaluensis =

Scientific classification
- Kingdom: Plantae
- Clade: Tracheophytes
- Clade: Angiosperms
- Clade: Eudicots
- Clade: Rosids
- Order: Sapindales
- Family: Meliaceae
- Genus: Chisocheton
- Species: C. cumingianus
- Subspecies: C. c. subsp. kinabaluensis

Trinomial name
- Chisocheton cumingianus subsp. kinabaluensis (Merr.) Mabb.

Synonyms
- Chisocheton kinabaluensis Merr.

Subspecies of tree

Chisocheton cumingianus subsp. kinabaluensis is a subspecies of Chisocheton cumingianus. It is a tree in the family Meliaceae. It is named for Mount Kinabalu in Borneo.

== Description ==
Chisocheton cumingianus subsp. kinabaluensis grows up to 37 metres (120 ft) tall with a trunk diameter of up to 50 cm (20 in). The bark is grey-brown. The flowers are pale yellow to white. The orange-red fruits are round to pyriform, up to 7 cm (3 in) in diameter.

== Distribution and habitat ==
Chisocheton cumingianus subsp. kinabaluensis is endemic to Borneo, where it is known only from Mount Kinabalu in Sabah. Its habitat is rain forests.
