= Chisocheton lansiifolius =

Scientific classification
- Kingdom: Plantae
- Clade: Tracheophytes
- Clade: Angiosperms
- Clade: Eudicots
- Clade: Rosids
- Order: Sapindales
- Family: Meliaceae
- Genus: Chisocheton
- Species: C. lansiifolius

Binomial name
- Chisocheton lansiifolius Mabb.

Species of tree

Chisocheton lansiifolius is a tree in the family Meliaceae. The specific epithet lansiifolius is from the Latin, meaning leaves resembling those of the genus Lansium, specifically Lansium parasiticum.

== Description ==
The tree grows up to 30 metres (100 ft) tall with a trunk diameter of up to 25 centimetres (10 in). The bark is dark brown. The flowers are creamy-white to pinkish. Fruits are red, roundish, up to 7 cm (3 in) in diameter.

== Distribution and habitat ==
Chisocheton lansiifolius is endemic to Borneo. Its habitat is rain forests, including peatswamp forests, from sea-level to 1,050 metres (3,000 ft) altitude.
