= Ceratocnemum =

Scientific classification
- Kingdom: Plantae
- Clade: Tracheophytes
- Clade: Angiosperms
- Clade: Eudicots
- Clade: Rosids
- Order: Brassicales
- Family: Brassicaceae
- Genus: Ceratocnemum; Coss. & Balansa

Synonyms
- Pantorrhynchus Murb.; × Trachycnemum Maire & Sam.; Trachystoma O.E.Schulz

Genus of flowering plants

Ceratocnemum is a genus of flowering plants belonging to the family Brassicaceae. It includes four species endemic to Morocco.

- Ceratocnemum aphanoneurum (Maire & Weiller) Al-Shehbaz
- Ceratocnemum ballii (O.E.Schulz) Al-Shehbaz
- Ceratocnemum × mirabile (Maire & Sam.) D.A.German
- Ceratocnemum rapistroides Coss. & Balansa
