= Chisocheton granatum =

Scientific classification
- Kingdom: Plantae
- Clade: Tracheophytes
- Clade: Angiosperms
- Clade: Eudicots
- Clade: Rosids
- Order: Sapindales
- Family: Meliaceae
- Genus: Chisocheton
- Species: C. granatum

Binomial name
- Chisocheton granatum Mabb.

Species of tree

Chisocheton granatum is a tree in the family Meliaceae. The specific epithet granatum is from the Latin meaning 'pomegranate', referring to the shape of the fruit.

== Description ==
The tree grows up to 15 metres (50 ft) tall with a trunk diameter of up to 17 centimetres (7 in). The bark is pale. The flowers are creamy-white. Fruits are roundish, red-brown, up to 9 cm (4 in) in diameter.

== Distribution and habitat ==
Chisocheton granatum is endemic to Borneo. Its habitat is hill forests from 900 metres (3,000 ft) to 1,500 metres (5,000 ft) altitude.
