= Chisocheton tomentosus =

Conservation status
- Least Concern (IUCN 3.1)

Scientific classification
- Kingdom: Plantae
- Clade: Tracheophytes
- Clade: Angiosperms
- Clade: Eudicots
- Clade: Rosids
- Order: Sapindales
- Family: Meliaceae
- Genus: Chisocheton
- Species: C. tomentosus

Binomial name
- Chisocheton tomentosus (Roxb.) Mabb.

Species of tree

Chisocheton tomentosum is a rainforest tree of the Malay Peninsula and Sumatra belonging to the family Meliaceae. It grows in lowland and hill dipterocarp forests.

== Description ==
Chisocheton tomentosum is a rarely branching, pachycaulous tree up to 21 metres (69 ft) in height, but rarely exceeding 20 cm (7.9 in) diameter at breast height (DBH). It is myrmecophilic, with a symbiotic relationship with certain species of ants. The once-pinnate, indeterminate leaf blades (laminae) are up to 2 m (6 ft 7 in) in length in rosettes at the top of the trunk and the few vertical branches (reiterations), with additionally a stalk (petiole) to 20 cm (7.9 in) long. It is dioecious, with separate male and female trees.
