= Chisocheton koordersii =

Scientific classification
- Kingdom: Plantae
- Clade: Tracheophytes
- Clade: Angiosperms
- Clade: Eudicots
- Clade: Rosids
- Order: Sapindales
- Family: Meliaceae
- Genus: Chisocheton
- Species: C. koordersii

Binomial name
- Chisocheton koordersii Mabb.

Species of tree

Chisocheton koordersii is a tree in the family Meliaceae. It is named for the Dutch botanist Sijfert Hendrik Koorders.

== Description ==
The tree grows up to 30 metres (100 ft) tall with a trunk diameter of up to 60 centimetres (24 in). The bark is brown. The flowers are white. Fruits are reddish, round, up to 5 cm (2 in) in diameter.

== Distribution and habitat ==
Chisocheton koordersii is found in Borneo and Sulawesi. Its habitat is rain forests from 10 metres (30 ft) to 600 metres (2,000 ft) altitude.
