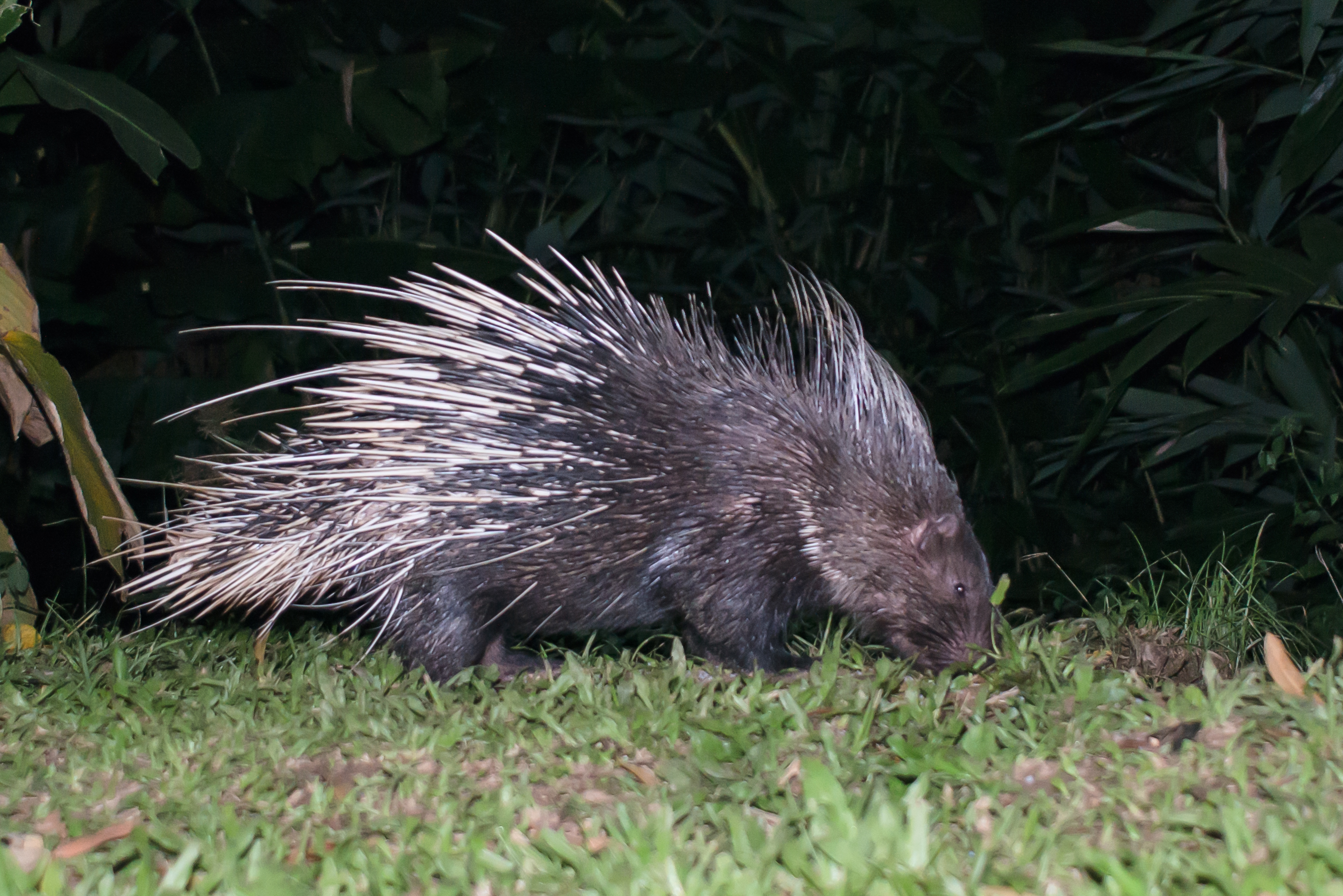
- Malayan porcupine in Kaeng Krachan National Park
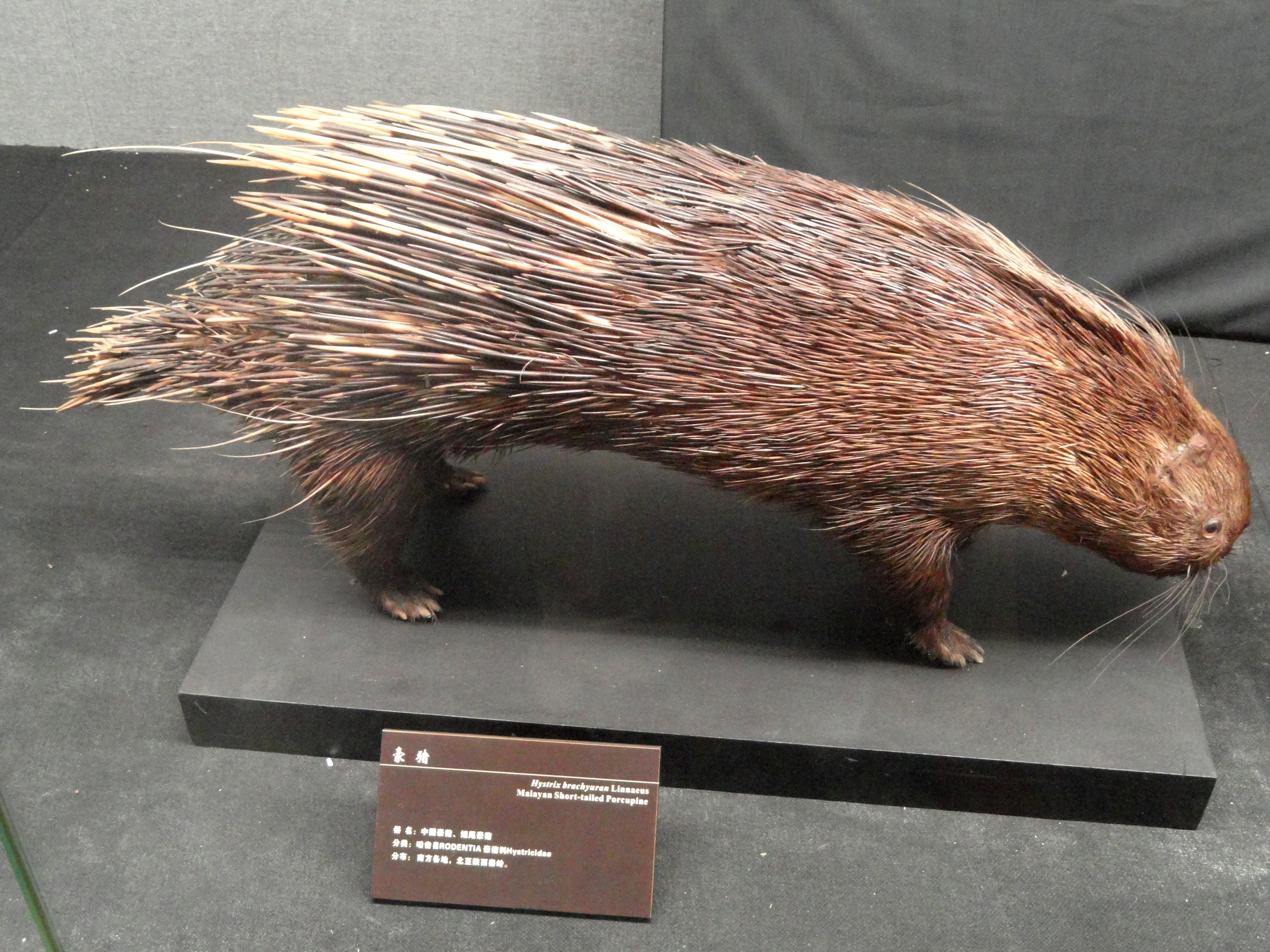
- Stuffed specimen at the Kunming Natural History Museum of Zoology, Kunming, Yunnan, China

Conservation status
- Least Concern (IUCN 3.1)

Scientific classification
- Kingdom: Animalia
- Phylum: Chordata
- Class: Mammalia
- Order: Rodentia
- Family: Hystricidae
- Genus: Hystrix
- Subgenus: Acanthion
- Species: H. brachyura

Binomial name
- Hystrix brachyura Linnaeus, 1758

Subspecies
- H. b. brachyura H. b. subcristata H. b. hodgsoni †H. b. punungensis H. b. yunnanensis Anderson, 1878; H. b. bengalensis Blyth, 1851

= Malayan porcupine =

Species of rodent

The Malayan porcupine or Himalayan porcupine (Hystrix brachyura) is a species of rodent in the family Hystricidae. Three subspecies are extant in South and Southeast Asia.

== Characteristics ==
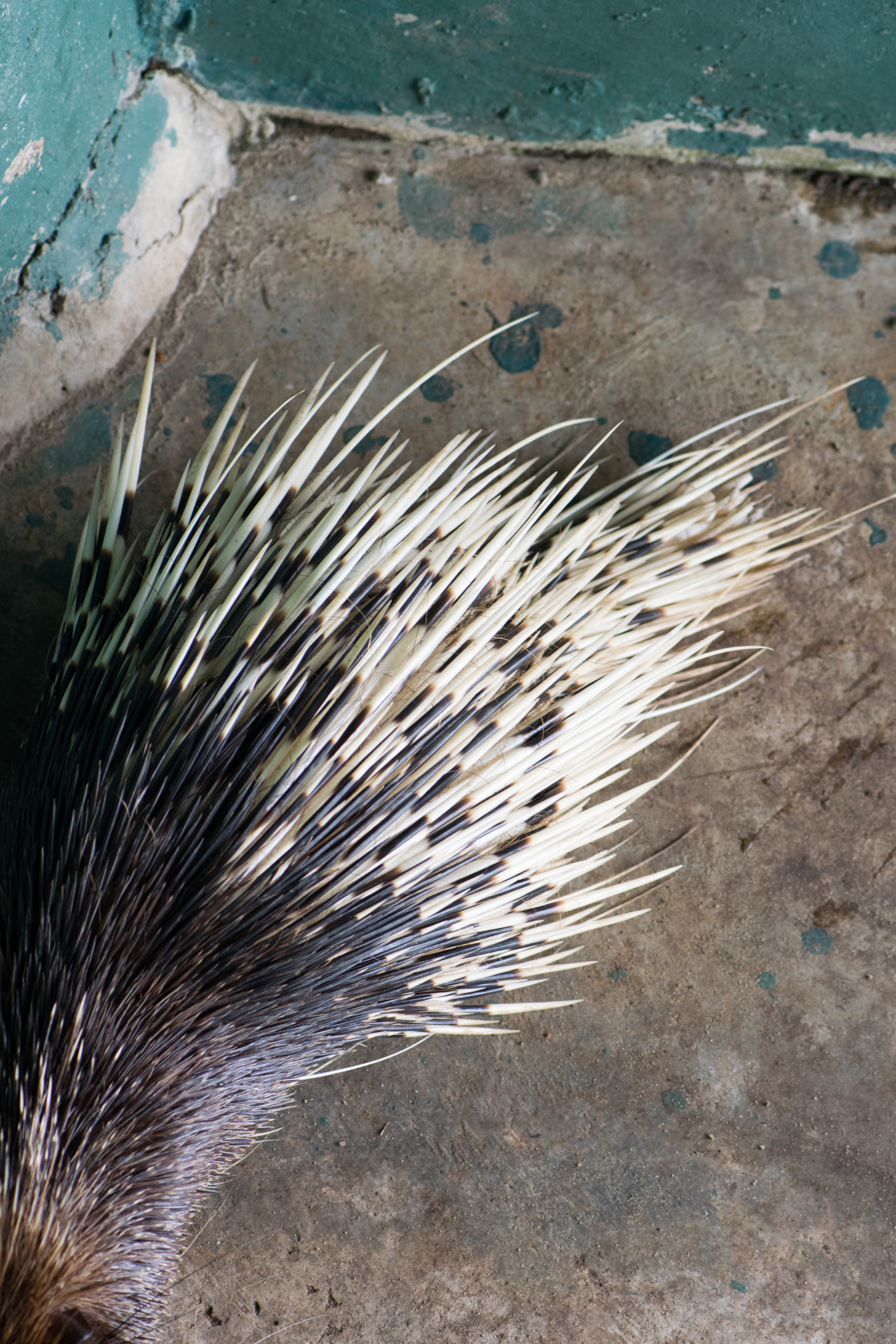
Spines of a malayan porcupine

The Malayan porcupine is a large and stout-bodied rodent covered with quills, which are sharp, rigid structures. The quills are modified hairs. Those on their upper body parts are rough with black with white or yellow stripes. The young's soft quills become hard as they enter adulthood. The porcupine has short, stocky legs covered in brown hairs; there are four claws on the front and five on the hind legs. Both front and hind paws have smooth soles. The head and body are around 56–74 cm long and the tail is about 6–11 cm. The animal weighs around 10–18 kg.

== Distribution and habitat ==
Malayan porcupine in Kaeng Krachan National Park

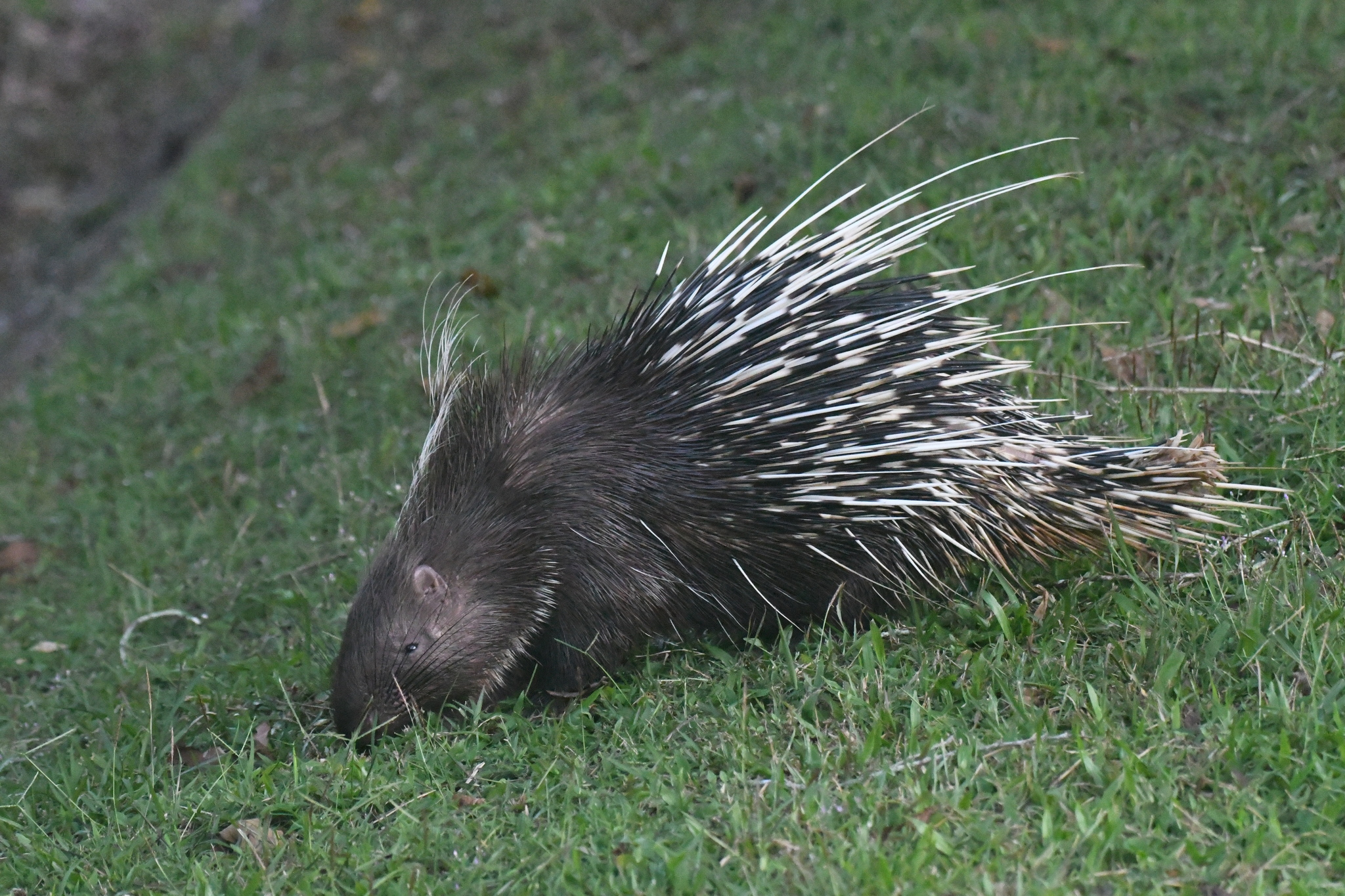
In Thailand

The Malayan porcupine ranges from Nepal through north-east India (Arunachal Pradesh, Sikkim, West Bengal, Manipur, Mizoram, Meghalaya and Nagaland), to Bangladesh, central and southern China (Xizang, Hainan, Yunnan, Sichuan, Chongqing, Guizhou, Hunnan, Guangxi, Guangdong, Hong Kong, Fujian, Jianxi, Zhejiang, Shanghai, Jiangsu, Anhui, Henan, Hubei, Shaanxi, Gansu), throughout Myanmar, Thailand, Laos, Cambodia and Vietnam, through Peninsular Malaysia, to Singapore, Sumatra (Indonesia) and throughout Borneo (Indonesia, Malaysia, Sarawak and Brunei). It is also present on the island of Penang, Malaysia. It can be found from sea level to at least 1,300 m above sea level. It inhabits various types of forests and open areas near forests; as well as straying into nearby agricultural areas.

According to a 2020 study that sequenced partial mitochondrial 12S rRNA and cytochrome b genes from late Pleistocene porcupine fossils found in northern China, the Malayan porcupine may be closely related to the extinct species Hystrix subcristata. The analysis supports a possible range contraction or local extinction in the northern regions that led to the continued evolution and development of Hystrix populations in southern regions.

== Behaviour and ecology ==
The Malayan porcupine is terrestrial and usually lives in small groups. They often inhabit dens they have found near rocky areas or in the holes of trees or root systems. They may also dig out and live in burrows, from which a network of trails penetrate into surrounding habitat. They can be found in all forest types up to 1500 m altitude.

The Malayan porcupine forages at night and rests during the day. It may live singly or in pairs. It can swim and gnaw. The sow usually delivers a single pup at a time, but delivering two pups has also been recorded. The gestation period is about 90 to 112 days. Their maximum longevity is about 27 years.

== Diet ==
A captive malayan porcupine eating a sweet potato in Khao Sok, Chon Buri, Thailand

They normally feed on roots, tubers, bark and fallen fruits. They also eat carrion, insects, and large tropical seeds such as those of Chisocheton cumingianus.

== Conservation ==
The Malayan porcupine has been categorized as Least Concern on the IUCN Red List.

== Sources ==
- I Dahlan, AA Salam, BS Amin, A Osman. (1995). Preference and Intake of Feedstuff by Crested Porcupines(Hystrix Brachyura) in Captivity. Ann Zootech 44, 271.
- Vaughan, T. A. (1985). Family Hystricidae. In T. A. Vaughan, Mammalogy Third Edition (pp. 266–267). Arizona: Saunders College Publishing.
