= Chisocheton maxilla-pisticis =

Scientific classification
- Kingdom: Plantae
- Clade: Tracheophytes
- Clade: Angiosperms
- Clade: Eudicots
- Clade: Rosids
- Order: Sapindales
- Family: Meliaceae
- Genus: Chisocheton
- Species: C. maxilla-pisticis

Binomial name
- Chisocheton maxilla-pisticis Mabb.

Species of tree

Chisocheton maxilla-pisticis is a tree in the family Meliaceae. The specific epithet maxilla-pisticis is from the Latin meaning 'shark jaw', referring to the shape of the young leaves.

== Description ==
The tree grows up to 45 metres (150 ft) tall with a trunk diameter of up to 90 centimetres (35 in). Fruits are red-brown, round, up to 9 cm (4 in) in diameter.

== Distribution and habitat ==
Chisocheton maxilla-pisticis is found in Borneo and the Philippines. Its habitat is lowland rain forest.
