= Chisocheton crustularii =

Scientific classification
- Kingdom: Plantae
- Clade: Tracheophytes
- Clade: Angiosperms
- Clade: Eudicots
- Clade: Rosids
- Order: Sapindales
- Family: Meliaceae
- Genus: Chisocheton
- Species: C. crustularii

Binomial name
- Chisocheton crustularii Mabb.

Species of tree

Chisocheton crustularii is a tree in the family Meliaceae. It grows up to 8 metres (30 ft) tall with a trunk diameter of up to 8 centimetres (3 in). The bark is greyish. The flowers are white. The specific epithet crustularii is from the Latin meaning 'pastry maker', referring to the tart-shaped flower disc. Habitat is rain forest. C. crustularii is endemic to Borneo and known only from Sarawak.
