= Chisocheton pentandrus subsp. paucijugus =

Scientific classification
- Kingdom: Plantae
- Clade: Tracheophytes
- Clade: Angiosperms
- Clade: Eudicots
- Clade: Rosids
- Order: Sapindales
- Family: Meliaceae
- Genus: Chisocheton
- Species: C. pentandrus
- Subspecies: C. p. subsp. paucijugus

Trinomial name
- Chisocheton pentandrus subsp. paucijugus (Miq.) Mabb.

Synonyms
- Chisocheton beccarianus (Baill.) Harms; Chisocheton paucijugus Miq.; Chisocheton spicatus Hiern; Dasycoleum beccarianum Baill.

Subspecies of tree

Chisocheton pentandrus subsp. paucijugus is a subspecies of Chisocheton pentandrus. It is a tree in the Meliaceae family. The specific epithet paucijugus is from the Latin meaning 'few yokes', referring to the few leaflets.

== Description ==
The tree grows up to 8 metres (30 ft) tall. The fruits taper at each end.

== Distribution and habitat ==
Chisocheton pentandrus is found in Thailand and Malesia. Its habitat is wetter forests.
