= Chisocheton velutinus =

Scientific classification
- Kingdom: Plantae
- Clade: Tracheophytes
- Clade: Angiosperms
- Clade: Eudicots
- Clade: Rosids
- Order: Sapindales
- Family: Meliaceae
- Genus: Chisocheton
- Species: C. velutinus

Binomial name
- Chisocheton velutinus Mabb.

Species of tree

Chisocheton velutinus is a tree in the family Meliaceae. The specific epithet velutinus is from the Latin meaning 'velvety', referring to the indumentum of the leaves and fruits.

== Description ==
The tree grows up to 25 metres (80 ft) tall with a trunk diameter of up to 8 centimetres (3 in). The flowers are cream-coloured. The fruits are yellow turning red, round, up to 4 cm (2 in) in diameter.

== Distribution and habitat ==
Chisocheton velutinus is endemic to Borneo. Its habitat is rain forests from sea-level to 650 metres (2,000 ft) altitude.
