= Chisocheton medusae =

Scientific classification
- Kingdom: Plantae
- Clade: Tracheophytes
- Clade: Angiosperms
- Clade: Eudicots
- Clade: Rosids
- Order: Sapindales
- Family: Meliaceae
- Genus: Chisocheton
- Species: C. medusae

Binomial name
- Chisocheton medusae Airy Shaw

Synonyms
- Chisocheton medusae f. hiascens Jacobs

Species of tree

Chisocheton medusae is a tree in the family Meliaceae. The specific epithet medusae refers to the mythological Medusa and alludes to the shape of the flower petals.

== Description ==
The tree grows up to 28 metres (90 ft) tall with a trunk diameter of up to 30 centimetres (12 in). The bark is black. The flowers are white. The fruits are golden-brown, up to 13 cm (5 in) in diameter.

== Distribution and habitat ==
Chisocheton medusae is endemic to Borneo. The habitat is lowland rain forests from sea-level to 400 metres (1,300 ft) altitude.
