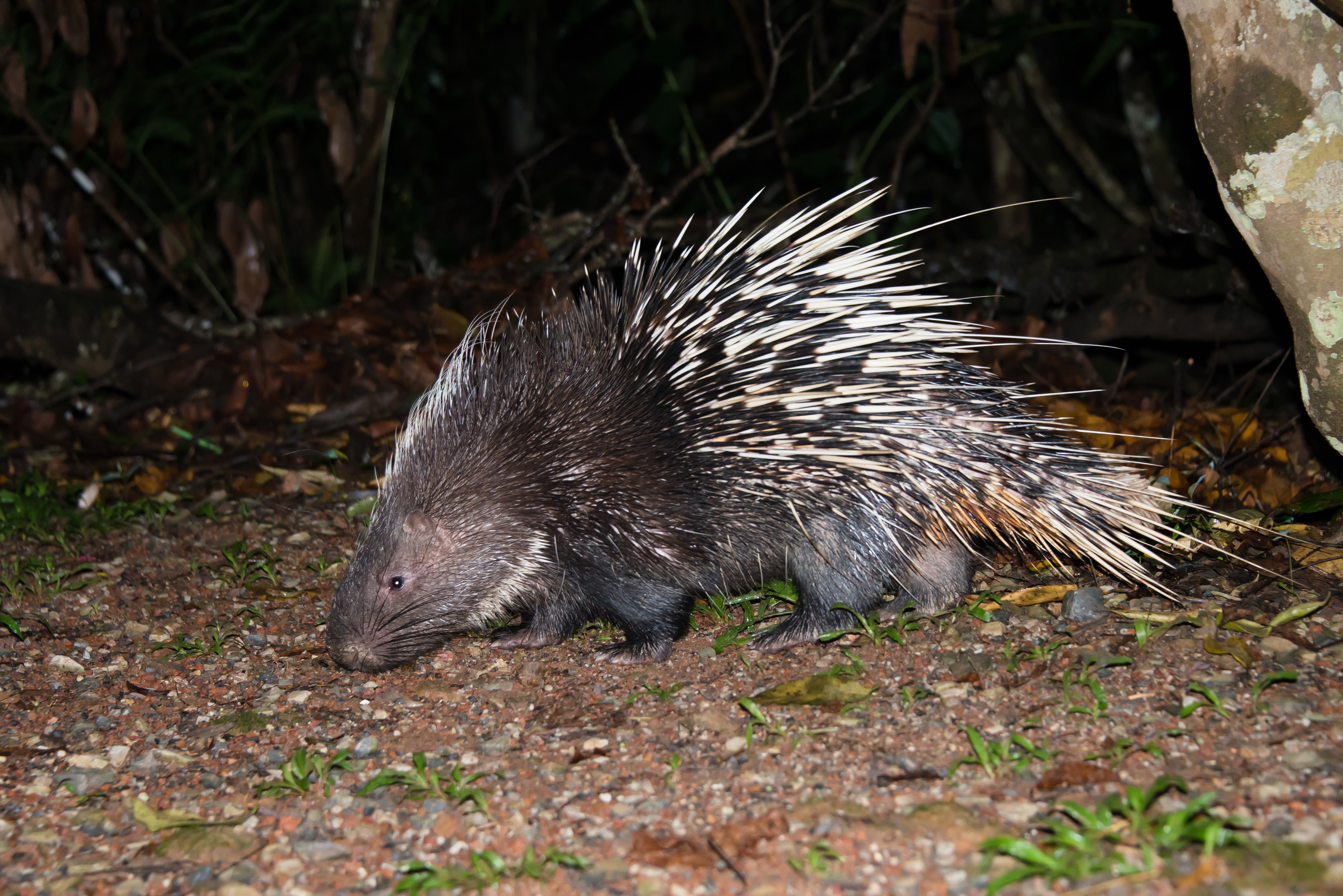
- Malayan porcupine (Hystrix brachyura)

Scientific classification
- Kingdom: Animalia
- Phylum: Chordata
- Class: Mammalia
- Order: Rodentia
- Family: Hystricidae
- Genus: Hystrix
- Subgenus: Acanthion; F. Cuvier, 1823

= Hystrix (Acanthion) =

Subgenus of rodents

Acanthion is a subgenus of Old World porcupines in the genus Hystrix. It contains two species, H. javanica and H. brachyura, the smaller species with comparatively smaller nasals. The extant species have only one black ring or coloured part on the quills.

== Included taxa ==
- Hystrix (Acanthion) javanica F. Cuvier, 1823 – Sunda porcupine
- Hystrix (A.) brachyura Linnaeus, 1758 – Malayan porcupine
  - Hystrix (A.) b. brachyura Linnaeus, 1758
  - Hystrix (A.) b. hodgsoni Gray, 1847
  - Hystrix (A.) b. subcristata Swinhoe, 1870
  - Hystrix (A.) b. punungensis subsp. nov.
