= Chisocheton setosus =

Scientific classification
- Kingdom: Plantae
- Clade: Tracheophytes
- Clade: Angiosperms
- Clade: Eudicots
- Clade: Rosids
- Order: Sapindales
- Family: Meliaceae
- Genus: Chisocheton
- Species: C. setosus

Binomial name
- Chisocheton setosus Ridl.

Species of tree

Chisocheton setosus is a tree in the family Meliaceae. The specific epithet setosus is from the Latin meaning 'with bristly hairs', referring to the fruits.

== Description ==
The tree grows up to 5.5 metres (20 ft) tall with a trunk diameter of up to 8 centimetres (3 in). The unripe fruits are pale yellow.

== Distribution and habitat ==
Chisocheton setosus is endemic to Borneo. Its habitat is rain forest.
