= Chisocheton polyandrus =

Scientific classification
- Kingdom: Plantae
- Clade: Tracheophytes
- Clade: Angiosperms
- Clade: Eudicots
- Clade: Rosids
- Order: Sapindales
- Family: Meliaceae
- Genus: Chisocheton
- Species: C. polyandrus

Binomial name
- Chisocheton polyandrus Merr.

Species of tree

Chisocheton polyandrus, of the mahogany family (Meliaceae), is a species of pachycaulous, unbranched trees variously called "palmoids", "maypole trees" or "Corner model trees" (after Prof. E.J.H. Corner who was the first to describe them as an architectural growth form) occurring among several families of unrelated trees.

C. polyandrus is native to Borneo, and grows up to a height of 15 m (49 ft) in height, and may have small buttress roots or even prop roots. It is topped by a tight circle of indeterminate, once-pinnate leaves up to 150 cm (59 in) in length, which may eventually have up to fourteen pairs of leaflets, acquired one pair at a time over a period of several months or years, each leaflet measuring up to 43 cm (17 in) long by 13 cm (5.1 in) wide. In mature leaves the oldest pair may die when a new pair is formed. The unbranched inflorescences are up to 2 m (6 ft 7 in) long with the flowers occupying just the last 30 cm (12 in) or so, eventually hanging straight down as the weight of the fruit increases. The flowers are tubular, 28 to 32 mm (1.1 to 1.3 in) in length. Petals 5 or 6, white with red blush and having up to 14 stamens. The fruit has three seeds, each covered with a red aril.
