= Chisocheton pentandrus =

Conservation status
- Least Concern (IUCN 3.1)

Scientific classification
- Kingdom: Plantae
- Clade: Tracheophytes
- Clade: Angiosperms
- Clade: Eudicots
- Clade: Rosids
- Order: Sapindales
- Family: Meliaceae
- Genus: Chisocheton
- Species: C. pentandrus

Binomial name
- Chisocheton pentandrus (Blanco) Merr.

Subspecies
- C. pentandrus subsp. paucijugus

Synonyms
- Chisocheton microcarpus Koord. & Valeton; Chisocheton parvifoliolus Merr.; Chisocheton philippinus (Turcz.) Harms; Dasycoleum philippinum Turcz.; Trichilia pentandra Blanco

Species of tree

Chisocheton pentandrus is a tree in the family Meliaceae. The specific epithet pentandrus is from the Greek meaning 'five man', referring to the five stamens of each flower.

== Description ==
The tree grows up to 40 metres (130 ft) tall with a trunk diameter of up to 60 centimetres (24 in). The bark is greenish grey. The flowers are fragrant and cream-coloured. The fruits are round or beaked, up to 2.1 cm (1 in) in diameter.

== Distribution and habitat ==
Chisocheton pentandrus is found in Thailand and Malesia.
