= Chisocheton ceramicus =

Conservation status
- Least Concern (IUCN 3.1)

Scientific classification
- Kingdom: Plantae
- Clade: Tracheophytes
- Clade: Angiosperms
- Clade: Eudicots
- Clade: Rosids
- Order: Sapindales
- Family: Meliaceae
- Genus: Chisocheton
- Species: C. ceramicus

Binomial name
- Chisocheton ceramicus Miq.

Synonyms
- List: Amoora cupulifera Merr.; Amoora mindorensis Merr.; Chisocheton clementis Merr.; Chisocheton doctersii Harms; Chisocheton globosus Pierre; Chisocheton junghuhnii C.DC.; Chisocheton macrothyrsus King; Chisocheton pachycalyx Harms; Chisocheton peekelianus Harms; Chisocheton rhytidocalyx Airy Shaw; Chisocheton sandoricocarpus Koord. & Valeton; Chisocheton spectabilis Miq.

Species of flowering plant

Chisocheton ceramicus is a tree in the family Meliaceae. It grows up to 30 metres (100 ft) tall with a trunk diameter of up to 40 centimetres (16 in). The bark is dark brown. The fragrant flowers are pinkish. The fruits are roundish, orange-red, up to 4.5 cm (2 in) in diameter. The tree is named for Seram Island in Indonesia's Maluku Islands. Its habitat is forests from sea level to 1,100 metres (3,600 ft) altitude. C. ceramicus is found in Thailand, Vietnam, throughout Malesia and in New Britain.
