= Chisocheton sarasinorum =

Scientific classification
- Kingdom: Plantae
- Clade: Tracheophytes
- Clade: Angiosperms
- Clade: Eudicots
- Clade: Rosids
- Order: Sapindales
- Family: Meliaceae
- Genus: Chisocheton
- Species: C. sarasinorum

Binomial name
- Chisocheton sarasinorum Harms

Species of tree

Chisocheton sarasinorum is a tree in the family Meliaceae. It is named for the Swiss explorers and botanists Karl Friedrich Sarasin and Paul Benedict Sarasin.

== Description ==
The tree grows up to 15 metres (50 ft) tall. The bark is greyish green. The flowers are white. Fruits are greenish brown, roundish, up to 8 cm (3 in) in diameter.

== Distribution and habitat ==
Chisocheton sarasinorum is found in Borneo and Sulawesi. Its habitat is rain forests from sea-level to 1,150 metres (4,000 ft) altitude.
