= Chisocheton macrophyllus =

Conservation status
- Least Concern (IUCN 3.1)

Scientific classification
- Kingdom: Plantae
- Clade: Tracheophytes
- Clade: Angiosperms
- Clade: Eudicots
- Clade: Rosids
- Order: Sapindales
- Family: Meliaceae
- Genus: Chisocheton
- Species: C. macrophyllus

Binomial name
- Chisocheton macrophyllus King

Species of plant

Chisocheton macrophyllus is a pachycaul rainforest tree of the East Indies, Malay Peninsula, Thailand and Nicobar Islands with very few upright limbs ultimately reaching a height of 35 m (115 ft) and a trunk diameter (above buttresses) of 70 cm (28 in); it has buttress roots up to 3 m (9.8 ft) high and 2 m (6 ft 7 in) long. Each reiteration is topped by a tight rosette of once-pinnate leaves up to 3 m (9.8 ft) long with up to 28 pairs of leaflets at any given time, each up to 39 cm (15 in) long by 11 cm (4.3 in) wide. Like all Chisocheton species, these leaves are indeterminate, forming a new pair of leaflets every few weeks or months. while the oldest pair may die. The flowers are creamy white, with four or five petals 15 mm (0.59 in) long, arranged in a thyrse up to 80 cm (31 in) long, followed by pyriform capsules up to 15 cm (5.9 in) in diameter with four seeds each 4.5 cm (1.8 in) long and shaped like a brazilnut.
