= Chisocheton ruber =

Scientific classification
- Kingdom: Plantae
- Clade: Tracheophytes
- Clade: Angiosperms
- Clade: Eudicots
- Clade: Rosids
- Order: Sapindales
- Family: Meliaceae
- Genus: Chisocheton
- Species: C. ruber

Binomial name
- Chisocheton ruber Ridl.

Species of tree

Chisocheton ruber is a tree in the family Meliaceae. The specific epithet ruber is from the Latin meaning 'red', referring to the flowers.

== Description ==
The tree grows up to 15 metres (50 ft) tall with a trunk diameter of up to 20 centimetres (8 in). The bark is greenish grey or reddish. The sweetly scented flowers are pink to red. The fruits are reddish-brown, shaped like a top, up to 5 cm (2 in) in diameter.

== Distribution and habitat ==
Chisocheton ruber is endemic to Borneo and known only from Sarawak. Its habitat is forests on limestone from 80 metres (300 ft) to 250 metres (800 ft) altitude.
