= Chisocheton macranthus =

Scientific classification
- Kingdom: Plantae
- Clade: Tracheophytes
- Clade: Angiosperms
- Clade: Eudicots
- Clade: Rosids
- Order: Sapindales
- Family: Meliaceae
- Genus: Chisocheton
- Species: C. macranthus

Binomial name
- Chisocheton macranthus (Merr.) Airy Shaw

Synonyms
- Clemensia macrantha Merr.; Dysoxylum dehiscens Elmer ex Merr.

Species of tree

Chisocheton macranthus is a tree in the family Meliaceae. The specific epithet macranthus is from the Greek meaning 'large-flowered'.

== Description ==
Chisocheton macranthus grows up to 20 m (70 ft) tall with a trunk diameter (DBH) of up to 30 cm (12 in). The young twigs and branches are up to 4 cm (1.6 in) thick; intermediate between mesocaul and pachycaul. The once-pinnate leaves of this and all Chisocheton species is indeterminate, producing a pair of new leaflets from a circinate bud at the tip of the leaf every few weeks. The flowers are creamy-pink. The fruits are recurved, up to 12 cm (5 in) in diameter.

== Distribution and habitat ==
Chisocheton macranthus is native to Borneo and the Philippines. Its habitat is lowland rain forests from sea level to 400 m (1,300 ft) altitude.
