= Sunda porcupine =

Conservation status
- Least Concern (IUCN 3.1)

Scientific classification
- Kingdom: Animalia
- Phylum: Chordata
- Class: Mammalia
- Order: Rodentia
- Family: Hystricidae
- Genus: Hystrix
- Subgenus: Acanthion
- Species: H. javanica

Binomial name
- Hystrix javanica (F. Cuvier, 1823)
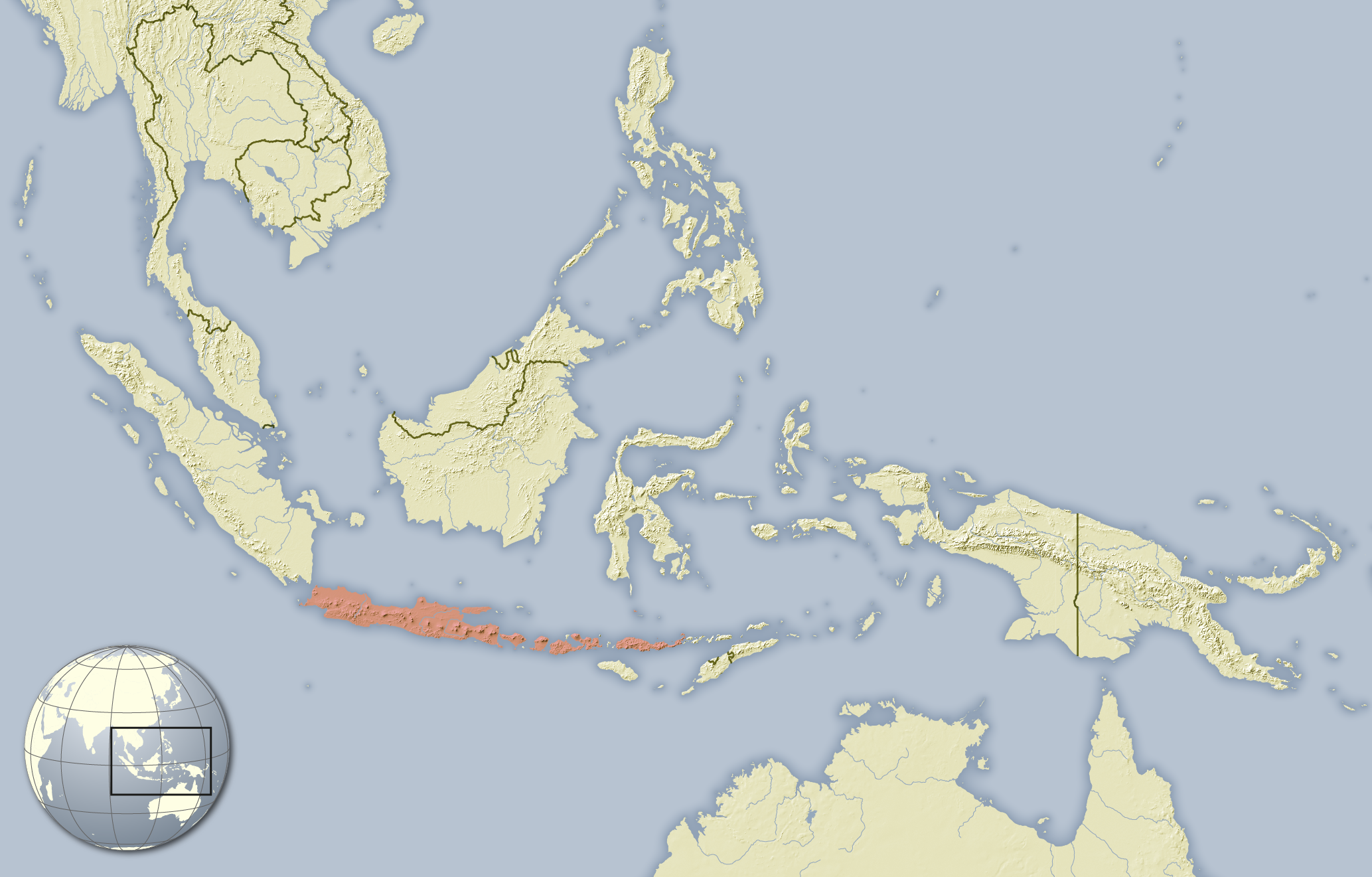
- range

Species of rodent

The Sunda porcupine also known as Javan porcupine (Hystrix javanica) is a species of rodent in the family Hystricidae. It is endemic to Indonesia. Due to the popularity of the hunting and consumption of the Sunda porcupine as an aphrodisiac, the Ministry of Environment and Forestry in Indonesia has listed this species as a protected animal as of June 2018.

Hystrix javanica is one of a number of mammalian species known to display UV fluorescence, which includes the distantly related North American porcupine.
