= Chisocheton lasiocarpus =

Scientific classification
- Kingdom: Plantae
- Clade: Embryophytes
- Clade: Tracheophytes
- Clade: Spermatophytes
- Clade: Angiosperms
- Clade: Eudicots
- Clade: Rosids
- Order: Sapindales
- Family: Meliaceae
- Genus: Chisocheton
- Species: C. lasiocarpus

Binomial name
- Chisocheton lasiocarpus Valeton

Species of tree

Chisocheton lasiocarpus is a species of tree in the genus Chisocheton in the mahogany family Meliaceae. It is a sparsely branched, slightly buttressed, somewhat stout mesocaul or rather slender pachycaul tree of the western New Guinea rainforest rising to 33 m (108 ft) in height, and possibly the only such tree with a weeping habit, the huge terminal rosettes of pinnate leaves 1.5 m (4 ft 11 in) long with an 8–15 cm (3.1–5.9 in) petiole, on the lower branches facing down toward the earth. Like all Chisocheton species, C. lasiocarpus has indeterminate leaves with a tiny circinate bud at the tip of each leaf which produces a new pair of leaflets every few weeks or months over a period of several years, each leaf eventually reaching 1.5 m (4 ft 11 in) in length. There are 9 to 11 pairs of leaflets at a time (the oldest may die as new ones are formed). Each leaflet can be up to 45 cm (18 in) long by up to 23 cm (9.1 in) wide. The flowers are white or pink, tubular, about 1 cm (0.39 in) long with 4 or 5 petals and (3–)5–10(–18) stamens. The tree is myrmecophilous (having a symbiotic relationship with certain ant species). C. lasiocarpus is a highly variable species.
