= Chisocheton amabilis =

Scientific classification
- Kingdom: Plantae
- Clade: Tracheophytes
- Clade: Angiosperms
- Clade: Eudicots
- Clade: Rosids
- Order: Sapindales
- Family: Meliaceae
- Genus: Chisocheton
- Species: C. amabilis

Binomial name
- Chisocheton amabilis Miq.

Synonyms
- Chisocheton hackenbergii Harms; Chisocheton illustris Ridl.

Species of tree

Chisocheton amabilis is a tree in the family Meliaceae. It grows up to 17 metres (60 ft) tall with a trunk diameter of up to 10 centimetres (4 in). The bark is grey-green. The fragrant flowers are white, sometimes pink-tipped. The fruits are round, pink ripening to bright red, up to 4 cm (2 in) in diameter. The specific epithet amabilis is from the Latin meaning 'lovely'. Habitat is peatswamp and riparian forests from sea-level to 20 metres (100 ft) altitude. C. amabilis is found in Sumatra, Peninsular Malaysia and Borneo.
