= Chisocheton patens =

Scientific classification
- Kingdom: Plantae
- Clade: Tracheophytes
- Clade: Angiosperms
- Clade: Eudicots
- Clade: Rosids
- Order: Sapindales
- Family: Meliaceae
- Genus: Chisocheton
- Species: C. patens

Binomial name
- Chisocheton patens Blume

Synonyms
- List: Chisocheton barbatus C.DC.; Chisocheton divergens Blume; Chisocheton divergens var. minor Valeton; Chisocheton divergens var. robustus Valeton; Chisocheton fragrans Hiern; Chisocheton fulvus Merr.; Chisocheton glomeratus Hiern; Chisocheton holocalyx Hiern; Chisocheton tetrapetalus (Turcz.) Turcz.; Chisocheton vrieseanus C.DC.; Chisocheton peekelianus Harms; Dysoxylum kanehirai (Sasaki) Kaneh. & Hatus.

Species of tree

Chisocheton patens is a tree in the family Meliaceae. The specific epithet patens is from the Latin meaning 'spreading', referring to the inflorescence.

== Description ==
The tree grows up to 35 metres (110 ft) tall with a trunk diameter of up to 70 centimetres (28 in). The bark is pale greenish to black. The flowers are fragrant. The fruits are roundish, up to 5 cm (2 in) in diameter.

== Distribution and habitat ==
Chisocheton patens is found in Thailand and Malesia. Its habitat is lowland rain forests from sea-level to 500 metres (1,600 ft) altitude.
