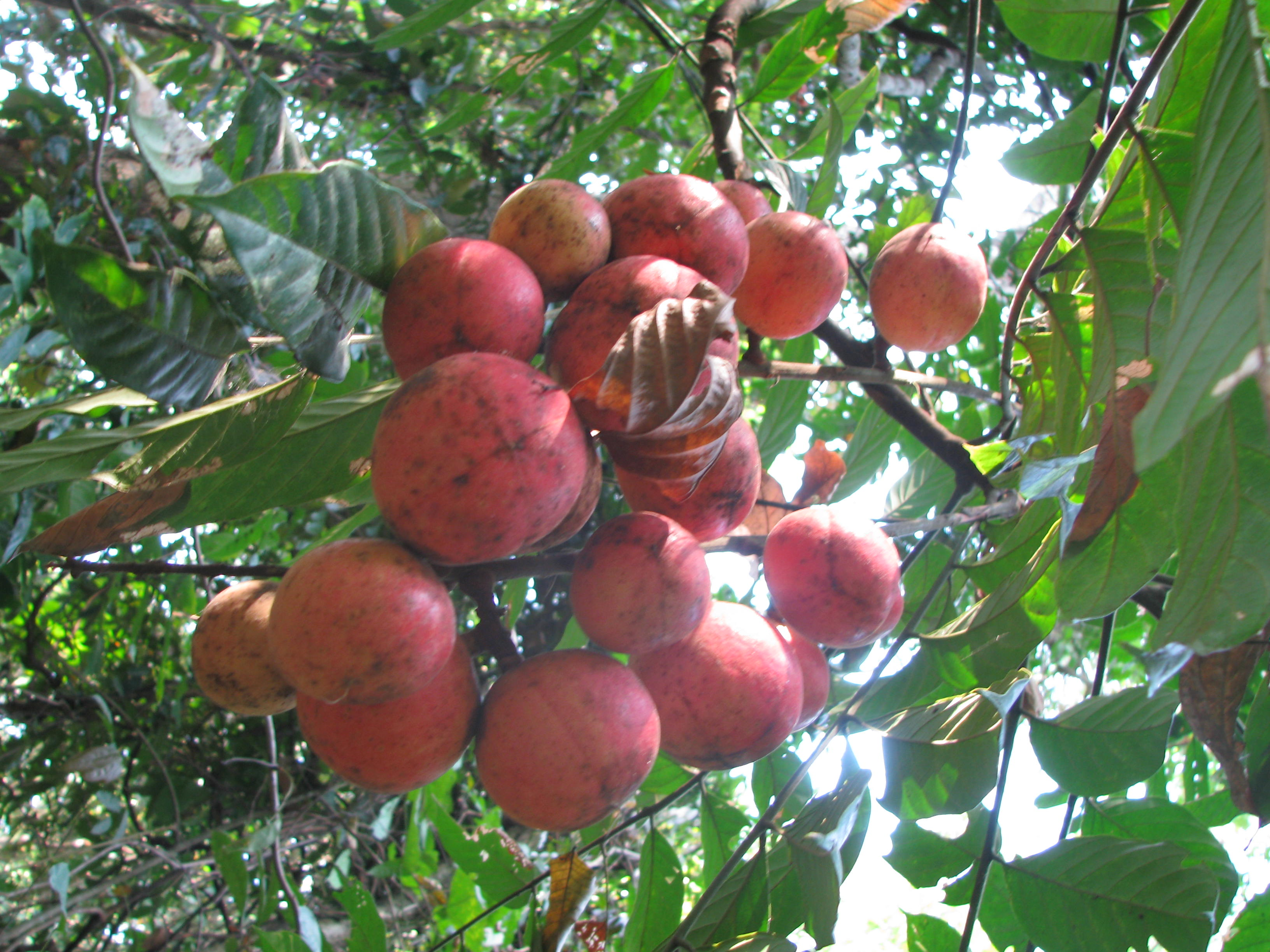
- Fruit of Chisocheton cumingianus subsp. balansae

Scientific classification
- Kingdom: Plantae
- Clade: Tracheophytes
- Clade: Angiosperms
- Clade: Eudicots
- Clade: Rosids
- Order: Sapindales
- Family: Meliaceae
- Subfamily: Melioideae
- Genus: Chisocheton; Blume (1825)

Species
- 50; see text

Synonyms
- Clemensia Merr. (1908); Dasycoleum Turcz. (1858); Megaphyllaea Hemsl. (1887); Melioschinzia K.Schum. (1889); Rhetinosperma Radlk. (1907); Schizochiton Spreng. (1827), orth. var.

= Chisocheton =

Genus of flowering plants

Chisocheton is a genus of trees in the family Meliaceae. The genus name comes from the Greek schizos and chiton meaning "split tunic", referring to the lobed staminal tube of C. patens. Their range is from India and tropical China, throughout Malesia and south to New South Wales and Vanuatu.

== Description ==
Chisocheton is typically dioecious. Flowers are usually unisexual, rarely bisexual, with a cup-shaped calyx. Fruits are one or two-seeded. Chisocheton habitats are rain forests, typically understorey trees, from sea-level to about 1,500 metres (5,000 ft) elevation.

The wood of several Chisocheton species is used locally in light construction. In the Philippines, the seeds of Chisocheton cumingianus (known locally as balukanag) are used to make a non-drying oil either for traditional medicine or as fuel for oil lamps.

== Leaf indeterminacy ==
Unlike nearly all other seed plants, the leaves of Chisocheton have indeterminate growth - they never stop growing. Instead of forming a terminal leaflet, they form a small circinate leaf-tip bud, which produces new leaflets continuously, every few days or weeks until some physiological limit is exceeded.

This trait is shared with a few closely related genera, such as Guarea.

== Species ==
As of February 2024 Plants of the World Online accepts 50 species.

- Chisocheton aenigmaticus Mabb. – western Sumatra
- Chisocheton amabilis Miq. – Borneo, Sumatra, Peninsular Malaysia, and southern Thailand
- Chisocheton cauliflorus Merr. – southeastern Philippines
- Chisocheton celebicus Koord. – northeastern Sulawesi
- Chisocheton ceramicus Miq. – Malesia, Papuasia, Thailand, and Vietnam
- Chisocheton crustularii Mabb. – Borneo (Sarawak)
- Chisocheton cumingianus (C.DC.) Harms – eastern Indian Subcontinent, Indochina, southern China, Borneo, Philippines, Sulawesi, Maluku Islands, and Papuasia
  - subsp. balansae (C.DC.) Mabb. – eastern Himalayas, Bangladesh, Indochina, and southern China
  - subsp. cumingianus – Laos, Vietnam, Philippines, Sulawesi, Maluku Islands, and Papuasia
  - subsp. kinabaluensis (Merr.) Mabb. – Borneo (Sabah)
- Chisocheton curranii Merr. – Philippines (Luzon)
- Chisocheton diversifolius Miq. – Sumatra
- Chisocheton dysoxylifolius Kurz – Bangladesh, Myanmar, and Thailand
- Chisocheton erythrocarpus Hiern – Borneo, Peninsular Malaysia, and Vietnam
- Chisocheton gliroides P.F.Stevens – southeastern New Guinea
- Chisocheton granatum Mabb. – Borneo (Mount Kinabalu)
- Chisocheton grandiflorus Kurz – Myanmar and Thailand
- Chisocheton koordersii Mabb. – eastern Borneo and Sulawesi
- Chisocheton lansiifolius Mabb. – Borneo
- Chisocheton laosensis Pellegr. – Maluku Islands
- Chisocheton lasiocarpus (Miq.) Valeton – Papuasia and Maluku Islands
- Chisocheton lasiogynus Boerl. & Koord.-Schum. – Sumatra and western Java
- Chisocheton longistipitatus (F.M.Bailey) L.S.Sm. – New Guinea, Solomon Islands, and Queensland
- Chisocheton macranthus (Merr.) Airy Shaw – northern Borneo and southern Philippines
- Chisocheton macrophyllus King – Borneo, Peninsular Malaysia, Thailand, Sumatra, and Nicobar Islands
- Chisocheton maxilla-pisticis Mabb. – Borneo and Philippines
- Chisocheton medusae Airy Shaw – Borneo
- Chisocheton mendozai F.H.Hildebr. ex Steenis – Philippines (Samar)
- Chisocheton montanus P.F.Stevens – eastern New Guinea
- Chisocheton novobritannicus P.F.Stevens – Bismarck Archipelago
- Chisocheton patens Blume – Myanmar, Thailand, Vietnam, Peninsular Malaysia, Sumatra, Java, Borneo, Sulawesi, and Philippines
- Chisocheton pauciflorus King - Peninsular Malaysia
- Chisocheton pellegrinianus Mabb. – Vietnam
- Chisocheton penduliflorus Planch. ex Hiern – Peninsular Malaysia and Peninsular Thailand
- Chisocheton pentandrus (Blanco) Merr. – Malesia and Thailand
  - subsp. medius Mabb. – Borneo and Philippines
  - subsp. paucijugus (Miq.) Mabb. – Peninsular Thailand, Peninsular Malaysia, Sumatra, Borneo, and Philippines
  - subsp. pentandrus – Peninsular Thailand, Peninsular Malaysia, Borneo, Java, Philippines, Sulawesi, Lesser Sunda Islands, and Maluku Islands
- Chisocheton perakensis (Hemsl.) Mabb. – Peninsular Malaysia
- Chisocheton pilosus C.DC. – western New Guinea
- Chisocheton pohlianus Harms – eastern New Guinea
- Chisocheton polyandrus Merr. – northern Borneo
- Chisocheton rex Mabb. – Vanuatu
- Chisocheton ruber Ridl. – Borneo (Sarawak)
- Chisocheton sapindinus P.F.Stevens – eastern New Guinea
- Chisocheton sarasinorum Harms – northern and northeastern Borneo and Sulawesi
- Chisocheton sarawakanus (C.DC.) Harms – Peninsular Malaysia, Sumatra, and Borneo
- Chisocheton sayeri (C.DC.) P.F.Stevens – New Guinea
- Chisocheton schoddei P.F.Stevens – southeastern New Guinea
- Chisocheton setosus Ridl. – northern Borneo
- Chisocheton stellatus P.F.Stevens – New Guinea
- Chisocheton tenuis P.F.Stevens – eastern New Guinea
- Chisocheton tomentosus (Roxb.) Mabb. – Peninsular Malaysia and Peninsular Thailand
- Chisocheton velutinus Mabb. – Borneo
- Chisocheton vindictae Mabb. – northern Sumatra
- Chisocheton warburgii Harms – northern Sulawesi and southeastern New Guinea
