= Chisocheton pohlianus =

Scientific classification
- Kingdom: Plantae
- Clade: Tracheophytes
- Clade: Angiosperms
- Clade: Eudicots
- Clade: Rosids
- Order: Sapindales
- Family: Meliaceae
- Genus: Chisocheton
- Species: C. pohlianus

Binomial name
- Chisocheton pohlianus Harms

Species of flowering plant

Chisocheton pohlianus is a species of flowering plant belonging to the mahogany family (Meliaceae).

== Distribution ==
It is a small, lower story, leptocaul rainforest tree from New Guinea.

== Description ==
It is not more than 8 m (26 ft) in height and 7 cm (2.8 in) thick. Like all Chisocheton species it has indeterminate, pinnate leaves in this case up to 2 m (6 ft 7 in) long and having as many as 28 pairs of leaflets at any given time. Each time the tiny circinate bud at the tip of the leaf forms a new pair of leaflets, the leaf simultaneously produces, further back, a small 5 cm (2.0 in) inflorescence, but not at the same spot as where a pair of leaflets are attached, but halfway between two pairs of leaflets. The jury is still out as to whether these are inflorescences fused to a leaf (as in Tilia spp. and Phyllobotryon spp.) or whether the leaves have assumed reproductive function (as in certain Streptocarpus spp). The difficulty is in reconciling an indeterminate leaf with determinate inflorescences. The flowers are tubular, about 10 mm (0.39 in) long with four (rarely three) petals, pale greenish-white, and with the fragrance of Cymbopogon.
