= Chisocheton sarawakanus =

Scientific classification
- Kingdom: Plantae
- Clade: Embryophytes
- Clade: Tracheophytes
- Clade: Angiosperms
- Clade: Eudicots
- Clade: Rosids
- Order: Sapindales
- Family: Meliaceae
- Genus: Chisocheton
- Species: C. sarawakanus

Binomial name
- Chisocheton sarawakanus (C.DC.) Harms

Synonyms
- Chisocheton brachyanthus Merr.; Chisocheton laxiflorus King; Dasycoleum sarawakanum C.DC.

Species of tree

Chisocheton sarawakanus is a tree in the family Meliaceae. It is named for Malaysia's Sarawak state.

== Description ==
The tree grows up to 20 metres (70 ft) tall with a trunk diameter of up to 30 centimetres (12 in). The bark is coloured fawn to chocolate. The sweetly scented flowers are white. The fruits are crimson, roundish, up to 4 cm (2 in) in diameter.

== Distribution and habitat ==
Chisocheton sarawakanus is found in Sumatra, Peninsular Malaysia and Borneo. Its habitat is rain forests from sea-level to 250 metres (800 ft) altitude.
