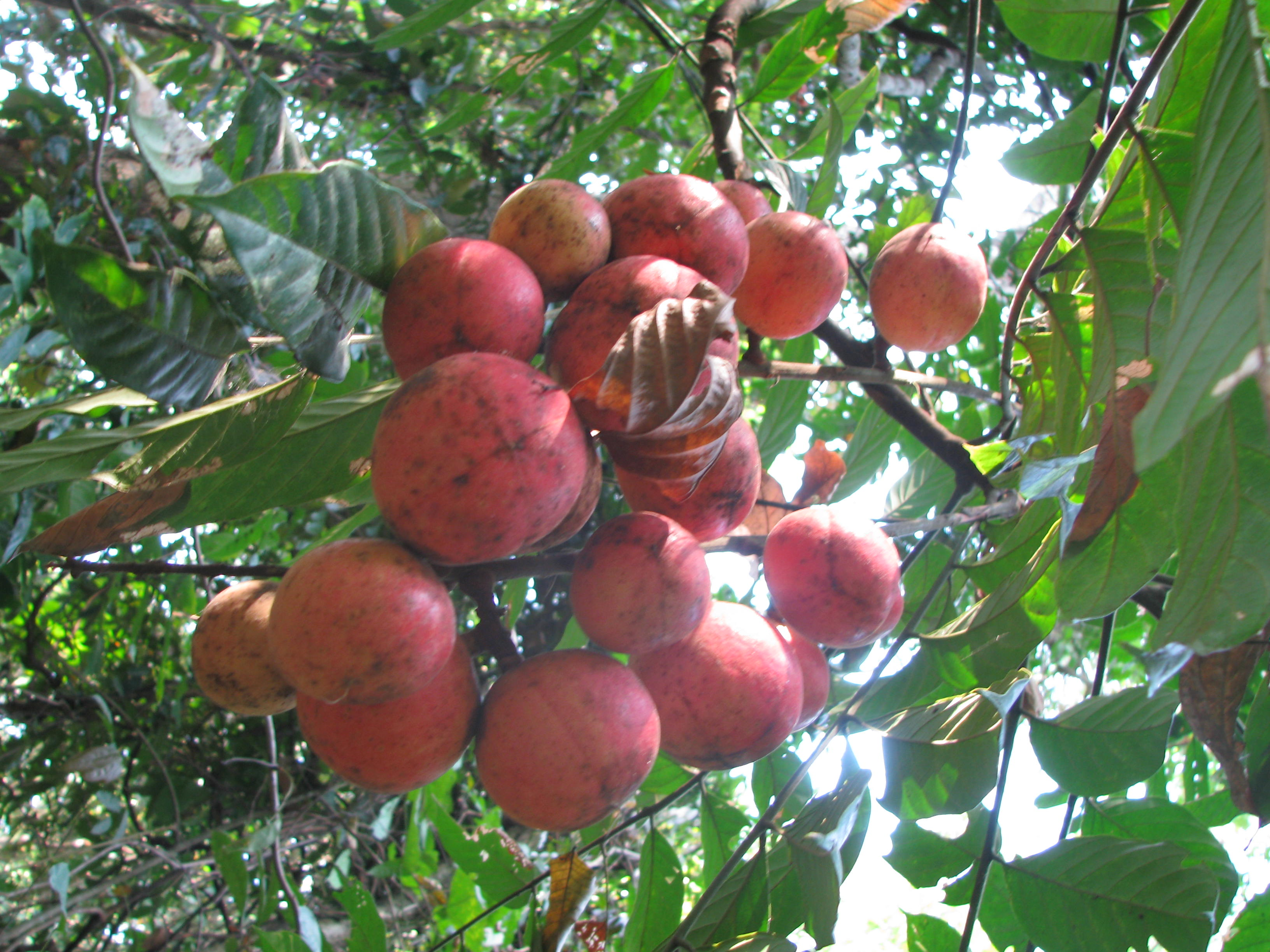
- Fruits of Chisocheton cumingianus subsp. balansae

Conservation status
- Least Concern (IUCN 3.1)

Scientific classification
- Kingdom: Plantae
- Clade: Tracheophytes
- Clade: Angiosperms
- Clade: Eudicots
- Clade: Rosids
- Order: Sapindales
- Family: Meliaceae
- Genus: Chisocheton
- Species: C. cumingianus

Binomial name
- Chisocheton cumingianus (C.DC.) Harms

Subspecies
- C. cumingianus subsp. balansae (C.DC.) Mabb.; C. cumingianus subsp. cumingianus; C. cumingianus subsp. kinabaluensis (Merr.) Mabb.

Synonyms
- Dasycoleum cumingianum C.DC.

= Chisocheton cumingianus =

Species of tree

Chisocheton cumingianus is a tree in the family Meliaceae. The tree is named for the English naturalist Hugh Cuming. Habitat is rain forests from sea-level to 1,300 metres (4,300 ft) elevation. C. cumingianus is found from India and tropical China through Indochina and throughout Malaysia. In the Philippines, the seeds of C. cumingianus (known locally as balukanag) are used to make a non-drying oil either for traditional medicine or as fuel for oil lamps.

== Subspecies ==
Three subspecies are currently recognised: C. cumingianus subsp. balansae, C. cumingianus subsp. cumingianus, and C. cumingianus subsp. kinabaluensis.

C. cumingianus subsp. balansae
This subspecies occurs on the Asian mainland.
C. cumingianus subsp. cumingianus
This subspecies is native to Laos, Vietnam, the Philippines, Sulawesi, New Guinea, and the Solomon Islands.
C. cumingianus subsp. kinabaluensis
This subspecies is endemic to Borneo and known only from Sabah. It grows as a large tree. The inflorescences are borne on the bole and are often very close to the ground.
