= Peter Taylor (environmentalist) =

British environmentalist (born 1948)

- Born: 24 January 1948 (age 77)

Peter Taylor (born 24 January 1948) is a UK environmentalist, public activist on issues ranging from nuclear safety, ocean pollution, biodiversity strategies, renewable energy and climate change. He is the author of five books: Beyond Conservation: A Wildland Strategy (2005), Shiva's Rainbow, Chill: A Reassessment of Global Warming Theory (2009), Questions of Resilience: Development Aid in a Changing Climate (2010), and Rewilding: ECOS Writings on Wildland and Conservation Values (2011).

His book Chill claimed, contrary to the scientific consensus on climate change, that most of the recent documented warming is likely caused by natural cycles. He also suggested there is a potential for global cooling, and that adaptation not mitigation should be the priority. His views received widespread coverage in the media – with front page on the Daily Express, and articles in the online versions of The Times and an Al Jazeera video.

== Education ==
Born in January 1948, Taylor was educated at Cowbridge Grammar School in Glamorgan, Wales from where he won an Open Scholarship to St Catherine's College, Oxford University. He graduated with honours in Natural Sciences from the School of Zoology in 1970. As a student, he led an inter-university biological expedition to East Africa. After six years of what he describes in his autobiography Shiva's Rainbow as an adventurer and explorer, including a solo vehicle-crossing of the Sahara and climbing the Eiger, he returned to Oxford to study Social Anthropology under the linguistic anthropologist Edwin Ardener.

== Political Ecology Research Group ==
Taylor left his academic studies in anthropology in order to develop the Political Ecology Research Group (PERG) which he founded in 1976. Eschewing the academic elements of political ecology and the need for theory in favour of political involvement, the group pioneered scientific and legal support for environmental policy initiatives and worked closely with Greenpeace International, trade unions and, at times, government agencies. The group held the copyright on all its work, publishing over 20 research reports between 1978 and 1992. Taylor published an account of the anti-nuclear movement in The Ecologist - a text used by the Open University for its Control of Technology Course, and in assessment of nuclear risk in the science journal Nature.

Taylor became a public figure following the 1977 Windscale Inquiry into nuclear fuel reprocessing during which he exposed the potential risks of nuclear waste storage and mounted a successful campaign against radioactive discharges to the marine environment – his work was widely reported in the national press, New Scientist, The Ecologist and the New Internationalist. Between 1980 and 1992 he became an advisor to a range of organisations, from government agencies to environmental NGOs, and appeared on TV and radio in regards to issues of nuclear risk and pollution. His work highlighted the potential health impact of the Windscale Fire in 1957 - in the PERG report RR-7, and in association with Yorkshire TV, the potential excess of childhood cancers around Sellafield - theory that later research debunked. He served on the government commission into nuclear waste dumping at sea (chaired by Sir Fred Holliday) which recommended the practice be banned. He also sat on a research advisory group on nuclear waste management set up by the Department of Environment – resigning when he felt the UK Government were not allowing time for detailed comparative assessment of the options.

The work of PERG potentially influenced the limiting of the development of nuclear fuel reprocessing and the 'plutonium economy', particularly in Germany, cleaning up discharges to the Irish Sea, altering perceptions of the risks of ionising radiation and the consequences of reactor meltdowns. The group also produced the first study into renewable energy strategies in a report for the European Parliament in 1980; the first comparative study of organic and conventional agriculture, and the first UK study of forestry as carbon sequestration.

Taylor involved both of his brothers during the 1980s campaigns, with Ron infiltrating the US Nevada weapons test site and leading the Greenpeace climb of Big Ben and Robert heading the Greenpeace international strategy on chemical wastes.

In 1992, PERG evolved into an international network of independent experts on terrestrial and marine ecosystems – Terramarès – to carry out critical science policy analysis. This group worked collectively and individually behind the scenes in several topics of important developments – with Jackson Davis helping to lay the foundation for the Framework Climate Convention, and in Clean Production Strategies and the Precautionary Principle with Tim Jackson (now Professor of Sustainable Development at the University of Surrey); and further work on energy strategies with Gordon Thompson who now leads the Institute for Resource and Security Studies in Cambridge, Massachusetts (ref IRSS). Taylor's work on ocean pollution culminated in 1993 with a critique of the UN's ocean protection system in the peer-reviewed journal Bulletin of Marine Pollution.

== Beyond conservation ==
Taylor moved from Oxford to North Wales to pursue interests in wildlife conservation and shamanism. As a member of the British Association of Nature Conservationists he organised the conference 'Wilderness Britain' in 1995 and a National Trust seminar on wilderness and wildland values at its Centennial Conference. He was a keynote speaker at the BANC/National Trust 1999 'Nature in Transition' conference in July 1999 and co-authored the National Trust's document "Call for the Wild".

His articles in BANC's journal ECOS contributed to the new wave of consciousness in conservation known as 'rewilding' culminating in 2005 with the publication of his book Beyond Conservation and the founding of the Wildland Network. In this work Taylor argues that conservation is too preservation-oriented and needs to be more creative and focussed upon wilder and larger-scale land management. Chris Baines, a British conservationist, described Taylor's book as important and brilliantly capturing the changing mood of conservation and Peter Marren gave it a one-page spread in The Independent. Alan Watson Featherstone, of Trees For Life endorsed the cover and Bill Adams, from Cambridge University, also endorsed it writing "Peter Taylor builds bridges between ecology, countryside policy and spirituality."

In networking ecological practitioners and land managers, Taylor worked to construct a political strategy for rewilding conservation through regional seminars, national conferences and in 2008, his colleague in the network Steve Carver founded the Wildland Research Institute at Leeds University.

== Energy and climate change ==
In the lead up to his work on climate change, Taylor developed strategies for the integration of renewable energy into countryside policy on community and biodiversity. Between 2000 and 2003, he was appointed to the UK National Advisory Group of the Community Renewables Initiative (CRI) – a joint Countryside Agency and Department of Trade and Industry taskforce on community scale renewable energy. To aid this work he set up the design consultancy Ethos, which combined science expertise from Terramarès with graphic design and the use of computer virtual reality for visualising change and integrating development in the countryside.

Taylor's controversial reassessment of global warming theory in 2009 outlined his concern that the remedies for climate change might prove more damaging to the environment than the ailment itself. He claimed that his work with the CRI had given him a deeper insight into the impacts associated with powering a modern economy from renewable sources. The book received little publicity at first – but in the lead up to the Copenhagen summit, his views were widely publicised.

Taylor's qualification to review climate science and his embrace of mystical philosophy and shamanism have been questioned.

His detractors have focussed upon his statements in Shiva's Rainbow of how science in public policy is mostly theatre and how he was more of an actor than a scientist. Taylor admits that most of his work was as a lawyer - 'the ultimate actor', but argues that his record as an experienced policy analyst has been glossed over by those who are averse to his message on climate change.

== Yoga and healing work ==
In his autobiography, Taylor mentions studying with the yogic master Babaji, training with the founder of rebirthing Leonard Orr, and practising as a breathing therapist and teacher of meditation – in which he now has an international reputation. In recent years he has also trained with western shamanic practitioners and brings this perspective into his ecological conservation work. He is often invited to speak at 'alternative' conventions where he has outlined his understanding of the connections between science and consciousness. Taylor featured in Karen Sawyer's The Dangerous Man as someone who challenges the fixed paradigms of science and social control.

Taylor warns in his recent presentations, and in his autobiography, that humanity faces a crisis of consciousness and that much of the enthusiasm and caring for the Earth, especially among young people, is being channeled into collusion with undemocratic corporate power structures in the banking world. In this vein, he argues in Chill that mitigation of climate change is a delusion and that resources need to be channeled into adaptation, the creation of resilient human communities, and a robust biodiversity.

== Certifications and memberships ==
Taylor has been a member of the Institute of Biology and is a certified Biologist, a former member of the International Union of Radioecologists, the International Society for Radiation Protection and the British Ecological Society. He is currently a member of the Royal Anthropological Institute.

== Bibliography ==
Books

- The Nuclear Controversy: a guide to the Windcsale Inquiry, Martin Stott and Peter Taylor, TCPA, London, 1980.
- Beyond Conservation: a wildland strategy, Peter Taylor, Earthscan, London, 2005. ISBN 1-84407-197-9
- Shiva's Rainbow: an autobiography, Peter Taylor, Ethos, Oxford. ISBN 978-0-954706401
- Chill: a reassessment of global warming theory, Peter Taylor, Clairview, Forest Row, 2009. ISBN 978-1-905570-19-5
- Questions of Resilience: development aid in a changing climate, Ethos, Oxford, 2010. ISBN 978-0-9547064-1-8
- Rewilding: ECOS writings on wildland and conservation values, Ethos, Oxford, 2011. ISBN 978-0-954706425

Chapters

- (1993) The Precautionary Principle (with Jackson and Dethlefsen) in Clean Production Strategies. ed. Jackson, Stockholm Environment Institute.
- (1992) Non-governmental organisations and the legal protection of the oceans (with Kevin Stairs) in International Politics and the Environment ed. Hurrell & Kingsbury, Clarendon, Oxford.
- (1980) The assessment and assumptions of risk in The Fast Breeder Reactor, ed. Sweet, Macmillan, London.

Research reports & Scientific papers

- The State of the Marine Environment 'A critique of the work and the role of the Joint Group of Experts on Scientific Aspects of Marine Pollution (GESAMP). Marine Pollution Bulletin 26, 3: 120-127
