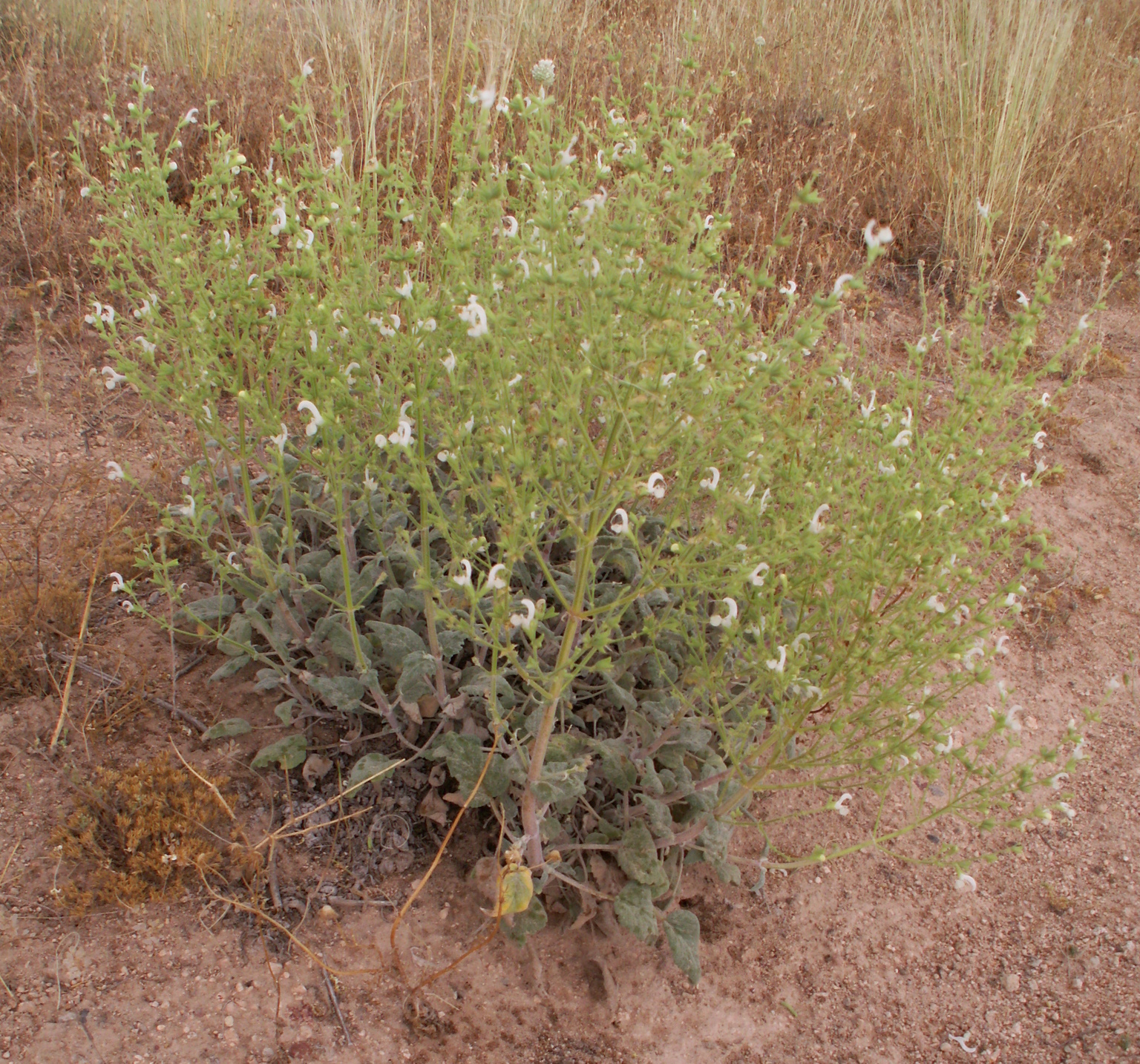

Scientific classification
- Kingdom: Plantae
- Clade: Tracheophytes
- Clade: Angiosperms
- Clade: Eudicots
- Clade: Asterids
- Order: Lamiales
- Family: Lamiaceae
- Genus: Salvia
- Species: S. candidissima

Binomial name
- Salvia candidissima Vahl

= Salvia candidissima =

Species of flowering plant

Salvia candidissima, the blazing white sage, is a herbaceous perennial native throughout western Greece, and parts of Turkey, Iraq, and Iran, generally between 2000 and 6500 feet elevation.

Several small stems grow almost horizontally from the roots before bearing upright inflorescences. The plant reaches 3 ft in height and width in the wild. The light green leaves, 6 in long by 4 in wide, are covered with hairs on both sides and often have notches on the edges. The leaves become lighter in color as the weather gets hotter. The 8–12 inch inflorescences are branched, with 1 inch flowers in whorls that are creamy white and sometimes tipped with a yellow lip.

Salvia candidissima is one of a group of seven salvias that are closely related, grow in the same habitat, and easily hybridize with each other, resulting in a great deal of variety in the species.
