= Benjamin Balansa =

French botanist

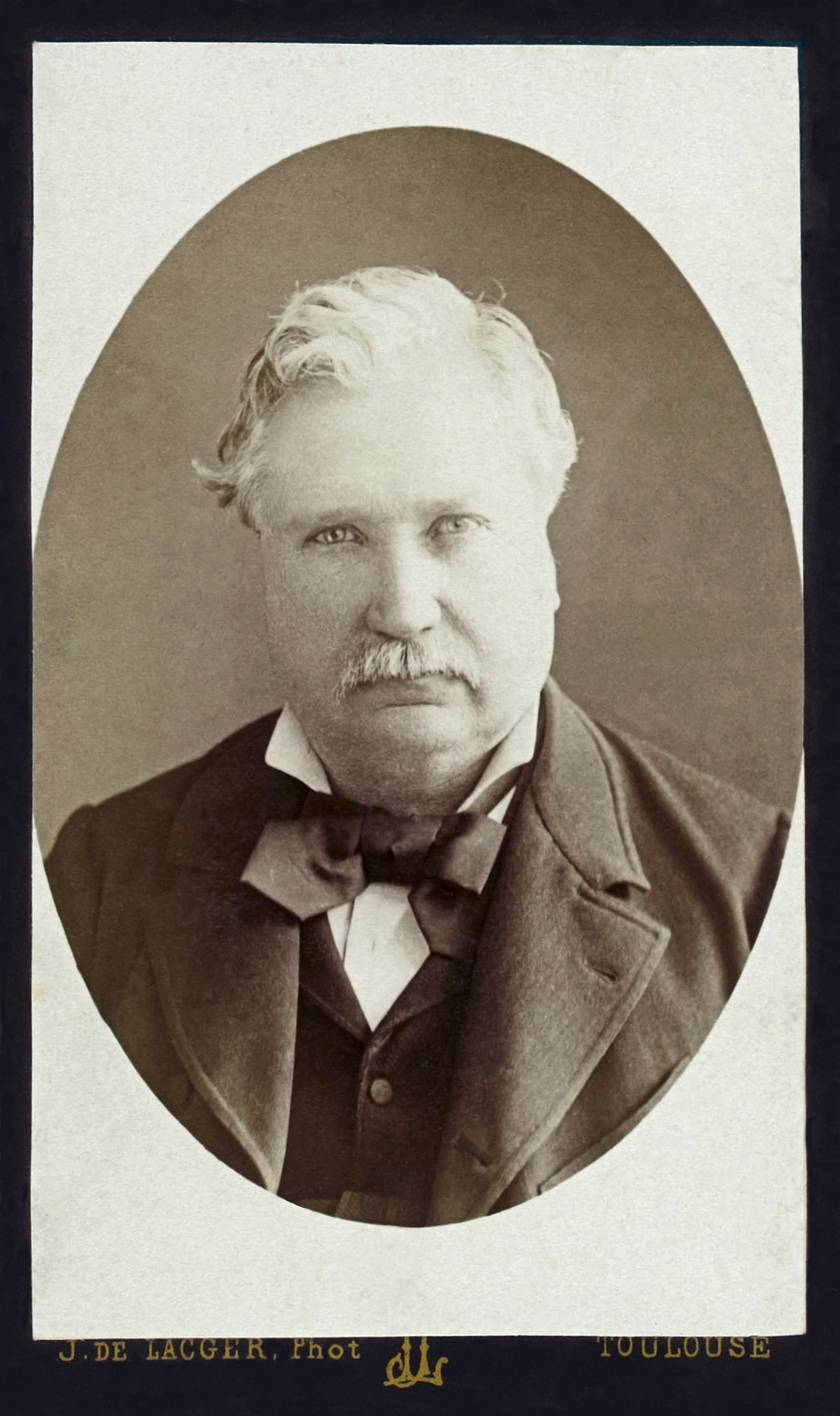
- Balansa in 1885
- Born: Gaspard Joseph Benedict Balansa; 25 March 1825; Narbonne, Kingdom of France
- Died: 2 November 1891 (aged 66); Hanoi, Tonkin, French Indochina
- Other name: Benedict Balansa
- Scientific career
- Author abbrev. (botany): Balansa

Gaspard Joseph Benedict Balansa, also known as Benjamin Balansa or Benedict Balansa (25 March 1825 – 2 November 1891), was a French botanist.

== Biography ==
Balansa was born on 25 March 1825 in Narbonne. Balansa made numerous collecting trips for the Muséum national d'Histoire naturelle in Paris which holds most of his plant specimens. Others are in Muséum de Toulouse.

His first journey, from 1847 to 1848, was to Algiers and Mostaganem in Algeria.

From 1850 to 1853, Balansa returned to Algeria, collecting plants again in Mostaganem and later in Oran, Muaskar, the Northern Sahara, Biskra and Batna.

From 1854 to 1855 he undertook his first trip to Asia travelling first to Smyrna and the surrounding regions in April and May, 1854. From March until October 1855 he lived in Mersin and the Taurus Mountains of Cilicia. The following year, he travelled from June until September 1856 from Tarsus to Kayseri in Cappadocia. In 1857 he settled with his family in Smyrna. From May until July 1857 he explored Uşak and the surrounding area and until 1865 he undertook tours to Phrygia and Cilicia. In 1866, he made a trip to Lazistan and the Caucasus, where he collected from June to August in the area of Trabzon and Rize. In autumn 1866 he returned to France.

A year later, in 1867 he collected in Morocco in the area of Mogador, the Atlas Mountains and Marrakesh.

From 1868 to 1872 Balansa stayed overseas in New Caledonia and the Loyalty Islands. During this time he was Director of the Jardin d'Acclimatation in Nouméa. From 1873 to 1877, he made his first trip to Paraguay, followed by a second from 1878 to 1884. In the years from 1885 to 1889, he collected in Tonkin and undertook a trip to the island of Java. Balansa died on 2 November 1891 in Hanoi during his second stay in Tonkin.

Balansa edited and distributed several exsiccatae and exsiccata-like specimens series, among them Plantes d'Algérie 1851 and Plantes d'Orient 1854.

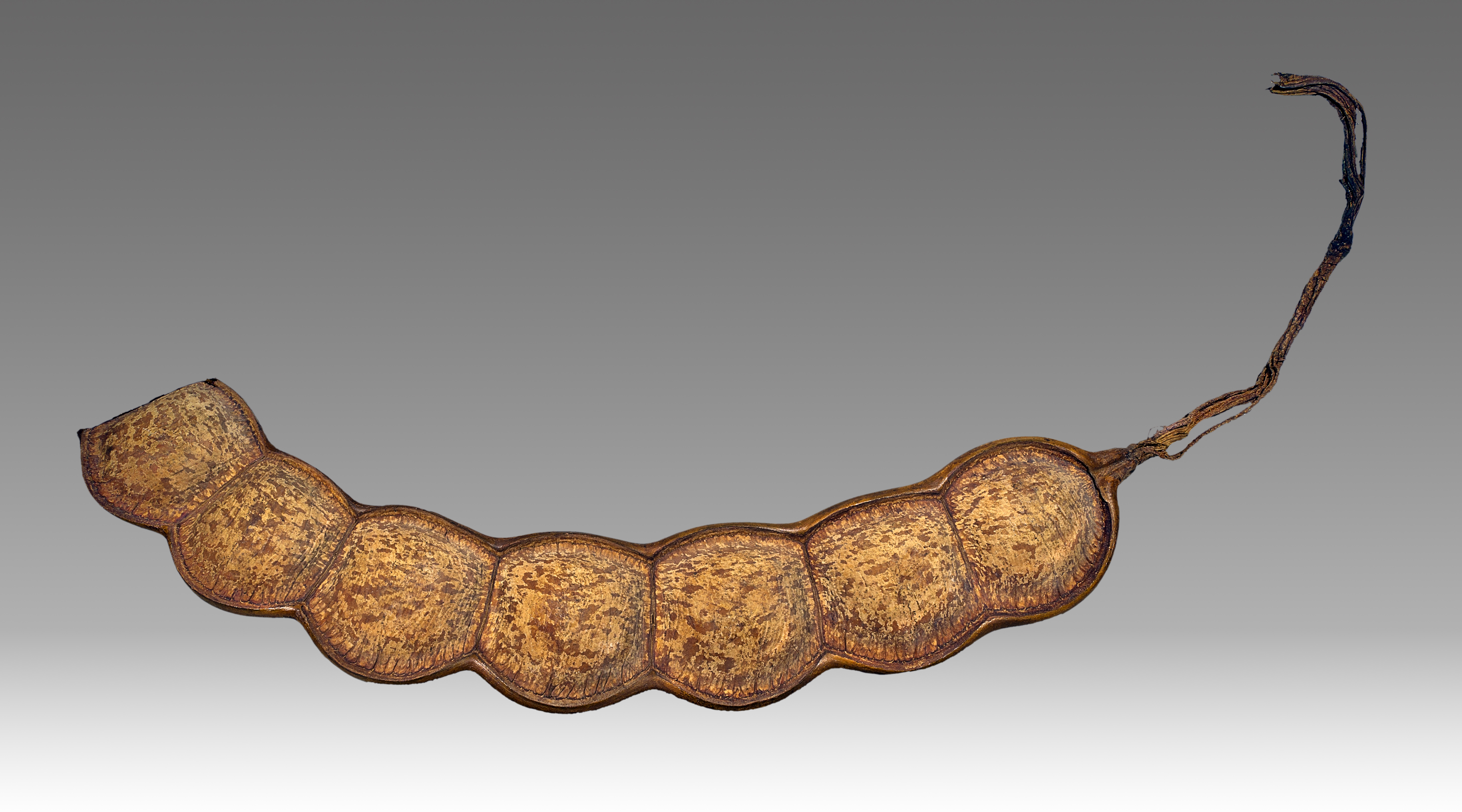
Entada phaseoloides Balansa collection MHNT

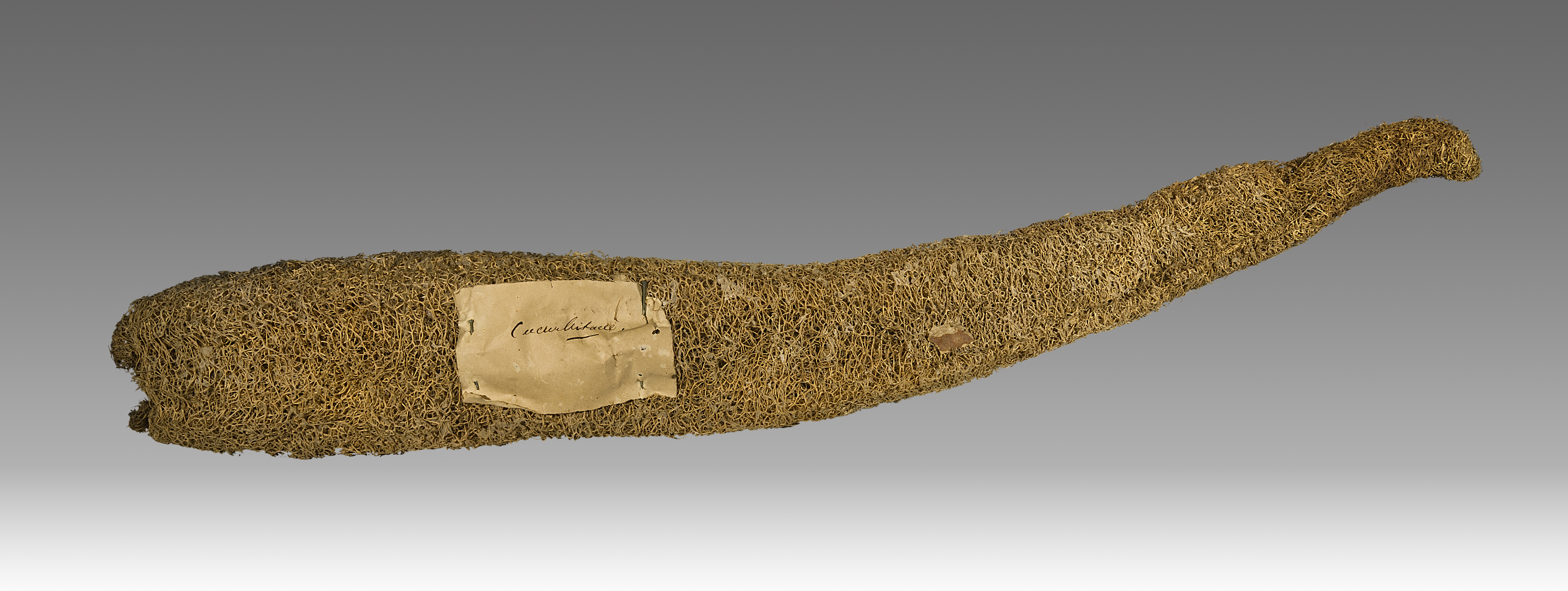
Luffa aegyptiaca Balansa collection MHNT

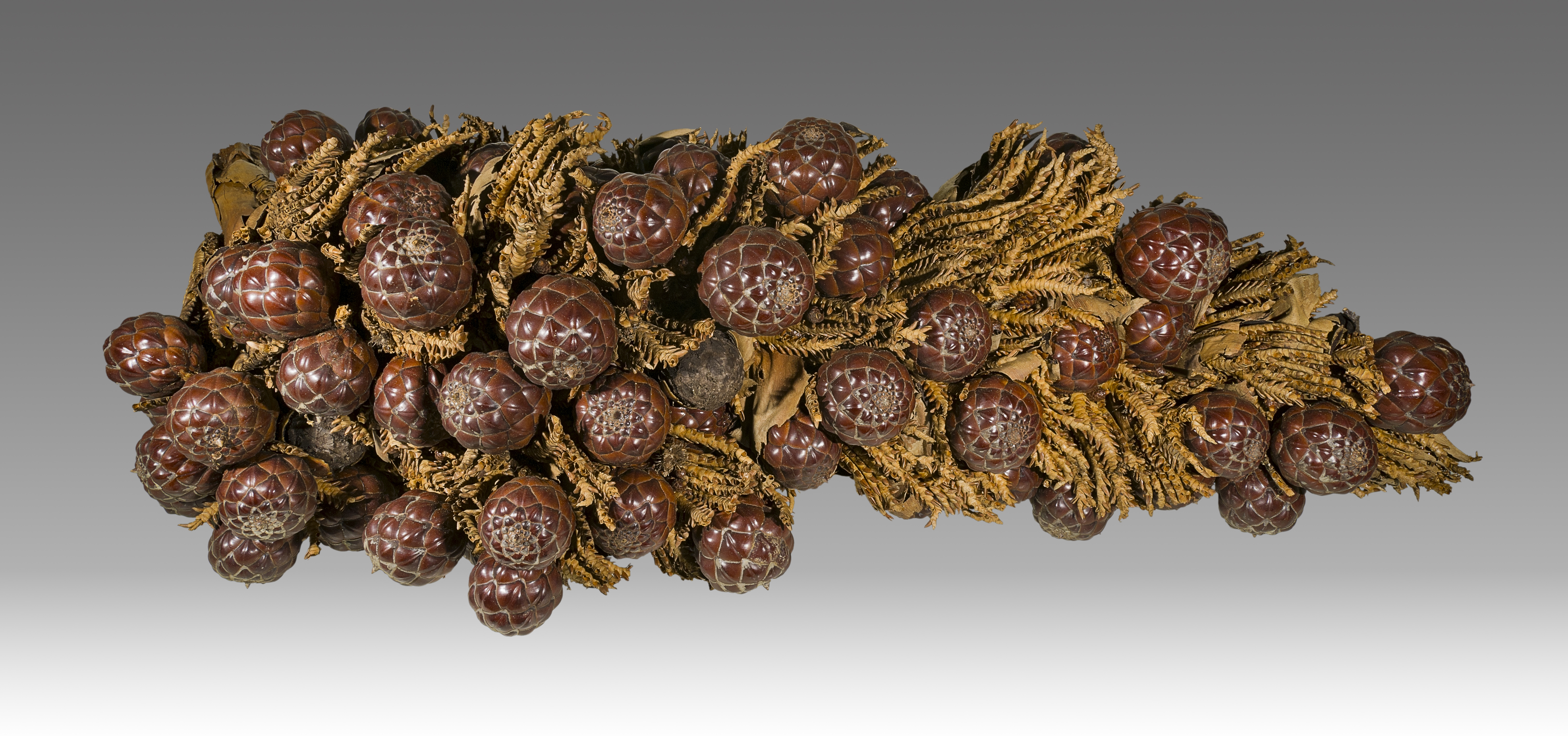
Raphia farinifera Balansa collection MHNT

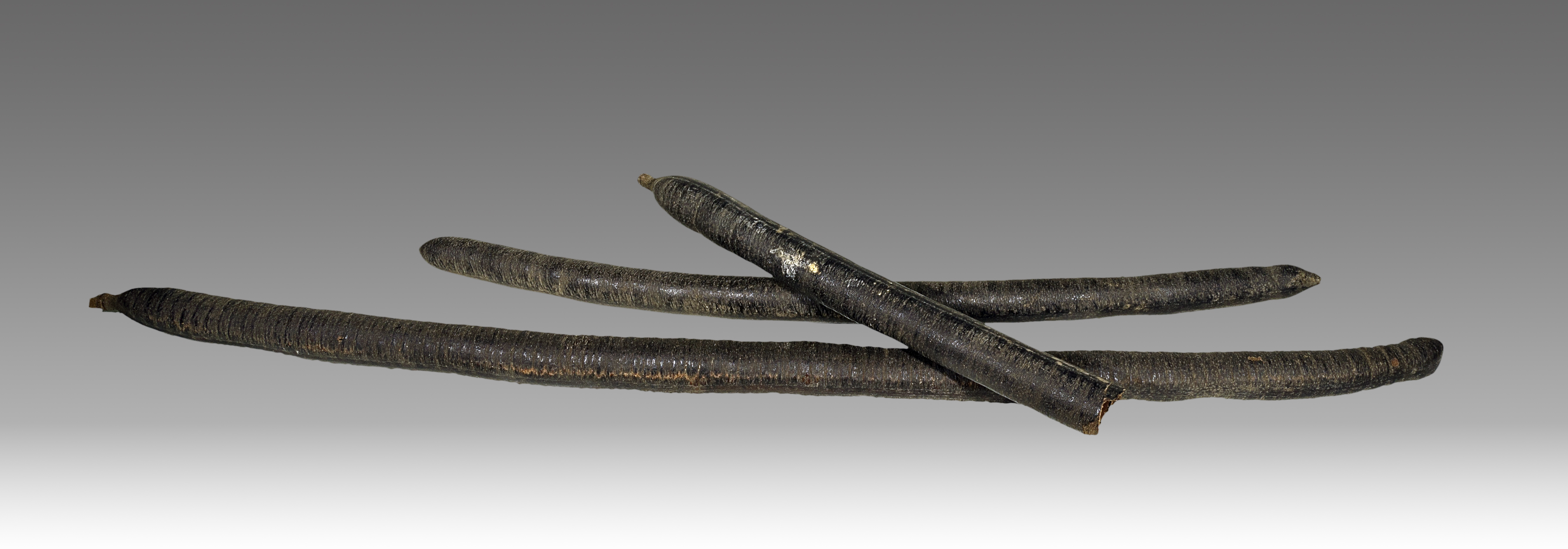
Cassia fistula Balansa collection MHNT

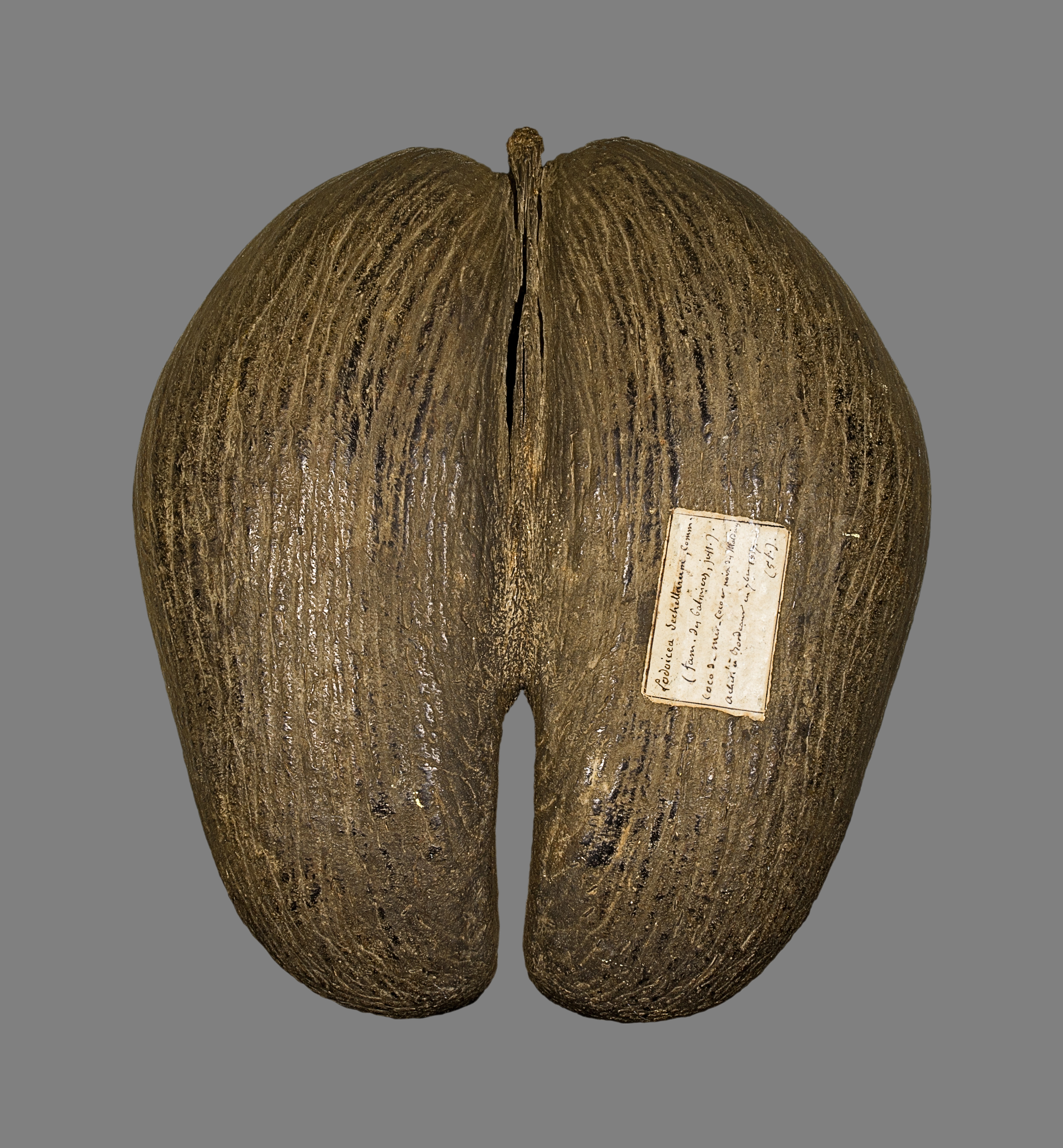
Lodoicea maldivica, Balansa collection MHNT

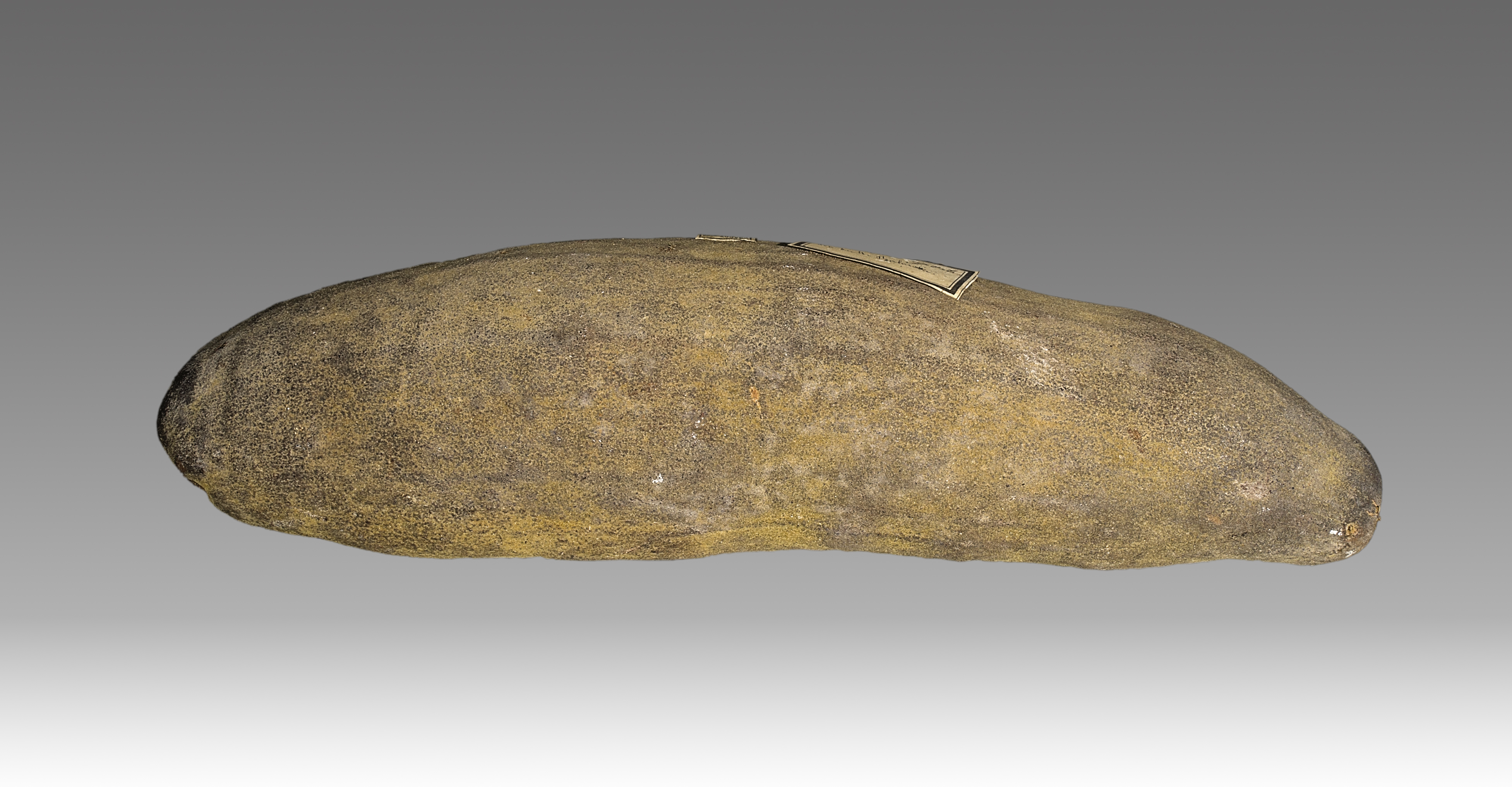
Adansonia digitata Balansa collection MHNT

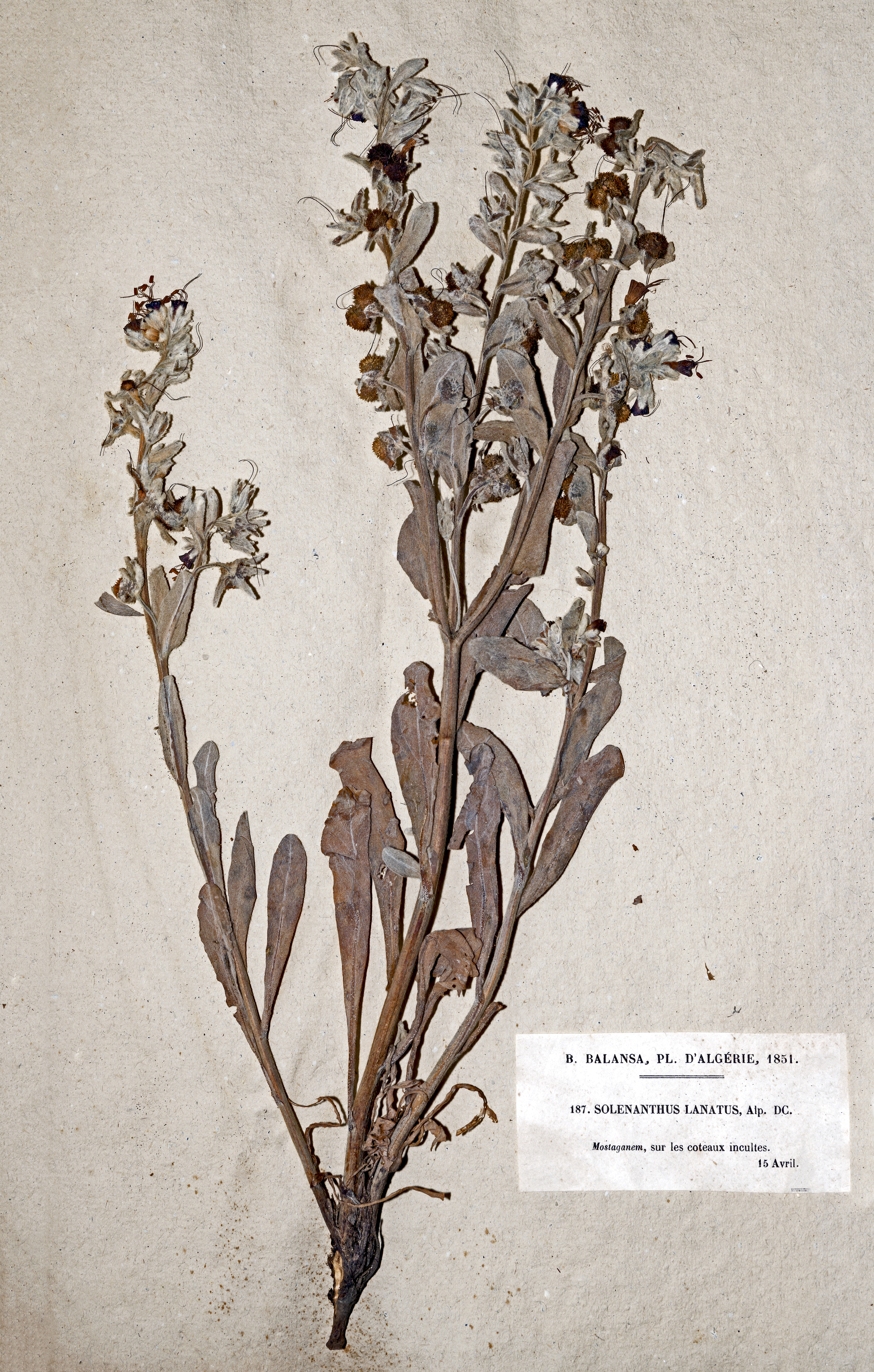
Solenanthus lanatus Balansa collection MHNT

== See also ==
- for pages named for Balansa
