= David Mabberley =

British born Australian botanist (born 1948)

David Mabberley AM
- Mabberley in 2004
- Born: May 1948 (age 78); Tetbury, Gloucestershire, England
- Other name: David John Mabberley
- Education: Rendcomb College; St Catherine's College, Oxford; Sidney Sussex College, Cambridge; St John's College, Oxford; Wadham College, Oxford
- Known for: The plant-book
- Awards: Engler Medal in Silver (2009); José Cuatrecasas Medal for Excellence in Tropical Botany; Linnean Medal
- Scientific career
- Fields: Botany
- Doctoral advisor: E. J. H. Corner
- Author abbrev. (botany): Mabb.

Professor David John Mabberley AM, (born May 1948) is a British-born Australian botanist, educator and writer. Among his varied scientific interests is the taxonomy of tropical plants, especially plants of the families Labiatae, Malvaceae, Meliaceae and Rutaceae (in particular Citrus). The third edition of his plant dictionary The plant-book. A portable dictionary of the vascular plants was published in 2008 as Mabberley's Plant-book, for which he was awarded the Engler Medal in Silver in 2009. As of June 2017 Mabberley's Plant-book is in its fourth edition.

== Biography ==
Born in Tetbury, Gloucestershire, England, Mabberley won a scholarship to Rendcomb College, Cirencester where he was inspired by biology master, Christopher Swaine, then an open scholarship to St Catherine's College, Oxford, where his tutor was Barrie Juniper and he graduated B.A. in 1970 and M.A. in 1974. The rest of the five making up his year in biology were Robin McCleery, John Moore-Bick, Stuart Pimm and Peter Taylor, with whom Mabberley organised the Oxford University Expedition to the Cherangani Hills, Kenya (1969). Although he was intended to work for a doctorate under the cytologist C. D. Darlington he was inspired to move to Sidney Sussex College, Cambridge, under the supervision of E. J. H. Corner, leading to a PhD in 1973 and D.Phil. (Oxon) in 1975. In 1973 Mabberley was elected the first Claridge Druce junior research fellow at St John's College, Oxford, before being appointed in 1976 to a tutorial fellowship at Wadham College, Oxford (linked to a university lecturership in the Department of Botany, later Plant Sciences, where he set up the "Mablab" with graduate students and post-doctoral research workers from around the world). Doctoral students included Alistair Hay, Martin Cheek, William Hawthorne, Rowan Jenkins, Balangoda Singhakumara and Rogier Petrus Johannes de Kok.

He served as Dean of Wadham College for many years. Mabberley was senior proctor at Oxford 1988–1989, later becoming Curator of the Oxford University Herbaria. He has also served in various capacities at numerous universities around the world, including University of Paris (France), University of Leiden (the Netherlands), University of Peradeniya (Sri Lanka), University of Kuwait, Western Sydney University and Macquarie University (both in New South Wales, Australia). From 1995 he held a chair at the University of Leiden, where he is now Emeritus Professor.

Mabberley moved to Australia late in 1996 and ran his own consultancy business there, one contract being as CEO of Greening Australia NSW. In 2004 he was appointed to the Orin and Althea Soest Chair in Horticultural Science at the University of Washington, Seattle, US, where he was also Professor of Economic Botany in the College of Forest Resources. During his tenure there, he oversaw the union of the Washington Park Arboretum, Center for Urban Horticulture, Union Bay Natural Area, Elisabeth C. Miller Library and Otis Douglas Hyde Herbarium as the University of Washington Botanic Gardens (now Seattle Botanic Gardens), of which he was the founding director. In March 2008 he took up the newly created position of Keeper of the Herbarium, Library, Art and Archives at the Royal Botanic Gardens, Kew.

Mabberley has performed fieldwork in many countries over several decades: Kenya (1969, 1970–71), Uganda (1970–71), Tanzania (1971–72), Madagascar (1971), Malaysia, Singapore & Indonesia (1974, 1981), Papua New Guinea (1974, 1989), Seychelles (1978), Panamá (1978–79), Portugal (1984–96), New Caledonia (1984), New Zealand (1990), Sri Lanka (1991), Hawai’i (1998), Cape York, Australia (Royal Geographical Society of Queensland expedition, 2002), Malaysia (2003, 2007), Vietnam (2005), China (2006, 2008), India (2019), Japan (2019).

During research for his PhD dissertation, he travelled widely and collected plants throughout eastern Africa and Madagascar (1970–2), making particularly significant pioneering collections in the Ukaguru Mountains, Tanzania, where he collected at least 14 species of plants (and one new snail species) new to science and restricted to that range. These include a species of coffee, a giant lobelia (Lobelia sancta (Campanulaceae)), a (hairy) balsam (Impatiens ukagurensis (Balsaminaceae)), besides Keetia davidii (Rubiaceae) and Senecio mabberleyi (Compositae), both named after him. He is also commemorated in Aglaia mabberleyana (Meliaceae) from Borneo, Begonia mabberleyana (Begoniaceae) from Sulawesi and Cinnamomum mabberleyi (Lauraceae) from Vietnam and Laos, besides Homalomena davidiana (Araceae) and Harpullia mabberleyana (Sapindaceae), both from New Guinea, Grewia mabberleyana (Malvaceae) from Madagascar and Hibiscus mabberleyi (Malvaceae) from Mauritius, but extinct in the wild.

In August 2011 Mabberley became executive director of the New South Wales Royal Botanic Gardens and Domain Trust, Australia. In this capacity he was responsible for the management of Sydney's Royal Botanic Garden and Domain, The National Herbarium of New South Wales, The Australian Botanic Garden at Mount Annan near Camden and The Blue Mountains Botanic Garden, Mount Tomah, today comprising Botanic Gardens of Sydney. He left the post in September 2013 and shortly afterwards was elected to an Emeritus fellowship at Wadham College, Oxford. In honour of his seventieth birthday, colleagues and former students prepared a Festschrift, presented to him at Singapore Botanic Gardens, 27 September 2019. In recognition of his work and achievements, he was appointed Director Emeritus, Botanic Gardens of Sydney in 2024.

His archive, especially that relating to Mabberley’s plant-book is housed at the National Botanic Garden of Wales, of which he was a Trustee 2008-2011 and is an Honorary Fellow since November 2018.

== Honours and awards ==
Among the awards he has received are the José Cuatrecasas Medal for Excellence in Tropical Botany and the Peter Raven Award (by the American Society of Plant Taxonomists "to a plant systematist who has made successful efforts to popularize botany to non-scientists"), both in 2004. In 2006 he was awarded the Linnean Medal of the Linnean Society of London and, in 2011, the Robert Allerton Award for Excellence in Tropical Botany of the National Tropical Botanical Garden, USA. He is a Corresponding Member, American Society of Plant Taxonomists (since 1999) and Fellow, Indian Botanical Society (since 2015).

From 1993 to 1996 he served as President of the Society for the History of Natural History, and in 2025 was awarded the society's Founders Medal.

In 2005 he was elected President of the IAPT, and in 2010 was elected the chairman of its General Committee.

In 2016 he was appointed a Member of the Order of Australia for significant service to horticultural science, particularly to plant taxonomy and tropical botany, as an academic, researcher and author.

In 2018 he was presented with the award of Doctor of Science (DSc honoris causa) by the Vice-Chancellor of Macquarie University in recognition of his outstanding contribution to horticultural science.

== Published books ==
- Citrus: A World History. D.J. Mabberley, 2024. Thames & Hudson, London & New York. Honored with the Awarded of Excellence in History by the Council on Botanical and Horticultural Libraries
- Proof engravings prepared for Sir Joseph Banks from plant drawings made by Sydney Parkinson on James Cook's Endeavour voyage [Memoirs of The Peter Crossing Collection 1]. D.J.Mabberley, 2024. Peter Crossing Collection, Greenwich, NSW.
- The Peter Crossing Collection: an illustrated catalogue. Pp. xiii + 357. Peter Crossing Collection, 2022. Greenwich, NSW.
- A Cultural History of Plants: Volumes 1-6. A. Giesecke & D.J. Mabberley (general eds), 2022. Bloomsbury, London, UK. Society of Economic Botany’s Daniel F. Austin Award 2022. Finalist in the Association of American Publishers’ Humanities Reference category of 2023 PROSE [Professional & Scholarly Excellence] Awards
- The Robert Brown Handbook: A guide to the life and work of Robert Brown (1773 - 1858), Scottish botanist. D.J. Mabberley & D.T. Moore, 2022. Koeltz Botanical Books, Glashütten, Germany.
- Botanical Revelation: European encounters Australian plants before Darwin. The Peter Crossing Collection. D.J. Mabberley, 2019. NewSouth, Sydney. Top Ten of 2020 books, Gardens Illustrated.
- The extraordinary story of the apple. B.E. Juniper & D.J. Mabberley, 2019. Royal Botanic Gardens Kew & Chicago University Press. Spanish edition (2020): La extraordinaria historia de la manzana (trans. Clara Galardi Labraza); German ed. (2022) Die Geschichte des Apfels: von der Wildfrucht zum Kulturgut (trans. Claudia Huber)
- 'Painting by numbers' - the life and art of Ferdinand Bauer. D.J. Mabberley, 2017. NewSouth, Kensington, New South Wales – awarded the 2018 Thackray Medal of the Society for the History of Natural History, London.
- Joseph Banks' Florilegium: Botanical Treasures from Cook's First Voyage. M. Gooding, D.J. Mabberley & J. Studholme, 2017. Thames & Hudson, London & New York [Italian edition 2017; compact edition 2019] - awarded American Botanical Council’s annual James A. Duke Excellence in Botanical Literature Award for 2017; shortlisted for Apollo Awards Book of the Year 2018; 2019 Award of Excellence in Botanical Art and Illustration from The Council on Botanical and Horticultural Libraries.
- Mabberley's plant-book. A portable dictionary of plants, their classification and uses, fourth edition. D.J. Mabberley, 2017. Cambridge University Press.
- La carta de colores de Haenke de la Expedición Malaspina: un enigma - Haenke's Malaspina colour-chart: an enigma. D. J. Mabberley & M. P. de San Pío Aladrén. 2012. Real Jardín Botánico, CSIC, Madrid, Spain.
- Mabberley's plant-book. A portable dictionary of plants, their classification and uses, third edition. D.J. Mabberley, 2008. Reprinted with corrections 2009, 2014. Cambridge University Press. Awarded American Botanical Council’s annual James A. Duke Excellence in Botanical Literature Award for 2008 and IAPT’S Engler Medal in Silver 2009.
- The story of the apple. B. E. Juniper & D. J. Mabberley. 2006. Timber Press, Portland, Oregon, US & Cambridge, UK.
- Arthur Harry Church: the anatomy of flowers. D. J. Mabberley. 2000. Merrell & The Natural History Museum, London.
- Ferdinand Bauer: the nature of discovery. D. J. Mabberley. 1999. Merrell Holberton & The Natural History Museum, London.
- Paradisus: Hawaiian plant watercolors by Geraldine King Tam. D. J. Mabberley. 1999 ['1998']). Honolulu Academy of Arts, Honolulu, Hawai'i, US.
- The Flora Graeca Story. Sibthorp, Bauer and Hawkins in the Levant. H. W. Lack & D. J. Mabberley. 1998 ['1999']. Oxford University Press - awarded OPTIMA Silver Medal 2001.
- An exquisite eye: The Australian flora and fauna drawings 1801-1820 of Ferdinand Bauer. P. Watts, J. A. Pomfret & D. J. Mabberley. 1997. Historic Houses Trust of New South Wales. Glebe, New South Wales, Australia.
- The plant-book. A portable dictionary of the vascular plants, second edition. D. J. Mabberley, 1997. Cambridge University Press, UK.
- Meliaceae. In: Foundation Flora Malesiana (Editor). Flora Malesiana, Series 1, Volume 12. D. J. Mabberley, C.M. Pannell & A.M. Sing, 1995. Rijksherbarium/Hortus Botanicus, Leiden University, Leiden, Netherlands.
- Algarve plants and landscape. Passing tradition and ecological change. D. J. Mabberley & P. J. Placito. 1993. Oxford University Press.
- Tropical rain forest ecology, second edition. D. J. Mabberley, 1991. Blackie, Glasgow. Incorporated into the British National Corpus.
- The plant-book. A portable dictionary of the higher plants. D. J. Mabberley, 1987. Cambridge University Press.
- Jupiter botanicus. Robert Brown of the British Museum. D. J. Mabberley, 1985. Cramer, Braunschweig & British Museum (Natural History), London.
- Tropical rain forest ecology. D. J. Mabberley, 1983. Blackie, Glasgow.
- Revolutionary botany. Thalassiophyta and other essays of A. H. Church. D. J. Mabberley, (Ed.) 1981. Clarendon, Oxford.
- Tropical botany. Essays presented to E. J. H. Corner for his seventieth birthday. D. J. Mabberley & C. K. Lan (Eds.). 1977. Botanic Gardens, Singapore.
