= Miracinonyx =

Miracinonyx Temporal range: Pliocene-Pleistocene ~3.1–0.016 Ma
- Lower jaw of Miracinonyx trumani (bottom) from the Natural Trap Cave of Wyoming

Scientific classification
- Kingdom: Animalia
- Phylum: Chordata
- Class: Mammalia
- Order: Carnivora
- Family: Felidae
- Subfamily: Felinae
- Genus: †Miracinonyx; Adams, 1979

Type species
- †Felis trumani Orr, 1969

Species
- †M. trumani (Orr, 1969); †M. inexpectatus (Cope, 1895)

Synonyms
- M. trumani synonymy: Felis trumani Orr, 1969; Acinonyx (Miracinonyx) trumani (Orr, 1969); Puma (Miracinonyx) trumani (Orr, 1969); M. inexpectatus synonymy: Crocuta inexpectata Cope, 1895; Uncia inexpectata (Cope, 1895) sensu Cope, 1899; Felis cougar Brown, 1908; Felis longicrus Brown, 1908; Felis longricus (Brown, 1908) sensu Van Valkenburgh et al., 1990 (lapsus calami); Smilodontopsis mooreheadi Hay, 1920; Felis (Puma) inexpectata (Cope, 1895); Felis (Puma) studeri Savage, 1960; Acinonyx (Miracinonyx) studeri (Savage, 1960); Puma (Miracinonyx) inexpectata (Cope, 1895)

Extinct genus of mammal

Miracinonyx, colloquially known as the American cheetah, is an extinct genus of cat that was native to North America during the Pliocene and Pleistocene epochs (about 3.1 million to 16,000 years ago). It was a relatively large feline, estimated to have weighed 50–95 kg (110–209 lb), and may have been capable of hunting larger prey than the smaller modern cheetah. Its closest living relative is the cougar, while its anatomical similarities to the modern cheetah, including large nostrils and long legs adapted for cursoriality (specialization in running), are possibly a result of convergent evolution, the independent development of analogous physical traits due to similar environmental pressures. Unlike the modern cheetah, however, Miracinonyx had fully retractable claws and relatively robust legs.

The first fossils ascribed to Miracinonyx were described by the American paleontologist Edward Drinker Cope in the late 19th century, who thought the remains belonged to an extinct relative of the spotted hyena or snow leopard. In 1979, American paleontologist Daniel B. Adams named Miracinonyx as a subgenus of Acinonyx, the genus that includes the modern cheetah, with M. trumani as the type species. In 1990, American paleontologist Blaire Van Valkenburgh and colleagues considered Miracinonyx as a distinct genus, and re-evaluated the fossils described by Cope as belonging to an older species of the same genus, M. inexpectatus. Alternatively, Miracinonyx may represent a subgenus of Puma, the genus that includes the cougar, on the basis of genetic evidence supporting a close relationship.

M. inexpectatus lived between the Late Pliocene and Middle Pleistocene (Blancan and Irvingtonian faunal stages), from 3.1 to 0.6 million years ago, while M. trumani lived during the Late Pleistocene (Rancholabrean faunal stage), between 52,000 and 16,000 years ago. The fossils of Miracinonyx were known from the United States, Mexico and Yukon, Canada. Paleontologists initially considered this taxon to be specialized in chasing down cursorial herbivores like the pronghorn on open grasslands. However, isotopic analysis and fossil discoveries from diverse environments, including the mountainous terrain of Grand Canyon and the Arctic habitats of Yukon, suggested that Miracinonyx likely had a broader diet than previously thought.

== Taxonomy ==
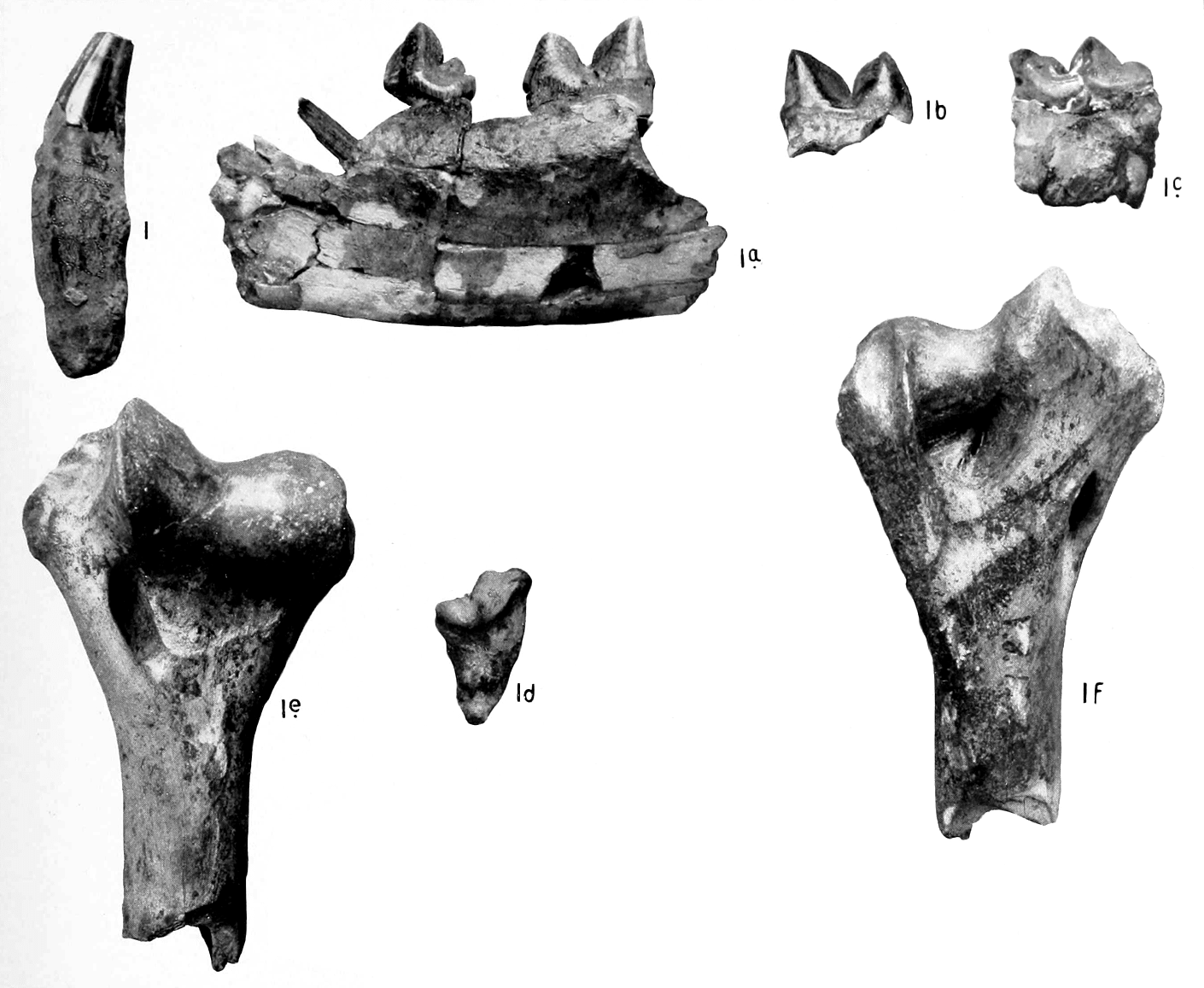
Holotype (name-bearing specimen) and other specimens of M. inexpectatus figured by Edward Drinker Cope in 1899

Between 1894 and 1896, American scientist Samuel Gibson Dixon and American archaeologist Henry Chapman Mercer, with the assistance of S. N. Rhoads and D. N. McCadden, discovered various vertebrate fossils from the Port Kennedy Bone Cave of Port Kennedy, Pennsylvania, dated to the late Early to Middle Pleistocene (Irvingtonian faunal stage), approximately between 1 and 0.7 million years ago. In an 1895 paper, American paleontologist Edward Drinker Cope described a single tooth found in this excavation as Crocuta inexpectata, a new species within the genus that includes the spotted hyena. The Latin word 'inexpectatus' ('inexpectata' in feminine form) means "unlooked for". Cope identified the tooth as a right lower carnassial tooth (first lower molar tooth) and suggested that the absence of a metaconid, a cusp (raised point) on the front, inner corner of a lower molar tooth, was a shared characteristic with the genus Crocuta, though he expressed uncertainty in his classification and noted that the tooth may potentially belong to Nimravus, an extinct genus of feliforms (cat-like carnivorans).

In his posthumous 1899 publication, Cope assigned other fossils from the same excavation to the species and reclassified the holotype tooth, accessioned as ANSP 52, as a right upper carnassial tooth (fourth upper premolar tooth) of an extinct felid. He renamed the species as Uncia inexpectata, assigning it within the genus Uncia, which included the snow leopard and is now considered synonymous with the genus Panthera. The assigned specimens included a right lower jaw fragment, two lower and one upper carnassial teeth, two first premolar teeth, three incisor teeth from the lower jaw, canine tooth from the upper jaw, two humerus bones (upper arm bone), metacarpal bones (palm bones) and phalanges (toe bones). Cope compared the teeth with those of Uncia, and suggested similarities in the sharp edge of the metaconid, robustness of the premolar tooth crown and shape of the metacone, a cusp on the back, outer corner of an upper molar, with an equivalent cusp on the fourth upper premolar of carnivorans.

Lower jaw with teeth of Felis cougar (left) and premolar tooth of F. longicrus (right), two junior synonyms of M. inexpectatus

In 1929 and 1941, American paleontologist George Gaylord Simpson reported more Pleistocene fossil material of U. inexpectata that was found in Florida, Maryland and Arkansas. He considered the species to be more closely related to the cougar based on the similar shape of the jaw and the relatively small size of the fourth premolar compared to that of the first molar, and thus reassigned U. inexpectata as Felis (Puma) inexpectata. He also recognized two fossil species of Felis described by the American paleontologist Barnum Brown in 1908, F. cougar known from a lower jaw fragment and F. longicrus known from an isolated fourth premolar, and a putative species of saber-toothed cat described by the American paleontologist Oliver Perry Hay in 1920 based on an isolated fourth premolar, Smilodontopsis mooreheadi, as junior synonyms of F. inexpectata. In 1960, American paleontologist Donald E. Savage described Felis (Puma) studeri based on the rear portion of a skull, accessioned as WT 629, recovered from the Cita Canyon in Randall County, Texas, dated to the Late Pliocene-earliest Pleistocene (Blancan faunal stage). He also assigned a palate (roof of the mouth), accessioned as WT 563, left and right upper jaws, accessioned as UCMP 45953, and three lower jaws with teeth, each accessioned as WT 1218, WT 1236 and UCMP 47058. In a 1976 review of Late Pliocene-Pleistocene feline fossils from North America, Finnish paleontologist Björn Kurtén considered F. inexpectata and F. studeri to be the same species, with F. inexpectata having priority, but tentatively suggested that S. mooreheadi represents a fossil of a cougar.

View inside the Natural Trap Cave of Wyoming

In 1957, American archaeologist Phil C. Orr and James W. Calhoun, then director of the Nevada State Museum, Carson City, discovered fossils of an extinct felid from the Late Pleistocene (Rancholabrean faunal stage) Crypt Cave in Pershing County, Nevada: complete skull without second premolar, lower jaw without incisor teeth and partial postcranial skeleton consisting of neck vertebrae, thoracic vertebrae (spine segment that forms the upper back), rib bones and left scapula (shoulder blade). In 1969, Orr named a new species Felis trumani in honor of Orley H. Truman, then president of the Western Speleological Institute (WSI) in Santa Barbara, California, based on the specimen he discovered with Calhoun, accessioned as WSI P3a/450 and radiocarbon dated to 19,750 ± 650 years Before Present (BP).

In 1979, American paleontologist Daniel B. Adams named Miracinonyx as a new subgenus of the genus Acinonyx, with F. trumani as the type species: Acinonyx (Miracinonyx) trumani. The subgeneric name, Miracinonyx, is derived from the Latin word mirus ('surprising') and the genus Acinonyx which includes the modern cheetah (A. jubatus). He assigned specimens from the Natural Trap Cave, a pit cave near Lovell, Wyoming in the Bighorn Mountains, housed in the University of Kansas Vertebrate Paleontology (KUVP) collection, including skull and postcranial material representing at least six individuals of this species. Adams also included F. studeri as a second species of Miracinonyx, assigned to as Acinonyx (Miracinonyx) studeri. While he recognized Kurtén's proposed synonymy, Adams considered F. inexpectata as a nomen dubium (dubious name) because the fragmentary fourth premolar of the holotype made definitive classification difficult. In 1990, American paleontologist Blaire Van Valkenburgh and colleagues compared the specimens assigned to Miracinonyx with the specimens of cougar and Acinonyx, and reassigned Miracinonyx as a distinct genus based on differences in anatomical features. They also suggested that S. mooreheadi and "F." studeri were synonymous with "F." inexpectata, the latter of which was reassigned to M. inexpectatus.

=== Evolution ===
It is uncertain how M. inexpectatus evolved into M. trumani due to the temporal gap between the youngest known fossils of M. inexpectatus and the oldest of M. trumani. The youngest known fossils of M. inexpectatus are from the Conard Fissure in Newton County, Arkansas, consisting of teeth, partial skull and arm bone fragments dated to approximately 600,000 years ago, and possibly the oldest known fossil of M. trumani is from the Mineral Hill Cave in Elko County, Nevada, the fifth metatarsal bone (foot bone between ankle and toes) assigned to cf. ('compares well to') M. trumani and radiocarbon dated to approximately 52,200 years BP.^{MEGA14C} It is possible that the genus rapidly developed changes in body size and structure within this temporal gap, or that M. trumani evolved from an unknown species of Miracinonyx.

In 1977, American paleontologist Larry Martin and colleagues argued that M. trumani was a close relative of the cougar based on similarities in the shapes of muscle attachment sites and skeletal anatomy, and that its cheetah-like characteristics were independently evolved adaptations. However, Adams claimed in a 1979 paper that the cheetah originated from North America and migrated to Africa and Eurasia based on its proposed close relationship with Miracinonyx. Van Valkenburgh and colleagues contended in 1990 that the similarities between Miracinonyx and Acinonyx may have instead been a result of convergent evolution (independent evolution of analogous traits under similar environmental pressures). In a 2005 analysis of a mitochondrial DNA sample of M. trumani, American geneticist Ross Barnett and colleagues found that the taxon is most closely related to the cougar and not to the modern cheetah of Africa and Asia. In support of the proposed close relationship between the cougar and M. trumani by Barnett and colleagues, Argentine researcher Nicolás R. Chimento and colleagues considered Miracinonyx as a subgenus of the genus Puma in 2014. They assigned species of Miracinonyx to as Puma (Miracinonyx) trumani and Puma (Miracinonyx) inexpectata, and suggested that "F." studeri was possibly a subspecies of the latter, Puma (Miracinonyx) inexpectata studeri.

In a 2015 genomic analysis of the modern cheetah, Russian geneticist Pavel Dobrynin and colleagues found that the cheetah had two population bottlenecks (extreme reductions in population size caused by environmental factors) during the Late Pleistocene, at approximately 100,000 years ago and 12,000-10,000 years ago. They suggested that the first bottleneck was possibly associated with the cheetahs' migration from North America to Africa and Eurasia, during which repeated population reductions and territorial behavior may have restricted gene flow, increased inbreeding and reduced genetic diversity. Danish biologist Søren Faurby and colleagues criticized this claim in 2016, arguing that Miracinonyx and Acinonyx had no geographical overlap and were probably not closely related as indicated by Barnett and colleagues' mitochondrial genome analysis, so the first bottleneck of cheetahs cannot be explained by the supposed, unlikely immigration from North America. In response to Faurby and colleagues, American geneticist Stephen J. O'Brien and colleagues contended in the same year that a close relationship between the two genera cannot be ruled out, and that their similarities cannot be attributed solely to convergent evolution.

In 2026, American geneticist Molly Cassatt-Johnstone and colleagues examined the mitochondrial and nuclear genomes of M. trumani, which were obtained from three specimens found in the Quartz Creek and Bluefish Caves of Yukon, Canada and from one specimen found in the Natural Trap Cave of Wyoming, United States. The specimens from Yukon and Wyoming had very similar genomes, indicating that the species had low genetic diversity across its populations, and that the populations from each region likely diverged in the Late Pleistocene, so the expansion of its range to Yukon was relatively recent. The Yukon specimens also showed evidence of loss-of-function mutation, a genetic change that partially or totally inactivates the function of the gene product, specifically for genes involved in circadian rhythm regulation, which are consistent with modern mammals that live in high latitudes. The authors' genome analysis also confidently supported that the cougar is the closest relative of M. trumani, and that the estimated time of divergence between each of their lineage is approximately 2.6 million years ago. The simplified version of their maximum-likelihood phylogenetic analysis is displayed in the cladogram below.^{Figure S1}

- Felidae
  - - - - - - - Miracinonyx trumani
              - Puma concolor
            - - Puma yagouaroundi
          - - Acinonyx jubatus
        - - Lynx spp. ('species')
      - - - Felis nigripes
          - Felis catus
        - Prionailurus bengalensis
    - - Leopardus pardalis
  - - Panthera leo
    - Panthera onca

== Description ==
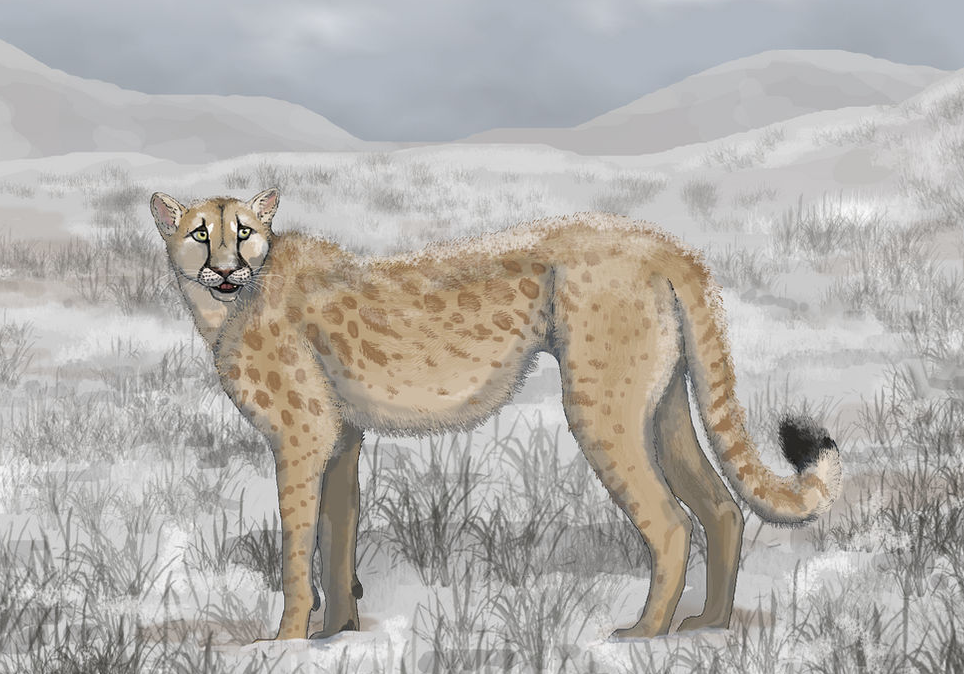
Hypothetical life restoration of M. trumani

Miracinonyx was larger than the modern cheetah. In 1979, Adams claimed that the largest individuals of Miracinonyx would have weighed up to 95 kg (209 lb). Van Valkenburgh and colleagues estimated the size of M. inexpectatus in 1990 based on a relatively complete skeleton from the Hamilton Cave of Pendleton County, West Virginia: skull length of 19.6 cm (7.7 in), backbone length (excluding the tail) of 106 cm (3 ft 6 in), tail length of 85–90 cm (2 ft 9 in – 2 ft 11 in) and body mass of 70 kg (150 lb). The same specimen was estimated to have stood 85 cm (2 ft 9 in) tall at the shoulder by the American paleontologist Alan Turner in 1997. The species was also likely comparable in size to Acinonyx pardinensis, a large extinct relative of the modern cheetah that weighed up to 100 kg (220 lb). The skull length and body mass of M. trumani were estimated around 17.7–18.2 cm (7.0–7.2 in),^{Table S1} and 50–88 kg (110–194 lb), respectively.^{MOMv3.3}

=== Skull and limb morphology ===
Anatomical similarities between Miracinonyx and Acinonyx include enlarged nares and elongated distal (farther from the attachment point) portion of the limbs, which may have been adaptations for enhanced air intake and high speed during pursuit predation. Unlike the cougar, both taxa have a shortened face, broad frontal bone (a bone that forms the forehead), arched (rounded at the top) forehead, reduced canine teeth and small postcanine gap. Additionally, the protocone, a cusp on the front, inner corner of an upper molar, with an equivalent cusp on the fourth upper premolar of carnivorans, was extremely reduced on the fourth upper premolar of Miracinonyx and Acinonyx, compared to those of other felids.

Although Miracinonyx and the modern cheetah shared similarities in skull morphology and elongated distal limb segments, they differed in certain anatomical features. The postorbital processes, bony projections on the skull located behind the eye socket, on the frontal bone of Miracinonyx were less rounded in shape than those of Acinonyx. The radial tuberosity, the bony projection on the radius (outer large bone of the forearm) where the biceps muscle attaches, was significantly larger in Miracinonyx than in the modern cheetah, suggesting that Miracinonyx likely had stronger forelimbs capable of greater rotational movement of the forearm. The muscle attachment sites on the tibia (shin bone) also indicated that Miracinonyx had more muscular hindlimbs than the modern cheetah. The fibula (calf bone) and tibia were fused in the modern cheetah but remained separate in Miracinonyx, potentially allowing greater ankle mobility for the latter.

Heel bone (left) and metacarpal (right) of M. trumani

Principal component analysis (PCA), a statistical method that summarizes and visualizes variation in complex datasets using graph axes called principal components, was applied to linear measurements of carnivoran heel bones. The analysis showed that Miracinonyx and the modern cheetah had positive scores on the first and second principal components (PC1 and PC2), representing the horizontal and vertical axes, respectively. PCA was also applied to anatomical landmarks, specific reference points on bones used to compare their shapes, and showed that both taxa had negative scores on PC1 and positive scores on PC2. These similarities may suggest that Miracinonyx shared certain heel bone proportions with the modern cheetah, potentially reflecting similar locomotor adaptations. The heel bone of M. inexpectatus was longer than that of M. trumani, but shorter than that of A. pardinensis.

The angle formed by the trapezium and trapezoid bones, the wrist bones associated with the bases of the thumb and index fingers, with the unciform bone, the wrist bone associated with the bases of the ring and little fingers, was more acute in M. trumani than in the modern cheetah, but did not differ significantly from that of the lion. The angle between the radius and magnum bone, the wrist bone associated with the base of the middle finger, was less obtuse in M. trumani than in the cougar. The trochlear crest of the humerus, a raised ridge of the elbow joint, projected farther distally in M. trumani than in the modern cheetah but less than in the cougar. The capitulum, the rounded part of the humerus that connects with the radius, was more curved in M. trumani than in the cougar but less than in the modern cheetah.

The hood of the distal phalanges, the bony tissue forming the recess (hollow space) that encloses and anchors the root of the claw sheath, was relatively reduced in the modern cheetah, which has only partially retractable claws, compared with other felids, including both M. inexpectatus and M. trumani. This difference suggested that Miracinonyx probably had fully retractable claws, as in most other felids. A distal phalanx of a juvenile M. trumani, preserved with the keratinous claw sheath and fleshy hood intact in the retracted position, provided direct evidence that it had retractable claws.

=== Skeletal proportion and vertebral morphology ===
3D scans of the femur (upper left), ulna (upper right), humerus (lower left) and hip bone (lower right) of M. inexpectatus

Both species of Miracinonyx had similar skeletal morphology, but differed in size and robustness of their skeleton. The radius of M. inexpectatus was longer than that of M. trumani, but shorter than that of A. pardinensis. The humerus, tibia and femur (thigh bone) of A. pardinensis were slightly shorter than those of M. inexpectatus, but longer than those of M. trumani. The same bones in both the modern cheetah and cougar were shorter than those of M. trumani. The ratio between the length of the radius and humerus in M. inexpectatus was approximately 0.90, identical to that of the cougar but lower than those of M. trumani and Acinonyx, at 0.97 and 1.0 respectively. The distal ulna (inner large bone of the forearm) of M. inexpectatus was more robust than those of the modern cheetah and M. trumani, but more gracile than that of the cougar. The ulna of the cougar was wider at the trochlear notch (a large hollow area at the upper end of the ulna) and shorter in total length than that of M. trumani.

The ratio between the length of the tibia and femur in both M. inexpectatus and M. trumani were about 0.95, intermediate between those of the cougar and Acinonyx, at 0.90 and 1.0 respectively. The body of femur was relatively straight in the cougar and M. trumani, while the corresponding structure in Acinonyx was more curved towards the front. The kneecap of M. inexpectatus was shorter than that of M. trumani, longer than those of the modern cheetah and cougar, and wider than those of all three species. The right hip bone of M. inexpectatus was relatively straight, unlike the kinked (sharply bent) hip bone of Acinonyx. The metacarpal bones of M. inexpectatus were generally longer than those of M. trumani, but the length of the fourth metacarpal bone of M. trumani fell within the range of variation observed in M. inexpectatus. The third metacarpal bone of M. trumani was longer than those of the modern cheetah and cougar. The second, third and fourth metatarsal bones of M. inexpectatus were longer than those of M. trumani and shorter than those of A. pardinensis, while the fifth metatarsal bone of A. pardinensis was slightly shorter than that of M. inexpecatus and longer than that of M. trumani. The third and fourth metatarsal bones of M. trumani were longer than those of the modern cheetah and cougar.

The ratio between the length of the lumbar vertebrae (spine segment that forms the lower back) and thoracic vertebrae was 0.78 in the cougar, 0.90 in M. inexpectatus, and 0.97-1.0 in M. trumani and the modern cheetah. Both M. trumani and the modern cheetah have a relatively long lumbar region, which in the cheetah likely represents an adaptation for increased spinal flexion, facilitating high-speed locomotion and longer strides. On the 7th lumbar vertebra of M. trumani and the modern cheetah, the transverse processes, small bony projections extending from each side of the vertebra, were shorter than those of the preceding lumbar vertebrae and directed more towards the front, unlike those of other felids, including both the cougar and M. inexpectatus.

== Paleobiology ==
Adams thought that the shared skull characteristics and proportions of Miracinonyx and Acinonyx indicated a close evolutionary relationship between the two, while regarding differences in limb structure as primitive traits of the former. Van Valkenburgh and colleagues argued that the similarities in cranial and limb morphology cannot be used to support Adams' conclusion, as they could instead be independently evolved adaptations for cursoriality (specialization in running) in distantly related and geographically separated carnivores due to similar ecological pressures rather than shared ancestry.

=== Brain ===
Brain endocast of the cheetah (top), M. trumani (middle) and cougar (bottom)

In 2022, Spanish paleontologist Borja Figueirido and colleagues compared the brain endocast of M. trumani to that of other felids, and found that the general brain shape of the modern cheetah was more highly domed (curved more upward) than that of M. trumani. They estimated the total endocranial volume (the internal capacity of the braincase) of M. trumani to be higher than that of the cheetah, the latter of which has the smallest brain size relative to total body size among living felids. The authors claimed that M. trumani may not have been as cursorial as the modern cheetah, under the assumption that the relatively small brain size of the latter was an adaptation to conserve energy and reduce body weight. The somatosensory cortex and visual cortex, the region of the brain that processes sensory information from the body and visual information respectively, were more developed in M. trumani than in the cougar, which would indicate that M. trumani may have relied more on eyesight than the cougar to detect prey due to enhanced vision. The auditory cortex, the region of the brain that processes sound, was more expanded in M. trumani than in the cougar, so the former possibly had better perception of sound as well.

Figueirido and colleagues also estimated the paranasal sinuses (air-filled spaces within the bones of the skull and face) volume of M. trumani, and compared it to that of the cougar and cheetah. The size of paranasal sinuses relative to the total cranium volume was 25% larger in the cheetah, but only 15-20% larger in the cougar and M. trumani. The authors argued that the larger, more vascularized (containing more blood vessels) paranasal sinuses of the cheetah were likely an adaptation to prevent the brain from overheating during high-speed chases. Thus, the relatively reduced paranasal sinuses volume of M. trumani may indicate that it did not run as fast as the modern cheetah, or that it did not need to evolve those specializations as North America during the Pleistocene was colder than the current, warmer habitats of the modern cheetah in Africa and Iran. They further proposed that skeletal adaptations for high-speed locomotion in M. trumani may have developed before modifications in its brain structure, given the similarities in the limbs and differences in the brain and sinuses between M. trumani and the modern cheetah.

=== Diet and competition ===
Hypothetical life restoration of a running M. inexpectatus

M. inexpectatus likely occupied an ecological niche that overlapped with those of other large carnivorans in the open habitats of Pleistocene North America. Isotopic analysis of carnivorans from the Middle Pleistocene of Fairmead Landfill in Fairmead, California suggested that M. inexpectatus and other predators from this region primarily consumed herbivores that grazed on open prairies. Contemporary herbivorous mammals from the Fairmead Landfill were the antilocaprids Capromeryx and Tetrameryx, horse Equus, large camelids Camelops and Hemiauchenia, peccary Platygonus, ground sloth Paramylodon, Columbian mammoth and white-tailed deer. The carbon isotope values of M. inexpectatus were similar to those of the saber-toothed cat Smilodon and dire wolves, indicating dietary overlap and possible competition for the same prey. In contrast, its carbon isotope values were higher than those of the scimitar-toothed cat Homotherium, suggesting differences in their diets and potentially reduced competition. Fossils of jaguars and Smilodon have also been found in association with M. inexpectatus from various fossil sites, including the Conard Fissure of Newton County, Arkansas, Hamilton Cave of Pendleton County, West Virginia, and Port Kennedy Bone Cave of Port Kennedy, Pennsylvania. Like extant African felids such as cheetahs, leopards and lions, these three North American felids may have coexisted through niche partitioning. M. inexpectatus probably occupied grassy meadows within forests, whereas jaguars favored forests associated with river systems or wetlands and Smilodon likely inhabited both types of environments.

Isotopic differentiation of M. trumani relative to coeval North American fauna (WY: Wyoming; YT: Yukon Territory)

M. trumani may have been able to hunt larger prey than the modern cheetah. A 47 kg (104 lb) modern cheetah and 88 kg (194 lb) M. trumani were estimated to be capable of hunting prey weighing up to 213.5 kg (471 lb) and 372 kg (820 lb), respectively. M. trumani was probably a generalist predator, with regional differences in diet indicated by variations in carbon and nitrogen isotope compositions between specimens from Yukon and Wyoming. The isotopic values of the Wyoming specimens overlapped with those of large, contemporary carnivores like wolves, bears and American lions, indicating that M. trumani may have had a similar niche and hunted the same prey which inhabited temperate grasslands. Isotopic analysis also suggested that M. trumani from Wyoming preyed not only on pronghorns, but also on larger herbivores such as the bighorn sheep, bison and horses like Equus and Haringtonhippus.

In contrast, the Yukon specimens exhibited ~6% higher nitrogen isotope values than contemporary terrestrial carnivores and herbivores. These values fell within the range observed in piscivores (fish-eaters), so the Yukon population was likely specialized in hunting aquatic prey, potentially including anadromous fish like salmons which migrate from the sea to the freshwater to spawn. In Yukon, M. trumani would have experienced harsh winters and coexisted with numerous large carnivores, including the giant short-faced bear Arctodus, scimitar-toothed cat Homotherium, cave lion Panthera spelaea, brown bears and wolves, so the population likely evolved such strategy to reduce competition with other predators. M. trumani also coexisted with large herbivorous mammals of the mammoth steppe in Yukon, including the woolly mammoth, Yukon horse, steppe bison, muskox, moose, wapiti, caribou, dall sheep and saiga. In the Grand Canyon of Arizona, M. trumani inhabited high-altitude mountainous environments and may have preyed on bighorn sheep and Harrington's mountain goat, whose fossils were the most abundant among ungulates in this region. Puncture marks found on the skull, lower jaw and backbone of the subadult specimen from the Grand Canyon matched the shape and spacing of the canine teeth in M. trumani, suggesting that the species also engaged in conspecific aggression, fighting between members of the same species.

=== Disputed theory of evolutionary arms race ===
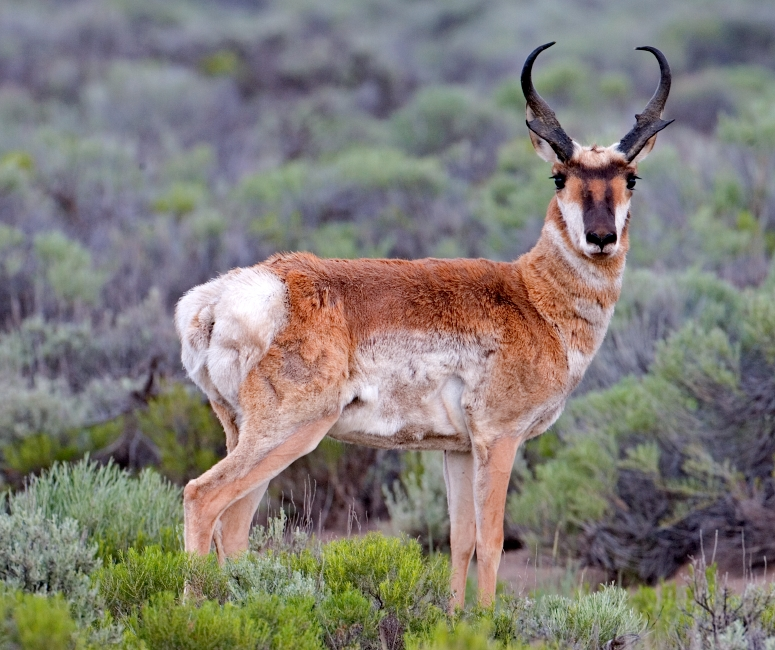
Adult male pronghorn, one of the prey sources of Miracinonyx

In 1988, American paleontologist John Chorn and colleagues reported fossils of modern pronghorns from the Natural Trap Cave of Wyoming and argued that the pronghorns developed adaptations for high speeds to escape from the contemporary M. trumani, whose fossils were the second most abundant among predators in the cave after those of wolves. The authors claimed that M. trumani and the modern cheetah filled the same ecological role and niche, preferably preying on relatively small, fast-running ungulates. Furthermore, they proposed that M. trumani and the pronghorns evolved cursoriality through an evolutionary arms race, a competition between two groups of organisms developing adaptations and counter-adaptations against each other over generations. In 1997, American biologist John A. Byers argued that pursuit predators, particularly the species of Miracinonyx, were the primary reason that caused the selection for cursorial adaptations in the species of Antilocapra, the genus that includes the modern pronghorn. This theory was depicted in the 2002 six-part BBC nature documentary Wild New World, which focused on the Pleistocene megafauna of North America.

However, American biologist Gina M. Semprebon and French paleontologist Florent Rivals disagreed with Byers' theory in 2007. The authors contended that the Antilocapridae, the family that includes the modern pronghorn, developed cursorial adaptations before the existence of pursuit predators in North America, and cautioned against attributing such adaptations to a particular selective pressure without sufficient evidence. In 2017, American paleontologist David Levering and colleagues claimed that North American ungulates diversified during the late Miocene epoch, as the expansion of open grasslands favored longer limbs for faster, more energy-efficient locomotion with longer strides, rather than primarily as an adaptation to escape predation. However, their morphospace analyses (graphical representations of variation in organism's morphology) showed that Miocene antilocaprids and contemporary North American camelids and equids already possessed cursorial limb adaptations before or during these vegetation changes, possibly indicating that open grassland expansion may not have driven these adaptations, or that open habitats existed before the Miocene grassland expansion.

To identify the factors that shaped the evolution of antilocaprids, Brazilian paleontologists João C. S. Nascimento and Mathias M. Pires compared the estimated diversification and extinction rates of the antilocaprids with those of other contemporary North American fauna and flora in 2025. The authors claimed that competition among herbivores driven by the rapid increase of open grasslands in the late Miocene, from 10 to 7 million years ago, likely led to the diversification of Antilocaprinae, the subfamily of Antilocapridae. They also suggested that the felids like Miracinonyx may have influenced both the antilocaprines' cursorial adaptations and decline in diversity, based on a correlation between felid diversification and antilocaprine extinction rates.

To observe whether cursorial adaptations developed gradually or early in antilocaprid evolution, American paleontologists Fabian C. Hardy and Anne E. Kort compared the ankle bone proportions of the modern pronghorns with those of the Miocene antilocaprids in 2026, under the assumption that the relatively short ankle bones were adaptations for high speeds in artiodactyls (even-toed ungulates) like pronghorns that live in open environments. The authors concluded that no significant difference in ankle bone proportions can be found between the modern pronghorns and their early relatives of the Miocene, suggesting that the antilocaprids developed cursorial adaptations prior to the first appearance of Miracinonyx and that their limbs were already adjusted to open habitats. Based on isotopic evidence and fossils of M. trumani from the Arctic environments of Yukon, Cassatt-Johnstone and colleagues proposed that the species was not exceptionally specialized like the modern cheetah for hunting cursorial prey such as pronghorns, but had a more flexible diet comparable to those of modern lions and cougars, both of which also have broad geographic ranges.

== Distribution ==
Geographic distribution and sample localities for M. trumani

Fossils of Miracinonyx have been found as far south as Mexico, across the United States and as far north as Yukon, Canada. Remains of M. trumani are known from Arizona, California, Mexico, Nevada, New Mexico, Wyoming, and Yukon. The specimens from Arizona, California, Mexico and Yukon were initially misidentified as those of the cougar, but have since been reclassified as M. trumani, indicating that the species had a wider range in the Late Pleistocene than previously thought. Furthermore, fossils comparable to and likely representing M. trumani include a phalanx labeled cf. M. trumani found in Colorado and a partial tibia described as M.? trumani from South Carolina. Some metacarpal and metatarsal bones originally identified as M. cf. M. inexpectatus from the Late Pleistocene of Florida and Texas more likely represent M. trumani instead, since M. inexpectatus is not known from the Late Pleistocene.

Fossils of M. inexpectatus have been found in Arkansas, California, Florida, Maryland, Nebraska, Pennsylvania, South Carolina, Texas, and West Virginia. An isolated third premolar from the Pliocene-aged Hagerman Fossil Beds National Monument of Idaho was assigned to M. inexpectatus, dated between 4.2 and 3.1 million years ago. However, its specific depositional age (the exact time when the rock layers were accumulated) within this interval cannot be determined due to the lack of locality data. Specimens comparable to M. inexpectatus were known from teeth assigned to as M. cf. M. inexpectatus in Colorado, teeth and phalanges assigned to as F. cf. F. inexpectata in Georgia, and partial skull and teeth assigned to as F. cf. F. studeri in Mexico. A possible skeleton of this species has also been informally reported from southwestern Virginia.

M. inexpectatus lived between the Late Pliocene and Middle Pleistocene, with the earliest definitive record in the Cita Canyon of Texas, dated between 3.04 and 2.58 million years ago, and the youngest fossil record in the Conard Fissure of Arkansas, dated to approximately 600,000 years ago. M. trumani lived during the Late Pleistocene, with the oldest possible fossil assigned to as cf. M. trumani and radiocarbon dated to 52,200 years BP from the Mineral Hill Cave in Elko County, Nevada.^{MEGA14C} The youngest bone assigned to cf. M. trumani was discovered in the Haystack Cave of Gunnison, Colorado. Radiocarbon dating on the bone fragments of an unidentified mammal from these rock layers suggest that their depositional age is between 19,659-16,604 calibrated years BP (14,935 ± 610 uncalibrated years BP), which has been considered as the latest occurrence of M. trumani.^{Table S3}
