= North American porcupine =

North American porcupine Temporal range: Middle Pleistocene – present (~130,000–0 YBP)
- Erethizon dorsatum nigrescens Yoho National Park, BC, Canada
- The back of the same animal

Conservation status
- Least Concern (IUCN 3.1)

- Secure (NatureServe)

Scientific classification
- Kingdom: Animalia
- Phylum: Chordata
- Class: Mammalia
- Order: Rodentia
- Family: Erethizontidae
- Subfamily: Erethizontinae
- Genus: Erethizon
- Species: E. dorsatum

Binomial name
- Erethizon dorsatum (Linnaeus, 1758)

Subspecies
- Erethizon dorsatum dorsatum; Erethizon dorsatum bruneri; Erethizon dorsatum couesi; Erethizon dorsatum epixanthum; Erethizon dorsatum myops; Erethizon dorsatum nigrescens; Erethizon dorsatum picinum
- Erethizon dorsatum distribution

Synonyms
- Erethizon dorsatus (Note: ITIS claims that Erethizon dorsatus is a valid name while Erethizon dorsatum is invalid, assuming that Erethizon is a masculine Latin noun; however it is in fact a Greek participle, not a Latin noun.); Hystrix dorsata Linnaeus, 1758

Species of rodent

The North American porcupine (Erethizon dorsatum), also known as the Canadian porcupine, is a large quill-covered rodent in the New World porcupine family. It is the second largest rodent in North America after the North American beaver (Castor canadensis). The porcupine is a caviomorph rodent whose ancestors were believed to have crossed the Atlantic from Africa to Brazil 30 million years ago, and then migrated to North America during the Great American Interchange after the Isthmus of Panama rose 3 million years ago.

== Etymology ==
The word "porcupine" comes from the middle or old French word porcespin, which means 'thorn pig'. Its roots derive from the Latin words porcus or pig and spina meaning thorns. Other colloquial names for the animal include quill pig. It is also referred to as the Canadian porcupine or common porcupine. The porcupine's scientific name, Erethizon dorsatum, can be loosely translated as "the animal with the irritating back". Indigenous terms for it include the Lakota name pahin meaning quill, the Ho-Chunk name waxąhį, and the Chipewyan name tsʼl.

== Taxonomy and evolution ==
The North American porcupine migrated from South America, where all New World porcupines or hystricomorphs evolved. Erethizon appeared in North America shortly after the two continents joined together in the later Tertiary period. Other hystricomorphs also migrated, but Erethizon was the only one to survive north of Mexico. No known fossils are attributed to hystricomorphs prior to the late Tertiary period.

South American hystricomorphs first appeared in the Lower Oligocene period. They are thought to have migrated from Africa, ancestors of the Old World porcupines or Hystricidae or they originated based on a migration of the North American Paramyidae.

The earliest purported appearance of E. dorsatum in the fossil record is from the Pleistocene (Irvingtonian) era, found along the Arroyo del Cedazo near Aguascalientes, Mexico. However, the validity of this fossil's taxonomy is a cause for debate, with some paleontologists arguing that it represents a member of the genus Coendou (the prehensile-tailed porcupines) instead. The earliest uncontroversial fossils of E. dorsatum, found in the Conard Fissure of Arkansas, date back to the Middle Pleistocene (~130,000 YBP).

=== Subspecies ===
Seven subspecies of E. dorsatum are recognized. They are subdivided by different ranges across North America. By far the most common is E. d. dorsatum, which ranges from Nova Scotia to Alberta and from Virginia to the Yukon. E. d. picinum occupies a small range in northeastern Quebec and Labrador. E. d. couesi is the most southern ranging from northern Mexico to Colorado. E. d. bruneri can be found in the midwest from Arkansas to Montana. The last three are found in the west. From south to north they are E. d. epixanthum, E. d. nigrescens, and E. d. myops.

== Description ==
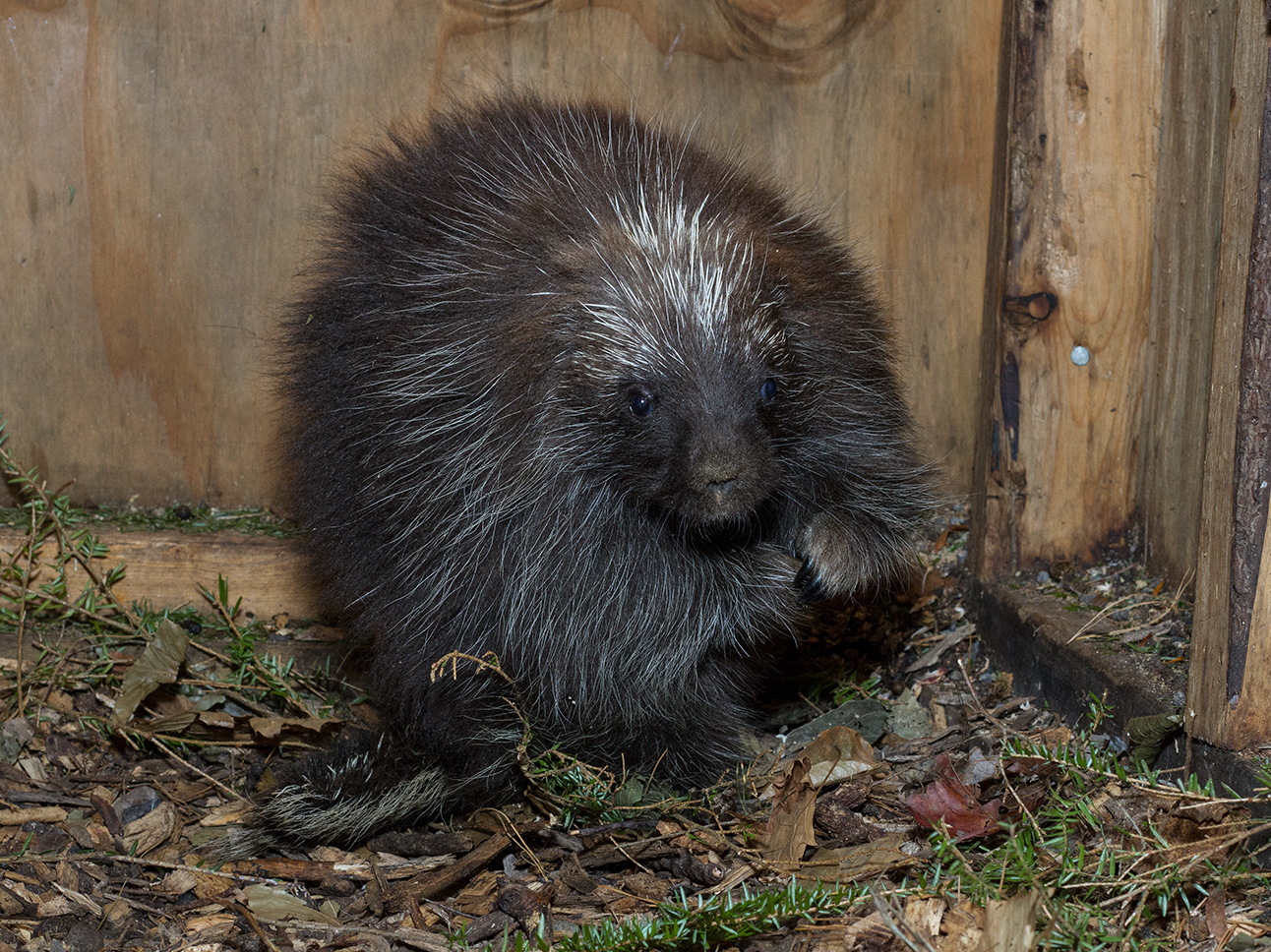
Juvenile male spends its first winters with its mother.

Mother & young crossing the road

Porcupines are usually dark brown or black in color, with white highlights. They have a stocky body, a small face, short legs, and a short, thick tail. This species is the largest of the New World porcupines and is the second largest rodent endemic to North America, after the American beaver (the Lesser capybara, which is larger, does range into North American Panama, but mostly occurs in South America). The head-and-body length is 60 to 90 cm (2.0 to 3.0 ft), not counting a tail of 14.5 to 30 cm (5.7 to 11.8 in). The hind foot length is 7.5 to 9.1 cm (3.0 to 3.6 in). Weight can range from 3.5 to 18 kg (7.7 to 39.7 lb). Weight in adult females can average some 7 kg (15 lb) while 5 wild-caught males averaged 10.67 kg (23.5 lb).

The porcupine, the wolverine, and the skunk are North American mammals that have strongly contrasting black-and-white coloration, which benefits them by letting other animals know where and what they are in the dark of night.

The coloration of E. dorsatum generally does not vary. However in the Pacific Northwest, members of the E. d. epixanthum subspecies have been found with a recognizable yellow coloration to their quills. The porcupines found with this distinct coloration did not have albinism and the eyes and nose had their typical pigmentation, they are believed to be isabelline in terms of coloration.

=== Quills ===
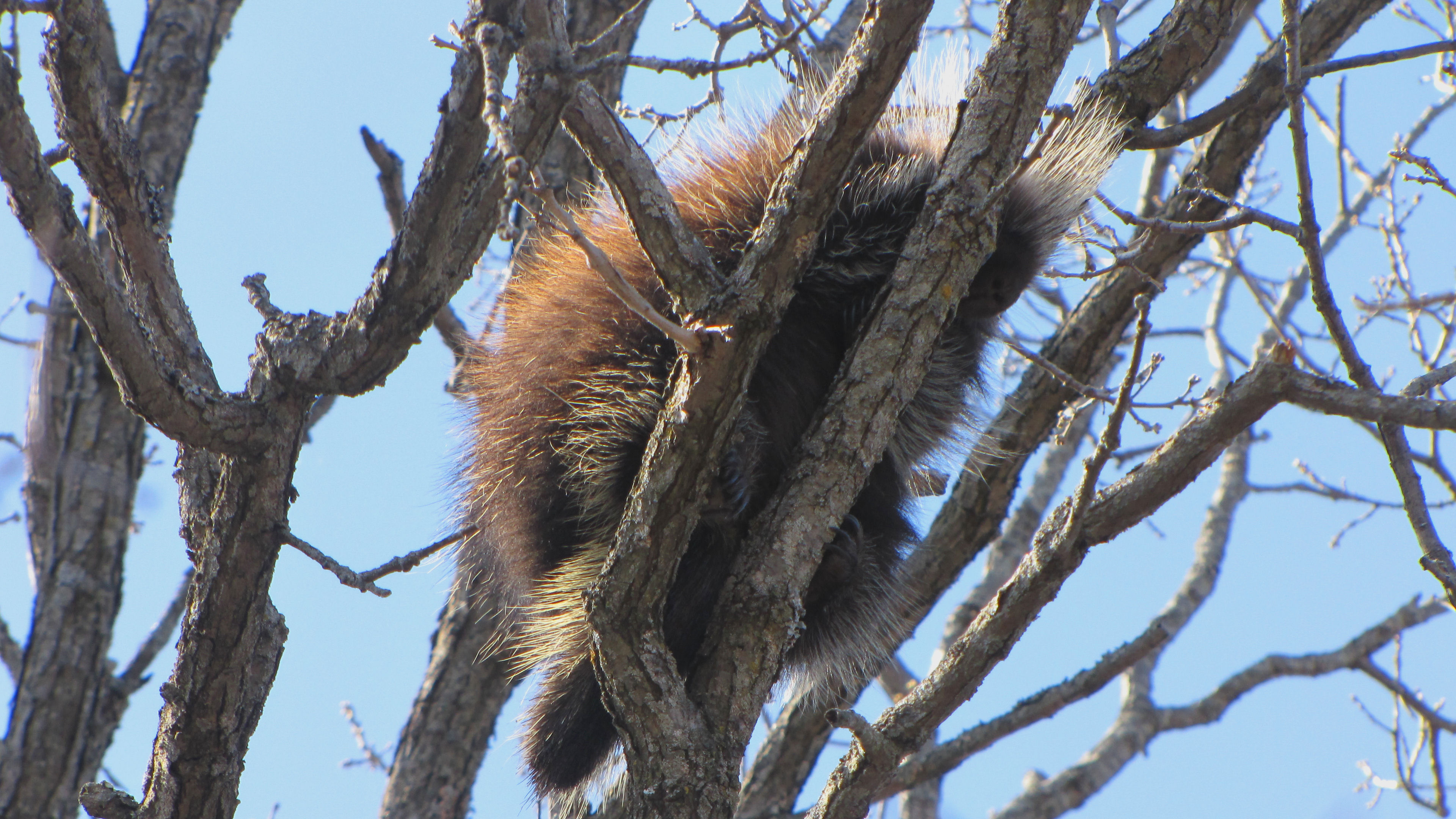
E. d. dorsatum, resting in a tree, Ottawa, Ontario

The most distinguishing feature of the porcupine is its coat of quills. An adult porcupine has about 30,000 quills that cover all of its body except its underbelly, face, and feet. Quills are modified hairs formed into sharp, barbed, hollow spines. They are used primarily for defense, but also serve to insulate their bodies during winter. The quills are normally flattened against the body and in this position are less easily dislodged. Porcupines do not throw their quills, but when threatened contract superficial muscles which cause the quills to stand up and out from their bodies. In this position they become easier to detach from the body, especially when the tail is swung toward an attacker. The barbs at the end of the spines lodge in the flesh of a victim and are difficult and painful to remove. The quills have a fatty acid coating which gives them antibiotic properties that help protect the porcupines from injuries. This helps prevent infection when a porcupine falls out of a tree and is stuck with its own quills upon hitting the ground. Porcupines fall out of trees fairly often because they are highly tempted by the succulent buds and tender twigs at the ends of the branches.

== Distribution and habitat ==
In eastern North America, porcupines range from Canada to the Appalachian Mountains in West Virginia and Maryland, though east of the Appalachians their range extends no farther south than northern New Jersey. In the west they range from Alaska to northern mountains in Mexico. They are commonly found in coniferous and mixed forested areas, but have adapted to harsh environments, such as shrublands and tundra. They make their dens in hollow trees or in rocky areas.

== Ecology ==
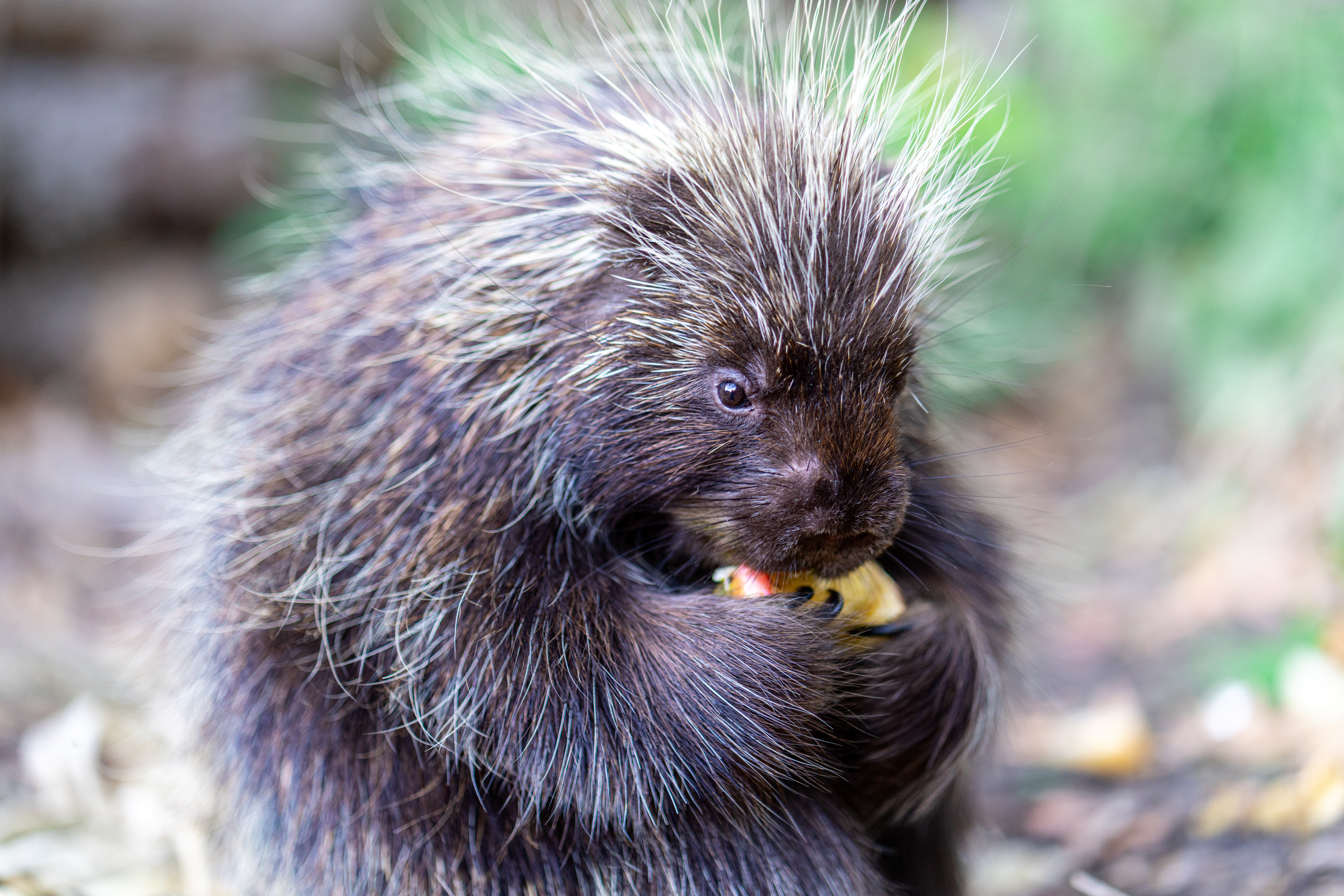
North American porcupine at Long Lake Conservation Center in Palisade, Minnesota

=== Diet ===
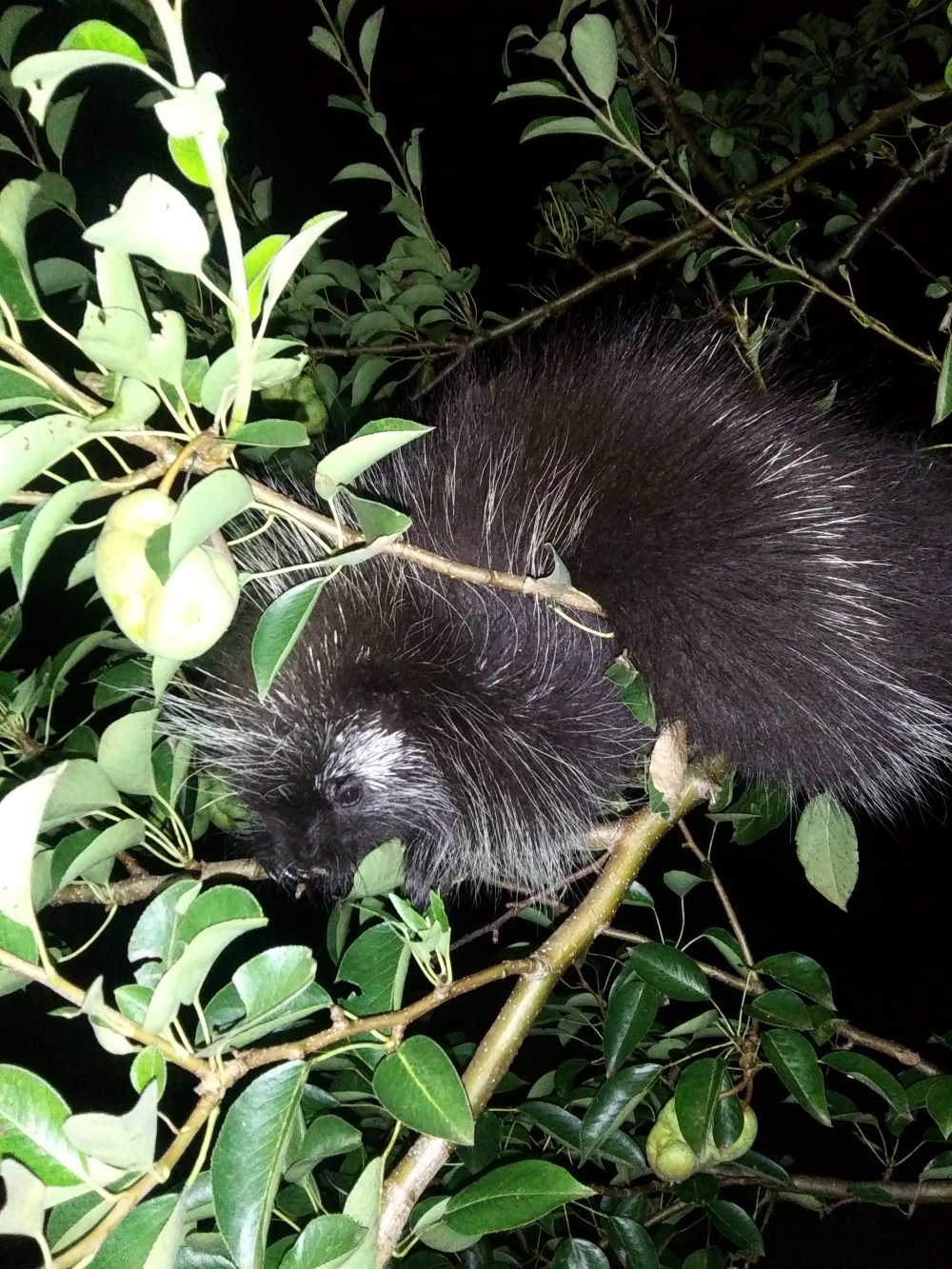
Porcupine in a pear tree

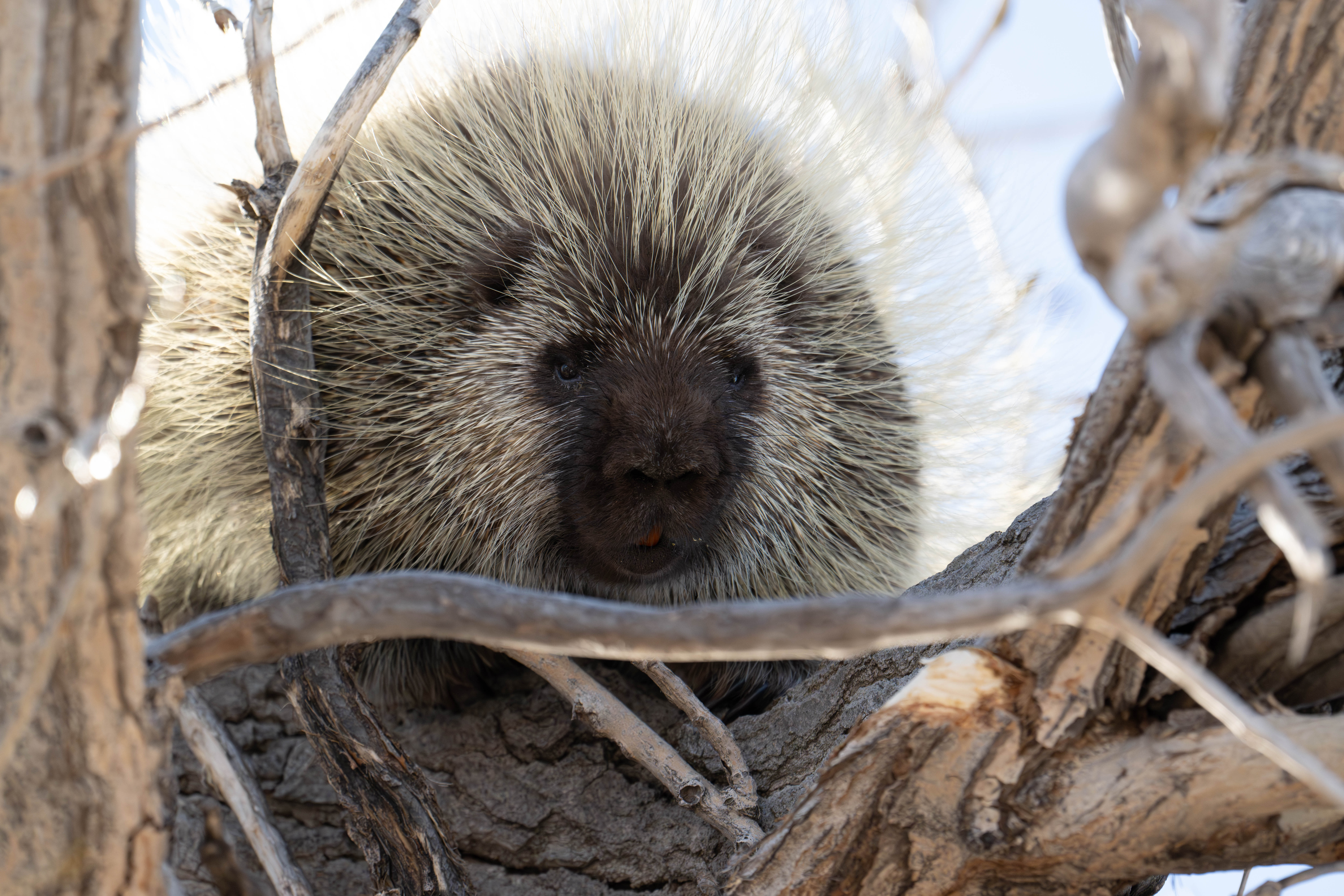
Porcupine in a cottonwood tree in Badlands National Park in South Dakota.

Porcupines are herbivores. During the summer, North American porcupines eat twigs, roots, stems, fruits, leaves, and other vegetation. In the winter, they eat mainly conifer needles and tree bark. Porcupines are selective in their consumption, but the degree of selectivity depends on the season.

=== Behavior ===
Porcupines are nearsighted and slow-moving. They are active mainly at night, as they are nocturnal. On summer days, they often rest in trees. They do not hibernate, but sleep in and stay close to their dens in winter. The strength of the porcupine's defense has given it the ability to live a solitary life, unlike many herbivores, which must move in flocks or herds. The porcupine has "an extraordinary ability to learn complex mazes and to remember them as much as a hundred days afterward".

=== Defense ===
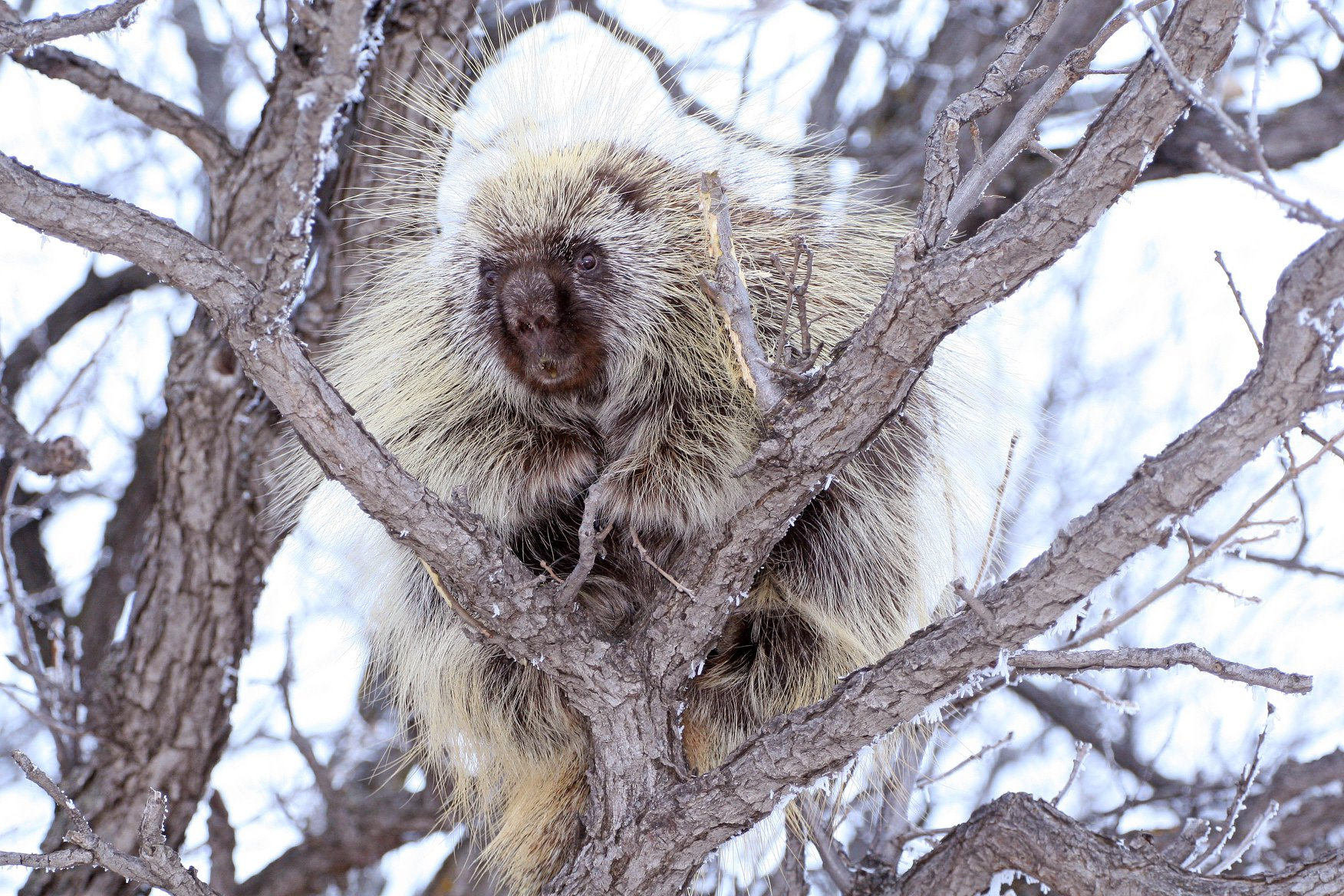
Adult North American porcupine has 30,000 quills

The North American porcupine has specific behaviors to warn or defend against predators. The defense strategy is based on aposematism in several modalities. They have a strong odor to warn away predators, which it can increase when agitated. The smell has been described as similar to strong human body odor, goats, or some cheeses. The odor is generated by a patch of skin that has completely developed sebaceous glands, called the rosette. This patch is on the lower back where modified quills serve as osmetrichia to broadcast the smell. The characteristic odor comes from the R-enantiomer of delta-decalactone. Not present is the S-enantiomer which smells like coconut and is used in flavorings and perfumes. In addition to their stench, when threatened, an adult porcupine can bristle its quills, displaying a white stripe down its back, and use its teeth to make a warning, clacking sound. If the olfactory, visual, and auditory warnings fail, then it can rely on its quills. An adult porcupine when attacked turns its rear to the predator. When approached, the porcupine can swing its tail at an attacker's face. Despite popular myth, the porcupine does not throw its quills. Instead, when a quill comes in contact with the attacker, it can easily penetrate and become embedded in its skin. Each quill contains microscopic barbs which allow it to stick into the flesh of an attacker. This strategy is successful against most attacks. With a face full of quills, an attacking creature often retreats.

=== Predators ===
Natural predators of this species include fishers (a cat-sized mustelid), wolverines, coyotes, wolves, American black bears, and cougars, as well as humans. The only known avian predators of this species are golden eagles and great horned owls. In many cases, injury or even death may occur in the predator from embedded porcupine quills even if they are successful in dispatching the porcupine.

The North American porcupine is most at risk from the fisher (Pekania pennanti), the male of which may sometimes exceed a mass of 5.5 kg (12 lb). Fishers are agile tree climbers, and may force a fleeing porcupine from a tree to the ground, where it is more vulnerable. There it will try to present its hindquarters and tail to the attacker, with the predator circling around and attempting to attack the prey. After repeated attacks, the porcupine eventually weakens, allowing the fisher to flip the porcupine over, rip open its underbelly, and consume its organs without exposing itself to the still dangerous quills. One study suggested that since male fishers are considerably larger than females (often weighing on average twice as much), only males are likely to hunt porcupines.

Another predator of the porcupine is the cougar. When attacking, the cougar does not try to avoid the quills all together, but they avoid being impaled by too many of them. Some individuals have been found with dozens of quills embedded in their gums to no ill effect. It can climb trees, so its favorite method is to position itself below the porcupine and knock it to the ground. Other predators, such as canids (wolves and coyotes), may attack but do not pose much of a threat. In some parts of the Great Basin, cougars have greatly decreased numbers of porcupines in mountainous forests through predation. In some cases, porcupine quills have indeed killed cougars, although typically the porcupine has already been consumed.

=== Reproduction ===
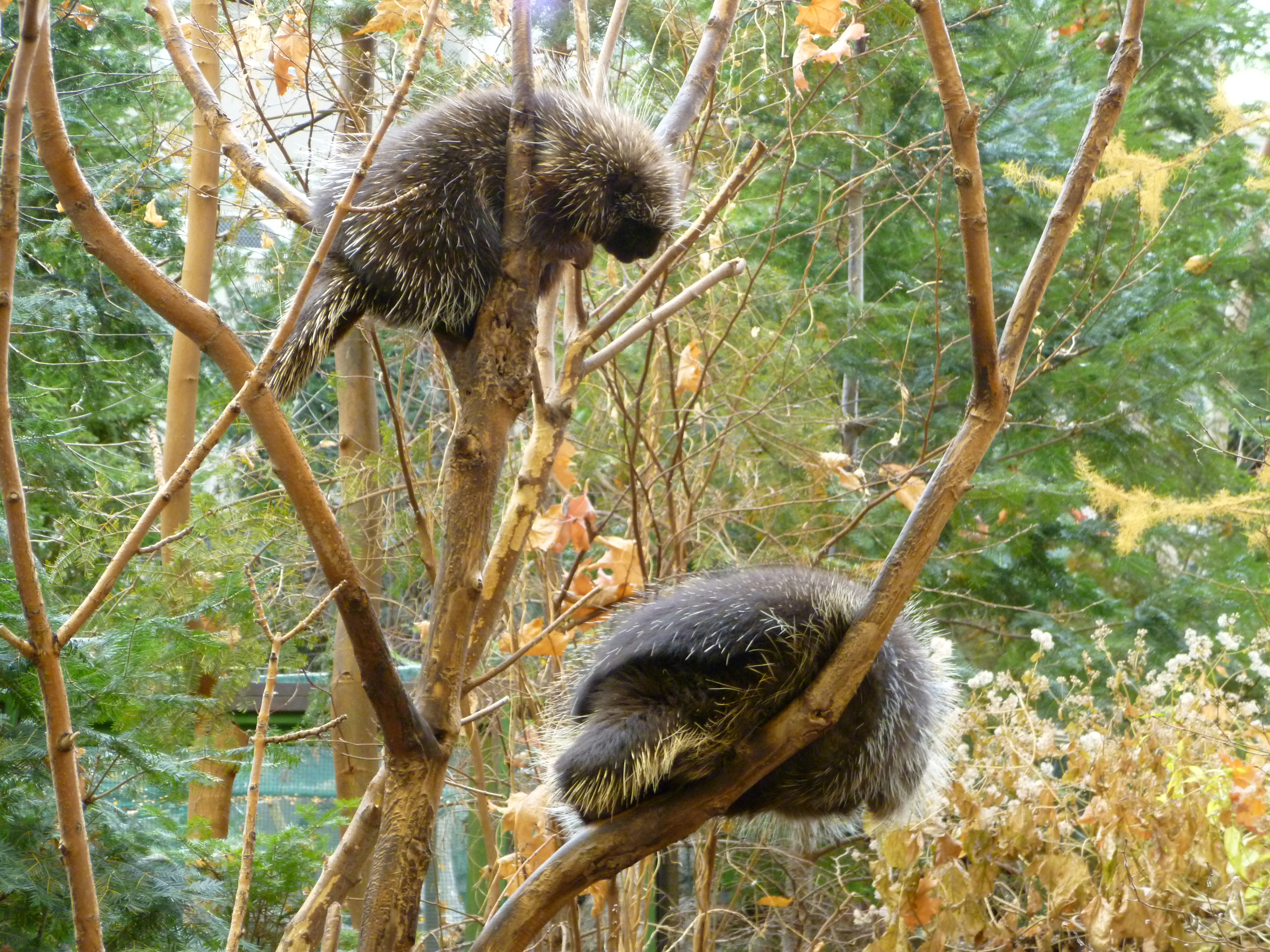
Porcupines prior to mating, with the female characteristically above the male

Female porcupines are solitary for most of the year except during the fall when breeding season begins. At this time, they secrete thick mucus that mixes with urine, producing an odor attracting nearby males. The male typically sits in a tree below the female. If another male approaches, they may fight for mating rights. Once a dominant male succeeds, he approaches and sprays urine on the female, causing her to enter estrus. They then mate on the ground, with both tightening their skin and holding quills flat to avoid injury. Mating may repeat until the female loses interest and climbs back into the tree.

The North American porcupine has a long gestation period relative to other rodents, an average of 202 days. By contrast, the North American beaver, which is comparable in size, has a gestation period of 128 days. The eastern grey squirrel (Sciurus carolinensis) has a gestation period of just 44 days. North American porcupines give birth to a single young, referred to as a porcupette. At birth, they weigh about 450 g (16 oz), which increases to nearly 1 kg (2.2 lb) after the first two weeks. They do not gain full adult weight, 4.5 kg (9.9 lb), until the end of the second summer. Their quills harden soon after birth.

Female porcupines provide all parental care. For the first two weeks the young rely on their mother for sustenance. After this they learn to climb trees and start to forage. They continue to nurse for up to four months, which coincides with the fall mating season. Porcupettes typically separate from their mother in the fall. Dispersal of immature animals is commonly done throughout the animal kingdom to avoid inbreeding, though E. dorsatum is somewhat unusual as the female porcupettes are more likely to disperse than the males.

=== Life expectancy ===
North American porcupines have a relatively long life expectancy, with some individuals reaching 30 years of age. Common causes of mortality include predation, starvation, falls from trees, and motor vehicle strikes.

== Porcupines and humans ==
Porcupines are considered by some to be pests because of the damage that they inflict on trees and wooden and leather objects. Plywood is especially vulnerable because of the salts added during manufacture. They also often injure domestic dogs who inspect or attack them.

Their quills are used by Indigenous peoples to decorate baskets and clothing. Porcupines are edible and were an important source of food, especially in winter, to the native peoples of Canada's boreal forests.

Porcupines are infamous among backpackers for their love of salt, especially eating road salt-covered boots left outside of tents overnight. They have a similar reputation among forestry workers of all types for trying to eat sweat-soaked gloves and wooden handles on tools.

=== Conservation status ===
Globally, the North American porcupine is listed as a species of least concern. It is common throughout its range except in some U.S. states in the southeast part of its range. For example, it is listed as a species in need of conservation in Maryland. As of 1999, fifteen remnant populations remain scattered throughout north-central Mexico. These live in riparian forests, mesquite scrubland, grasslands, and thorn forests. They are threatened by hunting and habitat loss. As of 1994, the animal was listed as an endangered species in Mexico.

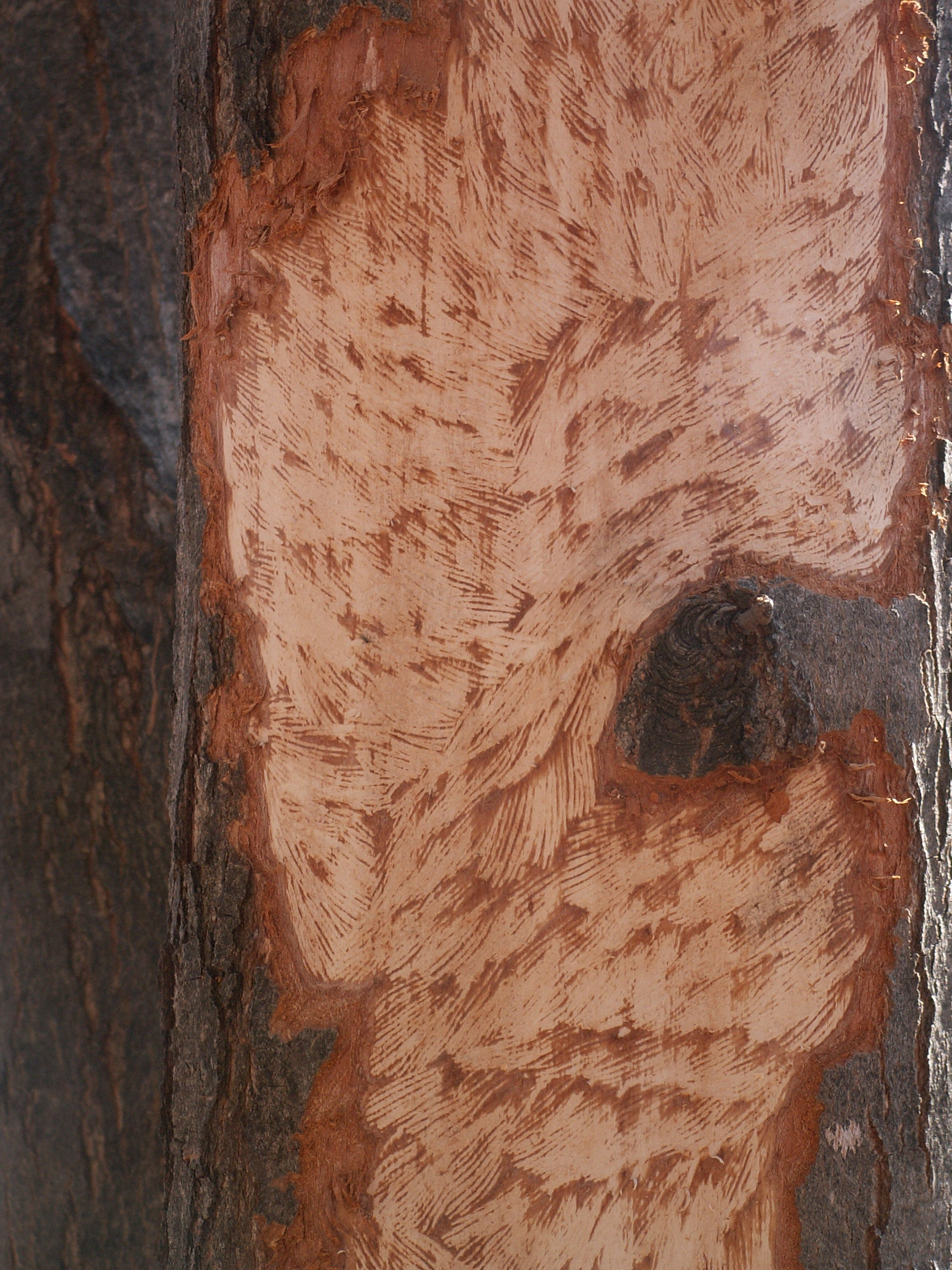
Bark of a sugar maple eaten by a porcupine in Quebec

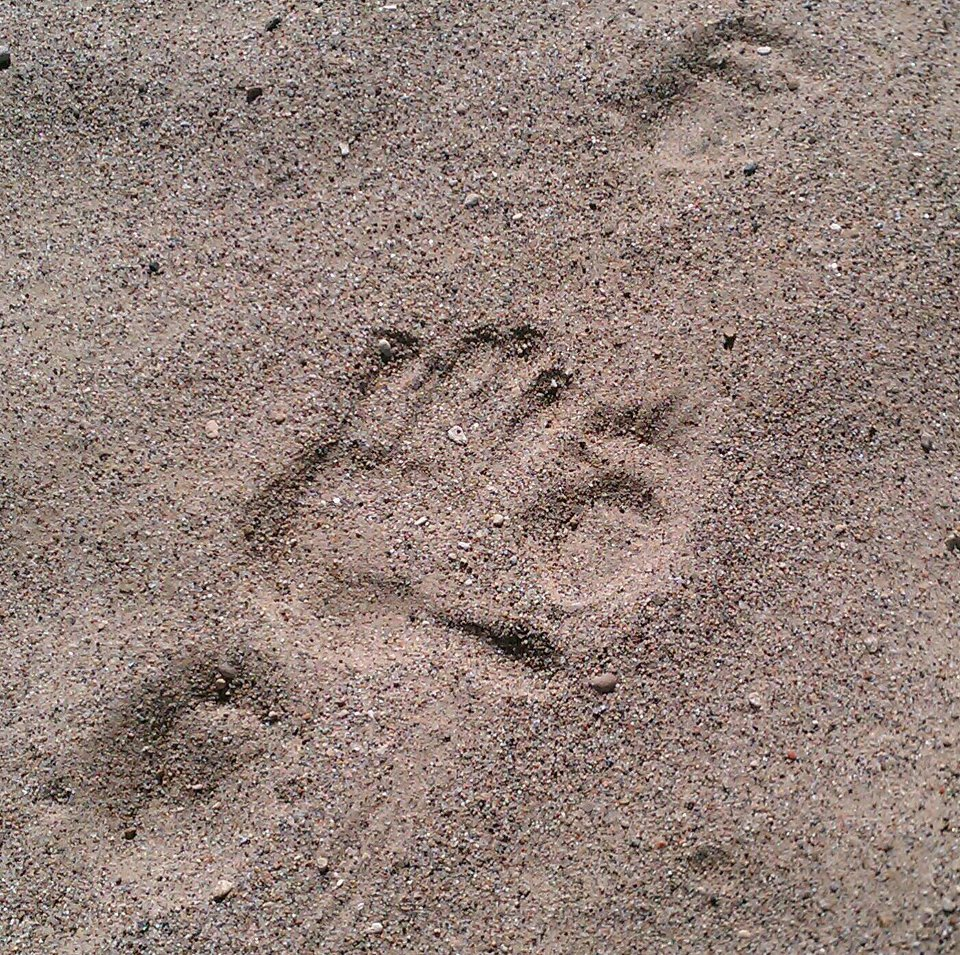
Tracks in sand (next to a human handprint shown for scale)
