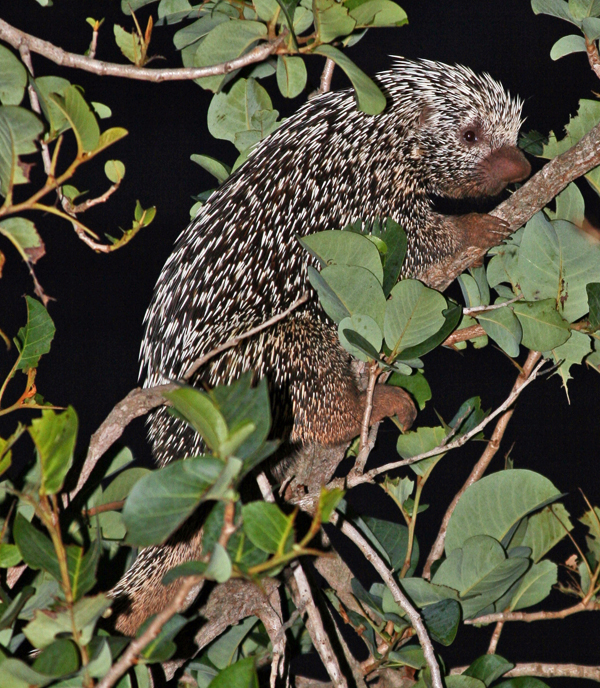
- Coendou longicaudatus in Goiás, Brazil

Conservation status
- Not evaluated (IUCN 3.1)

Scientific classification
- Kingdom: Animalia
- Phylum: Chordata
- Class: Mammalia
- Order: Rodentia
- Family: Erethizontidae
- Genus: Coendou
- Species: C. longicaudatus

Binomial name
- Coendou longicaudatus Daudin, 1802

= Amazonian long-tailed porcupine =

Species of rodent

The Amazonian long-tailed porcupine (Coendou longicaudatus), also known as Cerrado's long-tailed porcupine, is a species of rodent in the family Erethizontidae, the New World porcupines. Found across most of South America, it was first described by François Marie Daudin in 1802. It was for some time considered a subspecies of the Brazilian porcupine (Coendou prehensilis). C. prehensilis was split into three distinct species in 2021:

- the Brazilian porcupine, C. prehensilis;
- the Amazonian long-tailed porcupine, C. longicaudatus; and
- the Baturite porcupine, C. baturitensis.

The species has been recorded as exhibiting albinism and is susceptible to several fungal infections.

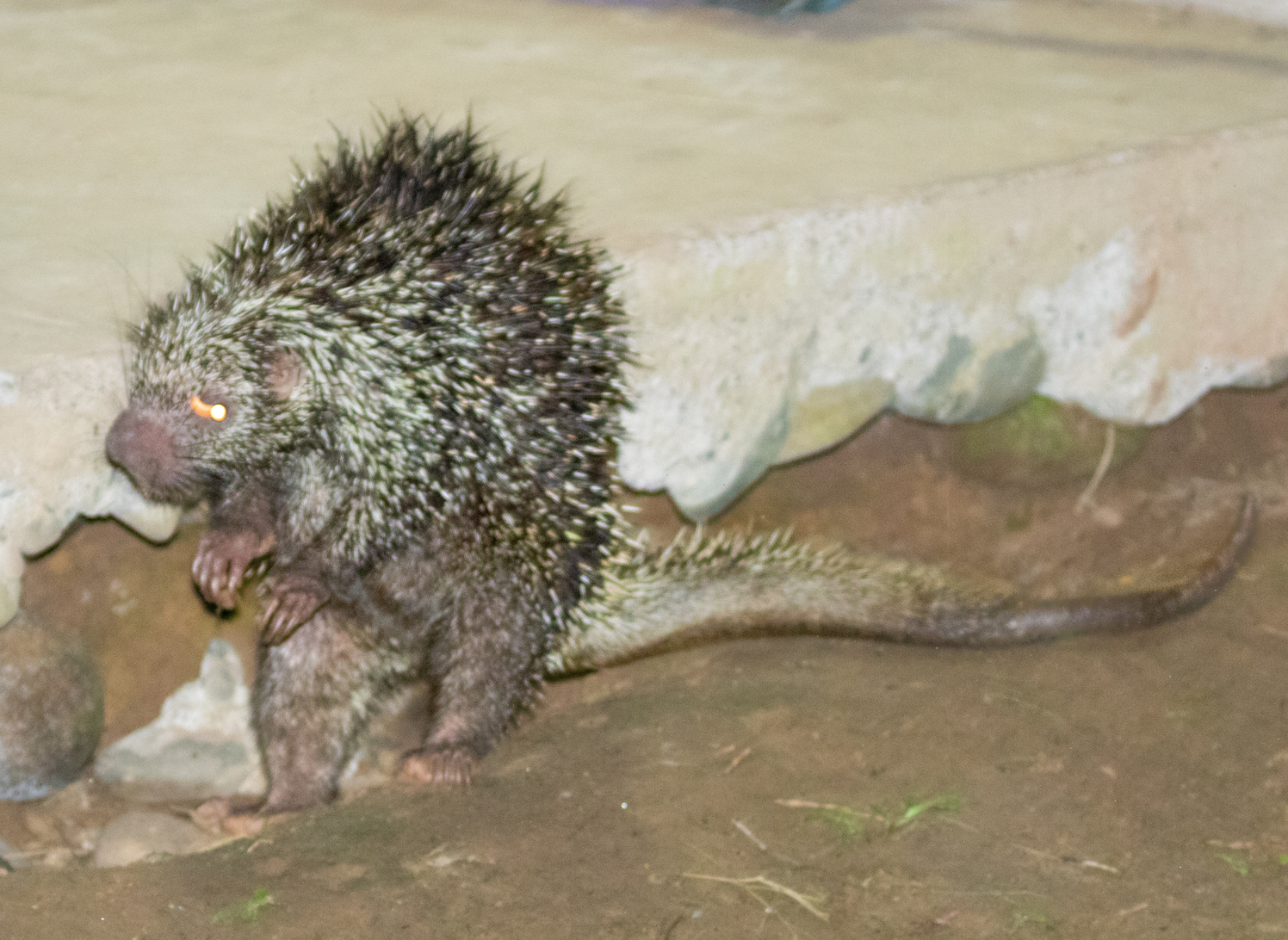
An Amazonian long-tailed porcupine seen in Yanachaga–Chemillén National Park
