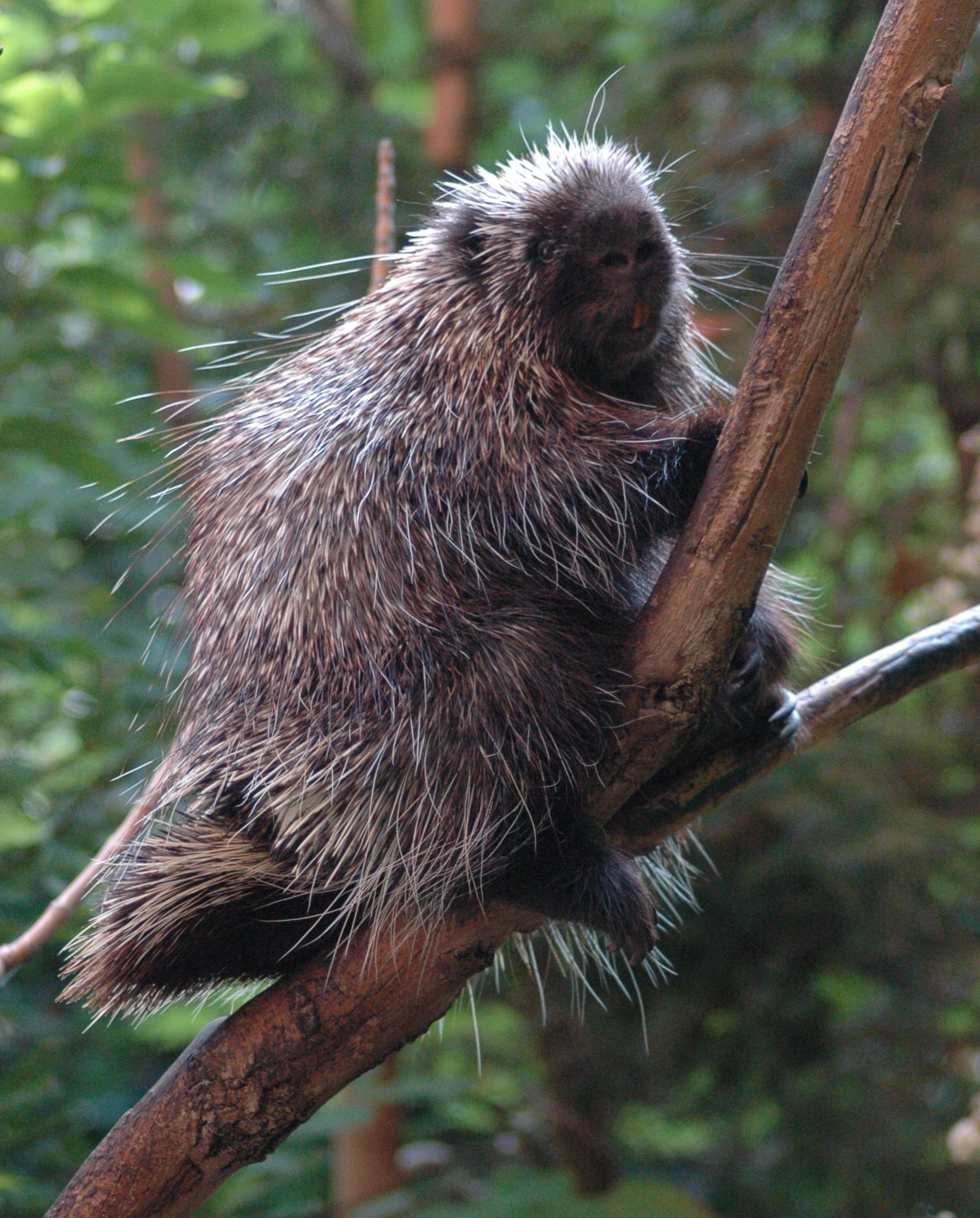
- North American porcupine (Erethizon dorsatum)

Scientific classification
- Kingdom: Animalia
- Phylum: Chordata
- Class: Mammalia
- Order: Rodentia
- Infraorder: Hystricognathi
- Parvorder: Caviomorpha
- Superfamily: Erethizontoidea
- Family: Erethizontidae; Bonaparte 1845

Type genus
- Erethizon F. Cuvier, 1823

Genera
- Chaetomys; Coendou; Erethizon; †Branisamyopsis Candela, 2003; †Cholamys Pérez et al., 2018; †Enviramys Fontoura in Fontoura et al.,2026; †Eopululo Frailey & Campbell Jr, 2004; †Hypsosteiromys Patterson, 1958; †Matsigenkamys Arnal et al., 2026; †Micronoamys Fontoura in Fontoura et al., 2026; †Microsteiromys Walton, 1990; †Neosteiromys Rovereto, 1914; †Palaeosteiromys Boivin et al., 2017; †Paradoxomys Ameghino 1885; †Parasteiromys Ameghino, 1904; †Protosteiromys Wood & Patterson, 1959
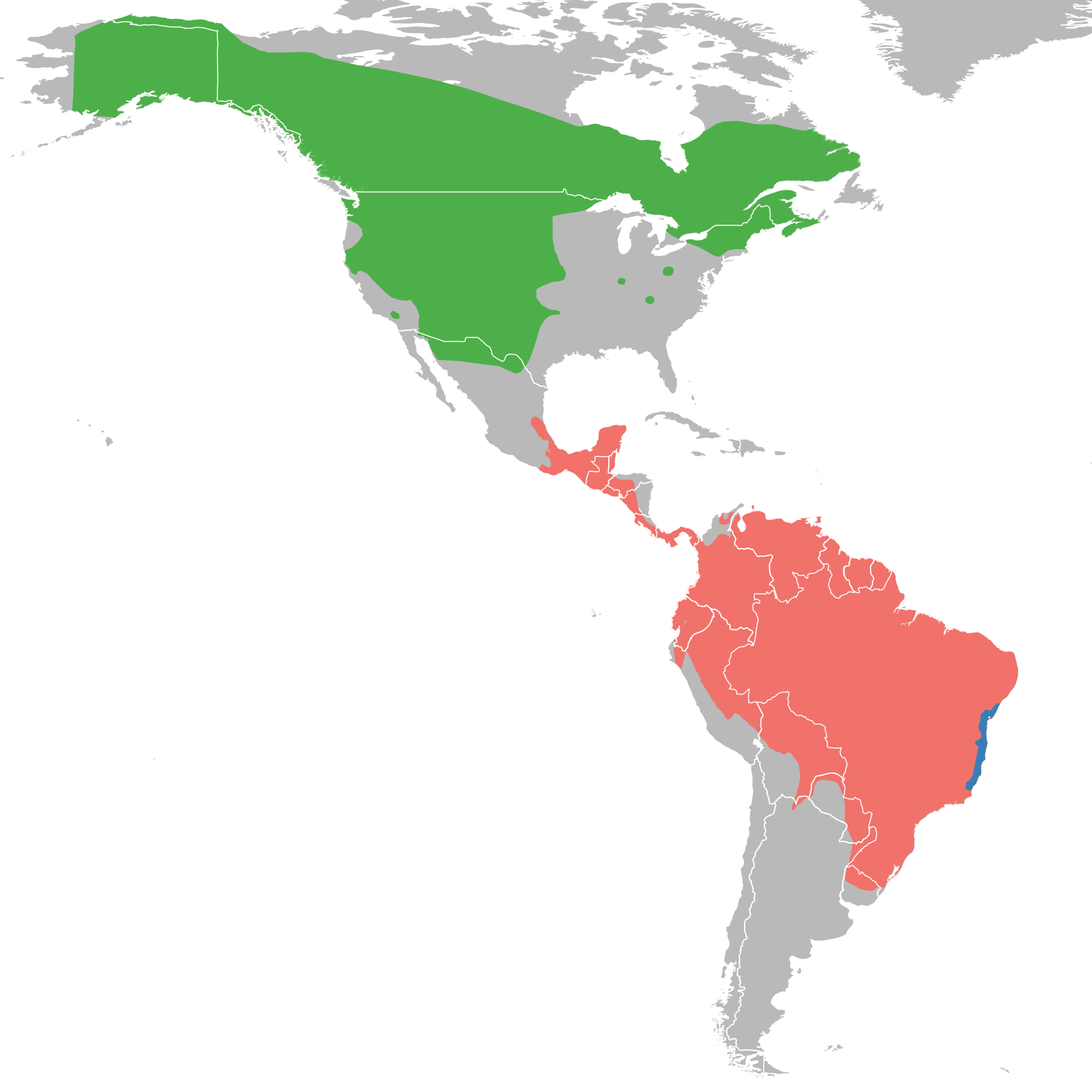
- Erethizontidae distribution. Coendou in red, Erethizon in green, Chaetomys in blue (overlaps Coendou range).

= New World porcupine =

New World porcupines Temporal range: Oligocene-Recent ~37.2–0 Ma

Family of rodents

The New World porcupines, family Erethizontidae, are large, arboreal rodents, distinguished by their spiny coverings from which they take their name. They inhabit forests and wooded regions across North America and into northern South America. Although both the New World and Old World porcupine families belong to the Hystricognathi branch of the vast order Rodentia, they are quite different and are not particularly closely related.

== Characteristics ==
New World porcupines are stout animals, with blunt, rounded heads, fleshy, mobile snouts, and coats of thick, cylindrical, or flattened spines. The "quills" are mixed with long, soft hairs. They vary in size from the relatively small prehensile-tailed porcupines, which are around 30 cm (12 in) long, and weigh about 900 g (32 oz), to the much larger North American porcupine, which has a body length of 86 cm (34 in), and weighs up to 18 kg (40 lb).

They are distinguished from the Old World porcupines in that they have rooted molars, complete collar bones, entire upper lips, tuberculated soles, no trace of first front toes, and four teats.

They are less strictly nocturnal than Old World species in their habits, and some types live entirely in trees, while others have dens on the ground. Their long and powerful prehensile tails help them balance when they are in the tree tops. Their diets consist mainly of bark, leaves, and conifer needles, but can also include roots, stems, berries, fruits, seeds, nuts, grasses, and flowers. Some species also eat insects and small reptiles. Their teeth are similar to those of Old World porcupines, with the dental formula 1.0.1.31.0.1.3.

Solitary offspring (or, rarely, twins) are born after a gestation period up to 210 days, depending on the species. The young are born fully developed, with open eyes, and are able to climb trees within a few days of birth.

== Genera and species ==
They include three genera, of which the first is represented by the North American porcupine (Erethizon dorsatum), a stout, heavily built animal, with long hairs almost or quite hiding its spines, four front and five hind toes, and a short, stumpy tail. It is a native of the greater part of Canada and the United States, where any remnant of the original forest is left.

The tree porcupines (Coendou) contain 17 species. They are found throughout tropical South America, with two extending into Mexico. They are of a lighter build than the ground porcupines, with short, close, multicoloured spines, often mixed with hairs, and prehensile tails. The hind feet have only four toes, owing to the suppression of the first, in place of which they have a fleshy pad on the inner side of the foot; between this pad and the toes, branches and other objects can be firmly grasped as with a hand.

Genus Chaetomys, distinguished by the shape of its skull and the greater complexity of its teeth, contains the bristle-spined rat (C. subspinosus), a native of the hottest parts of Brazil. This animal is often considered a member of the Echimyidae on the basis of its premolars. However, a molecular phylogeny based on the mitochondrial gene coding for cytochrome b combined to karyological evidence actually suggests the bristle-spined rat is more closely related to the Erethizontidae than to the Echimyidae, and is the sister group of all other Erethizontidae.

== Classification ==
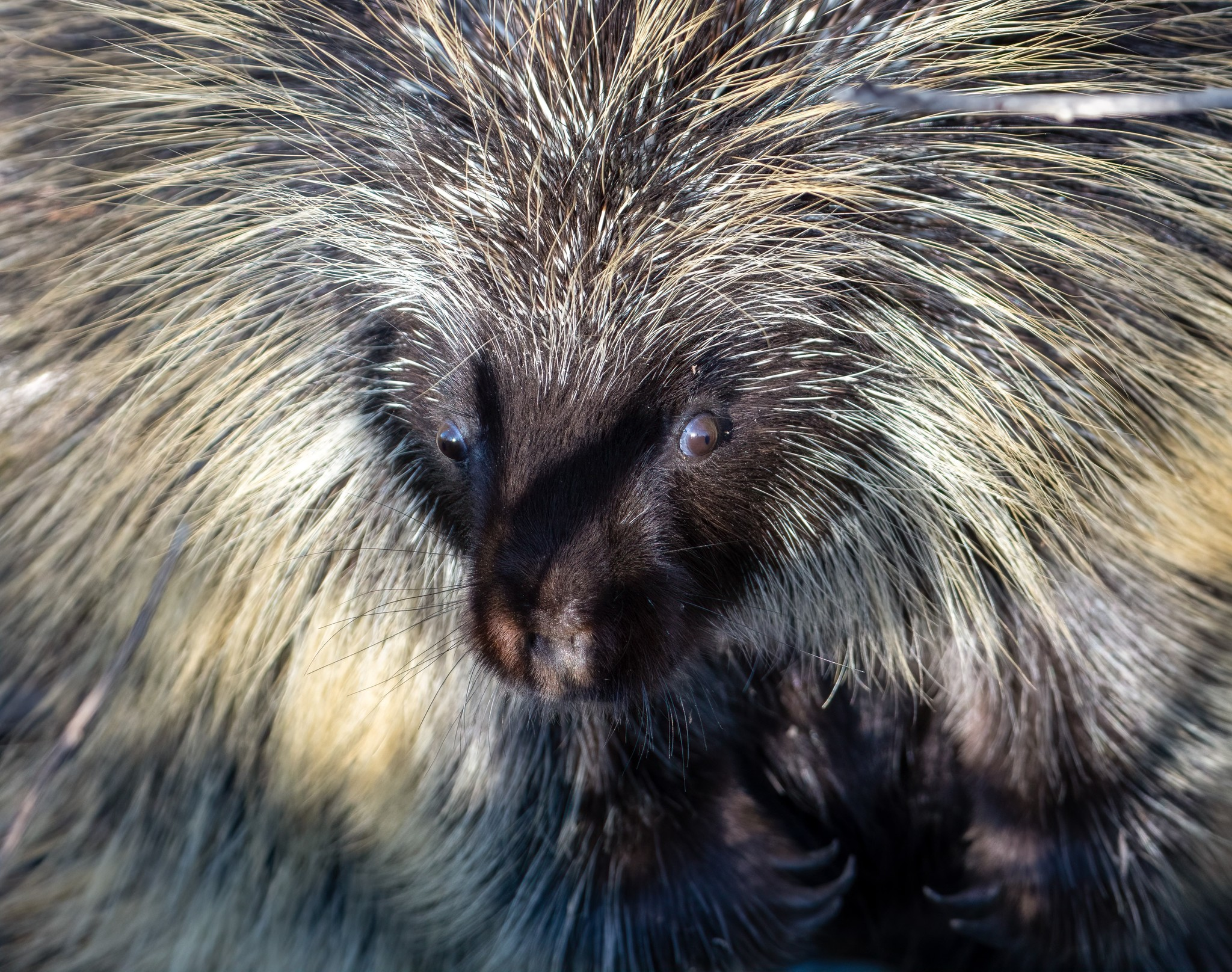
Up close view of head and front claws, Kenai National Wildlife Refuge, Alaska

Extant genera and species

- Family Erethizontidae
  - Subfamily Chaetomyinae
    - Genus Chaetomys
      - Bristle-spined rat – C. subspinosus
  - Subfamily Erethizontinae
    - Genus Coendou – prehensile-tailed porcupines
      - Baturite porcupine – C. baturitensis – discovered in 2013
      - Bicolored-spined porcupine – C. bicolor
      - Streaked dwarf porcupine – C. ichillus
      - Bahia porcupine – C. insidiosus
      - Black-tailed hairy dwarf porcupine – C. melanurus
      - Mexican hairy dwarf porcupine – C. mexicanus
      - Amazonian long-tailed porcupine – C. longicaudatus – split from C. prehensilis in 2021
      - Black dwarf porcupine – C. nycthemera
      - Brazilian porcupine – C. prehensilis
      - Frosted hairy dwarf porcupine – C. pruinosus
      - Andean porcupine – C. quichua
      - Rothschild's porcupine – C. rothschildi
      - Roosmalen's dwarf porcupine – C. roosmalenorum
      - Stump-tailed porcupine – C. rufescens
      - Santa Marta porcupine – C. sanctamartae
      - Coandumirim – C. speratus – discovered in 2013
      - Paraguaian hairy dwarf porcupine – C. spinosus
      - Brown hairy dwarf porcupine – C. vestitus
    - Genus Erethizon
      - North American porcupine – E. dorsatum

Fossil genera

- †Branisamyopsis Candela, 2003
- †Cholamys Pérez et al., 2019
- †Enviramys Fontoura in Fontoura et al., 2026
- †Eopululo Frailey & Campbell Jr 2004
- †Hypsosteiromys Patterson 1958
- †Lapazomys Pérez et al., 2018
- †Matsigenkamys Arnal et al., 2026
- †Micronoamys Fontoura in Fontoura et al., 2026
- †Microsteiromys Walton, 1990
- †Neosteiromys Candela, 2007
- †Palaeosteiromys Boivin et al., 2017
- †Parasteiromys Ameghino, 1904
- †Protosteiromys Wood & Patterson, 1959
