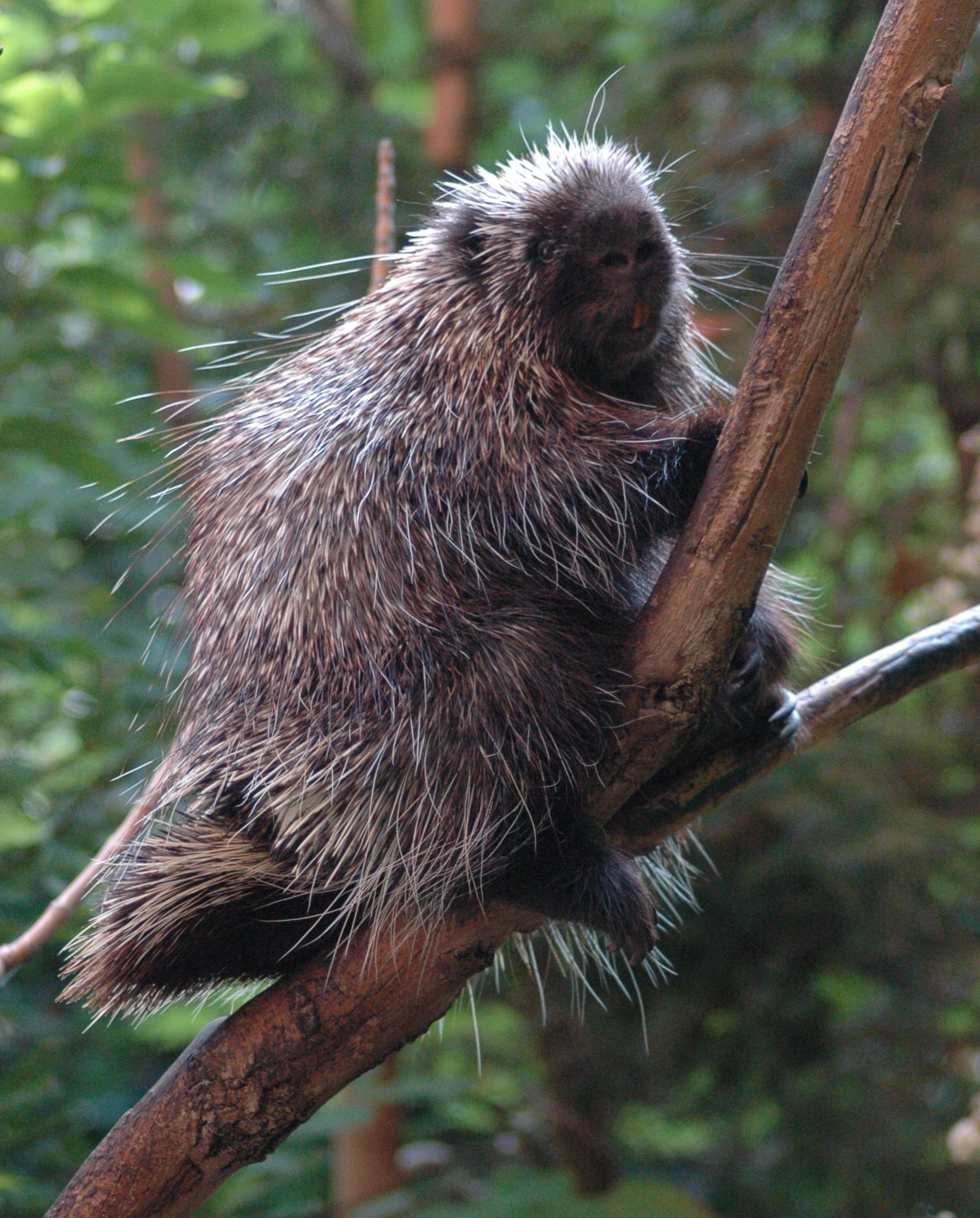
- North American porcupine (Erethizon dorsatum)

Scientific classification
- Kingdom: Animalia
- Phylum: Chordata
- Class: Mammalia
- Order: Rodentia
- Family: Erethizontidae
- Subfamily: Erethizontinae
- Genus: Erethizon; F. Cuvier, 1823

Type species
- Erithrix dorsata Linnaeus, 1758

Species
- Erethizon dorsatum; †Erethizon bathygnathum; †Erethizon cascoensis; †Erethizon kleini; †Erethizon poyeri
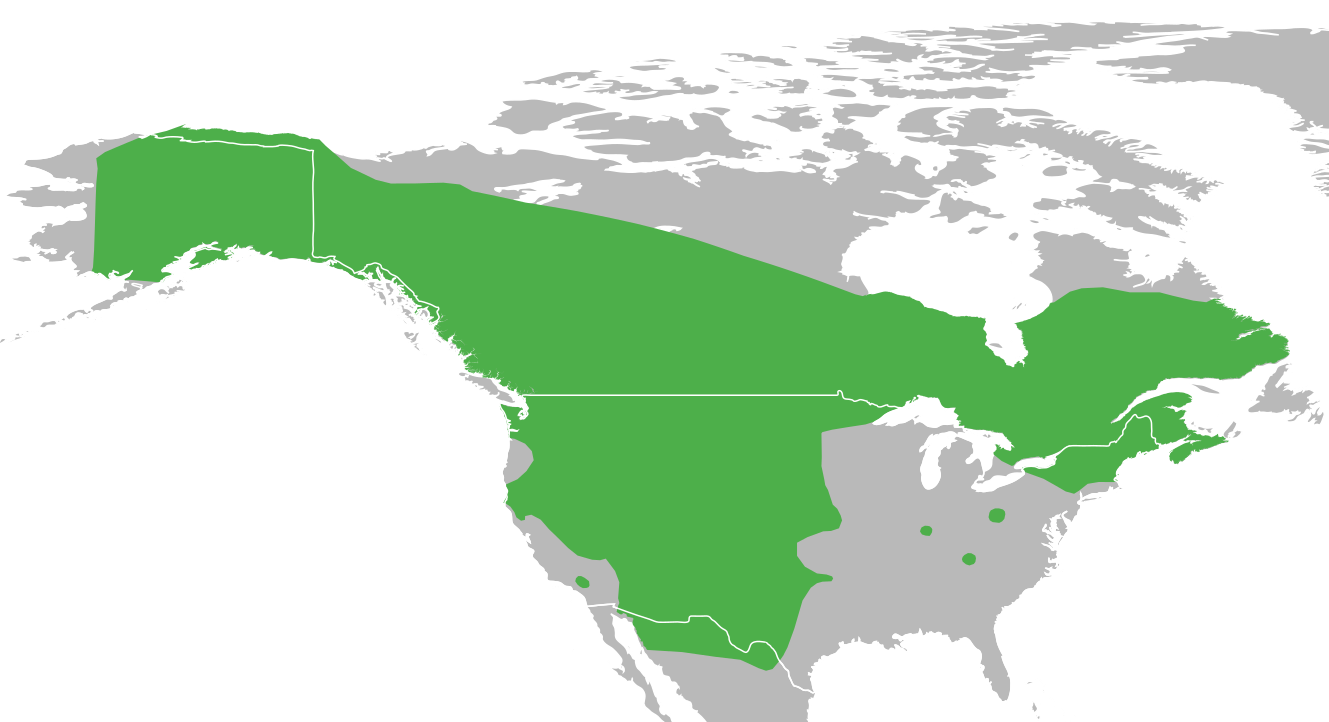
- Erethizon distribution

= Erethizon =

Erethizon Temporal range: Late Pliocene - Recent

Genus of rodent

Erethizon is a genus of New World porcupine and the only one of its family to be found north of southern Mexico. The North American porcupine (Erethizon dorsatum) is the only extant species, but at least four extinct relatives are known, the oldest dating to the Late Pliocene. Porcupines entered North America during the Great American Interchange after the Isthmus of Panama rose 3 million years ago. Early species of the genus retained an elongate tail, unlike E. dorsatum.
