= Matsigenkamys =

Matsigenkamys Temporal range: Burdigalian

Scientific classification
- Kingdom: Animalia
- Phylum: Chordata
- Class: Mammalia
- Order: Rodentia
- Family: Erethizontidae
- Genus: †Matsigenkamys; Arnal et al., 2026
- Species: †M. ericius

Binomial name
- †Matsigenkamys ericius Arnal et al., 2026

Extinct genus of erethizontid rodent

Matsigenkamys is an extinct monotypic genus of erethizontid rodent that lived in South America during the Burdigalian stage of the Early Miocene subepoch.

== Etymology ==
The generic name Matsigenkamys references the Machiguenga people, who live along the Madre de Dios River in Peru. The specific epithet of the type species, Matsigenkamys ericius, means "porcupine" in Latin. The full binomial name means "Machiguenga porcupine".
