= Natural Trap Cave =

Cave in Wyoming, United States

Coordinates: 44°58′24″N 108°11′35″W

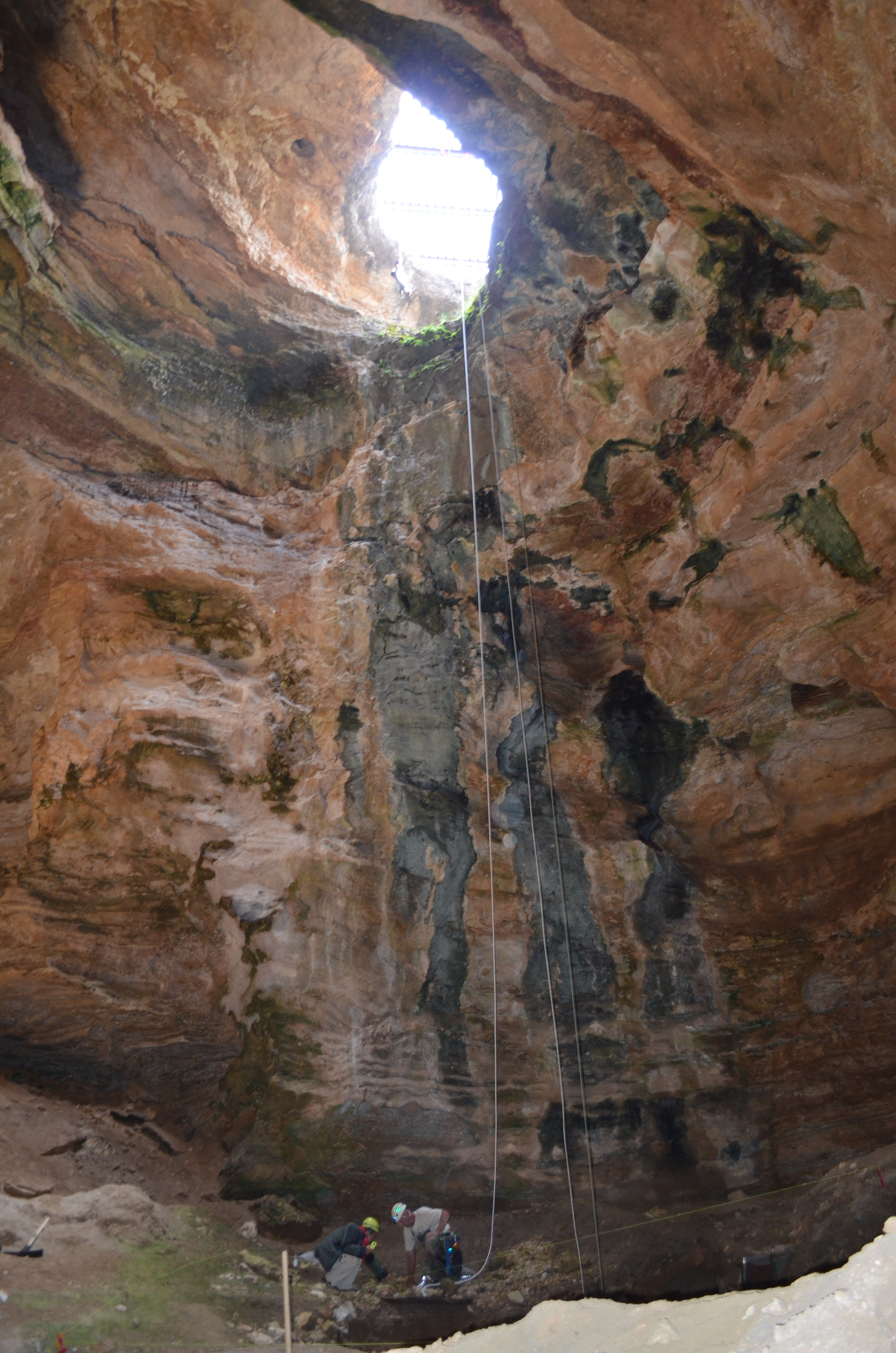
- View inside the cave
- Location: Bighorn Mountains
- Depth: 85 feet (26 m)
- Elevation: 4,560 feet (1,390 m)

Natural Trap Cave is a pit cave in the Bighorn Mountains, in northern Wyoming, United States. Excavations in the cave are an important source of paleontological information on the North American Late Pleistocene, due to a rich layer of fossils from animals that became trapped in the cave.

== Location ==
The cave is located northeast of Lovell, Wyoming, at an elevation of 4,560 feet (1,390 m). It is a bell-shaped pit or sinkhole within the Madison Limestone, 85 feet (26 m) deep, with an opening 12 by 15 feet (3.7 m × 4.6 m) at the top, and a diameter of around 120 feet (37 m) at the bottom.

== Early explorations ==
The first investigation of its animal remains was initiated in 1970 by Lawrence Loendorf of the University of Missouri, who initially collected some fossils, and began an excavation in 1971. Besides bones, one Native American red jasper knife was found below the entrance drop, and a wooden artifact, possibly an atlatl shaft, was discovered in a rat's nest below some talus. In 1972, Carol Jo Rushin of the University of Montana with a grant from the National Speleological Society and a four-person team and logistical support provided by Dr. Loendorf, excavated a 10-by-10-foot-wide (3.0 m × 3.0 m) pit at the bottom of the entrance drop, southwest of the pit excavated in 1971. The pit was dug to a depth of 6 feet (1.8 m). Late Pleistocene to recent bones from 20 species of mammals and five bird species were recovered, including a dire wolf, ancient horse, and mammoth. Rushin's Master's thesis addressed the interpretive, anthropologic, paleontologic, and geologic aspects of the cave. A short article regarding this research also appeared in the December 1972 issue of the National Speleological Society News. Further excavations were conducted throughout the 1970s by the University of Missouri and the University of Kansas.

Remains of animals which have fallen into the sinkhole since the last ice age lie over 10 metres (33 ft) deep at the bottom of the pit.

Small mammals whose remains have been found in the cave include pikas, jackrabbits, cottontail rabbits, marmots, chipmunks, Peromyscus mice, woodrats, Microtus voles, and collared lemmings. Larger mammals represented in the cave include Canis species, red foxes, short-faced bears, weasels, martens, wolverines, American cheetahs, American lions, Equus species, Camelops, deer, antilocaprids, bison, bighorn sheep, and mammoths. Remains of the American cheetah are particularly abundant in the cave.

== 2014 explorations ==
The entrance to the pit was covered with a safety grille by the Bureau of Land Management for almost thirty years.

In July–August 2014, a team of scientists of Des Moines University, led by Julie Meachen, a paleontologist specializing in Pleistocene megafauna, explored the hole over a period of two weeks. This was the first of three annual digs planned from 2014 to 2016.

The team excavated 200 large bones of large animals which included American cheetah, bison, horses, and gray wolf, as well as innumerable microfossils of birds and reptiles.

The cave remains at temperatures below 10 °C (50 °F) and has 98% humidity, which is conducive for the preservation of viable genetic material for analysis. The team has extracted samples which will be analysed by the Australian Centre for Ancient DNA at the University of Adelaide for fragments of mitochondrial DNA.

Scientists expect to find information pertaining to causes of the Quaternary extinction event, such as climate change and the advent of prehistoric man around 17,000 years ago. New insights are being sought as regards the ecology, diet, and genetic diversity of megafauna that became extinct more than 10,000 years ago.

During the excavation, a pack rat fell into the pit and died. Affectionately termed as the expedition mascot "Packy Le Pew", the pack rat has become an experiment in taphonomy, in that its body has been allowed to lie undisturbed so as to study natural patterns and rates of decay.
