= Samuel Gibson Dixon =

American lawyer, bacteriologist, and sanitarian

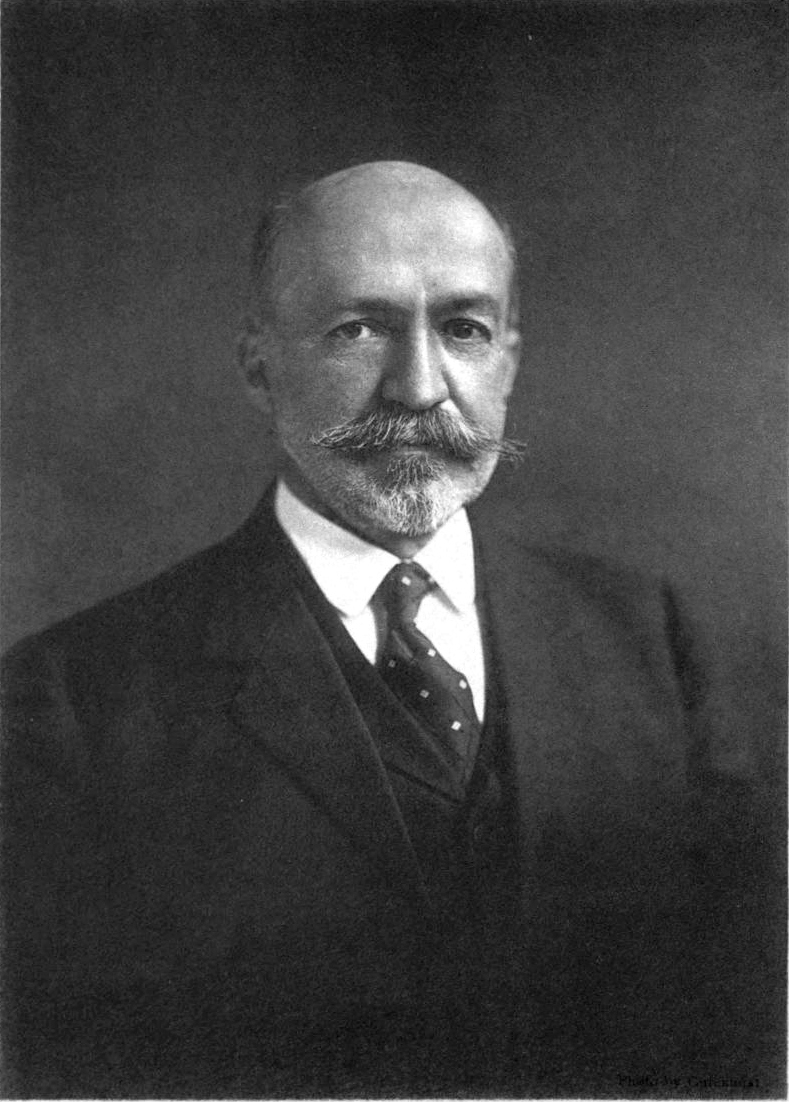
- Born: March 23, 1851; Philadelphia, Pennsylvania
- Died: February 26, 1918 (aged 66)
- Occupations: lawyer, physician, bacteriologist, sanitarian

Samuel Gibson Dixon (March 23, 1851 - February 26, 1918) was an American lawyer, physician, sanitarian for the state of Pennsylvania and bacteriologist who made important contributions to the treatment and prevention of tuberculosis in the late 19th century and early 20th century. He was the Commissioner of the State Department of Health in Pennsylvania from 1905 until his death., during which time he introduced sanitary and hygienic reforms that set new standards for government public health programs and saved thousands of lives.

Dixon was born in Philadelphia, attended private schooling, and went on to graduate from the University of Pennsylvania Law School, being admitted to the bar in 1877. He practiced for 6 years as a lawyer. Due to recurring illness, he chose to change profession and attended the medical department of the University of Pennsylvania, earning the Doctor of Medicine degree in 1886. He then studied in the department of bacteriology in King's College London, the State College of Medicine in London, and in Pettenkoffer's Laboratory of Hygiene in Munich before returning to Penn as the professor of hygiene. He attended medical school at both King's College London and Pettenkofer's Laboratory of Hygiene in Munich.

His work in tuberculosis prevention is what brought him the most recognition. He is now regarded as the first researcher to induce immune response to tuberculosis in guinea pigs—a precursor to the development of an effective treatment for the infection in humans. A tuberculosis facility in Mont Alto, Pennsylvania being named after him.

He was appointed to the Board of Public Education in Philadelphia and eventually as the commissioner of health of the State of Pennsylvania. He was elected to the American Philosophical Society in 1892.
