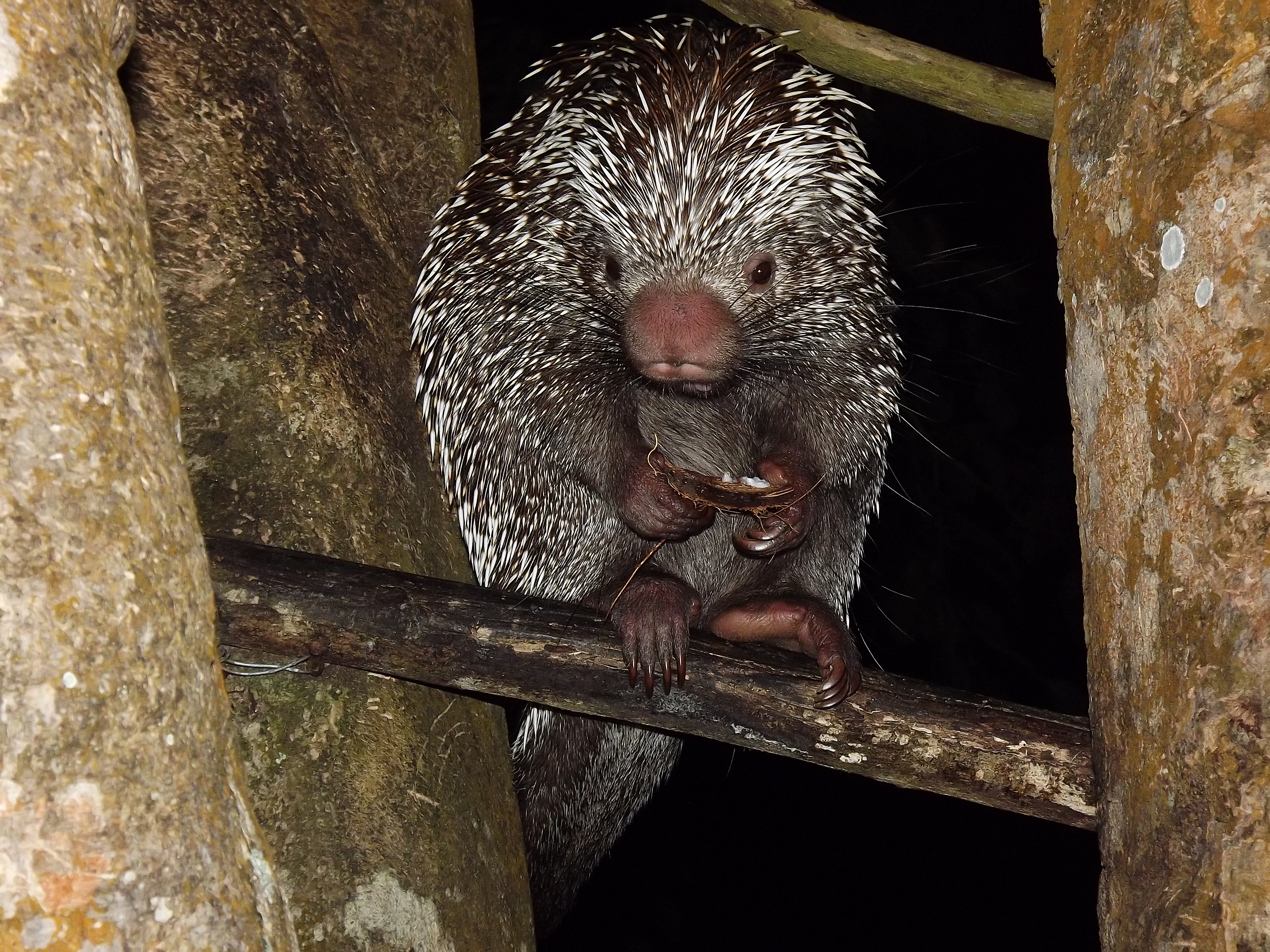

Scientific classification
- Domain: Eukaryota
- Kingdom: Animalia
- Phylum: Chordata
- Class: Mammalia
- Order: Rodentia
- Family: Erethizontidae
- Genus: Coendou
- Species: C. baturitensis

Binomial name
- Coendou baturitensis Feijó & Langguth, 2013

= Baturite porcupine =

Species of rodent

The Baturite porcupine (Coendou baturitensis) is a nocturnal species of rodent in the family Erethizontidae that is found in Brazil. The name refers to the locality of origin, a forests on a mountain range similar to the Brejos de Altitude of the Brazilian Northeast where a fauna different from that of the surrounding semiarid Caatinga can be found.
