= Conard Fissure =

Geologic feature

The Conard Fissure is a geologic feature in Northern Arkansas where a deposit of Pleistocene fossils was discovered in 1903. Several specimens from saber-toothed cats were found there among other species.

== Location ==
The fissure is located near the Buffalo National River in Newton County, Arkansas, approximately 15 miles south of the town of Harrison. It lies approximately one mile north of the river near the border of Newton and Boone County. The fissure is named after Waldo Conard who owned the land that the fissure is situated on.

== Discovery ==
The original excavation of the Conard Fissure was performed by Barnum Brown who is best known for his discovery of Tyrannosaurus rex. Waldo Conard searched several fissures and crevices on his land in 1903 trying to locate a lead mine that was rumored there. When in April he found bones instead of lead, he forwarded some of the specimens to the American Museum of Natural History (AMNH). As was common at the time, AMNH sent Barnum Brown to Arkansas to excavate the discovery. The cache of fossils at the Conard Fissure was a breathtaking scientific discovery in its own right, yet Barnum Brown was fresh off his field work in Hell Creek, Montana just the year prior. Therefore, the Conard Fissure excavation was somewhat overshadowed by the enormity of the Tyrannosaurus discovery and not published until 1908.

== The Fossils ==
On his first trip to Arkansas in 1903 Barnum Brown retrieved some three hundred jaws and many disassociated limb bones and vertebrae. He returned the following year for an even bigger yield including thousands of jaws, skulls limbs and vertebrae. All specimens were transported back to the AMNH where they were cleaned and cataloged. The majority of the specimens were partial remains of small mammals and rodents such as shrews, moles, bats, weasels, and raccoons. There were also medium predator mammals such as wolves and foxes and a large representation of peccary of the genus Mylohyus. Peccary were apparently abundant in pleistocene Arkansas and found in other caves within the Ozark Mountains as well. Large mammals were represented as well including the black bear, Ursus americanus. Most notable among those specimens collected were 15 different specimens of saber-toothed cat. Brown referred to these specimens as "Sabre-tooth Tiger" as was common at that time even though the generally accepted term is now saber-toothed cat in recognition of the fact that tigers are not phylogenetically related to saber-toothed cats. Brown believed he had discovered two distinct genera of saber-toothed cats which he named Smilodontopsis troglodytes and Smilodontopsis conardi. It was not generally settled until 1984 that the Conard Fissure saber-tooths were not actually independent genera but rather standard examples of the genus Smilodon, now considered the standard genus of North American saber-toothed cat.

Notably absent from the specimens was any species of mastodon which stands to reason given that the structure of the fissure was such that creatures possibly entered through a sinkhole in the roof that was too small for mammals of that size.
